= MIT Radiation Laboratory =

World War II radar research organization at the Massachusetts Institute of Technology

Coordinates: 42.3608°N 71.0917°W

Radiation Laboratory
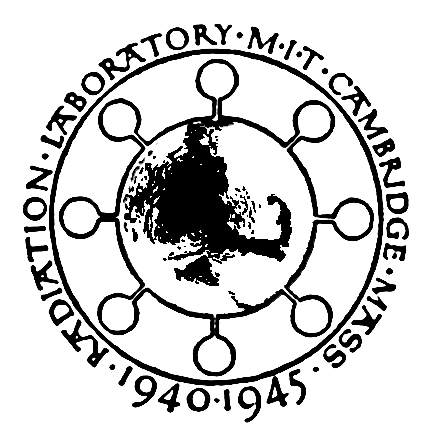
- Emblem from the Rad Lab Series (1946)

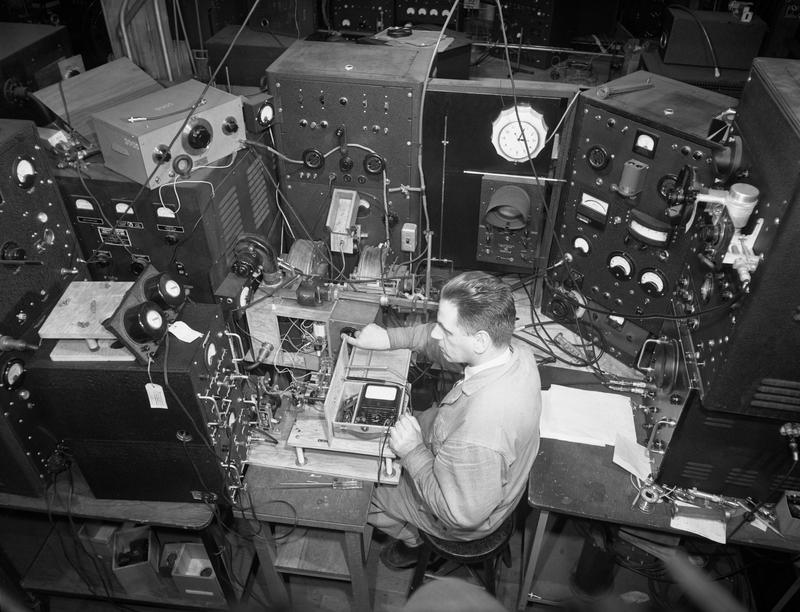
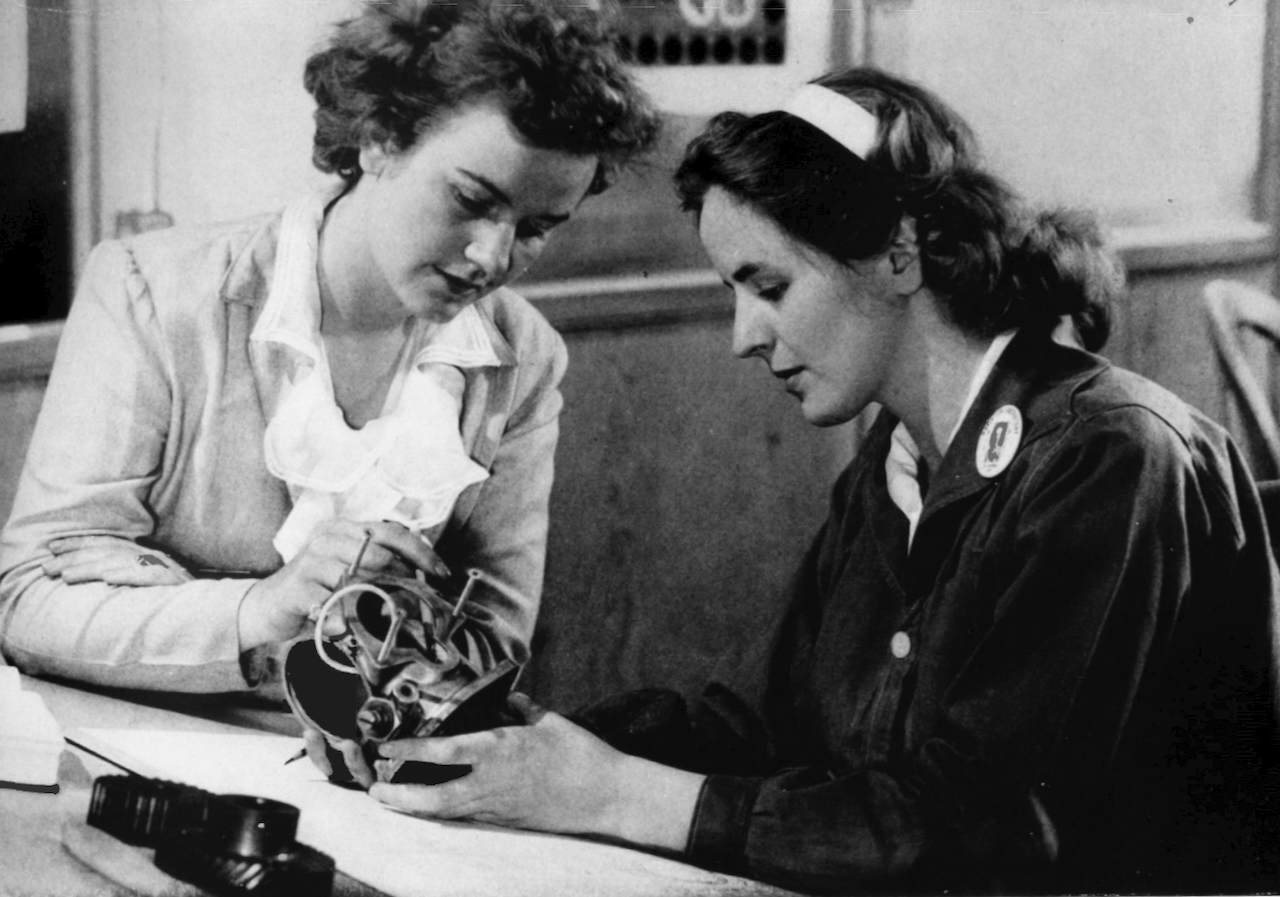
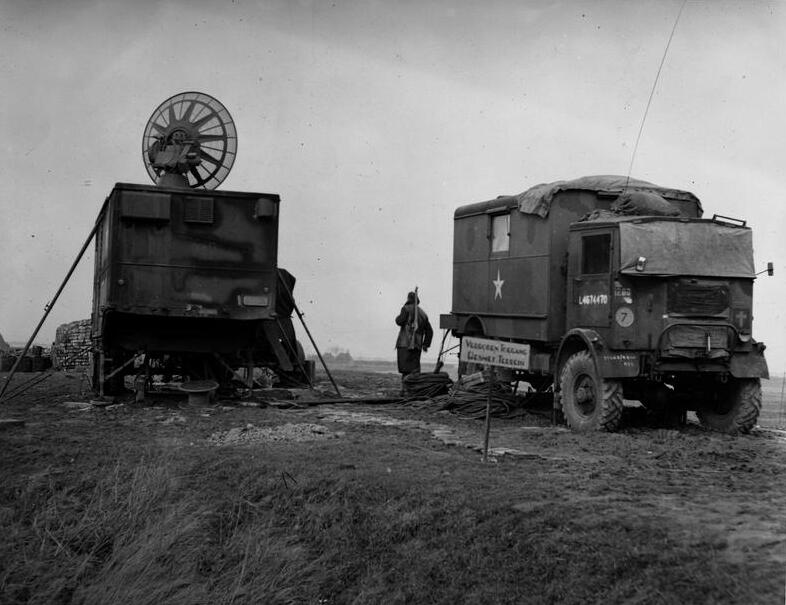
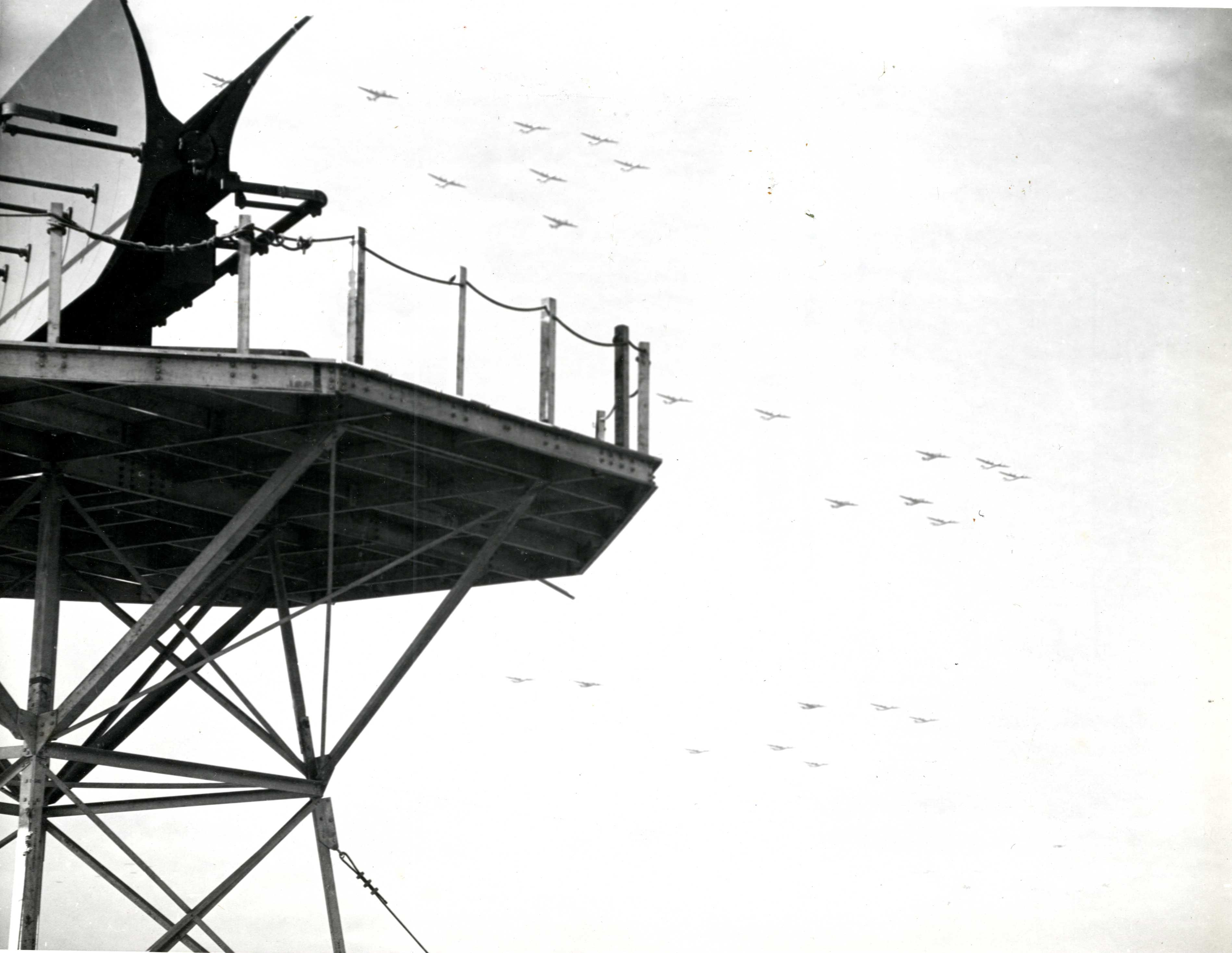
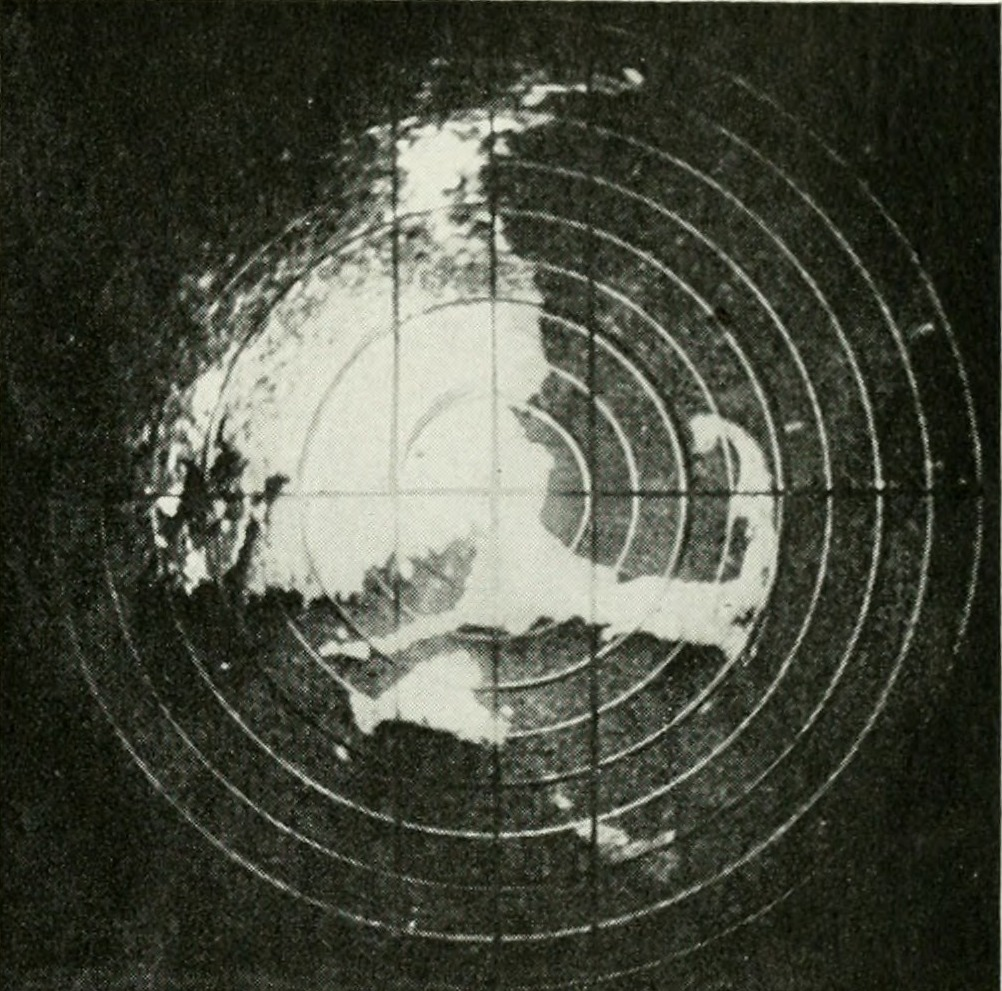
- Nickname: Rad Lab
- Established: October 24, 1940
- Research type: Classified research on radar
- Budget: US$106.8M in total contract value ($1.51 billion in 2025)
- Field of research: Microwave radar; Radar systems
- Directors: Lee DuBridge (Director); F. Wheeler Loomis (Associate); Isidor Rabi (Associate)
- Staff: 3,897 (Aug. 1945)
- Alumni: 6,215
- Location: Cambridge, Massachusetts, United States
- Disbanded: December 31, 1945
- Affiliations: MIT; National Defense Research Committee
- Nobel laureates: 10

The Radiation Laboratory (commonly called the Rad Lab) was a radar research program operating at the Massachusetts Institute of Technology (MIT) during World War II. From 1940 to 1945, the Rad Lab applied new microwave technologies to develop compact radar sets for military navigation and combat. It grew from thirty staff to nearly 4,000 at its peak, with scientific staffing comparable to the Manhattan Project's Los Alamos facility. As the largest contractor of the United States' Office of Scientific Research and Development (OSRD), the lab became a prototype for federally funded university research.

The lab was established in October 1940 after an exchange of Allied military secrets revealed the cavity magnetron, a new microwave power source, to the United States. Equipment designed by the Rad Lab accounted for nearly half of American wartime spending on radar, or approximately $1.35 billion (equivalent to $19.0 billion in 2025). These systems included the SCR-584 gun-laying radar that intercepted V-1 flying bombs over Britain; the airborne H_{2}X radar that enabled American strategic bombing through clouds; and LORAN, a long-range radio navigation system used globally by air and maritime vessels after the war. Expanding beyond its original program of basic research, the Rad Lab engaged in systems engineering, "crash" manufacturing of experimental equipment, and field support in combat theaters. Most lab-designed systems were built by industrial contractors.

Lee DuBridge directed the laboratory, with Isidor Rabi overseeing research operations. It drew physicists and other researchers from sixty-nine universities and received $106.8 million (equivalent to $1.51 billion in 2025) in government contracts, dwarfing MIT's own academic budget and comprising 23 percent of all OSRD research spending. A civilian operation, the lab used facilities of MIT and both military branches, and maintained close ties with its British military counterpart, the Telecommunications Research Establishment.

When it closed in December 1945, its functions were dispersed to industry and to new units within MIT. Two interdepartmental MIT laboratories continued the basic science program of the Rad Lab, and in 1951, the Lincoln Laboratory was formed to further develop radar-based air defense systems. The 28-volume MIT Radiation Laboratory Series compiled and declassified the lab's discoveries, becoming a standard reference in postwar electronics development. Ten laboratory members later won Nobel Prizes, its alumni and inventions helped establish Boston's Route 128 high-technology corridor, and the model of civilian-military research collaboration had a lasting influence on postwar American science.

== Origins ==
=== Pre-war radar development ===
During the 1930s, Britain, Germany, the United States, and other nations independently developed radio detection systems. Each country treated the work as a national secret that could be decisive in war, unaware that rivals had reached similar capabilities. Germany built the earliest sophisticated systems: the Freya early warning radar, Seetakt shipborne sets, and the Würzburg gun-laying radar. Radar historian Louis Brown judged German systems "generally about a year ahead of the Americans." Britain built the first operational network, with Chain Home stations along its east coast providing aircraft detection at ranges greater than 100 miles (160 km) by 1939. More importantly, Britain developed an integrated system for directing fighter interceptors that had no comparison elsewhere. When British and American officials exchanged secrets in September 1940, they discovered their long-wave systems to be virtually identical: Chain Home Low and the US Navy's CXAM operated on the same frequency and shared key technical features.

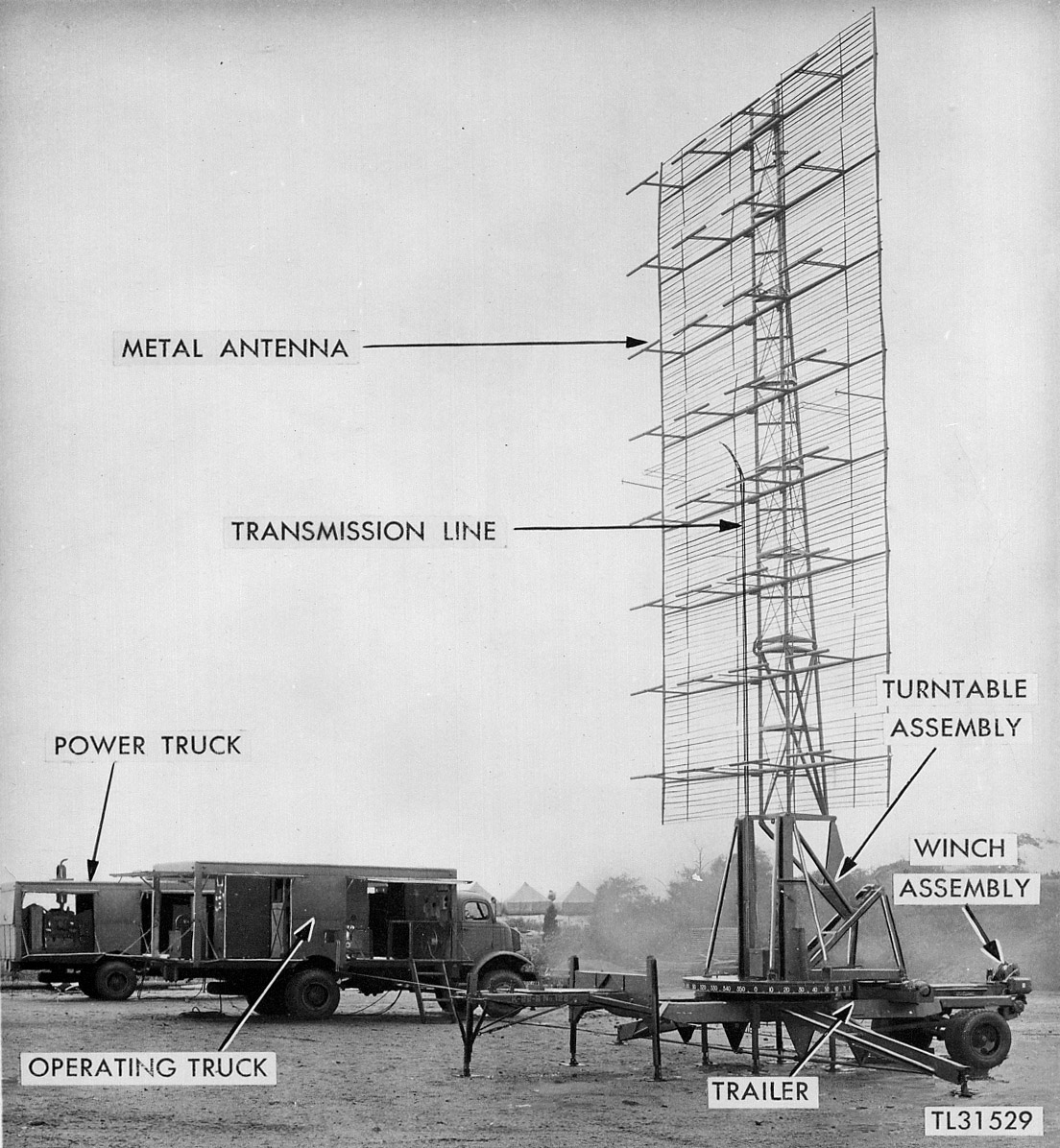
Lacking microwave sources, radars like the US SCR-270 were large and limited in range

American radar development, split between its two services, pursued distinct priorities. The Naval Research Laboratory experimented with relatively long wavelengths. It achieved the first American pulse radar detection of aircraft in December 1934 an installed production sets on capital ships by 1940. The Army Signal Corps, serving the combined Ground Forces and Air Forces before their 1947 split into separate branches, took a different path under Major William Blair. Blair was convinced that the precision required for anti-aircraft fire required narrow beams that only microwave wavelengths could provide. He directed his laboratory at Fort Monmouth to concentrate on this approach. Available microwave generators like the Barkhausen–Kurz tube and split-anode magnetron allowed Signal Corps researchers to detect ships at 3,000 feet (910 m) and vehicles at 250 feet (76 m), results far inferior to what the Navy obtained on longer wavelengths. By 1936, the effort had reached a dead end; Army researchers reluctantly adopted the Navy's pulse techniques.

The advantages of microwaves were well understood inside the British, German, and American programs: compact antennas could fit in aircraft; narrow beams created precise tracking and clearer displays; shorter-wavelengths rader caught low-flying planes slipped beneath long wavelenghts. But no program had a method to generate adequate power at centimeter wavelengths. The best American generator, the klystron, generated roughly one watt at ten centimeters, a level insufficient for practical radar.

=== American mobilization of civilian science ===
The outbreak of war in Europe in September 1939 prompted discussions among leading American scientists about organizing civilian researchers for national defense. Vannevar Bush, president of the Carnegie Institution, James Conant of Harvard, Karl Compton of the Massachusetts Institute of Technology (MIT), and Frank B. Jewett of the National Academy of Sciences met repeatedly during the winter of 1939–40 to consider how to bring American scientific and engineering talent to bear on military problems. In spring 1940, Britain sent physicist Archibald Hill to explore scientific cooperation with the United States and Canada, but Hill found his hands tied without authorization to disclose British secrets. He returned to London to press for formal exchange.

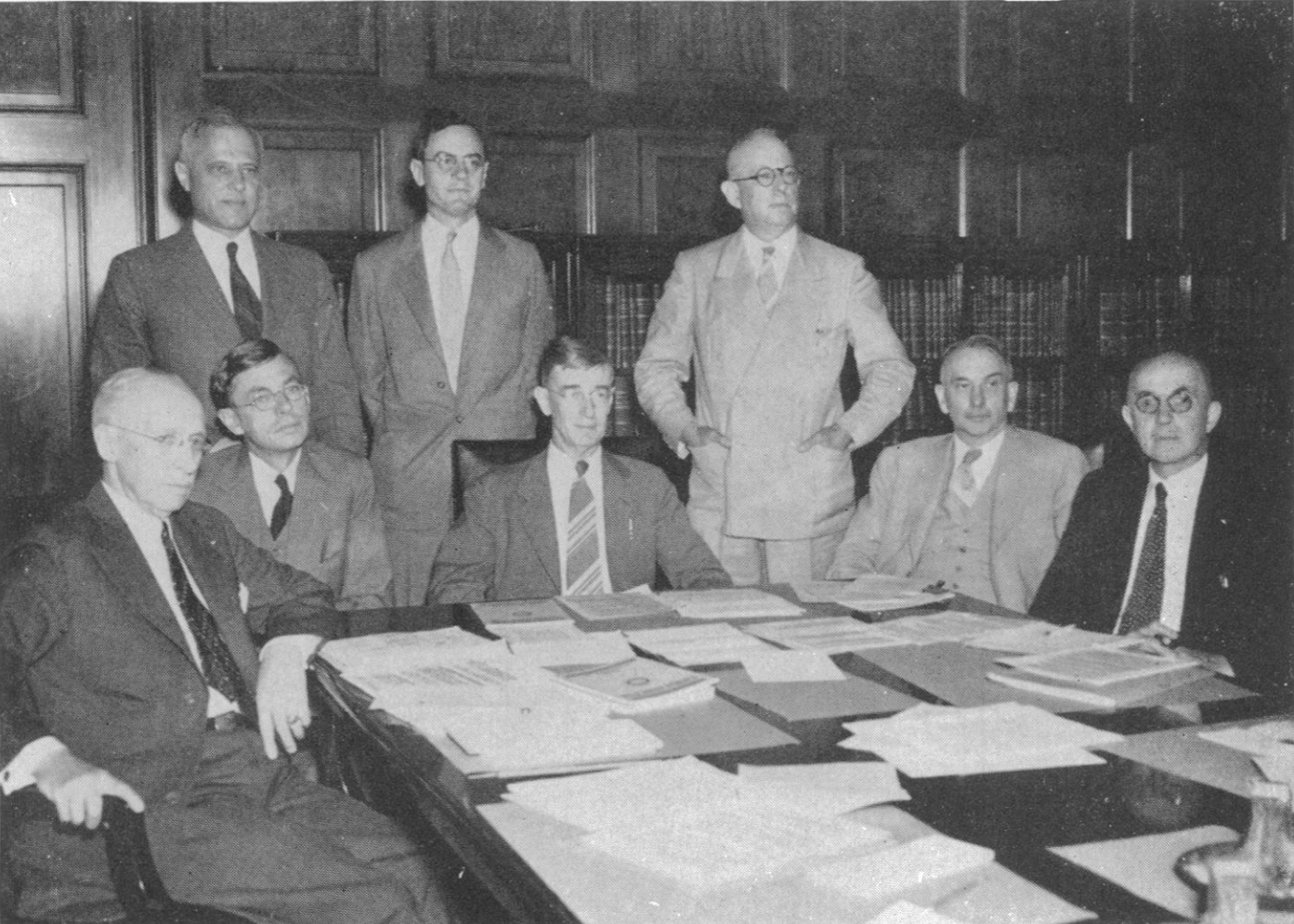
First NDRC meeting among leaders of the US Army, Navy, MIT, Caltech, and Harvard (June 1940)

The rapid German offensives in Norway and the Low Countries, followed by the fall of France in June, transformed these preliminary discussions into urgent action. As Henry Guerlac observed, the collapse "shook Washington with only slightly less violence than London." Bush secured a fifteen-minute meeting with President Roosevelt on 12 June 1940, presenting a single-page proposal for a new agency to coordinate civilian research on military devices. Roosevelt approved immediately, and the National Defense Research Committee (NDRC) was established by executive order on 27 June. Some senior military leaders welcomed the initiative: Army Chief of Staff General George C. Marshall told Bush that approaching war would force military laboratories to concentrate on procurement, leaving critical research gaps that NDRC could fill. The committee organized into five divisions, with Division D covering detection, controls, and instruments under Compton's direction.

Compton established a microwave section in mid-1940, headed by Alfred Loomis, a lawyer-turned-physicist who operated a private laboratory at Tuxedo Park where microwave experiments were already underway. The section, known as the Microwave Committee, included industry representatives from Bell Labs, General Electric, RCA, Westinghouse, and Sperry, as well as Ernest Lawrence from Berkeley. During summer 1940, committee members surveyed American radar efforts and concluded that microwave techniques offered significant potential, though they encountered the same fundamental obstacle British researchers had faced: the lack of a suitable high-power source.

=== The Tizard Mission ===
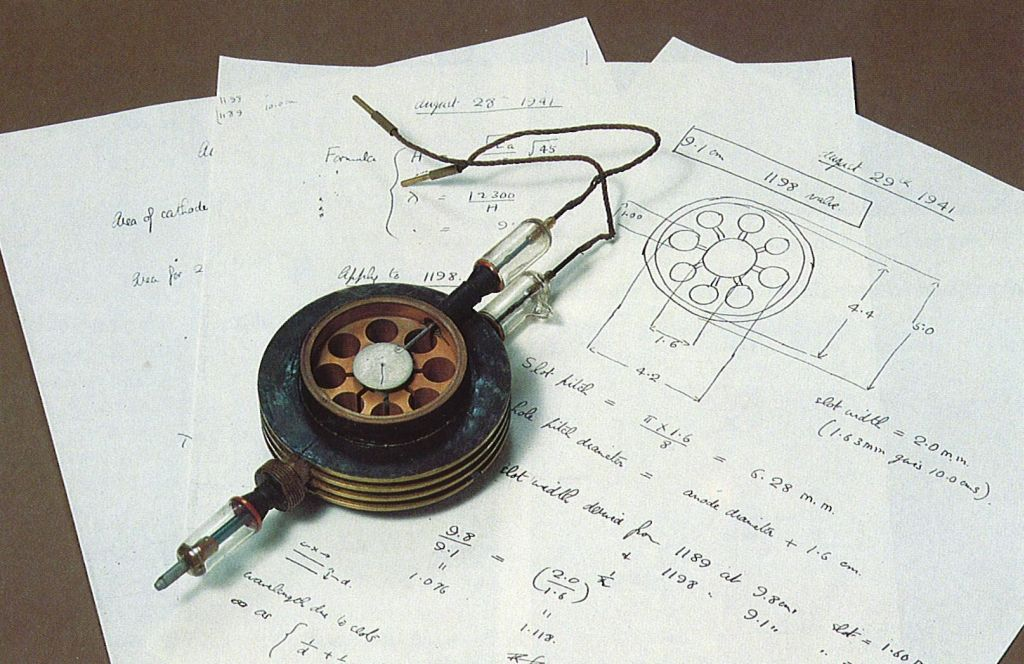
1940 Birmingham cavity magnetron

Unbeknown to the Americans, a research breakthrough had come in February 1940, when British physicists John Randall and Harry Boot at the University of Birmingham invented the resonant cavity magnetron. The new transmitter generated kilowatts of power at microwave (10-cm) wavelengths, representing a thousandfold improvement over competing technologies like the klystron. By August 1940, British researchers had demonstrated the magnetron tracking aircraft in flight.

The fall of France in June 1940 made scientific interchange urgent. Before July was out, President Roosevelt approved an exchange of military secrets based on a diplomatic proposal from British Ambassador Lord Lothian. A British scientific mission headed by Henry Tizard, a university rector and scientific adviser to the Ministry of Aircraft Production, reached Washington in late August and early September 1940. The mission members brought a box containing blueprints and technical data, with authorization to disclose any secret information the British government possessed in exchange for American secrets. Among their cargo was one of the Birmingham cavity magnetrons, which one official history later called "the most valuable cargo ever brought to our shores."

The mission arrived before the Army and Navy had authorized NDRC to disclose information to their British counterparts. The Army granted permission on 12 September and the Navy four days later, each branch expecting "little to learn" from British radar research. On 19 September, Edward "Taffy" Bowen, a radar scientist from Britain's Telecommunications Research Establishment, demonstrated the magnetron to members of the Microwave Committee. Subsequent tests at Bell Telephone Laboratories confirmed the device generated approximately 15 kilowatts at 10-centimeter wavelength, beating output from Bell Lab's best 40-centimeter tube by a factor of seven. On 28–29 September, members of the British mission joined the Microwave Committee as guests of Loomis at Tuxedo Park, where they established priorities for microwave radar development: airborne interception radar for night fighters was designated the most urgent task.

=== Laboratory establishment ===
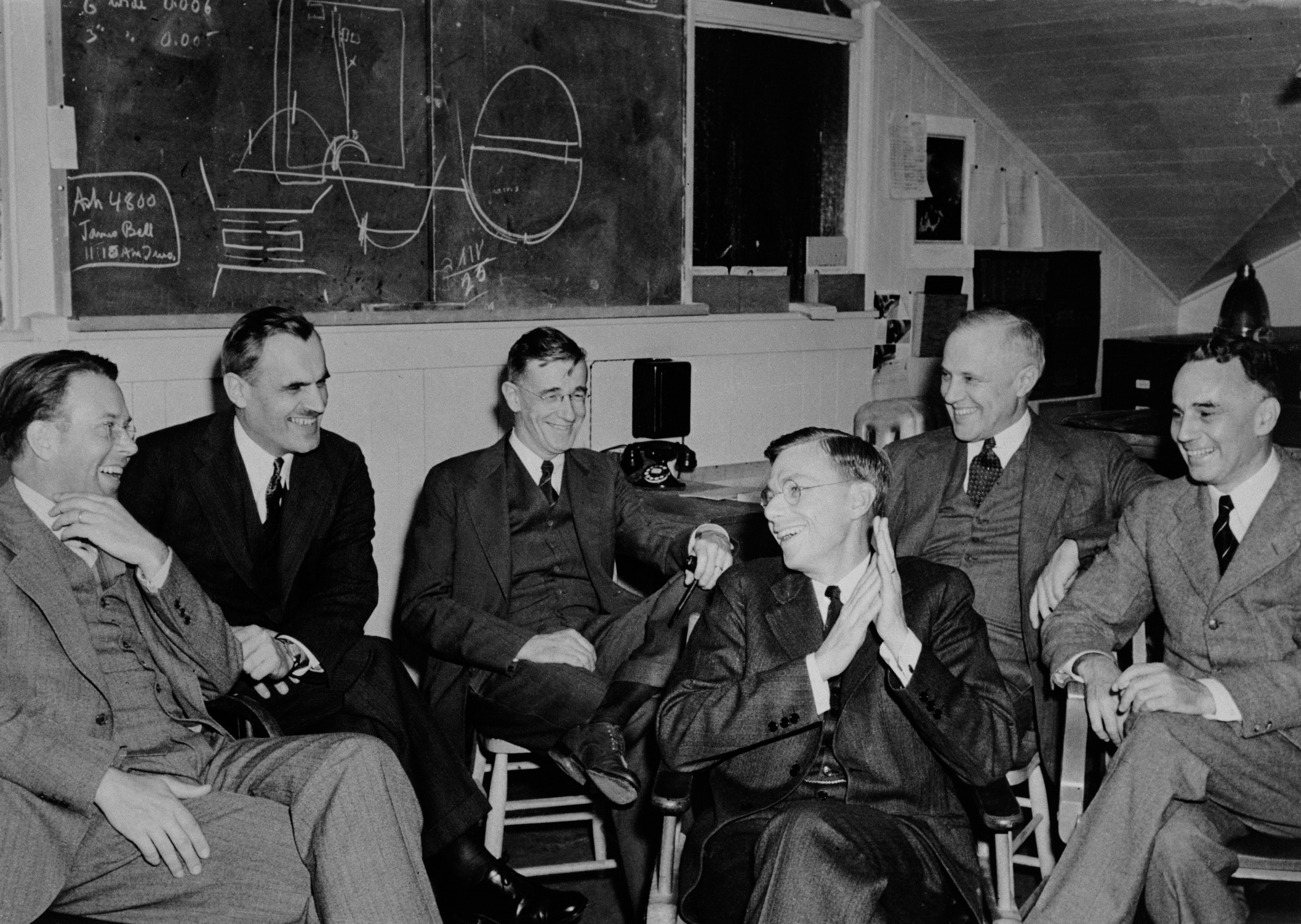
Seen here at the Berkeley "Rad Lab," Lawrence, Bush, Karl Compton, and Loomis borrowed its name to conceal the classified radar project.

The committee concluded that exploiting the magnetron required a dedicated central laboratory staffed by research physicists. During an initial effort to locate the facility at Bolling Field in Washington, D.C., it became clear the NDRC lacked authority to operate laboratories directly, but could contract with existing institutions. Independent surveys by Bush and the Microwave Committee both identified MIT as the institution best positioned to provide the necessary space, scientific staff, and capacity for rapid expansion. (Note: Frank Jewett of Bell Labs proposed locating the laboratory at Bell's Manhattan facilities, citing his organization's experience managing similar research during World War I. However, Bush, Loomis, and Edward Bowles pressed for an academic location.) On 17 October 1940, they secured Compton's agreement to host the laboratory at MIT, though Compton had reservations and recused himself from the formal decision.

NDRC's Steering Committee approved the contract on 25 October 1940, with initial funding of $455,000 ($8.17 million in 2025). (Note: Though work at MIT began immediately, the contract was not formalized until February 1941.) The laboratory was named "Radiation Laboratory," a title selected to suggest similarity to Ernest Lawrence's nuclear physics facility at Berkeley rather than reveal its radar mission. Recruitment began immediately, drawing primarily on physicists familiar with high-frequency techniques from particle accelerator projects. Lawrence declined the directorship but used his extensive network to recruit researchers, including Kenneth Bainbridge from Harvard and Lee DuBridge from the University of Rochester, whom NDRC appointed as director.

In late October 1940, approximately 600 scientists gathered in Boston for a conference on applied nuclear physics. Loomis and Bowles organized laboratory visits and special seminars on microwave techniques. At a 30 October luncheon at the Algonquin Club, Loomis and Compton briefed about two dozen recruits who signed secrecy agreements before receiving details on the laboratory's mission. Within weeks, the effort had attracted Isidor Rabi from Columbia, who brought students Jerrold Zacharias and Norman Ramsey, as well as Luis Alvarez and Edwin McMillan from Berkeley's Radiation Laboratory. On 11 November 1940, the laboratory held its first group meeting in Room 4-133 on the MIT campus, a secure 10,000-square-foot (930 m^{2}) space just off MIT's main corridor. At the meeting, research problems were parceled out into seven "components" sections: pulse modulators, transmitter tubes, antennas, receivers, theory, cathode-ray tubes, and klystrons, with an eighth section handling system integration. By mid-December, approximately 30 physicists were at work, and a wooden penthouse laboratory had been erected on the roof of Building 6.

== Organization ==
=== Governance ===
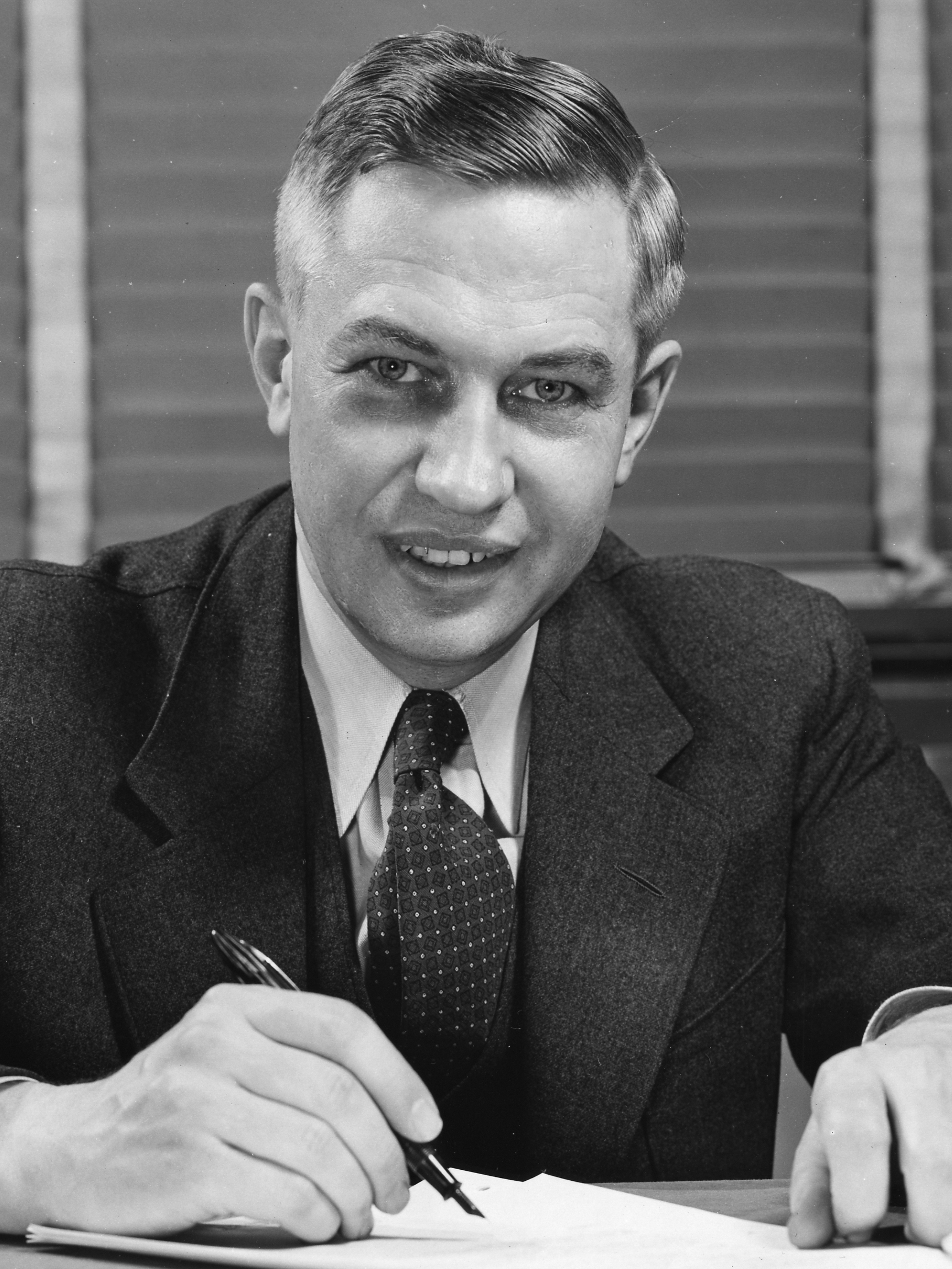
Lee DuBridge, Director

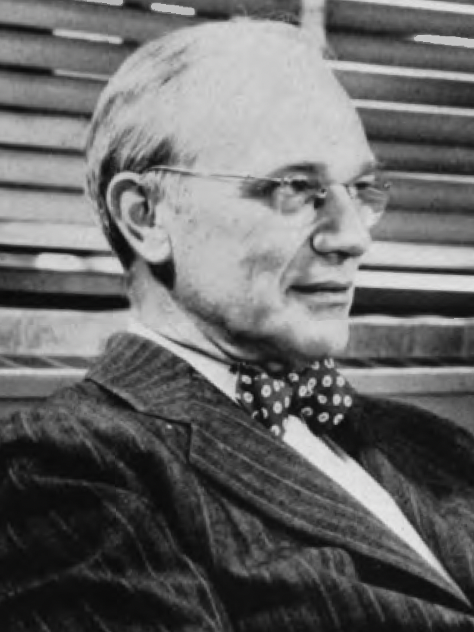
F. Wheeler Loomis, Associate Director

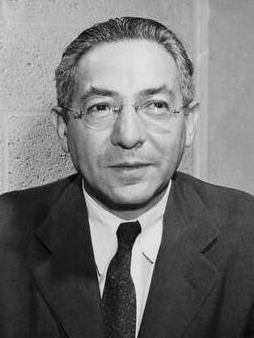
Isidor Rabi, research head

The laboratory operated as a civilian contractor under NDRC's Division 14, which was created in December 1942 when the original Microwave Committee (Section D-1) was elevated to full division status. After the NDRC folded into the new Office of Scientific Research and Development (OSRD) in mid-1941, the lab's wartime research was jointly supported by presidential emergency funds, congressional appropriations, and U.S. Army and Navy contracts. (Note: Ahead of OSRD's formation, federal support lagged the lab's rapid hiring and procurement. Lab expenses were underwritten by MIT through mid-1941. John D. Rockefeller Jr. pledged to anonymously cover up to $500,000 in technical staff salaries to bridge any funding gap through June 1942, a source that was ultimately never needed.) Alfred Loomis presided as section head and chair of the Microwave Committee, whose other seats were filled by large American telecommunications manufacturers.

Lee DuBridge directed the laboratory itself. F. Wheeler Loomis (no relation to Alfred) served as associate director with responsibility for personnel and administrative operations, joining in January 1941. One laboratory member characterized the division of labor succinctly: "DuBridge said 'Yes.' Loomis said 'No.'" Isidor Rabi headed the Research Division and served informally as a "scientific oracle" whom any staffer could approach with technical problems.

DuBridge managed the laboratory collegially, acting as what one historian called "the head of a scientific republic" rather than imposing top-down control. A Steering Committee composed of the directors and division heads met weekly to review general tasks and set priorities, leaving implementation to individual research teams. The Committee membership expanded with the lab's growth to include about twenty people, with only a few from MIT. MIT handled facilities, building, security, and fiscal administration through its Division of Industrial Cooperation, while technical direction remained with the laboratory's scientific leadership.

The laboratory initially organized work around radar components. Early recruits chose their sections informally and "chose up just like a baseball team," as Rabi recalled. This component-based organization evolved in March 1942 into divisions combining both component groups and systems development groups. The systems divisions addressed radar applications: airborne systems, ground and ship systems, special systems, and fire control. The Steering Committee established priorities among competing projects after consultation with military service representatives. However, the laboratory did not confine itself to filling military requests. DuBridge later wrote that "it was not the practice of the Laboratory to wait for official requests for new equipment but rather, by studying the progress of the war, to attempt to visualize such needs in advance," and that strenuous "selling" was often required to convince military agencies of the need for new radar sets.

Radiation Laboratory organization, 1945 (Note: This final divisional structure is from Newton, Petersen & Perkins 1946, pp. 24–25. Leadership of the initial ten divisions is given in Guerlac 1987, pp. 293–295. Changes in division scope and leadership are documented throughout Guerlac's account. More complete personnel inventories are given in DuBridge et al. 1946, pp. 14–15 and Newton, Petersen & Perkins 1946, pp. 78–192)

Director's Office

L. A. DuBridge, Director
F. W. Loomis, Associate Director
I. I. Rabi, Associate Director
J. G. Trump, Assistant Director
H. R. Gaither, Assistant Director

Steering Committee — Division heads and representatives from MIT, the Research Construction Company, and NDRC

Administrative divisions

- Division 1 — Business Office (T. F. O'Donnell)
- Division 2 — Buildings & Maintenance (J. G. Peter) (Note: A "Buildings and Grounds Division" was initially led by the physicist A.J. Allen.)
- Division 3 — Personnel & Shops (F. W. Loomis)

Technical divisions

- Division 4 — Research (I.I. Rabi)
- Division 5 — Transmitter Components (J. R. Zacharias)
- Division 6 — Receiver Components (L. J. Haworth)
- Division 7 — Beacons (L. A. Turner) (Note: Division 7, initially "Special Systems" led by Luis Alvarez, was reorganized as Beacons under Turner after Robert Bacher's departure from Division 6 in mid-1943.)
- Division 8 — Fire Control (I. A. Getting)
- Division 9 — Airborne Systems (M. G. White)
- Division 10 — Ground & Ship Systems (J. C. Street) (Note: Initially known as "Systems Engineering and Production" and led by L. C. Marshall, the Ground & Ships division was successively led by E. C. Pollard, R. G. Herb, and finally J. C. Street.)
- Division 11 — Navigation (J. A. Pierce)
- Division 12 — Field Service (J. G. Trump)

The laboratory's status as a civilian contractor managing classified military research had little precedent in the American military or American universities. Both the Army and Navy established permanent liaison offices at the laboratory, with the Navy office eventually growing to about thirty officers. The laboratory worked directly with military representatives to understand operational requirements, with an average of fifty officers visiting daily by early 1945 for discussions and conferences. Laboratory personnel deployed to bases, proving grounds, and eventually to battlefronts throughout the war to assist with installation, training, and operational refinement of new radar equipment. Edward Bowles, the Microwave Committee's first secretary, was appointed expert consultant on radar problems to Secretary of War Henry Stimson in April 1942, keeping the War Department's leadership informed of radar developments. (Note: John Trump succeeded Bowles as secretary of the Microwave Committee, combining this function with his responsibilities as NDRC representative at the laboratory.) Tizard Mission members Taffy Bowen and Denis Robinson served successively as British liaison representatives at the laboratory, coordinating programs with the Telecommunications Research Establishment.

As the Rad Lab started, a separate laboratory was established to develop electronic countermeasures: technologies to detect and jam enemy radars and communications. With Frederick Terman as director, this group initially occupied space in Radiation Laboratory facilities before moving to Harvard University in July 1942, becoming the Radio Research Laboratory. Though organizationally separate from the Rad Lab under its own OSRD division (Division 15), the two laboratories maintained close working ties throughout the war.

=== Personnel ===
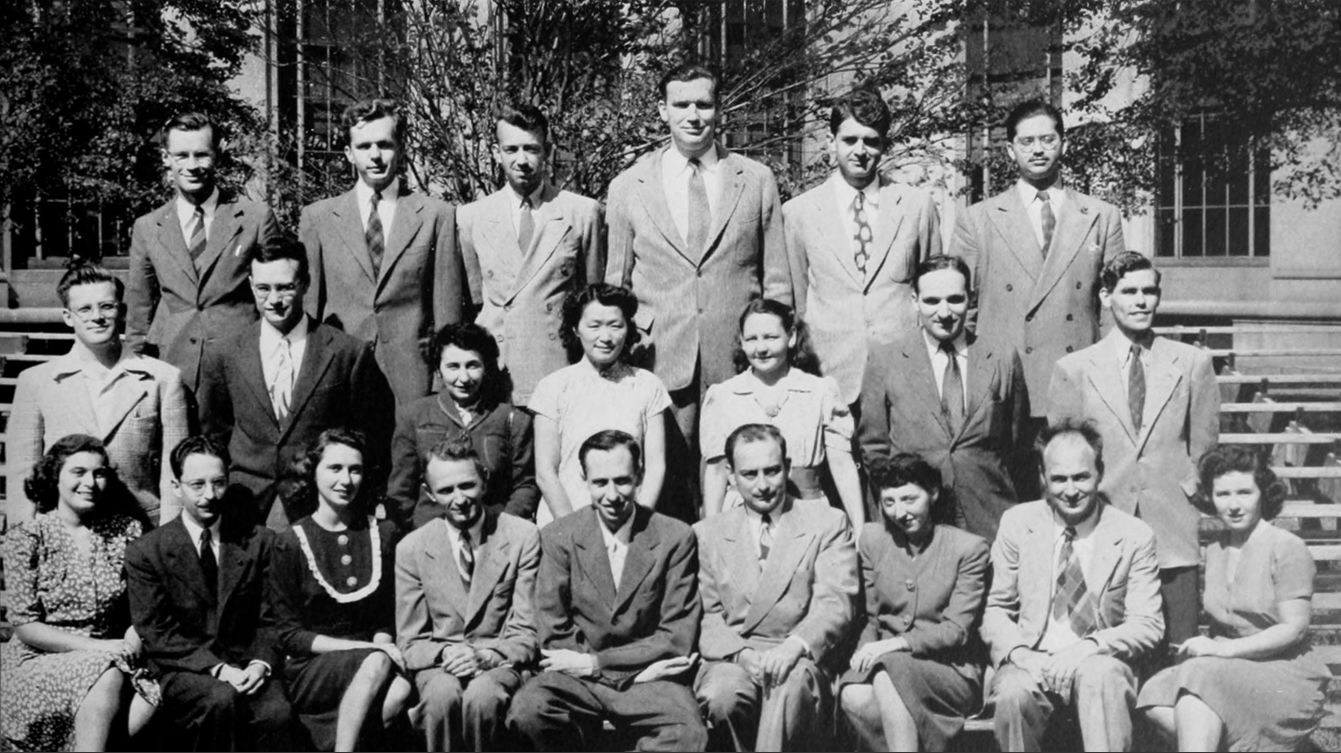
Theory group, led by George Uhlenbeck (at center, front row)

The laboratory grew from approximately 20 scientists in November 1940 to a peak of 3,897 employees in August 1945, comprising 1,189 staff members (scientists and engineers), 1,301 non-staff men, and 1,407 non-staff women. Over the course of the war, the laboratory employed a cumulative total of 6,215 people. The Rad Lab was the largest laboratory operated under OSRD, and comparable in scientific staffing to Los Alamos laboratory of the Manhattan Project. (Note: The Rad Lab's 1,200 technical staff compared to the 1,400 working at Los Alamos.)

Recruitment drew primarily on university physics departments, exploiting networks established through prewar accelerator research. Ernest Lawrence proved an effective headhunter, using his connections to attract researchers familiar with high-frequency techniques. By 1945, sixty-nine academic institutions were represented on the staff. Although physicists predominated, recruits came from fields including physiology, political science, architecture, music, optics, mathematics, anthropology, and astronomy. Nevertheless, the laboratory remained "a physicist's world, run for, and as completely as possible by, physicists."

Salary administration posed its own challenges: staff members on academic leave received salaries tied to their home institutions, while those recruited from industry commanded higher pay. Discrepancies grew pronounced enough that a 1942 restructuring authorized selective merit pay increases to prevent what administrators feared would be a collapse in morale.

Microwave radar development depended heavily on young scientists whose training in the new techniques older researchers often lacked. This created recurring tensions with Selective Service, which conscripted young men by lottery after 1942. In spring 1944, the Massachusetts State Selective Service Director demanded fifty men from the laboratory, which would have disrupted a substantial portion of its work. MIT President Karl Compton protested directly to Undersecretary of War Robert P. Patterson, writing that morale had reached "an all-time low" and "nine tenths of the worries of my most effective colleagues have been spent on this subject." Intervention by Vannevar Bush and OSRD secured the retention of the selected staff.

As the draft depleted male technicians, draftsmen, and mechanics, the laboratory increasingly recruited and trained women. By war's end, roughly as many women worked in technical positions traditionally held by men as in secretarial and clerical roles. Women comprised 36 percent of the laboratory's workforce by 1945, including some in research staff roles. (Note: No secondary source documents the breadth of women's contributions in the Radiation Laboratory. Margaret Rossiter states that OSRD "grossly underutilized its women scientists" across its projects, frequently relegating qualified scientists to administrative roles, but Rossiter does not survey Rad Lab staffing. Rad Lab women working in research positions included Pauline Morrow Austin (LORAN), Yael Dowker (Antenna), Dorothy Gillette (Experimental Systems), Monica Healea, Henrietta Hill Swope (LORAN), and Wang Ming-chen (Theory).)

=== Government contracts ===
MIT received $106.8 million (equivalent to $1.51 billion in 2025) in OSRD research contracts, making it the largest university contractor and accounting for 23.1% of all OSRD research spending; 94% of MIT's government contracts supported radar research at the Radiation Laboratory. OSRD contracts operated on a cost-reimbursement basis, covering the "full cost of the research done under them, including a proportionate part of the indirect expenses incurred" by the university and not directly billed to the research. The laboratory operated under OSRD's "short form" patent clause, giving the government title to inventions rather than merely licensing them.

OSRD's Division 14 supervised a broader network of radar research beyond the Radiation Laboratory itself, managing 136 contracts with 18 academic or private research institutions and 110 contracts with 39 industrial organizations for fundamental research, component development, systems development, and training equipment. The radar program consumed $156.9 million across 183 contracts, with the Radiation Laboratory representing 64.9% of this total.

=== Industrial collaboration ===
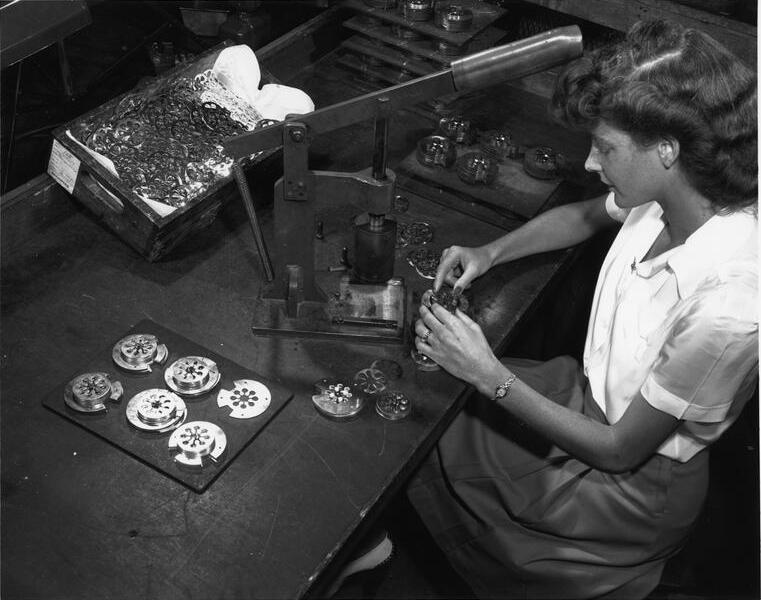
A Raytheon technician punches magnetron disks

Industrial collaboration proved central to the Rad Lab and OSRD operations. From its inception, the laboratory worked closely with Bell Labs, General Electric, RCA, Westinghouse and Sperry Gyroscope, who supplied components, collaborated on systems development, and exchanged technical staff. As the laboratory expanded, it contracted research and development work to other institutions when projects required distinct expertise, placing liaison staff with these contractors.

Rapidly moving from a laboratory prototype to factory product proved more difficult than anticipated. Copying a prototype's physical design did not itself ensure performance, so production equipment often needed extensive re-engineering. The laboratory maintained contact with hundreds of manufacturers, subcontractors, and vendors. A producer of automobile locks became the military's source for waveguide elements; an automobile manufacturer built precision antenna mounts. Each new manufacturer had to be acquainted with new microwave techniques, and often needed the Lab's assistance developing production methods, before military procurement could begin.

The laboratory also conducted limited "crash" production of experimental units through the Research Construction Company, a way to push prototype equipment to the field before full military procurement began. This "red ticket" program addressed a gap neither military research groups nor procurement agencies were equipped to fill: the need for small quantities of new equipment before production lines could deliver months later. Between 1943 and 1945, crash procurements delivered over $30 million (equivalent to $425 million in 2025) worth of equipment to the Army and Navy, representing 22 percent of Division 14's total allocations.

=== Facilities ===
The laboratory began operations in November 1940 in modest quarters: the original laboratory in Room 4-133 and the makeshift "Roof Lab" atop Building 6. Within months, the laboratory had spread across MIT's campus and into nearby buildings. Flight testing commenced at the National Guard Hangar at East Boston Airport in July 1941.

As the lab grew, its facilities sprawled. By early 1942, operations spanned five separate locations: the original two spaces, plus laboratories and shops borrowed from the Mechanical Engineering Department in Building 3, the old Hood Milk Company Building two blocks from the main campus, and Building 24, a permanent fireproof structure erected in autumn 1941. Research scattered across 111,000 square feet (10,300 m^{2}) of lab space created coordination challenges as the laboratory's work intensified.

MIT built aggressively to keep up with personnel growth. Construction began in April 1942 on Building 22, a three-story temporary wooden frame structure that connected to Building 24 by an overpass, while Building 24 itself gained four additional floors and a penthouse. Yet the laboratory continued to outpace available space. President Compton protested the ongoing practice of renting rooms in scattered Cambridge buildings and pushed for a third major structure. Building 20, hastily constructed of mill lumber with transite interior walls, rose in three wings in 1943, ready for occupancy in early 1944. Two additional wings followed as personnel continued to arrive.

Flight operations similarly outgrew their initial quarters. Larger aircraft and the need for longer runways drove relocation from East Boston to Bedford Army Air Base in May 1944, where the laboratory occupied 43,000 square feet (4,000 m^{2}) square feet of hangar space. The Army and Navy each established dedicated flight units to support testing operations: by war's end, the Navy's Special Project Unit Cast operated 35 aircraft with 138 personnel, while the Army's 1st Electronics Experimental Detachment maintained 60 aircraft with 166 personnel.

At its August 1945 peak, the laboratory's 3,897 employees worked across more than 400,000 square feet (37,000 m^{2}) square feet of laboratory and office space, a forty-fold expansion from its original form in November 1940.

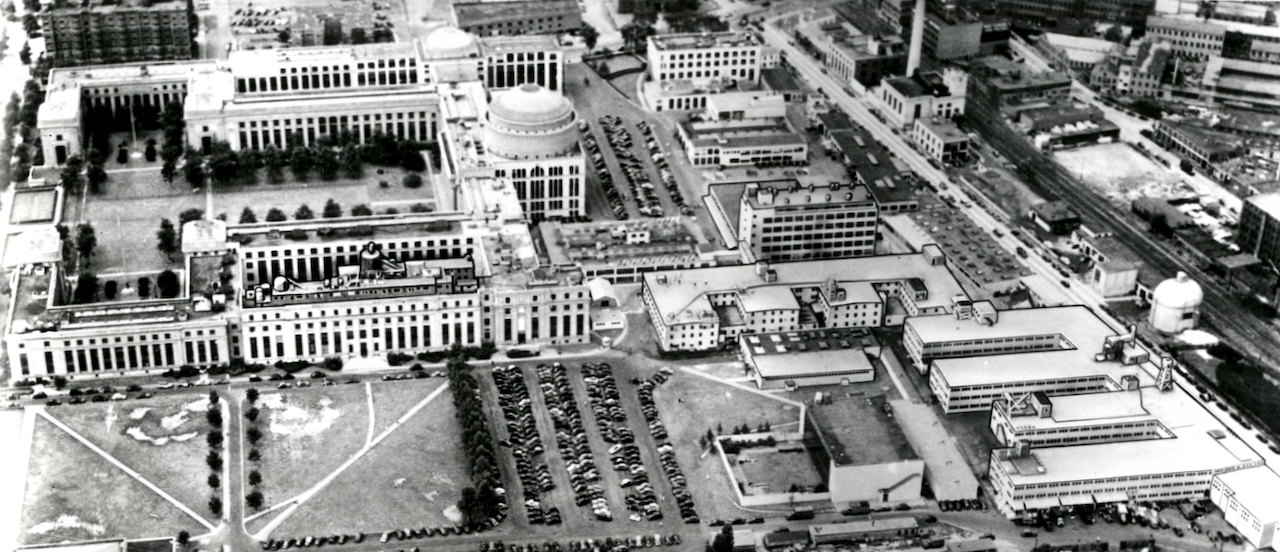
1945 Rad Lab facilities on MIT's main campus, ordered by first occupancy date.

1 / Room 4-133 (11/1940); 2 / Roof Lab, Building 6 (12/1940)	3 / Hood Milk Building (3/1942); 4 / Building 24 (11/1941–7/1942)	5 / Building 22 (5/1942); 6 / Building 20 (12/1943)

=== Field operations ===
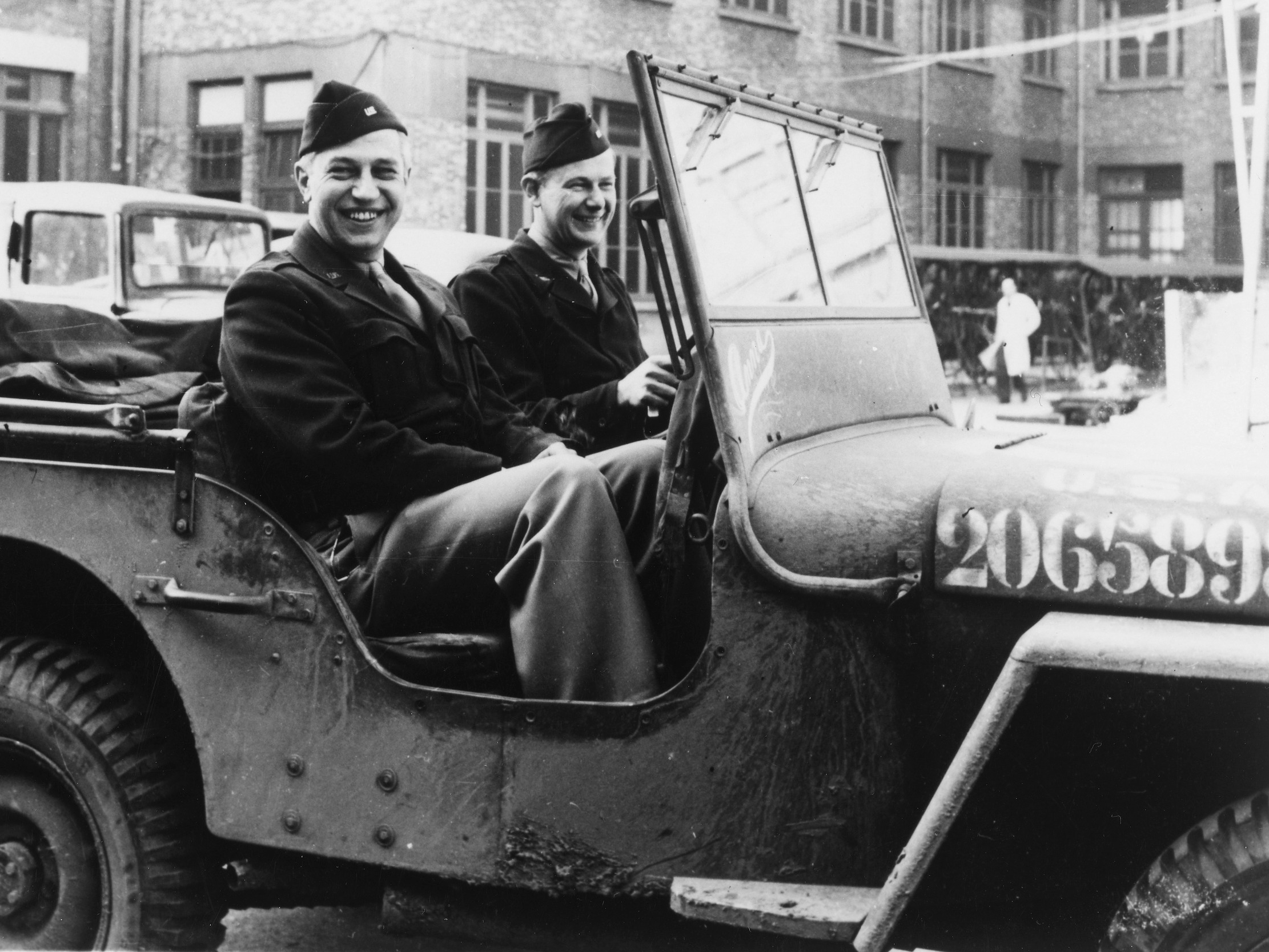
Lee DuBridge and John Trump at the Advanced Service Base in Paris, April 1945

The laboratory's crash production programs required sending personnel to combat theaters. Devices shipped before systematic testing needed scientists who had built them to handle installation and develop techniques for operational use.

In September 1943, the laboratory established the British Branch of the Radiation Laboratory (BBRL) at Great Malvern, England, alongside the British Telecommunications Research Establishment. The official OSRD historian characterized BBRL as "pools of personnel, equipment, shop, and know-how" for modification, debugging, and field assistance rather than a laboratory in the traditional sense. John Trump directed BBRL through most of its existence, reorganizing and expanding the operation in early 1944 to meet growing demands from the Eighth Air Force. The branch eventually numbered approximately 100 personnel, with most deployed to air bases across Britain and the continent. Following the liberation of Paris in summer 1944, BBRL established an Advanced Service Base in the city to aid advancing troops.

Plans for a similar field operation in the Pacific took shape in spring 1945, when OSRD organized a Pacific Branch under Karl Compton's direction. General Douglas MacArthur's headquarters approved the arrangement, but Japan's surrender in August came before the organization became fully operational.

== Early development ==
=== Early radar tests ===
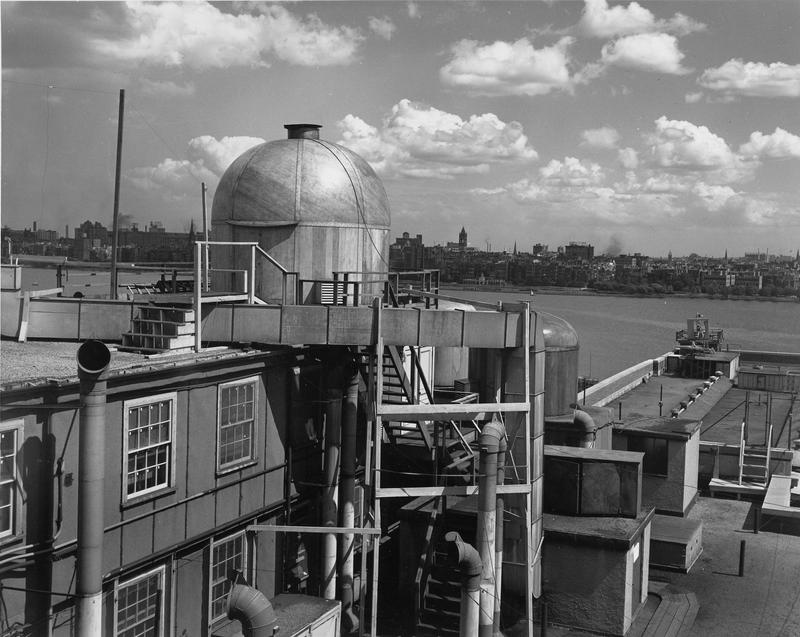
View from the Roof Lab of the Boston skyline, which returned the lab's first radar echoes

The laboratory's original mission comprised three projects, each addressing a critical gap exposed by the Battle of Britain. Airborne interception radar held first priority: the British considered a ten-centimeter set for nightfighters essential to stopping Luftwaffe bombing raids. Second came a long-range navigation system to guide bombers without requiring a signal from the aircraft itself. Third was a microwave gunlaying radar to direct anti-aircraft fire. Staff members christened their Friday evening drinking sessions at the Commander Hotel "Project Four," after these three charter goals.

The laboratory's first months tested whether microwave radar could work at all. Staff members spent November and December 1940 in an intensive effort to meet a self-imposed January deadline: build a working radar system around the British cavity magnetron. No American had built a microwave radar and the short wavelengths required entirely new components. The laboratory's initial staff—physicists, not radar engineers—improvised as they went. On 4 January 1941, two days ahead of schedule, the first test system came to life on the roof of MIT's Building 6. An unwieldy transmitting antenna sat at one end of the rooftop, with the receiving aerial on the other, shielded from its counterpart by a loose screen cage. Within minutes of being switched on, the system registered echoes from the Boston skyline across the Charles River. (Note: Laboratory tradition credited the first echo to the dome of the Christian Science Mother Church.)

The rooftop success proved microwave radar feasible but left the engineering challenges unsolved. The test system used separate transmitting and receiving antennas, an arrangement impossible in aircraft. A practical airborne radar required a single antenna that could both transmit pulses and receive echoes. This demanded a transmit-receive (TR) switch that could shield the delicate crystal detector from the outgoing pulse's energy, then recover within microseconds to let in the faint returning signals. Jim Lawson, one of the few staff members with a strong amateur radio background, attacked the problem. By 10 January, his team had fashioned a workable TR box using a klystron tube as a buffer. A second rooftop test that day demonstrated the first single-antenna microwave radar, prompting DuBridge to telegram Washington: "have succeeded with one eye."

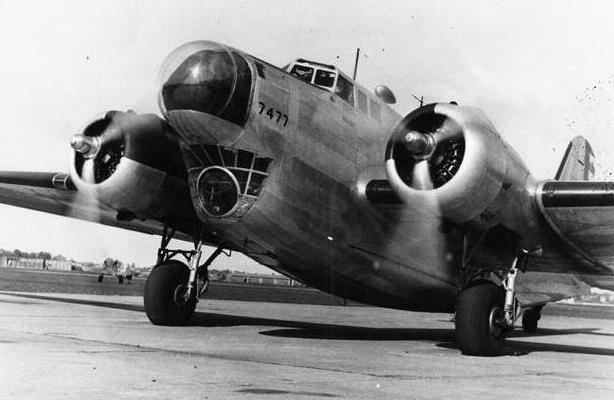
A Douglas B-18, with transparent nose, used for early radar tests

Flight tests followed. On 10 March, the experimental airborne interception equipment flew for the first time in a B-18 bomber equipped with a Plexiglas nose transparent to microwave radiation. Results improved steadily over the following weeks. On 27 March, Edwin McMillan's team flew again with Taffy Bowen and other scientists aboard. The equipment performed admirably, detecting aircraft and ships. When the plane diverted to the submarine base at New London, Connecticut, it picked up surfaced submarines at three miles. The discovery pointed toward a new capability, air-to-surface vessel detection, the lab had not originally prioritized.

=== Gunlaying ===
Work on the second charter project, anti-aircraft gunlaying, proceeded alongside the airborne interception program. In May 1941, officers from the Coast Artillery Board visited the laboratory and expressed strong interest in microwave-guided fire control. Rad Lab scientists proposed system used conical scanning and automatic tracking, techniques that let the radar lock onto a target and follow it without human intervention. A rooftop demonstration on 31 May showed the approach worked. A proposed mobile truck system, designated XT-1, sought to package this system for field use. The following month, DuBridge approved purchase of a truck. Work began under Ivan Getting in an old hangar where the laboratory's Building 20 would later be constructed. By September, a 48-inch (120 cm) paraboloid dish with a spinning dipole had been mounted on an aircraft machine-gun turret from General Electric.

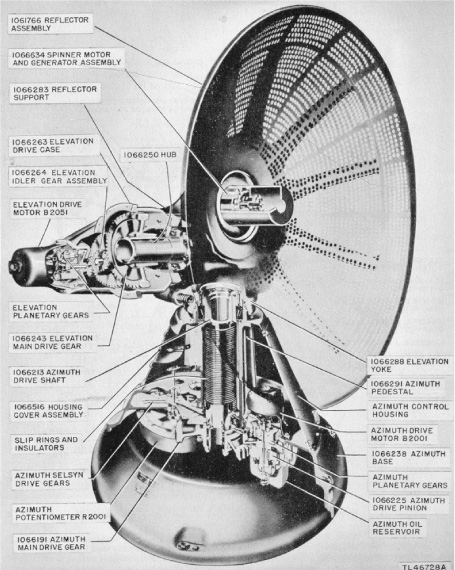
Dish antenna of the SCR-584

XT-1 was not originally intended as a military weapon, but as an experimental platform for further research. Service trials changed that assessment. In late November 1941, the truck went to Fort Hancock, New Jersey for initial tests. After Pearl Harbor disrupted testing, it proceeded to Fort Monroe, Virginia, in February 1942 for formal evaluation by the Coast Artillery Board. The tracking radar was coupled to the T-10 director, an electronic analog computer designed by Bell Labs that predicted the target's location. The combination proved highly effective. Over sixty tracking runs showed probable errors of less than one mil in angle and about twenty yards in range. In firing tests against tugged targets, automatic guns directed by XT-1 and the Bell predictor shot down targets with as few as eight rounds.

The Coast Artillery Board concluded that XT-1 "is superior to any radio direction finding equipment yet tested... for the purpose of furnishing present position data to an anti-aircraft director." On 2 April 1942, the Signal Corps ordered 1,256 copies, designating the production version SCR-584. The order eventually grew to nearly 1,700 sets. (Note: In contrast to the SCR-584 program, ground-based fire control effort, the Rad Lab's parallel program for automatic airborne fire control systems saw no significant combat use. The lab's self-evaluation attributed the slow progress to fragmented responsibility between radar and gunsight developers across separate NDRC divisions, overambitious designs, overburdened military testing agencies, and changing tactical conditions that reduced demand before lightweight systems were ready.)

=== Anti-submarine radar ===
The laboratory's founding projects had emphasized aircraft interception and anti-aircraft fire control, reflecting the Battle of Britain's lessons about the threat of nighttime bombing. By mid-1941, Britain had defeated the Luftwaffe's daylight offensive, and attention turned the Atlantic theater. German U-boats, now operating from French ports, were sinking merchant ships faster than Allied shipyards could replace them. Longwave air-to-surface-vessel radar (ASV) existed, but it performed poorly against submarines: sea clutter cut detection ranges, and broadcasting meter-length radio waves allowed U-boats to detect approaching aircraft and submerge before interceptors arrived.

In July 1941, Denis Robinson arrived from Britain's Telecommunications Research Establishment with instructions to refocus its American partner on anti-submarine radar. DuBridge began phasing out the original aircraft interception project and raising the priority of air-to-surface-vessel research. By fall 1941, the laboratory carried at least five ASV projects on its books, each tailored to a type of aircraft. A prototype installed aboard the naval destroyer USS Semmes showed the system's potential. The experimental radar, incorporating the first plan position indicator, guided the vessel and three submarines into a harbor through heavy fog, detecting buoys that visual lookouts could not see. The Navy placed a production order with Raytheon for what became the SG radar, later called "one of the most widely used and effective of all shipboard radars."

The shift from research to production accelerated after the attack on Pearl Harbor, which prompted the United States to declare war. In early 1942, German U-boats began Operation Paukenschlag, attacking defenseless American shipping on the Atlantic seaboard. In January and February, Army Air Forces planes without radar managed attacks against only four U-boats in 8,000 flying hours. DuBridge made ASV the lab's highest priority. In February 1942, ten B-18 bombers arrived at East Boston Airport to be immediately fit with microwave sets.

=== Entry into war ===
The Japanese attack on Pearl Harbor marked a turning point in the laboratory's history. Until December 1941, DuBridge had half-expected the enterprise to fold sometime in 1942; afterward, he sold his house in Rochester and moved permanently to the Boston area. The attack revealed that microwave radar would not be a short-term research project but a commitment lasting the length of the war.

War exposed a gap between laboratory prototypes and battlefield equipment that the existing organization could not bridge. The problem was fundamental: replicating a prototype's physical design did not guarantee matching its performance. Field-ready equipment often demanded extensive re-engineering. Neither military research groups nor procurement agencies could produce the small quantities of new equipment needed in the months before production lines could deliver. Military research groups considered their work complete once a device was demonstrated; procurement agencies objected to items that were not yet standardized for mass production.

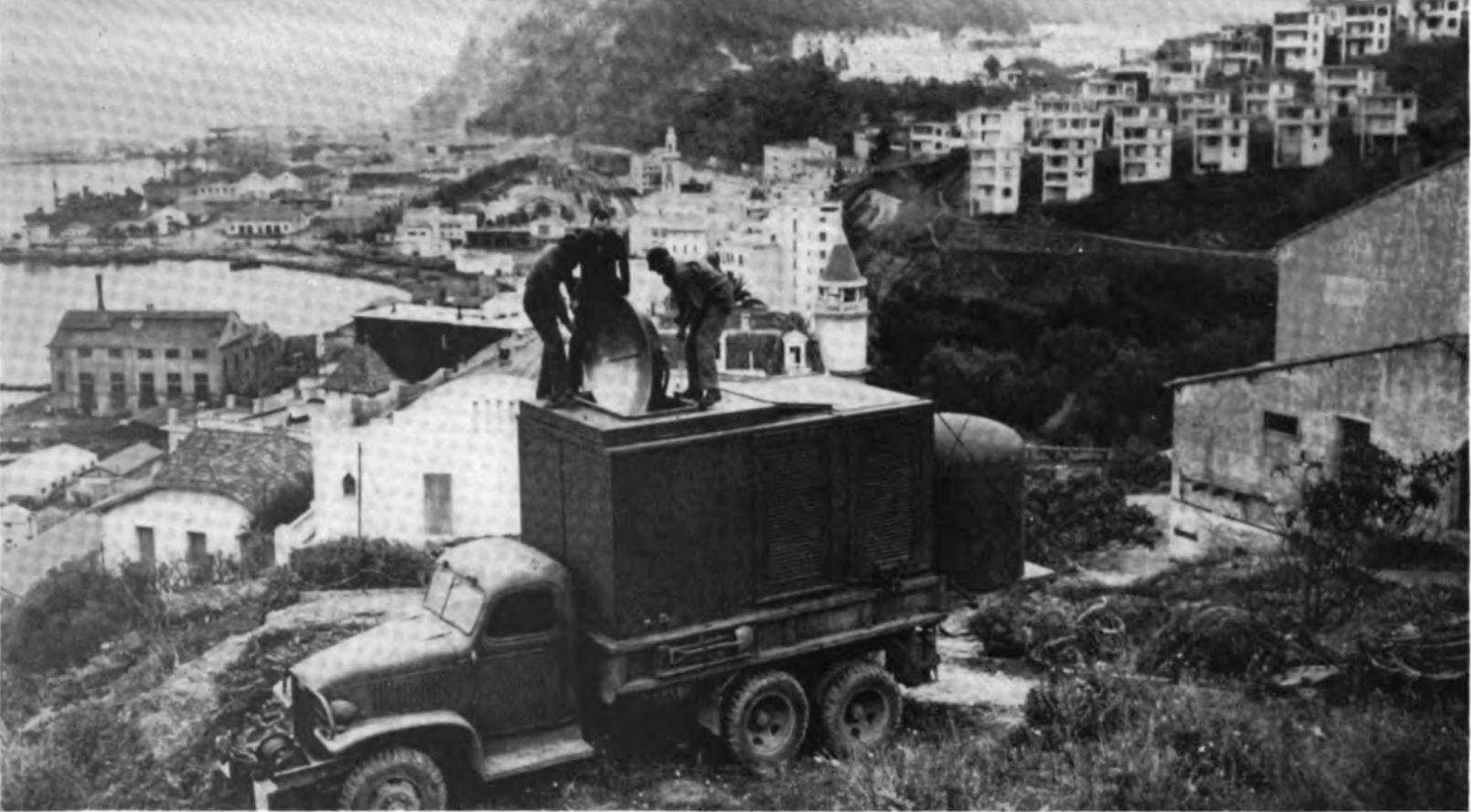
Installing SCR-582 search radar over Algiers harbor

To fill this gap, NDRC had authorized a model shop September 1941, which became the Research Construction Company. (Note: Originally known as the Radar Model Shop, the Research Construction Company was managed under a separate NDRC contract with the nonprofit Research Corporation. It opened in a warehouse adjoining the MIT campus at 230 Albany Street.) Normal model shop work gave way to emergency production almost immediately. On 17 December 1941—ten days after Pearl Harbor—the Signal Corps ordered fifty sets of the SCR-582, a ground-based microwave surveillance radar. Five of these sets became the first microwave ground equipment to see combat, deployed during the North Africa invasion in November 1942. "Crash" orders of this type became the shop's primary function: rapid hand-production of experimental equipment while company factories tooled up for mass manufacturing.

To prepare combat-ready radar systems, the laboratory itself required restructuring. In the week after Pearl Harbor, DuBridge and several colleagues began informal discussions about expansion; over the following three months, the problem was debated among group leaders. Some industrial representatives on the Microwave Committee opposed further growth, arguing that the laboratory was encroaching on industry's legitimate sphere and was not properly constituted for engineering work. Alfred Loomis led the opposing view, believing firmly in the necessity of a "follow through" policy. The committee ultimately recommended "a severalfold increase in the number of scientists and engineers engaged in its research and development program."

Under full war mobilization, the research laboratory faced demands it had not been designed to meet: engineering design, crash production, installation, training, field maintenance, and operational analysis. DuBridge estimated that covering all these functions would require 3,000 people, six times the laboratory's current size. Several reorganization proposals circulated. Taffy Bowen, drawing on TRE's experience, proposed splitting the laboratory into three independent units for ground, shipboard, and airborne systems, respectively—a "vertical" structure in which each division would handle its own components. A counterproposal for a "horizontal" structure came from components researchers, who wanted to preserve the practical feedback that motivated their best work.

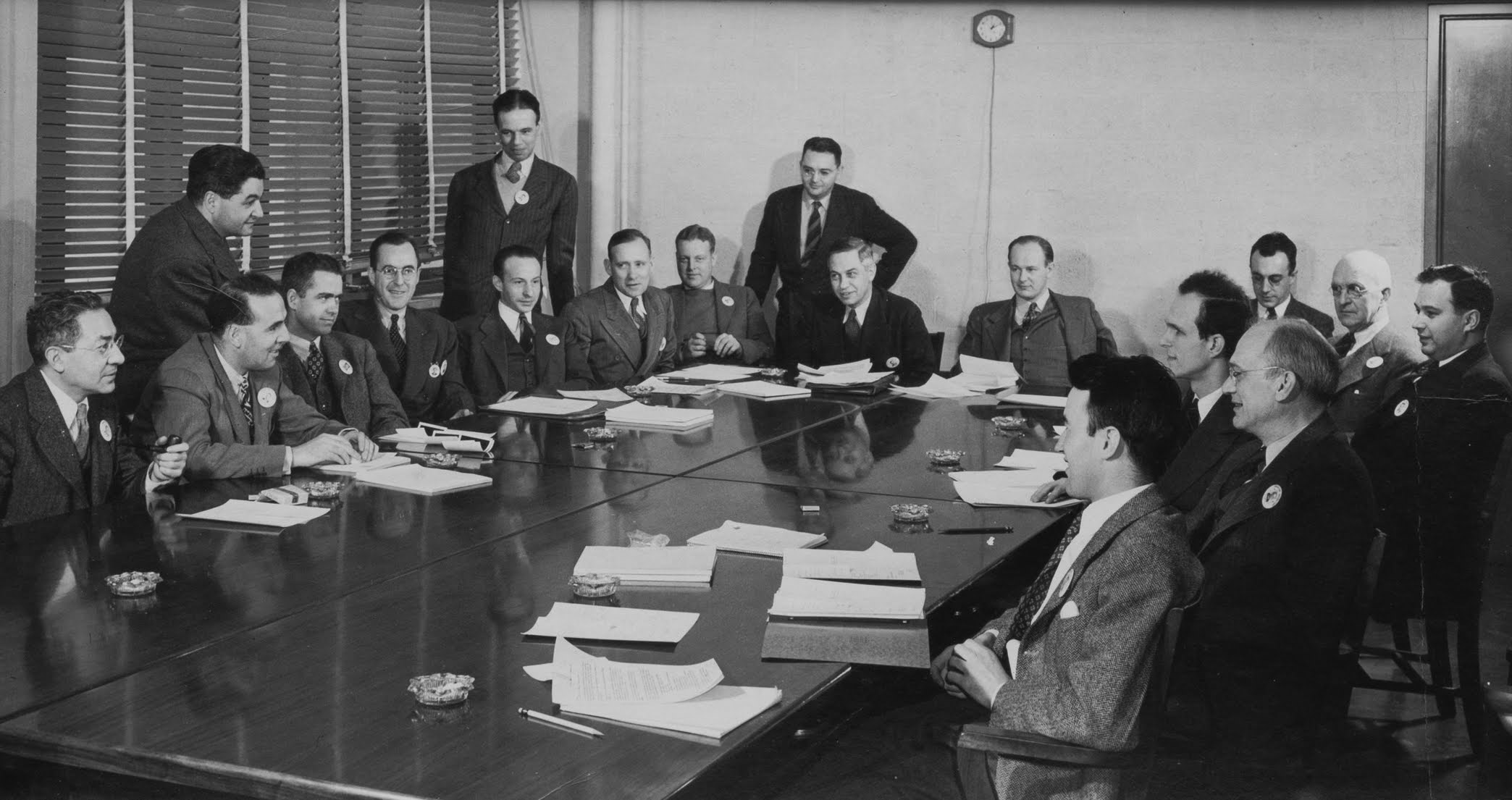
DuBridge leads a Steering Committee meeting, February 1944

DuBridge's compromise, adopted in March 1942, combined both approaches. Components groups came together into divisions, while each systems group working on related applications came under a single divisional head. The organizational structure was determined by leadership available: the director and Steering Committee picked the strongest scientists and built divisions around them. (Note: Ten divisions were established initially, and was later expanded to twelve as the Loran navigation group became Division 11 and field operations were consolidated into Division 12. Division heads changed over time as senior staff departed for other war work. Robert Bacher, who initially led Division 6 (Receiver Components), left for Los Alamos in mid-1943, and Kenneth Bainbridge, the first head of Division 8 (Ground and Ship Systems), followed him there.) The hybrid structure gave divisions considerable autonomy while forcing cooperation between components and systems groups. Guerlac later observed that this interdependence proved "an invaluable source of stimulation and mutual education," even as it created friction between groups with different temperaments and priorities. By the end of 1942, staff had grown from the original thirty to over a thousand.

== Radar navigation and control systems ==
The laboratory developed several systems that, while not weapons themselves, enabled military operations that would otherwise have been impossible. These included a systems aiding long-range navigation, systems for precision landing of aircraft, and a surveillance radar that coordinated air operations over the European and Pacific theaters.

=== Long-range navigation (LORAN) ===
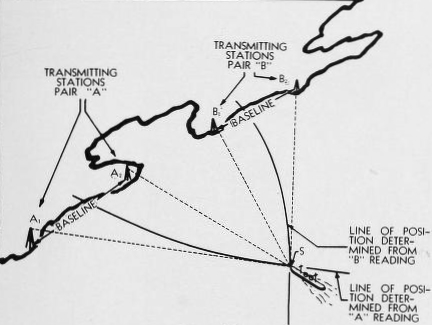
Paired Loran transmitters could fix vessel positions

Long-range navigation was the last of the three charter projects assigned to the Radiation Laboratory. In October 1940, Alfred Loomis proposed a hyperbolic navigation system in which synchronized radio pulses from pairs of ground stations would enable ships and aircraft to fix their position by measuring the difference in arrival times. The scheme was identical in principle to the British Gee system, about which members of the Tizard Mission were only imperfectly informed; Loomis appears to have arrived at the concept independently.

The navigation group, established in January 1941 under Melville Eastham, initially planned to work at 30 MHz to transmit ground waves. During the summer, however, the group discovered that waves reflected from the ionosphere at lower frequencies were stable enough for accurate fixes at ranges exceeding a thousand miles—far beyond what direct ground-wave propagation could achieve. By September 1941, the group had shifted to 2 MHz and developed the precision timing circuits that became the system's foundation. The name emerged from "long-range navigation," first abbreviated LRN and later expanded to Loran.

The first full-scale test came in June 1942, when a Navy blimp carried an experimental receiver over the Atlantic. The results aroused intense service interest. Laboratory engineers, traveling through U-boat-patrolled waters without waiting for escort, supervised installations at stations in Nova Scotia, Newfoundland, Labrador, and Greenland during the fall and winter of 1942. The four southernmost stations began regular service on October 1, 1942, inaugurating the first Loran chain. By July 1943, the system had been turned over to the US Coast Guard and the Royal Canadian Navy.

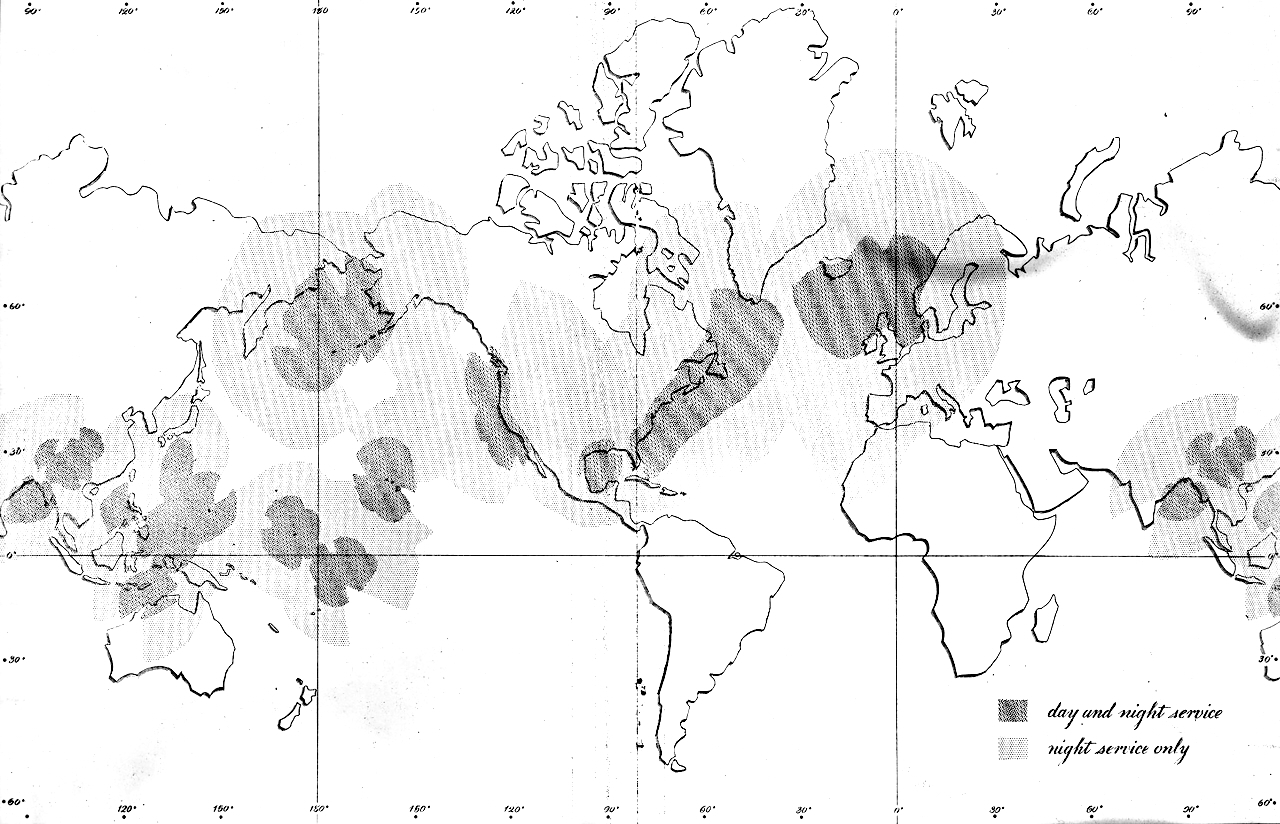
Worldwide Loran navigation coverage, January 1946

Upon discovering that skywave signals could synchronize stations as far as 1,240 miles (2,000 km) apart, the group developed SS (sky-wave synchronized) Loran. Skywaves extended nighttime coverage deep into Central Europe, supporting the RAF Bomber Command night bombing camping beginning in October 1944. The Joint Chiefs of Staff directed the Coast Guard to install Loran stations to cover a large area of the Pacific during 1944 and 1945. By the war's end, 70 Loran stations and 75,000 vessel-based receivers provided navigation for approximately 30 percent of the Earth's surface. The navigation group that accomplished this employed only 73 people.

Loran was one of several long-range radio navigation systems that debuted during the war, among them the British Gee and Decca Navigator and the German Sonne–Consol. Loran alone covered multiple continents, and it remained in service longer than any other wartime radio navigation system. The 2 MHz band system continued as the postwar standard, designated Loran A. A low-frequency successor, Loran C, became operational at 100 kHz in 1957 and served marine and aviation users into the twenty-first century.

=== Blind landing (GCA) ===
Before the war, several agencies had developed instrument landing systems, none of which were satisfactory for military purposes. Existing approaches required special equipment in the aircraft and demanded interpretation by pilots returning fatigued from combat.

In August 1941, Luis Alvarez watched the Roof Lab demonstration of the XT-1 gun-laying radar. A pilot himself, realized that if a radar could track aircraft accurately enough to direct anti-aircraft fire, it should be able to guide pilots to safe landings. He envisioned a system in which ground controllers would "talk" pilots down by comparing the aircraft's radar-measured position against an ideal glide path. Initial tests of this concept with the XT-1 prototype failed: the radar beam sometimes detected the aircraft's reflection off the ground, placing it below the runway without warning.

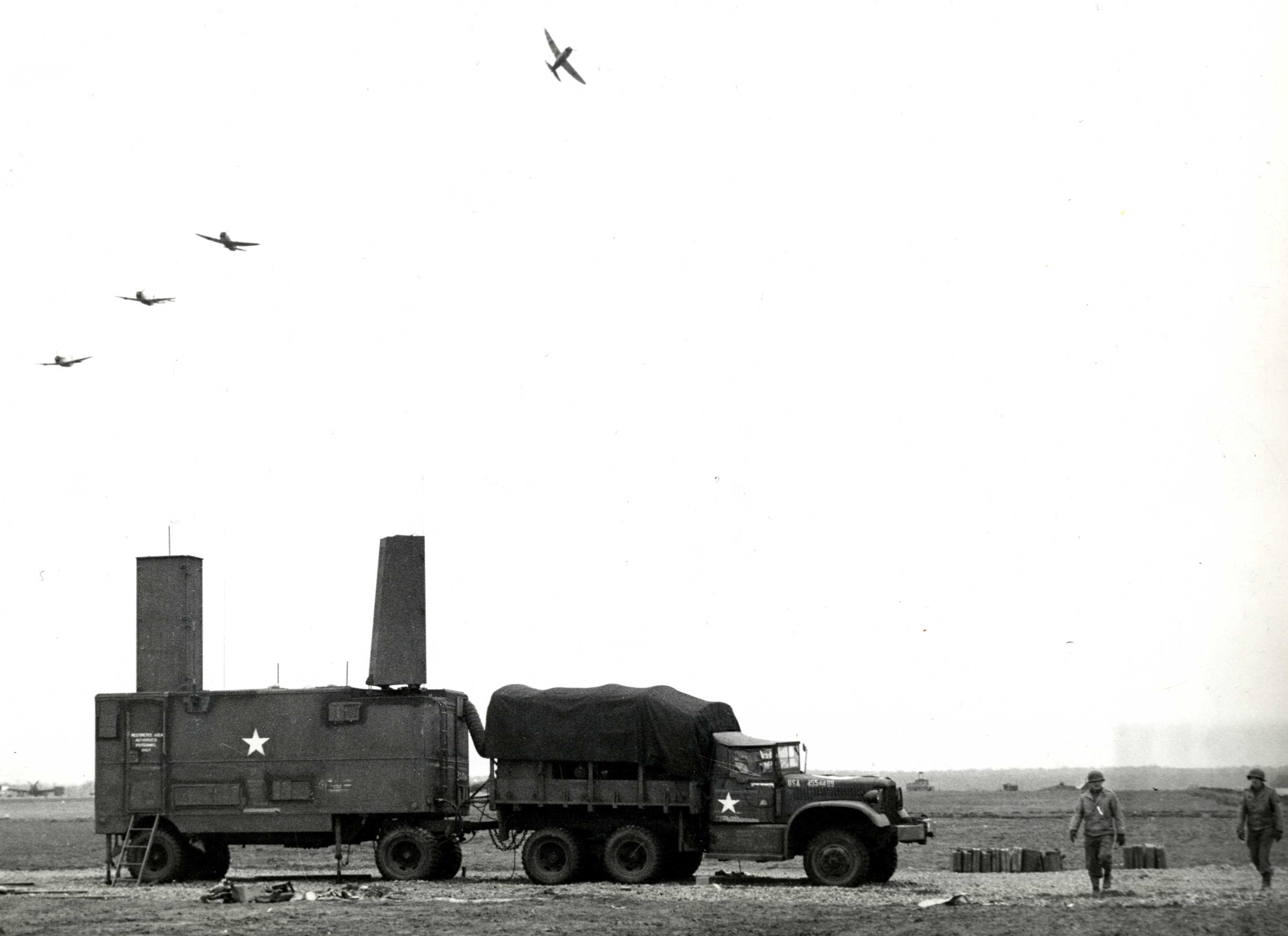
Mobile GCA installed in Verdun, France

Alvarez and Alfred Loomis worked out a solution. The resulting Ground Controlled Approach (GCA) system used three separate radars: a 10-centimeter search set feeding a Plan Position Indicator to manage traffic, and two 3-centimeter sets with narrow fan-shaped beams—one scanning vertically for elevation, the other horizontally for azimuth. The shorter wavelength eliminated ground reflections. Lawrence Johnston served as project engineer, with Gilfillan Brothers manufacturing the sets.

A single Mark I system, tested under field conditions in England in 1943, proved successful, and demands came from all theaters. By the time the Mark III appeared, crews had made more than 2,000 successful blind landings. Sets saved numerous bombers returning damaged from Germany. GCA operated on Iwo Jima, Leyte, Okinawa, and other Pacific bases; the Iwo Jima installation saved several B-29s returning from raids on Japan.

The system's greatest demonstration came after the war. During the Berlin Blockade of 1948–49, continuous flights supplying the city would have been impossible without GCA to handle landings in persistent poor weather. At the century's end, ground-controlled approach remained in use for tower-assisted approaches at airports worldwide.

=== Microwave early warning (MEW) ===
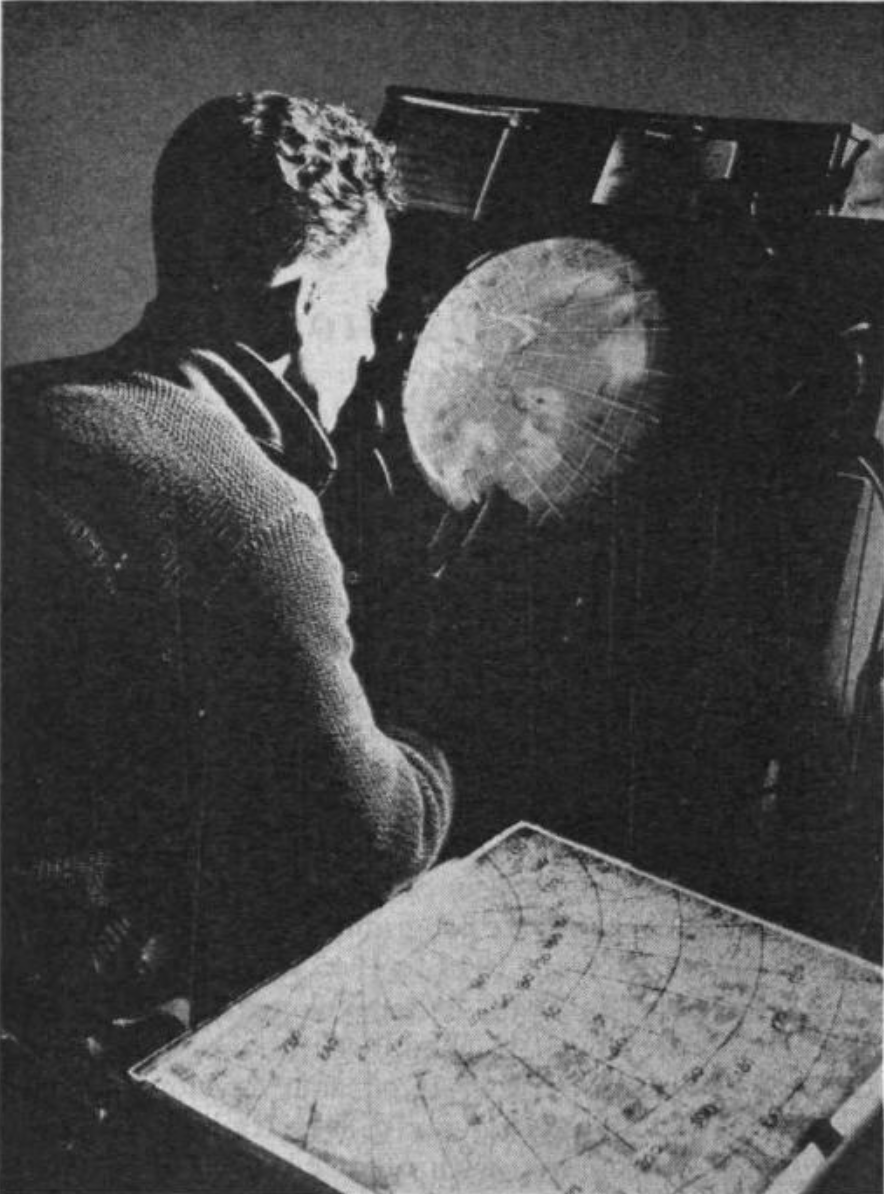
Technician at MEW console with plotting chart

In the months following Pearl Harbor, when a Japanese air attack on the West Coast seemed possible, Alvarez conceived a high-power microwave radar for long-range early warning. Microwave Early Warning sets would combine the detection range of existing meter-wave systems with the resolution and low-altitude coverage that only microwaves could provide.

The central innovation was a new antenna, which could detect aircraft at 300 kilometres (190 mi). A parabolic cylindrical reflector 25 feet (7.6 m) wide, fed by a linear array of 106 dipoles, produced a beam only 0.8 degrees wide. Early arrays radiated strong sidelobes, which allowed aircraft several degrees off the main beam axis to register as though they lay dead ahead. In May 1942 Alvarez halved the spacing by interleaving a second set of dipoles between the existing ones, then reversed the orientation of alternate elements so that all of them radiated in phase, suppressing the spurious lobes. This arrangement that became standard on airport search radars after the war. The complete system weighed 66 tonnes (66,000 kg) and required eight trucks to transport.

General Electric received an order for 100 production sets in the summer of 1943, but delivery was not expected before early 1945. To get MEW into combat sooner, the laboratory agreed to hand-build five sets on a crash basis, and these were the only units available for wartime operations.

==== European theater ====
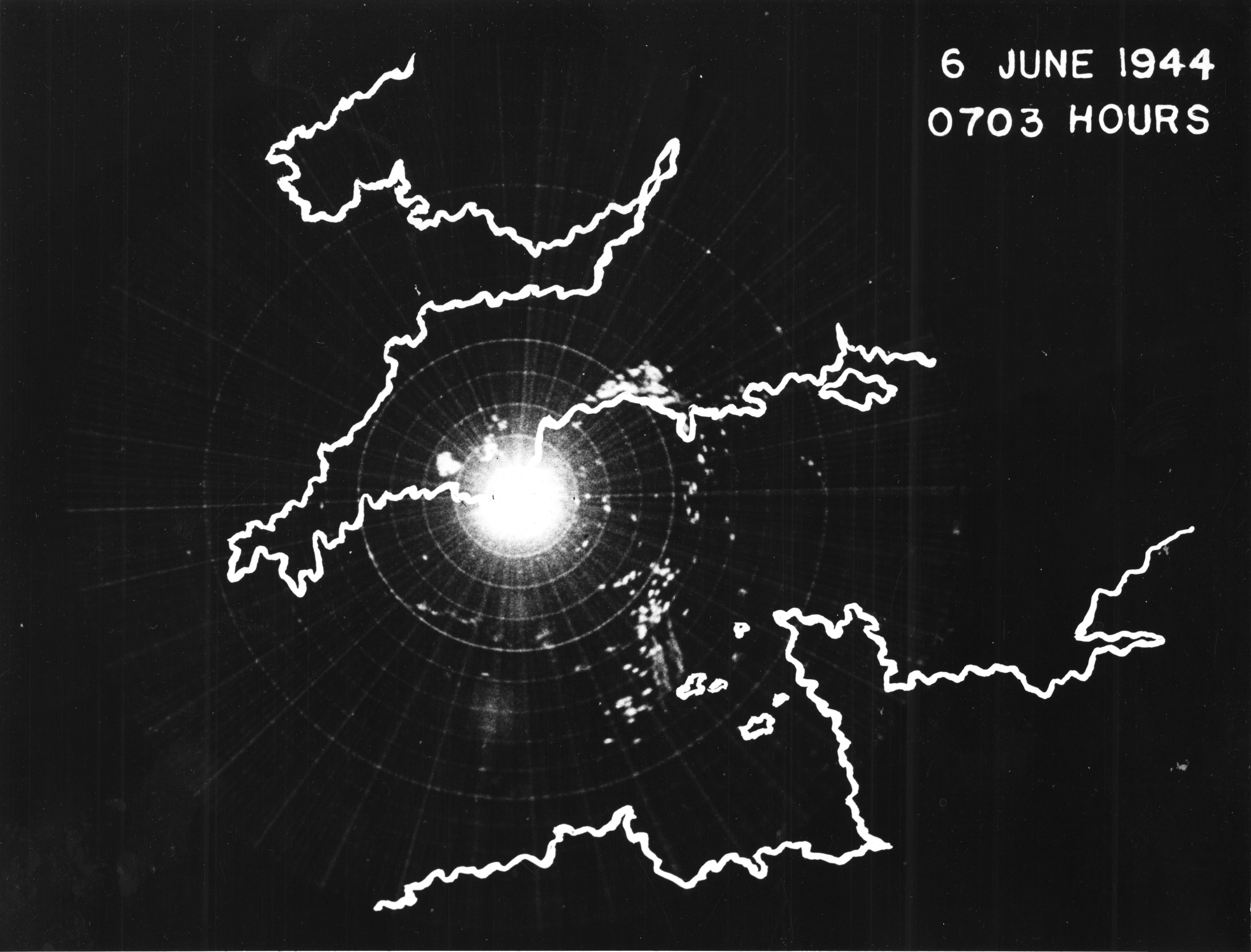
MEW scope watching the Normandy invasion

The first crash-built set reached Start Point, Devon in January 1944, completing a British chain of fighter direction stations along the south coast. On 20 March, before its communications were installed, trainee operators tracked a formation 270 kilometres (170 mi) out over the Atlantic. A telephone call to a nearby aircraft communications station, which could not see the aircraft, identified them as fourteen B-17s carrying 140 men, lost and preparing to ditch. The pilots were given their position and vectored home.

During the D-Day operations on the night of 5–6 June, the Start Point MEW maintained fighter patrols off the Brest peninsula, directed fighter-bombers to targets, and aided rescue of pilots downed in the Channel. Beyond these immediate roles, each tactical air command built its radar control network around a MEW, which served as the central element for directing offensive air strikes as well as defensive patrols.

A third set was converted to a mobile configuration in the first two weeks of May 1944, its antenna and electronics distributed across seventeen vehicles by Ninth Air Force personnel with assistance from the BBRL. The mobile MEW landed on Omaha Beach six days after the invasion and accompanied advancing armies into France. When V-1 attacks began, the English MEW relocated to Hastings, where it detected incoming bombs at 130 miles, more than twenty miles beyond any other radar, providing crucial minutes for interceptors in Operation Diver.

In the Mediterranean, a MEW installed on Cap Corse, Corsica, covered the invasion of Elba in June 1944 and the invasion of southern France that August.

==== Pacific theater ====
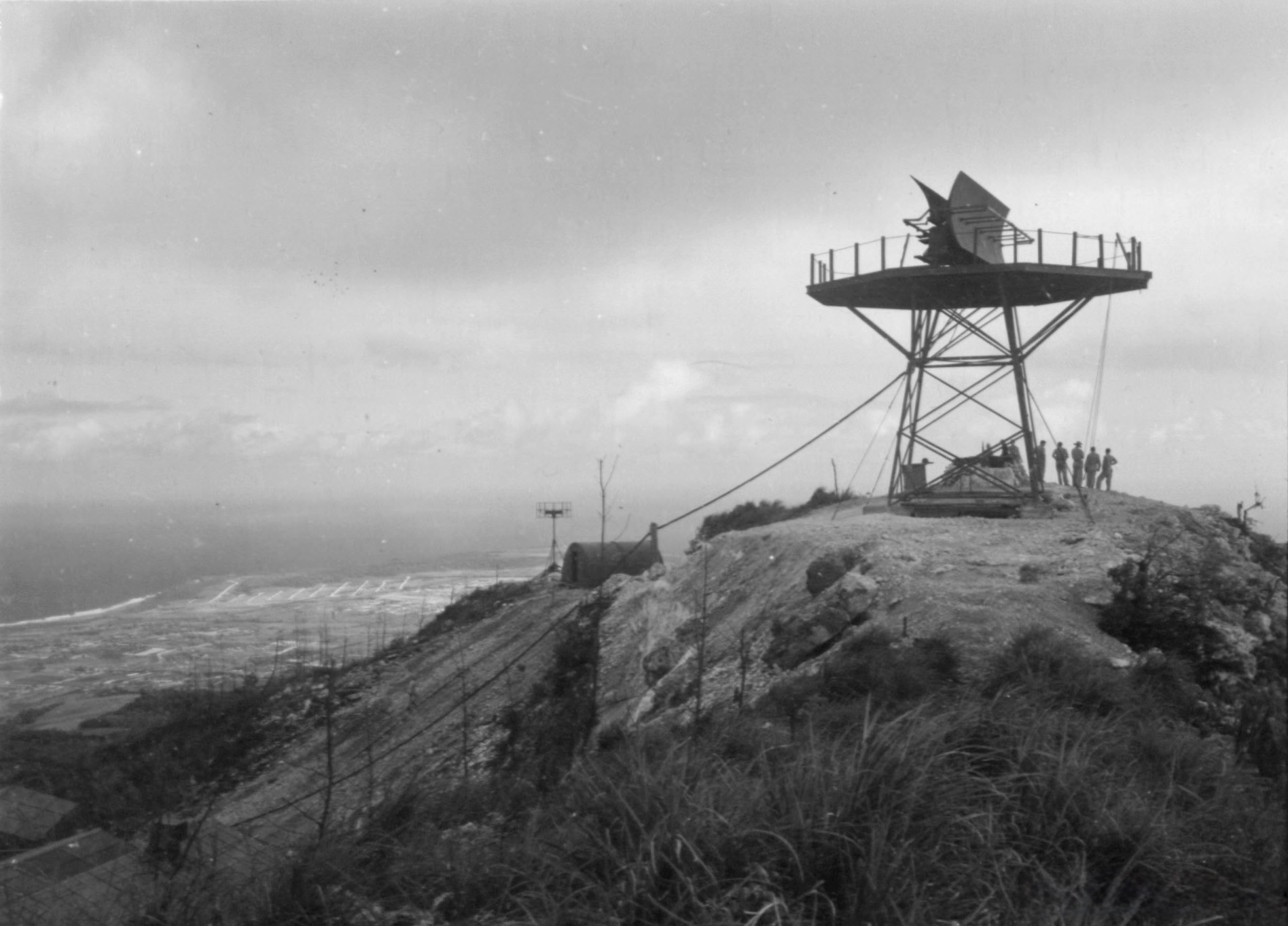
MEW antenna atop Mount Tapochau, 25 January 1945

Hap Arnold, Commanding General of the U.S. Army Air Forces, had sent MEW No. 4 to Saipan despite urgent requirements in Europe, but theater commanders showed little interest in installing it. Brigadier General Haywood Hansell preferred to save the set for Iwo Jima once captured, and the Navy, with final authority in the Pacific Ocean Areas, considered existing air defenses adequate. The set sat in crates at a temporary supply dump for months. On the night of 27 November, Japanese raiders slipped under the existing radar screen while construction lights at Isley Field were still burning. The resulting attacks destroyed eleven B-29s, seriously damaged eight more, and killed 45 Americans. Admiral Nimitz ordered highest priority for the MEW on 3 December, but the set was not operational until after the last Japanese bomb had fallen on Saipan, an "inglorious" delay that official historians attributed to divided command.

Seabees bulldozed a trail up Mount Tapochau and removed the peak with a 3,000-pound (1,400 kg) explosive charge to create a radar site. The MEW received its first signals on New Year's Eve 1944 and became fully operational on 3 January 1945, when it detected a raid at 150 miles (240 km) and tracked it to interception. Major General Orvil Anderson declared: "Within the range of MEW every one of my fighters is worth two outside its range."

=== Airborne early warning (Project Cadillac) ===
Shipboard search radar could not see beyond the horizon. Japanese pilots exploited this limitation by approaching American task forces at low altitude, beneath the beams of long-wave search sets. In 1944, this technique enabled the kamikaze attacks that made extending the fleet's radar range a top-priority Navy problem.

The solution was to put the radar in an aircraft flying high enough to see over the horizon. An interservice committee had recommended such a system in June 1942, but competing priorities kept the effort modest until the kamikaze threat emerged. In February 1944, the Bureau of Aeronautics formally requested the NDRC to establish what became Project Cadillac, named for the Maine mountain where experimental equipment was tested. Jerome Wiesner led the effort at the laboratory.

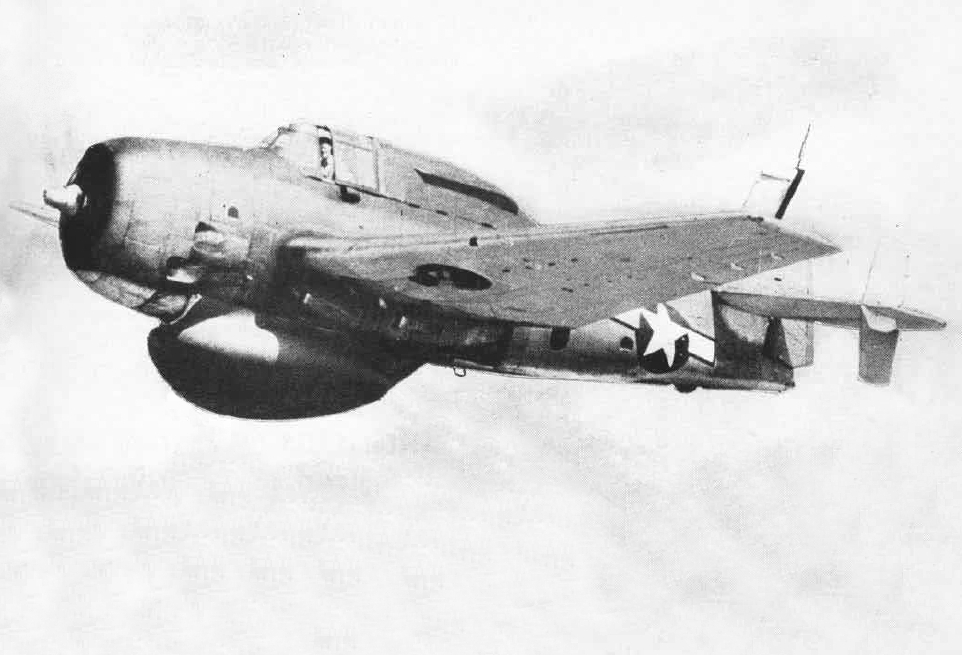
Early "early warning" model below TBM-3

The project required integrating several types of electronic equipment into a functioning "system"—a word that had begun to take on its modern use in engineering. A TBM-3 torpedo bomber was redesigned to carry 2,300 pounds (1,000 kg) of equipment. An 8-foot (2.4 m) bulbous radome housing the antenna was mounted between the aircraft's wheels; the ball turret, armor, and armament were removed. The radar operated at 10 centimeters with peak power of one megawatt. A television-derived relay link transmitted the radar picture to a combat information center aboard a ship, where operators could monitor aircraft over a wide area.

Cadillac became the largest undertaking in the laboratory's history. Nine of eleven divisions contributed. At the summer 1945 peak, approximately 20 percent of all technical staff time went to Cadillac, along with 160 Navy officers and enlisted men. Direct outside purchases for the project constituted 12 percent of total laboratory expenditures over its entire five-year existence.

The first production system was delivered in March 1945, thirteen months after the initial request. Trials aboard the carrier USS Ranger established the system's value: single aircraft flying at 500 feet could be detected at 45 to 70 miles, roughly twice the range of the best shipboard sets. Destroyers were detected at 200 miles with the aircraft at 20,000 feet, a sixfold improvement.

Cadillac arrived too late to affect the war's outcome. In June 1945, with the first system reaching the fleet, the Navy requested a second version: Cadillac II placed a combat information center in a four-engine bomber, eliminating the need for a ship. Seventeen systems were delivered by October 1945. The project was the direct forerunner of the Airborne Warning and Control System (AWACS).

== Major combat systems ==
=== Anti-submarine warfare ===
German U-boats nearly severed Britain's Atlantic lifeline in the winter of 1942–1943. Coordinated groups of submarines known as "wolfpacks" hunted ship convoys at night, surfacing to use their high speed for pursuit and escape. Existing longwave radar could detect surfaced submarines, but the meter-length waves also triggered receivers aboard U-boats, giving crews warning to submerge before aircraft arrived. In the first twenty days of March 1943, U-boats sank ninety-five Allied ships—more than 0.5 million short tons (0.45 million t)—while the Allies destroyed only twelve submarines, barely half Germany's monthly production.

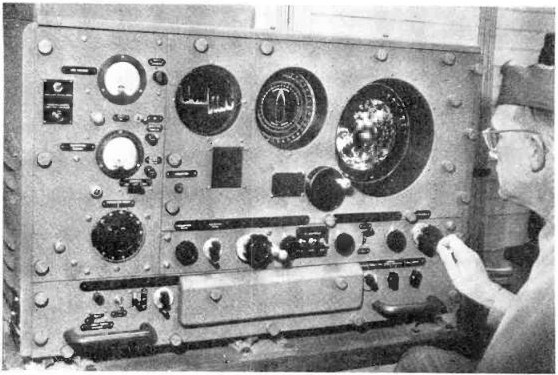
SG radar console with plan position indicator (PPI)

Microwave radar helped rebalance the fight. The laboratory's 10-centimeter ASV (air-to-surface-vessel) sets detected surfaced submarines before U-boat receivers could warn of approaching aircraft; German technology could not yet detect the shorter wavelengths. The SG radar provided similar capability for escort vessels, displaying targets on a plan position indicator that showed bearing and range at a glance. At the end of March 1943, Liberators equipped with extra fuel tanks and microwave radar, navigating by LORAN, established a shuttle service between Britain, Iceland, and Newfoundland, closing the mid-Atlantic gap where wolfpacks had operated beyond the reach of shore-based aircraft.

In May 1943, the Allies destroyed forty-one U-boats while losing forty-five merchant ships—a ratio unthinkable two months earlier. Admiral Karl Dönitz withdrew his submarines from the North Atlantic on 24 May. Although a variety of new weapons were used against U-boats, Stephen Roskill, the British naval historian, later judged that centimetric radar "stands out above all other achievements because it enabled us to attack at night and in poor visibility." (Note: Among the other decisive technologies were Leigh Lights, a carbon-arc searchlight that aided in submarine detection, and anti-submarine mortars with contact fuzes. See Kennedy 2013, Ch. 1 for the strategic importance of combined Allied technologies in the Battle of the Atlantic.)

=== Blind bombing ===
The Eighth Air Force's strategic bombing campaign faced a simple problem: weather. Cloud cover over Germany was persistent and thick. Severe storms swept the corridor between London and Berlin every three days on average. During the winter of 1942–43, heavy bombers could operate only one or two days per month.

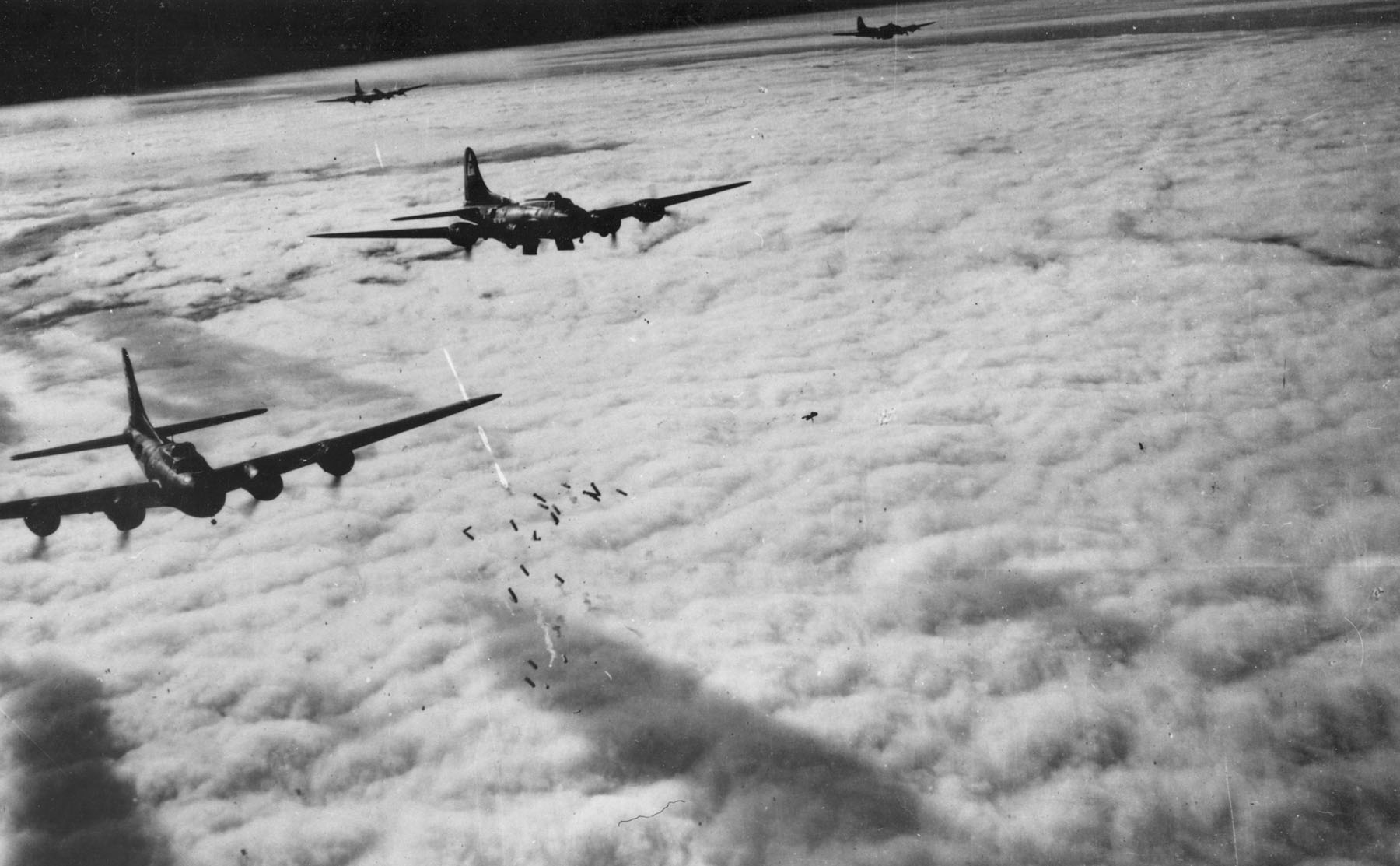
In Nov 1943, 8th Air Force bombed through clouds in Bremen, Germany

The British had developed H_{2}S, a 10-centimeter radar that displayed terrain on a scope, allowing bombers to navigate and release weapons through overcast skies. The Radiation Laboratory built H_{2}X, a 3-centimeter version with sharper resolution and immunity from German detection equipment. On 3 November 1943, nine B-17 Pathfinders equipped with H_{2}X led sixty bombers against the Wilhelmshaven docks, a target that eight previous visual missions had missed entirely.

H_{2}X increased the tempo of operations. In November 1943, no day's weather forecast would have warranted a visual attack on Germany, yet the Eighth attacked German targets nine times. In December, the Eighth dropped more bombs than in any previous month and for the first time exceeded RAF Bomber Command's tonnage. By year's end, the original twelve H_{2}X aircraft were leading 90 percent of American strategic bombing missions; bomb tonnage dropped via H_{2}X in the last two months of 1943 exceeded the total dropped by visual sighting over the entire year. From mid-October 1943 to mid-February 1944, the official Army Air Forces history notes, "the story of daylight strategic bombing from the United Kingdom is essentially the story of an experiment in radar bombing."

H_{2}X accuracy was poor by precision-bombing standards: it had a circular error probable of roughly two miles (3.2 km). (Note: Milton G. White, head of the lab's Airborne Division, wrote bluntly that "radar bombing was notably inaccurate and much worse than it needed to have been," estimating that bombing concentration was roughly two percent of theoretical potential. He attributed the gap to inadequate operator training and the absence of combat scoring methods.) However, air planners concluded that "it seemed better to bomb low-priority targets frequently, even with less than precision accuracy, than not to bomb at all." General James Doolittle acknowledged the limitations but remained committed: he "was willing to send 100 planes to do a 10 plane job" rather than wait for better equipment.

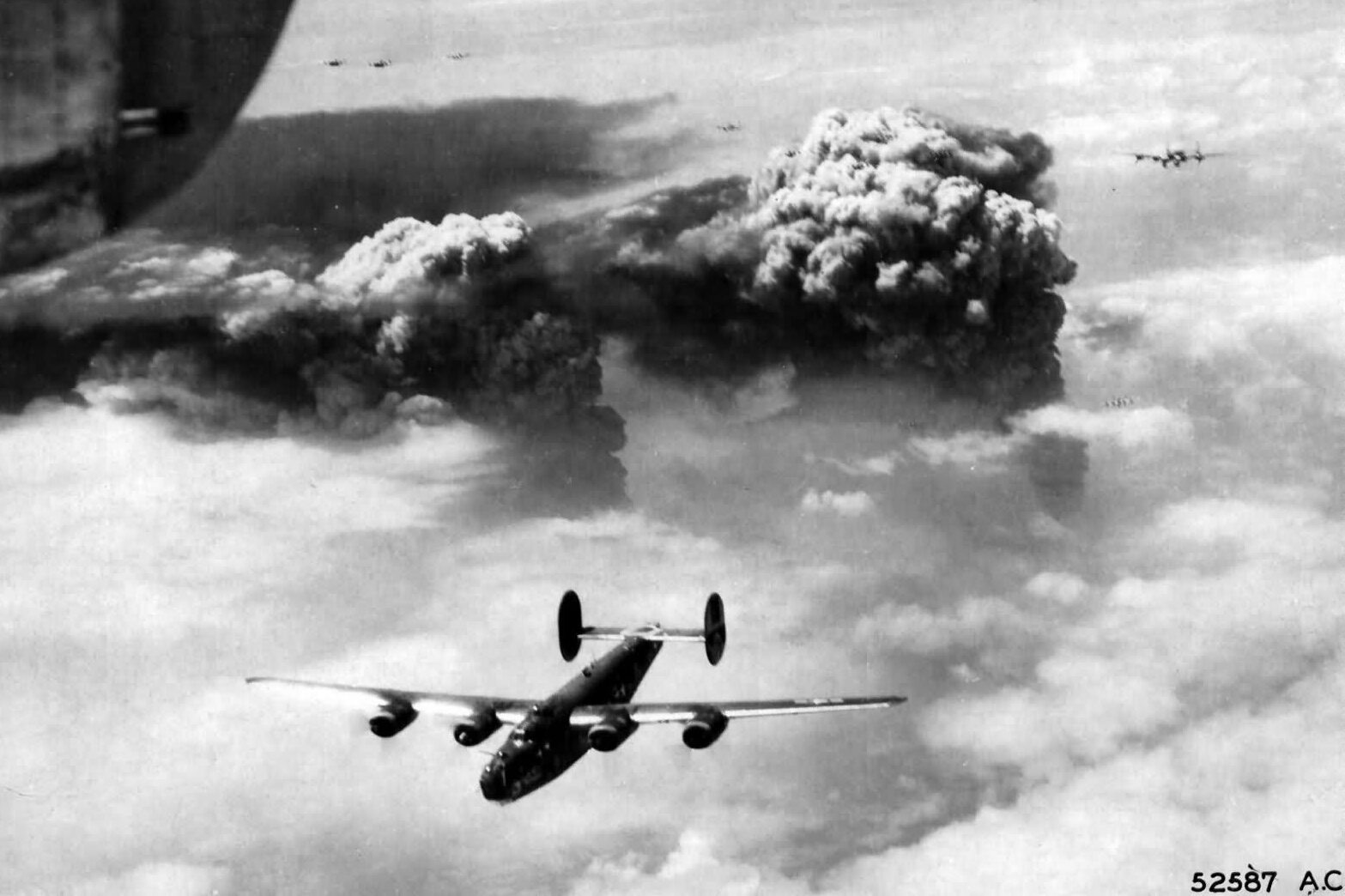
With H_{2}X, B-24s bombed refineries through smoke

The radar proved essential when Allied strategic bombing began to target oil infrastructure. On 8 June 1944, General Carl Spaatz ordered that denying oil to Germany would be the primary strategic aim—an order that remained in force until the war ended. German defenders responded with smoke screens that made visual bombing of refineries "almost impossible." The Fifteenth Air Force relied on H_{2}X to attack the Ploești refineries through artificial smoke, eventually flying twenty daylight missions that denied the Germans an estimated 1.8 million short tons (1.6 million t) of crude oil. By September 1944, German oil production had fallen to 23 percent of pre-campaign levels; of ninety-one installations still in German hands, only three were in full production.

The linear array antenna developed by the Rad Lab for MEW found a second application in Eagle (AN/APQ-7), a blind bombing radar that used a 16-foot (4.9 m) version to achieve a beam width of 0.4 degrees, narrow enough to resolve individual city blocks. Delayed by competing priorities and skepticism about the unconventional antenna, Eagle reached combat too late for extensive use in Europe, but equipped an entire wing of B-29s in the Pacific. On 6–7 July 1945, Eagle-equipped aircraft destroyed 95 percent of the Maruzen oil refinery, prompting General LeMay of the XXI Bomber Command to call the strike "the most successful radar bombing of this command to date."

=== Anti-aircraft fire control ===
Flak (1945), an Army Air Forces film on fire control techniques

Through 1941, American anti-aircraft systems were manual affairs, relying on searchlights to illuminate targets and human operators to track them. Targeting was necessarily slow and inaccurate. A common technique was to fire static barrages, hoping bombers would fly into the flak. German countermeasures, principally chaff and jamming techniques, made the British and American longwave fire-control radars nearly useless.

While the British and Canadian radar programs aimed to add microwave radar to existing manual tracking, the laboratory's physicists proposed to fully automate tracking. Louis Ridenour assembled a team including Ivan Getting and Lee Davenport to develop a radar that would lock onto targets and follow them through evasive maneuvers without human intervention. The system's basic technique was conical scanning, in which the beam of a rotating antenna followed a cone path. If the target drifted off the cone’s axis, the echo signal drove servomotors to relaign the antenna with the target. To test the concept, Getting and Davenport requisitioned a servo-driven gun turret from General Electric's B-29 program. They mounted a prototype in the Building 6 Roof Lab. Boston's air traffic was too sparse to provide test targets, so Harvard geologist Dave Griggs flew his personal Luscombe Aircraft around Cambridge to simulate an enemy plane. Davenport sat in the back seat, radioing observations. On 31 May 1941, the team achieved the first automatic tracking of an aircraft by radar.

When tested at Fort Monroe in February 1942, the prototype located aircraft with a probable error of six-hundredths of a degree in angle and 20 yards (18 m) in range.. The Army ordered over 1,200 units, designating the radar SCR-584. Connected to the Bell Labs M-9 predictor, which calculated where targets would be when shells arrived, the system transformed anti-aircraft gunnery. Ultimately, nearly 1,700 sets were produced.

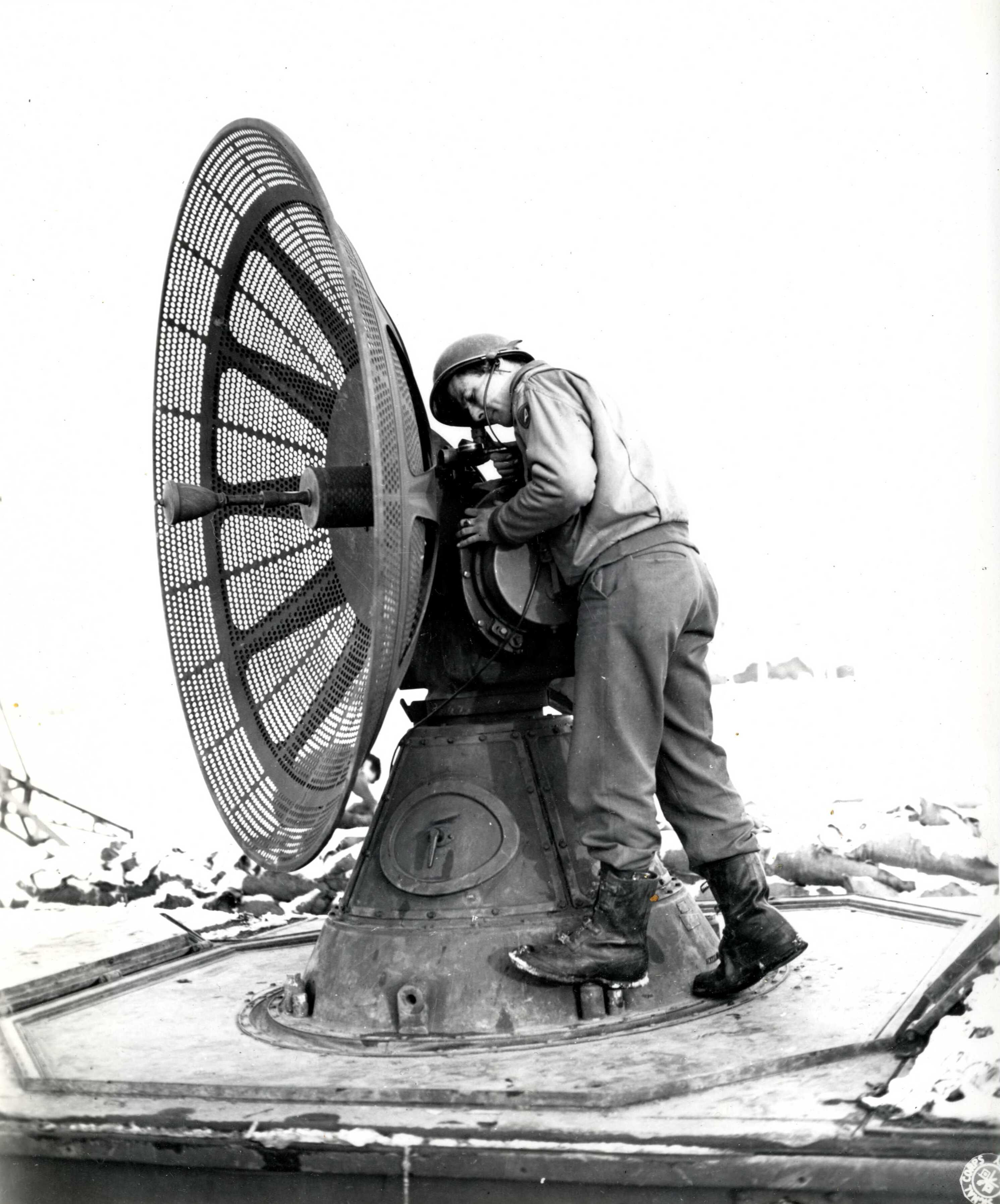
Technician with SCR-584 dish

The SCR-584's most dramatic defensive success came against the V-1 flying bomb. In June 1944, Germany began launching thousands of the "pilotless" bombs at London. The SCR-584 was combined with the proximity fuze, a miniature radar in the nose of a shell that detonated near a target and eliminated the need for direct hits. (Note: Development of the proximity fuze was a separate funding priority of the National Research Defense Committee, led by Merle Tuve in Johns Hopkins University's Applied Physics Laboratory.) In the initial defensive effort against the V-1, anti-aircraft batteries took a backseat to fighter-interceptors and barrage balloons. After improved batteries were redeployed to the coast in mid-July, the guns outpaced the other interception methods, destroying 1,286 flying bombs in six weeks. On the final day of the main V-1 assault, guns shot down 68 of 104 bombs detected.

The SCR-584 also proved versatile in offense. A modified system created a basis for guiding tactical aircraft to bomb concealed targets that pilots could not see. Prior to its debut, issues with visual target recognition had made close air support ineffective or dangerous in combat. With support from the British Branch of the Rad Lab, ground controllers used the SCR-584 to track incoming friendly fighters and radio corrections to pilots to find their targets. A BBRL demonstration on 25 June 1944 made the case for the improvised system. At a site near TRE headquarters in Malvern, camouflaged officers listened to a loudspeaker as a controller directed Typhoon pilots by radio. As the countdown reached zero, the squadron leader wheeled into a 120-degree turn dove directly toward the observers, having located them solely through radar guidance.

The first operationally modified SCR-584 reached Normandy on 9 July. During the snow-covered Ardennes counteroffensive in January 1945, friendly troops were visually indistinguishable from foe. MEW and SCR-584 were used together to provide aircraft with navigational control, allowing airborne attacks on German armored divisions through overcast skies.

== Wartime scale ==
By 1945, the Radiation Laboratory's research program had produced approximately 150 distinct radar systems for land, sea, and air use, along with the LORAN navigation network. Alfred Loomis' official NDRC summary report estimated that every dollar spent on Division 14 research and development had yielded over ten dollars' worth of military equipment. Measured by dollar value, equipment of Rad Lab design accounted for $640 million of the $1.2 billion in American radar produced during the peak year of 1944, representing over half of total output and the vast majority of microwave systems. Over the course of the war, equipment designed at the laboratory constituted 48 percent of the $2.819 billion the United States spent on radar, or approximately $1.35 billion (equivalent to $19.1 billion in 2025).

The laboratory was not the sole source of Allied radar development. Director DuBridge cautioned against overstating the laboratory's role, noting that "the radar effort of the Allies went forward on a very large scale at a host of research, development, and manufacturing centers." Britain's Telecommunications Research Establishment provided the cavity magnetron and pioneered systems like H_{2}S. Bell Labs contributed components research and systems engineering. Among its institutional collaborators, the Rad Lab was distinguished by the size of its operations, its rapid development of new microwave systems, its comprehensive technical documentation, and its field operators that followed experimental equipment into combat use.

== Postwar legacy ==
=== Lab closure and transition ===
The Radiation Laboratory closed on December 31, 1945. In the final months, DuBridge organized an effort to extract lasting value from the wartime work, even as the enterprise was dismantled.

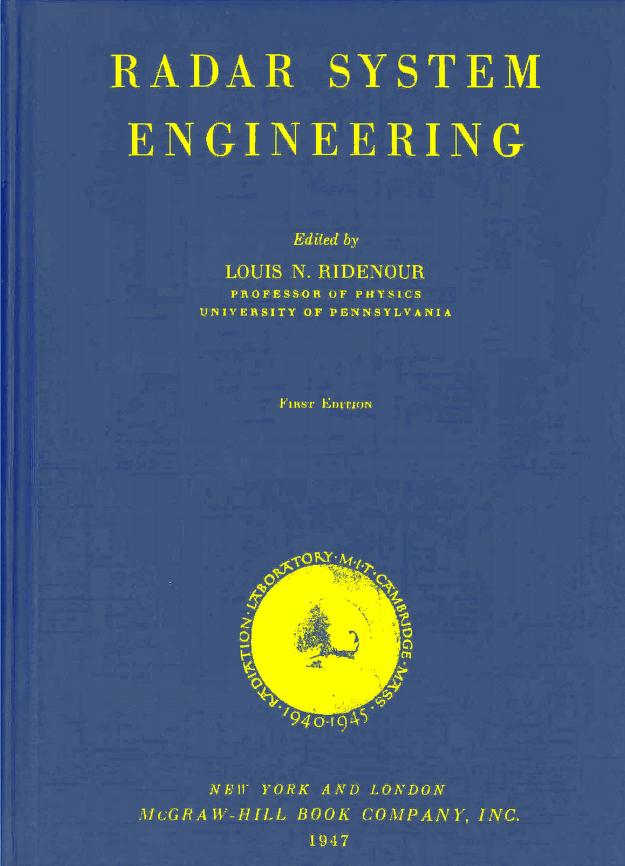
First of 28 volumes in the Rad Lab Series

The laboratory's technical knowledge was collected in the MIT Radiation Laboratory Series, a 28-volume compilation edited by Louis Ridenour and published by McGraw-Hill between 1947 and 1953. Rabi had initiated the project in fall 1944, concerned that without systematic documentation "there would only be one group who would know all this technology—the Bell Telephone Laboratories." OSRD set aside $500,000 to fund an Office of Publications that operated independently after the laboratory closed; some 250 staff members stayed to work as authors and editors. Because the Series was produced with federal funds, the contract returned all royalties to the United States Treasury and limited the publisher's copyright to ten years from the date of publication, after which the technical content entered the public domain. Rabi deemed the completed effort "the biggest thing since the Septuagint." The physicist Louis Brown observed that individual volumes could be found on the bookshelves of nearly every electronics engineer and experimental physicist for more than a generation.

At MIT itself, NDRC established a Basic Research Division immediately after the Radiation Laboratory closed, continuing fundamental work on the electromagnetic properties of matter at microwave frequencies. On 1 July 1946, this division was absorbed into the new Research Laboratory of Electronics (RLE), an interdisciplinary program bridging physics and electrical engineering, directed by Julius Stratton and housed in the lab's Building 20. A companion Laboratory for Nuclear Science and Engineering was created alongside it. Supported with unrestricted funds from the Joint Services Electronics Program and equipped with a million dollars' worth of surplus Rad Lab equipment, RLE began with twenty-six former lab staff members and quickly became a leading center for microwave spectroscopy, electronic computing, and atomic clocks.

In 1951, MIT established Lincoln Laboratory to develop air defense systems, building directly on RLE's expertise in radar and digital computing. Located adjacent to Hanscom Air Force Base, which had hosted the Radiation Laboratory's flight tests during the war's final year, Lincoln grew rapidly to a staff of two thousand and an annual budget approaching $20 million. Its first major project, the SAGE air defense network, became the largest military R&D enterprise since the Manhattan Project, eventually costing $8 billion (equivalent to $66.6 billion in 2025).

=== Influence on research institutions ===
The Radiation Laboratory demonstrated what MIT physicist John Slater called the "complementarity of basic and applied research." Slater argued that scientists and engineers working together in an interdisciplinary setting could accomplish far more than either could alone, and that such laboratories should supplement the traditional departmental structure of universities.

The wartime contracting model pioneered by OSRD shaped postwar university research. The pattern established at MIT was replicated elsewhere: the Office of Naval Research (ONR), drawing on millions of dollars from canceled procurement contracts, became the dominant patron of academic research before the National Science Foundation existed. By August 1946, ONR had issued 177 contracts worth $24 million to eighty-one universities and laboratories. Cost-reimbursement contracts covering direct expenses plus overhead, and the short-form patent clause granting the government title to inventions, became standard features of federal research funding. By 1946–1947, MIT's research budget of $8.3 million dwarfed its academic budget of $4.7 million, a relationship that would persist. Stuart Leslie has argued that this "golden triangle" of military agencies, defense industry, and research universities reshaped American science in ways that extended well beyond budgets, channeling research toward military applications at the expense of other priorities.

The Rad Lab broadly influenced the organizational structure of post-war research. Technology historian Robert Buderi characterized the wartime approach as "interdisciplinary, cooperative, hard-driven," and noted that this manner of working shaped postwar academic, industrial, and government laboratories. Daniel Kevles observed that the Rad Lab and Manhattan Project accustomed young physicists to research with few financial constraints. At the Rad Lab, staff could simply sign an order for instruments that would have required lengthy faculty deliberation before the war. University administrators doubted that able scientists would willingly return to heavy teaching loads, meager equipment, and low salaries.

Alumni brought Rad Lab principles into the institutions of post-war science. Rabi and Norman Ramsey drew on their Rad Lab experience when organizing Brookhaven National Laboratory in 1946 as a shared facility for East Coast universities. The Rad Lab produced two RLE directors, Julius Stratton and Jerome Wiesner, who each became president of MIT; Wiesner also served as science advisor to President Kennedy. DuBridge, the lab's director, became president of the California Institute of Technology in 1946, a position he held for twenty-three years. He served on science advisory bodies to Truman and Eisenhower before becoming science advisor to President Nixon in 1969.

=== Technological and regional impact ===
The Boston area was not an electronics center before the war. The Radiation Laboratory and the smaller Harvard Radio Research Laboratory transformed it into one. A 2023 study in the American Economic Review found that Middlesex County experienced a "nearly thirtyfold increase in electronics patenting during the war," with patenting in 1960 remaining ten times prewar levels.

The Rad Lab has been credited with jump-starting the Boston region's Route 128 technology corridor by establishing an ecosystem of universities, government laboratories, and firms. RLE gave rise to fourteen companies in its first two decades, most specializing in microwave electronics and devices. Lincoln Laboratory spawned additional spinoffs. A 1961 study by a Boston bank suggested replacing the textile spindle with the Hawk missile as the symbol of the local economy.

Commercial applications proliferated. Raytheon, General Electric and Westinghouse built marine radar and air traffic control systems derived from wartime designs. The SG radar became the basis for postwar navigation systems, and the Microwave Early Warning radar influenced civilian air traffic control. LORAN was adopted by commercial shipping and aviation and expanded worldwide. Microwave techniques opened more than two hundred times as many radio channels than had previously existed, enabling the postwar expansion of telecommunications. The lab's need for reliable crystal rectifiers in radar equipment spawned research contracts for semiconductor dopants and purification methods, a precursor to the boom in postwar solid-state electronics.

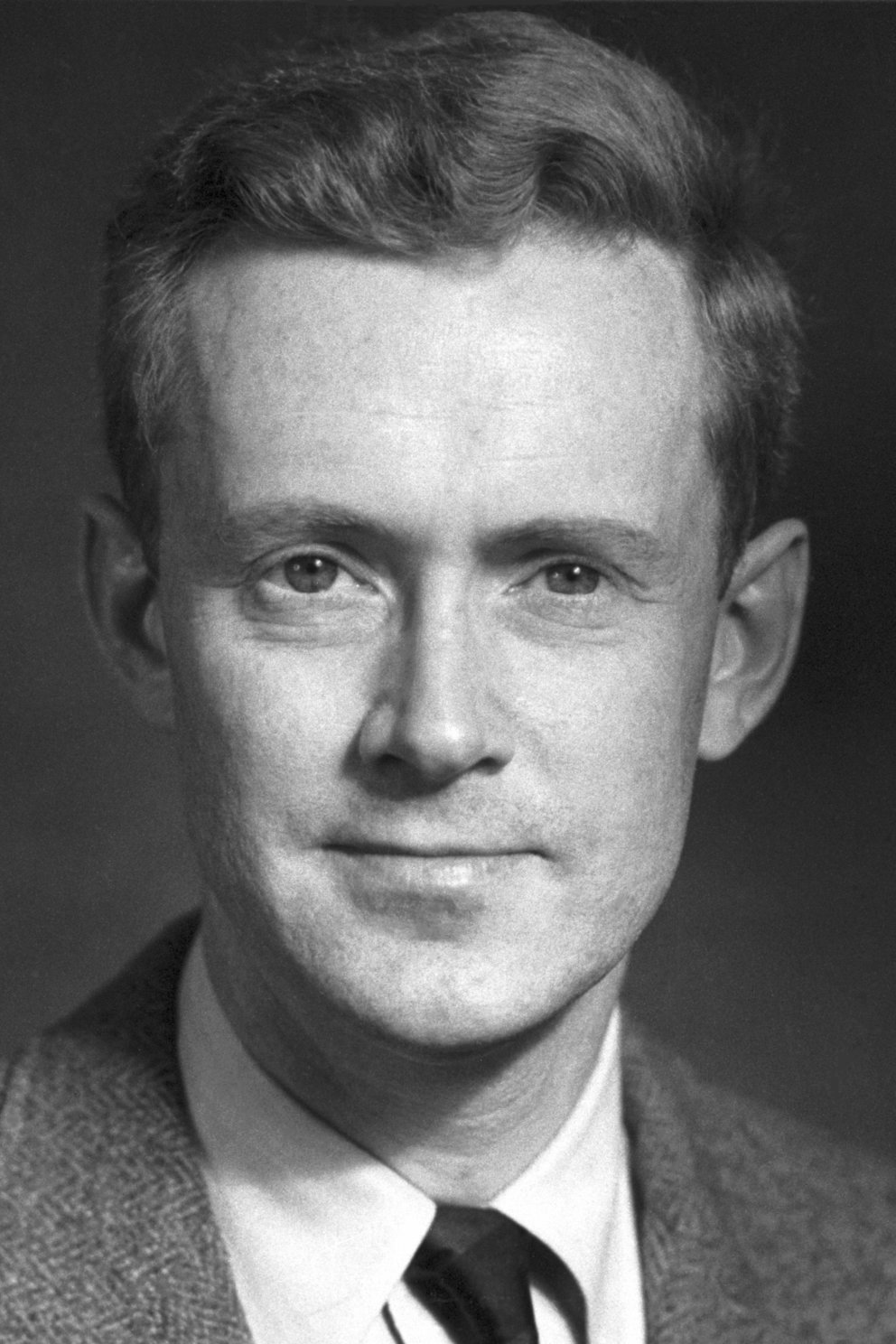
Ed Purcell's work on receivers led to his 1952 Nobel Prize for nuclear magnetic resonance

The laboratory's influence extended through its personnel. Several laboratory members moved between the major wartime research centers: Kenneth Bainbridge, Edwin McMillan, and Luis Alvarez, among others, worked at both the Rad Lab and Los Alamos before the war ended. Ten laboratory members, including five of the first twenty staff, later won Nobel Prizes.

- Luis W. Alvarez (Physics, 1968)
- Hans A. Bethe (Physics, 1967)
- Edwin W. McMillan (Chemistry, 1951)
- Edward M. Purcell (Physics, 1952)
- Isidor I. Rabi (Physics, 1944)
- Norman F. Ramsey, Jr. (Physics, 1989)
- Paul A. Samuelson (Economics, 1970)
- Julian S. Schwinger (Physics, 1965)
- John Hasbrouck Van Vleck (Physics, 1977) (Note: Van Vleck served as a part-time consultant to the Radiation Laboratory's Theory Group while remaining on Harvard's faculty.)
- Jack Steinberger (Physics, 1988)

Edward Purcell's Nobel Prize for nuclear magnetic resonance can be traced directly to his wartime radar work. Denis Robinson, who founded a particle accelerator manufacturer with Rad Lab colleagues after the war, found that mentioning his wartime Radiation Laboratory experience was "like an 'open sesame' to leading physicists in the United States and Britain." The laboratory was designated an IEEE Milestone in 1990.

== See also ==
- Radar in World War II
- Telecommunications Research Establishment (TRE)
- SAGE project
- Industrial laboratory
