= Scientists Against Time =

History book by James Phinney Baxter III

- Pulitzer Prize in History 1947
- Author: James Phinney Baxter III
- Language: English
- Genre: Non-fiction
- Publisher: Little, Brown and Company
- Publication date: 1946
- Publication place: United States
- Pages: 473

Scientists Against Time is a nonfiction history book by James Phinney Baxter III. It was published in 1946 by Little, Brown and Company, and won the 1947 Pulitzer Prize for History.
