= British Branch of the Radiation Laboratory =

Radar field operation of the MIT Radiation Laboratory

Coordinates: 52.1043°N 2.3254°W

- Established: 1 October 1943
- Research type: Operations
- Field of research: Microwave radar
- Directors: Lauriston C. Marshall (Oct 1943-Feb 1944); John G. Trump (Feb 1944–April 1945)
- Staff: 100
- Location: Great Malvern, England
- Campus: Grounds of Malvern College
- Affiliations: National Defense Research Committee
- Operating agency: Radiation Laboratory (MIT)

The British Branch of the Radiation Laboratory (BBRL) was an American field laboratory established in September 1943 to support microwave radar operations in the European theater of World War II. Based at Great Malvern, England, alongside the British Telecommunications Research Establishment (TRE), BBRL was staffed by the MIT Radiation Laboratory and funded by the National Defense Research Committee.

BBRL pioneered the "field laboratory" model of wartime science: civilian scientists and engineers accompanying experimental equipment into combat zones, debugging systems under operational conditions, and feeding experience back to development laboratories. General Carl Spaatz, commanding U.S. Strategic Air Forces in Europe, called the organization "one of the most important factors contributing to our success" in air operations over the continent.

The laboratory grew to approximately 100 personnel and established an Advanced Service Base in Paris after the Allied liberation in summer 1944. BBRL supported the introduction of blind-bombing radar that enabled strategic bombing through overcast, precision navigation systems, and ground-controlled fighter direction techniques that proved critical during the Battle of the Bulge. A companion facility, the American British Laboratory of Division 15 (ABL-15), operated alongside BBRL to handle radar countermeasures.

== Origins ==
=== Existing scientific field operations ===
The United States Office of Scientific Research and Development (OSRD) had maintained a presence in Britain since early 1941 through its London Mission, which coordinated the exchange of scientific information between American and British research establishments. Radar liaison was a core function from the start. Kenneth Bainbridge of the Radiation Laboratory arrived in March 1941, less than three weeks after the Mission's establishment, to study British radar developments.

A succession of Radiation Laboratory staff members handled radar liaison through the Mission: Frank D. Lewis from May 1941, David B. Langmuir from September 1942, and H. Guyford Stever jointly with Langmuir in the first half of 1943. These arrangements sufficed for exchanging information and demonstrating equipment, but by 1943 the expanding American air campaign required something more substantial.

By 1943, the MIT Radiation Laboratory was shipping radar systems to combat theaters faster than normal development cycles allowed. Ordinarily, laboratory prototypes were turned over to industrial suppliers who adjusted designs to military standards before mass production. But pressure from combat commanders led the laboratory to manufacture limited quantities of "crash" devices for direct shipment to theater before systematic testing could be completed. Systems that had not been validated under controlled conditions required laboratory personnel to accompany them because the scientists who had built a device were often the only people who understood how to install it properly and develop techniques for its use. Ad hoc arrangements had sent individual Radiation Laboratory staff members to Britain throughout 1942 and 1943; BBRL systematized this work into a permanent organization.

The rationale extended beyond technical support. Information about enemy radar and jamming techniques was held under extremely high security classification, making it difficult to transmit across the Atlantic through multiple channels. In Britain, such information could be discussed directly between operational groups and scientific staff, often before written reports were prepared. A nearby technical group could respond to urgent problems and shift research priorities on short notice.

The need was reciprocal. As Louis Ridenour later observed, "All of us technical people" had tended "to overemphasize the importance of gadgetry" while ignoring "its operational use." Scientists in theater could observe how crews actually employed equipment and identify whether problems were technical or matters of training and technique.

=== Establishment ===
Discussions about a permanent American radar organization in Britain began during the Compton Mission in the spring of 1943, when MIT President Karl Compton, NDRC chairman James B. Conant and other officials explored Anglo-American scientific cooperation. The Mission recommended establishing both an American radar laboratory and a separate radar countermeasures group at Great Malvern, to work in close cooperation with TRE while remaining autonomous.

In August 1943, Louis A. Turner of the Radiation Laboratory held preliminary conferences with TRE superintendent A. P. Rowe and other British officials. Key principles were established: the American radar and countermeasures groups would not share a common administration; the director would have complete local authority over American staff; and first priority would go to the needs of United States forces in the European theater.

On September 9, 1943, Radiation Laboratory director Lee DuBridge formally requested OSRD approval to establish BBRL as a regular division of the laboratory, with its director reporting directly to DuBridge. The stated purpose was "to provide in England scientific personnel and facilities which will make possible, through cooperation with British scientists and with the American and British Services, a more extensive and effective use of radar in the European war."

NDRC formally approved the establishment on October 1, 1943. The OSRD London Mission lent H. Guyford Stever to the Radiation Laboratory that autumn to help with preparations. Financial arrangements were worked out at a conference in MIT President Karl Compton's office on October 11, and the MIT Corporation authorized commitments in Great Britain under the existing Radiation Laboratory contract.

== Organization ==
=== Malvern headquarters ===
BBRL established its headquarters at Great Malvern, Worcestershire, a spa town in the Malvern Hills where TRE had relocated after German bombing of its previous coastal site. The choice reflected the original intention of close collaboration with British radar scientists, though in practice each laboratory was "predominantly absorbed in its own problems."

Initially housed in temporary quarters in the main TRE building and a brick hut previously used by Canadian radar workers, BBRL eventually occupied six purpose-built brick huts with corrugated iron roofs on sloping grounds below the main school building. These provided 7,300 sq ft (680 m^{2}) of floor space for laboratories, a machine shop, stockroom, and administrative offices. Staff crowded into billets at the County Hotel, where their boisterous presence unsettled the elderly ladies in residence.

By July 1944, the staff numbered 99 people: 78 from the Radiation Laboratory, 11 manufacturers' representatives assisting the services with production equipment, and 10 British employees supplied by TRE. The organization resembled the Radiation Laboratory in miniature, with divisions for airborne radar (S.J. Simmons), ground radar (E.G. Schneider), navigation systems (J. Curry Street), and components (W.H. Jordan).

The majority of staff were "perpetually in the field," working at air bases across Britain and the European front; those who remained at Malvern—administrative, shop, and secretarial personnel, plus the components division—made up between one-half and two-thirds of the total.

=== Leadership ===
Lauriston C. Marshall, an original member of the Radiation Laboratory and key member of its Steering Committee, was chosen as first director and arrived in England on September 20, 1943. He spent much of his time in London, transacting official business through the facilities of the OSRD Mission, while Theodore G. Anderson handled day-to-day administration at Malvern as business manager.

In February 1944, John G. Trump, then secretary to NDRC Division 14, was chosen to reorganize and expand the laboratory. He arrived in late February with Lee DuBridge, Louis Ridenour, and Edward L. Bowles, traveling by Air Transport Command with the highest priority. Trump remained director until the end of April 1945, except for a two-month visit to the home laboratory in autumn 1944, during which J. Curry Street served as interim director.

Historian Daniel Kevles described Trump as "charming" and "patient" as BBRL director. Trump kept the laboratory working even on British holidays, "partly because of my feeling that holidays are immoral, at least for Americans."

=== Advanced Service Base (Paris) ===
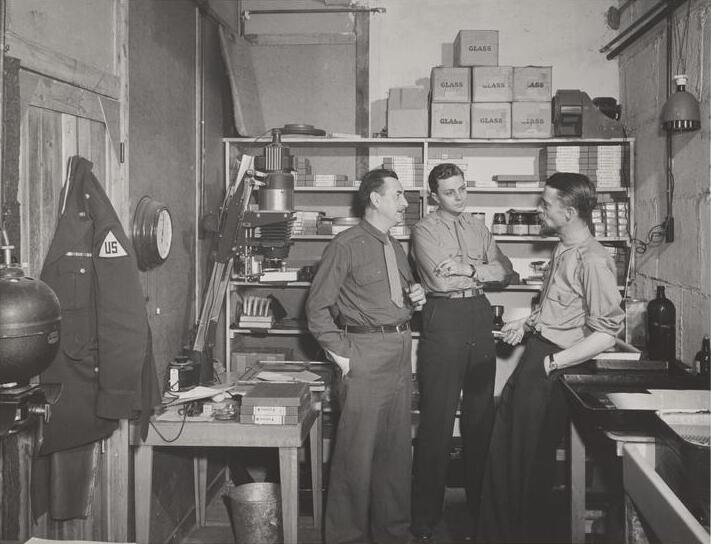
Storage room at the Paris Advanced Service Base

As Allied forces liberated France, BBRL established an Advanced Service Base (ASB) in Paris in September 1944. The base was housed in the plant of the Société Française Radioélectrique (S.F.R.), whose director, Maurice Ponte, was a French radar pioneer and magnetron expert. The location was recommended by Samuel Goudsmit, head of the Alsos Mission scientific intelligence effort, who had already established his headquarters in Paris.

The Paris operation started modestly—"only the beginnings of an installation, a few tools, and a small stockroom"—but expanded in early 1945 when machine tools and mechanics were flown directly from the Defford experimental airfield to Villacoublay in five C-47 transports. Ray Herb directed the ASB, with H.C. Kendall as deputy.

Working conditions were difficult. Like thousands of other Americans in Paris during the severe winter of 1944–45, ASB personnel endured unheated hotel rooms and weeks without hot water. The Army liquor ration "helped appreciably in the battle against the weather." The base provided repair and maintenance facilities for projects across the continent and served as headquarters for personnel with permanent assignments to the tactical air forces.

== Relationship with other organizations ==
=== American British Laboratory of Division 15 (ABL-15) ===
BBRL was not the only American laboratory at Malvern. The American British Laboratory of Division 15 (ABL-15) was established simultaneously to handle radar countermeasures designed to jam or deceive enemy radar. ABL-15 operated under a contract with Harvard University, which ran the Radio Research Laboratory (RRL), Division 15's principal countermeasures facility.

The first ABL-15 group of about thirty persons, under Victor H. Fraenckel of General Electric, was established across the road from TRE. When Fraenckel joined General Carl Spaatz's staff as an advisory specialist, John N. Dyer of CBS became director. The staff eventually reached sixty-eight.

The two laboratories shared the Advanced Service Base in Paris, though ABL-15 staff initially felt their participation on the continent would be limited unless the Eighth Air Force shifted its headquarters from England. Together, the countermeasures work was credited with saving the U.S. Strategic Air Force in England alone an estimated 450 aircraft and 4,500 casualties.

=== Telecommunications Research Establishment ===
BBRL's location at Malvern was chosen to facilitate collaboration with TRE, Britain's primary radar development establishment. The relationship provided BBRL with access to TRE's experimental airfield at Defford, accumulated British operational experience, and practical support. TRE supplied ten British employees to BBRL and occasionally served as a purchasing agent, using its priority status to procure items unavailable on the open market.

In practice, however, "collaboration with TRE was by no means as intimate as had originally been envisaged." Each laboratory was absorbed in its own problems, though there was "profitable interchange of information between the two groups."

=== Advisory Specialist Group ===
Edward L. Bowles, expert consultant to the Secretary of War on radar matters, maintained a separate organization of Advisory Specialist Groups attached to air force headquarters. His consultants and BBRL sometimes found themselves with overlapping responsibilities. Before formal liaison arrangements existed, BBRL and ABL-15 were energetically linked to the air force command through Dave Griggs, a physicist on Bowles's staff and private pilot who was rapidly becoming an emphatic proponent of strategic air power.

Bowles was skeptical of the field laboratory model, preferring to dispatch specialists after conducting preliminary surveys rather than maintaining a standing organization in theater. In September 1944 he confided that he "fully expect[ed] the BBRL people to be unable to go beyond the bounds of technical comprehension of the operational problems."

The tension eased in November 1944 when Trump took Louis Ridenour's place as senior radar member of the Advisory Specialist Group, linking the two organizations and eliminating competing lines of authority. Ridenour proceeded with Bowles to the Pacific to survey needs there.

== Technical programs ==
BBRL worked most closely with the Eighth Air Force, which conducted strategic bombing of Germany from bases in England, and the Ninth Air Force, which provided tactical support for ground operations. The laboratory's technical programs fell into several operational categories: enabling bombers to strike through overcast, guiding aircraft to targets with ground-based systems, providing long-range navigation, and directing tactical aircraft in support of ground forces.

=== Bombing through overcast skies ===
H_{2}X radar set

The Eighth Air Force's doctrine of high-altitude daylight precision bombing depended on clear skies over targets—a scarce commodity in northern Europe. BBRL's largest early effort addressed this problem by supporting introduction of H_{2}X, a 1.2 in (3 cm) radar that displayed terrain features on a cockpit screen, allowing bombardiers to identify cities and industrial areas through solid cloud cover.

Work on H_{2}X consumed about half of total BBRL effort in the winter of 1943–44, including maintenance of "crash program" sets, construction of a trainer, and development of a prototype scope camera. Twelve B-17s equipped with preproduction sets arrived at Alconbury—headquarters of the 482nd Pathfinder Group—in early October 1943. Two Radiation Laboratory staff members accompanied them with the specific mission of keeping the hastily assembled handbuilt equipment "operating as satisfactorily as possible as much of the time as it may be."

The system reorganized the bombing campaign. H_{2}X-equipped pathfinders led formations to targets that weather would otherwise have protected, and by year's end the original dozen sets were leading 90 percent of U.S. bombing missions. General Jimmy Doolittle declared he was "willing to send 100 planes to do a 10 plane job" rather than wait for more accurate equipment. Accuracy remained poor compared to visual bombing—circular error averaged about 2 mi (3.2 km) — but the ability to maintain pressure through the winter months proved strategically decisive.

=== Precision bombing by ground control ===
While H_{2}X allowed bombing through overcast, its accuracy was limited by the difficulty of interpreting radar returns. For attacks requiring precision—against specific factories, rail yards, or military installations—the Allies developed systems in which ground stations tracked the aircraft and signaled the exact moment to release bombs.

Initially, BBRL collaborated with TRE on Oboe, the most accurate such system. Two ground stations in England tracked a bomber flying a predetermined arc; operators could determine the aircraft's position over the Ruhr within yards, often more precisely than the aircrew themselves knew it. BBRL supervised installation of Oboe equipment in B-26 and A-20 aircraft, trained eighteen crews, and handled maintenance until the Air Force could operate independently in summer 1944.

When operational experience showed that consistent performance required higher transmitter power, BBRL proposed adapting the SCR-584 gun-laying radar as a ground station. The Radiation Laboratory and BBRL modified eight sets on a crash basis, with special modification kits shipped from Cambridge.

When the Eighth Air Force needed similar capability for tactical targets in spring 1944, BBRL improvised a system called Micro-H using equipment already in theater. Unlike Oboe, which required specially equipped ground stations, Micro-H worked with the standard H_{2}X radar interrogating ground beacons, requiring no modification to aircraft already equipped for blind bombing.

The military had doubts about the Micro-H, but those doubts substantially ended in October 1944 when clouds and rain grounded most Allied fighters and General George S. Patton found Germans relentlessly driving back part of his tank force. Ground-control radar operators guided two volunteer fighter squadrons to the battle. The planes broke through the clouds and caught the German tanks in the open—their commanders had never expected aircraft on a day like that—destroying at least six and forcing the rest to flee.

=== Long-range navigation ===
Bombers flying deep into Germany needed reliable navigation to find targets and return safely, particularly at night or through weather. The British Gee system provided hyperbolic navigation using synchronized ground transmitters, but its range barely reached the Ruhr. The RAF pressed for an American system called Loran that could extend coverage almost to the Eastern Front.

BBRL installed the European chain of "sky-wave synchronized" Loran stations, which exploited ionospheric reflection to achieve ranges impossible with ground-wave signals alone. After diplomatic difficulties over frequency allocation were resolved, the system went operational on September 7, 1944, and radiated nightly thereafter. The RAF used it for approximately 22,000 bombing sorties; the system largely made possible Bomber Command's final assault on Berlin.

=== Fighter direction and close air support ===
BBRL's most innovative work came in adapting radar for offensive operations—using ground stations not merely to warn of enemy aircraft but to control friendly fighters and direct them onto targets.

The key instrument was the Microwave Early Warning radar (MEW), a massive system weighing 66 short tons (60 t) that could track aircraft at ranges exceeding 175 mi (282 km). Milton A. Chaffee and A.G. Bagg of the Radiation Laboratory surveyed British fighter direction stations and concluded that MEW should be configured for offensive control, not merely defensive reporting. Installed at Start Point in Devon under BBRL supervision, MEW became operational in late March 1944 and provided a comprehensive picture of air operations during the Normandy invasion. A veteran British fighter control officer gave it "the highest marks for its ability to deal with large numbers of planes."

For close support of ground forces, BBRL developed techniques using the SCR-584, originally designed to direct anti-aircraft fire. Ground controllers who knew the range and bearing to a target could track incoming fighter-bombers on radar and radio course corrections, putting aircraft onto camouflaged positions that pilots could never have identified during brief attack runs. In a demonstration on June 25, 1944, Typhoons dive-bombed a target on a controller's countdown while observers listened over a loudspeaker. The first operational system reached Normandy two weeks later.

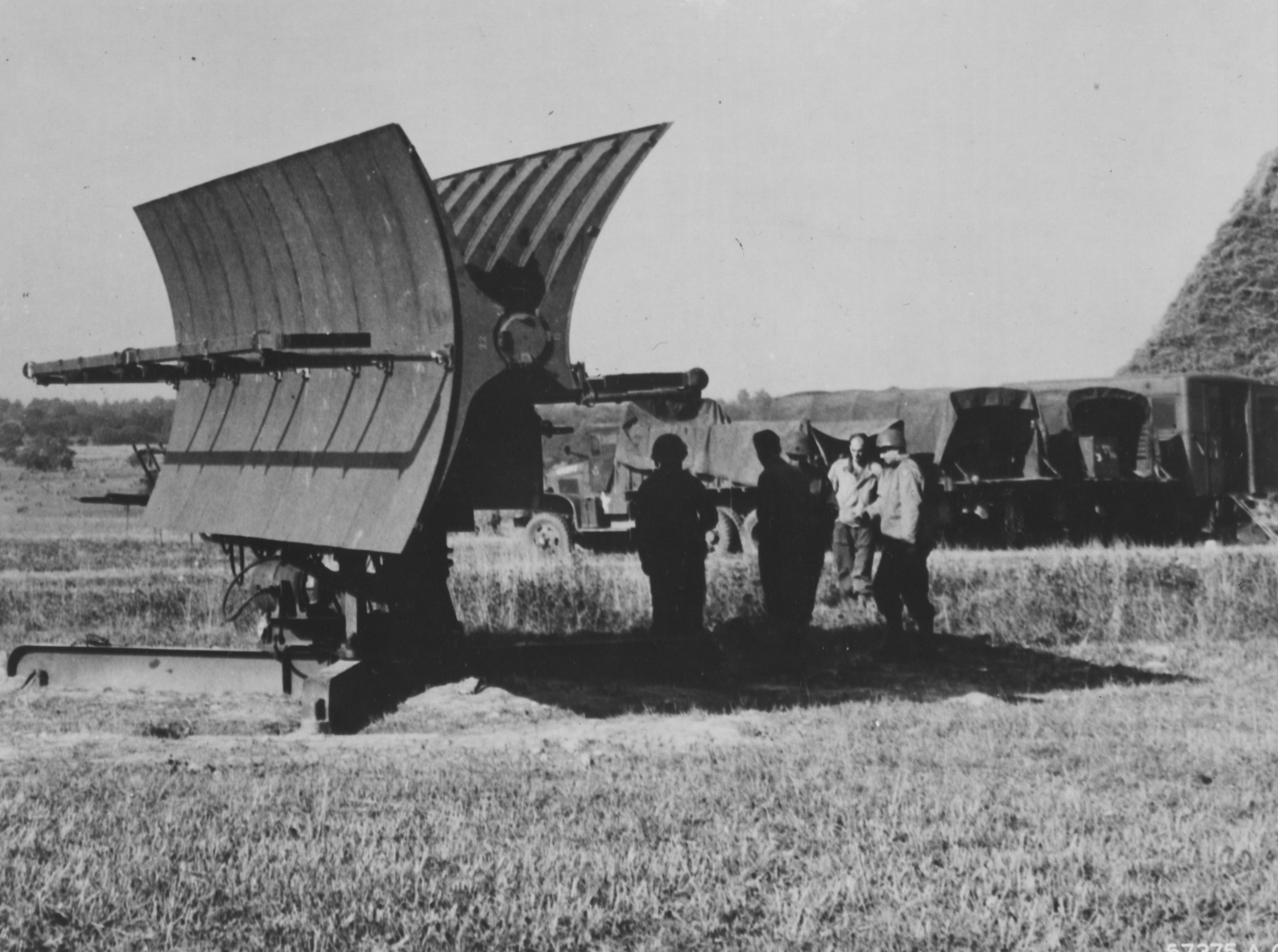
Mobile MEW unit with vehicle fleet

BBRL also helped mobilize MEW for continental operations, fitting the entire installation into seventeen vehicles so it could follow the advancing front. Major General Pete Quesada, commanding IX Tactical Air Command, called MEW "the best offensive instrument in his possession." General Orvil Anderson, fighting in the Pacific, added that "within the range of MEW every one of my fighters is worth two outside its range."

==== The Ardennes emergency ====
The German offensive in the Ardennes in December 1944 tested these systems under extreme pressure. As fog and snow grounded visual operations, radar-directed aircraft continued to fly. SCR-584 stations tracked both friendly and enemy vehicles, preventing fighter-bombers from attacking Allied columns retreating through the confusion. Quesada reported that "the number of American lives saved by our ability to stop attacks on our own columns cannot be measured."

On New Year's Day 1945, when the Luftwaffe launched its final major offensive with approximately 800 aircraft, anti-aircraft batteries guided by SCR-584 claimed 394 enemy planes in three hours. One Oboe ground station came within 11 mi (18 km) of the advancing German spearhead before the offensive was contained.

== Closure ==
Even as the Normandy campaign succeeded, sentiment grew at the Radiation Laboratory and OSRD that BBRL's usefulness would soon end and attention should shift to the Pacific. However, Advanced Service Group member Louis Ridenour, returning to Cambridge in autumn 1944, "strongly opposed the sentiment he found widespread that the support of BBRL could be considerably curtailed without injuring the war effort."

Trump remained director until late April 1945. By the German surrender in May, the London Mission's activities had largely shifted to scientific intelligence work, with staff serving on teams investigating German research facilities. The broader OSRD demobilization terminated most NDRC contracts by August 31, 1945.

== Legacy ==
=== Assessment by commanders ===
Senior American commanders credited BBRL with a meaningful role in air operations over Europe. In September 1944, General Carl Spaatz wrote to General Henry Arnold:

A substantial part of the success that our air operations in this theater have enjoyed is due to the prompt introduction into field use of the most modern types of radar equipment, both airborne and ground.... In addition, one of the most important factors contributing to our success has been the specialized technical assistance in a field Laboratory (BBRL), a civilian organization operating under contract of the Office of Scientific Research and Development.

General Frederick Anderson urged that BBRL "should be redeployed when this phase of the war is over to carry our experience to the other theaters," describing it as "an excellent training ground for personnel who will go to other theaters."

=== The field laboratory model ===
BBRL pioneered what historians have called the "field laboratory" model—distinct from both traditional military research and from operations research. As historian William Thomas has argued, wartime field science developed along two parallel tracks: operations research groups that statistically analyzed operational data, and field laboratories like BBRL that focused on installation and technical adaptation of new equipment.

The official OSRD historian, James Phinney Baxter, emphasized this distinction. BBRL and ABL-15, he wrote, "were not fundamentally laboratories in the home sense of the word but rather pools of personnel, equipment, shop, and know-how," charged with "modification, debugging, assistance in use of new devices, and all the myriad things which needed to be done to accelerate the efficient use of the many new techniques which were being thrust into the theater at such a rapid rate."

When OSRD established the Office of Field Service (OFS) to coordinate civilian scientists in the Pacific theater, the newer ventures were shaped more in the mold of BBRL than of operations research. The Operational Research Section in Hawaii—despite its name—was led by Lauristen C. Marshall, BBRL's first director, and its personnel were overwhelmingly technical specialists rather than operations analysts.

The close collaboration between scientists and military operations departed sharply with Axis practice. In April 1945, BBRL director John Trump interview captured leaders of Telefunken's radar development program in defeated Germany. He learned that German industrialists did not work closely with university researchers, and that "it was virtually impossible for a scientist or engineer to accompany radar equipment into combat areas to observe its performance or to assist in training." Trump concluded that this organizational gap had cost Germany dearly, causing the German program to severely lag its American counterpart despite its early advantage.

== See also ==
- MIT Radiation Laboratory
- Radio Research Laboratory
- Telecommunications Research Establishment
- Oboe (navigation)
- SCR-584 radar
- H2X radar
- Alsos Mission
