= John G. Trump =

American electrical engineer (1907–1985)

John Trump
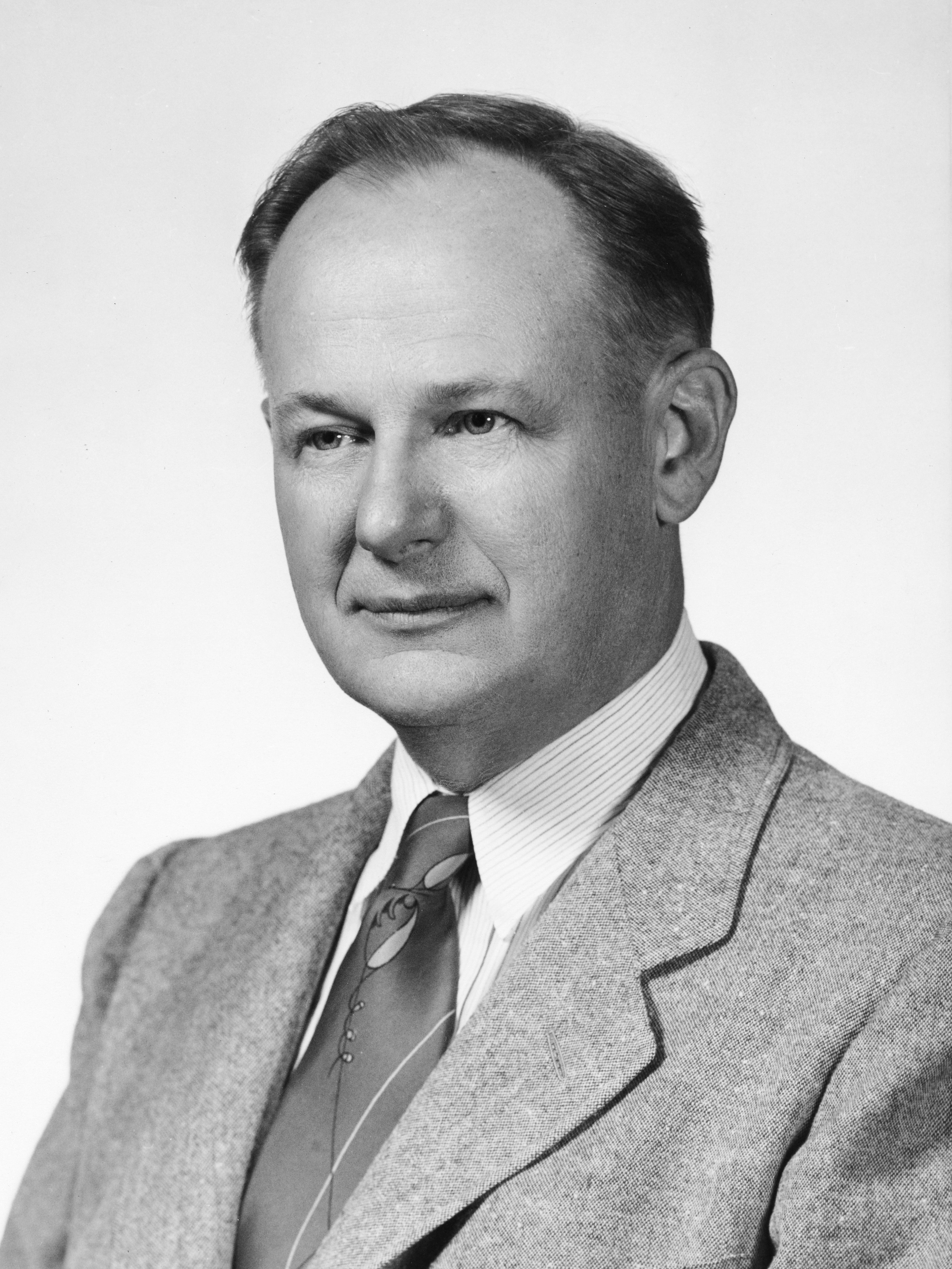
- Trump in 1954
- Born: John George Trump; August 21, 1907; New York City, New York, U.S.
- Died: February 21, 1985 (aged 77); Cambridge, Massachusetts, U.S.
- Education: Polytechnic Institute of Brooklyn (BS); Columbia University (MS); Massachusetts Institute of Technology (ScD)
- Known for: Van de Graaff generator Rotational radiotherapy Electron beam sterilization of wastewater
- Spouse: Elora Sauerbrun
- Children: 3
- Parents: Frederick Trump (father); Elizabeth Trump (mother)
- Family: Trump family
- Awards: King's Medal for Service (1947); President's Certificate of Merit (1948); Lamme Medal (1960); National Medal of Science (1983)
- Scientific career
- Fields: Electrostatics; Electrical engineering; Cancer radiology
- Workplaces: Massachusetts Institute of Technology
- Thesis: Vacuum Electrostatic Engineering (1933)
- Doctoral advisor: Robert J. Van de Graaff
- Doctoral students: Elias Gyftopoulos; Henry C. Bourne Jr.
- Other notable students: Jay Wright Forrester (MS); Louis Smullin (MS); Mac Van Valkenburg (MS)

John George Trump (August 21, 1907 – February 21, 1985) was an American electrical engineer and professor at the Massachusetts Institute of Technology (MIT). He pioneered the use of high-voltage generators in cancer treatment and was founding chairman of High Voltage Engineering Corporation, a leading manufacturer of particle accelerators.

Trump received his electrical engineering doctorate as an early student of MIT physicist Robert J. Van de Graaff. He joined MIT's faculty in 1935 and designed compact, high-voltage Van de Graaff generators for use in cancer radiotherapy. Trump later directed MIT's High Voltage Research Laboratory, which developed new radiotherapy techniques, trained radiologists, and treated more than 10,000 patients. Under Trump, the lab explored the generation and use of electrostatic power in medical sterilization, spacecraft propulsion, wastewater disinfection, and direct current power transmission.

Ahead of American entry into World War II, Trump joined the National Defense Research Committee (NDRC), the government's main effort to organize civilian scientists for war. As technical aide to Karl Compton, he helped establish the Radiation Laboratory to develop microwave radar. He served on the lab's steering committee and as an NDRC divisional secretary, managing the NDRC's portfolio of radar contracts. In February 1944, he went to England to direct the Rad Lab's field operation in Europe. There, he organized radar deployments for the D-Day invasion, aided interception of V-1 missiles, and advised American commanders on radar use in combat. He received service commendations from President Truman and King George VI.

In 1946, Trump organized the High Voltage Engineering Corporation (HVEC) with Van de Graaff and Denis Robinson to build compact Van de Graaff accelerators for cancer therapy. They received one of the first three investments of the American Research & Development Corporation, the first modern venture capital firm. As chairman, Trump oversaw the company's growth and debut on the New York Stock Exchange. HVEC became the largest global supplier of research particle accelerators as government funding for nuclear science expanded, and later diversified into industrial products.

Trump retired from the MIT faculty in 1973 and remained active as a trustee of Boston's Museum of Science and board chairman of the Lahey Clinic, a regional hospital. President Reagan awarded Trump the National Medal of Science in 1983 for the "beneficial application of ionizing radiation to medicine, industry and atomic physics." Trump was the paternal uncle of Donald Trump, the 45th and 47th president of the United States.

== Early life and education ==
=== New York years (1907–1931) ===
Born in the Bronx, New York City, on August 21, 1907, John Trump was the youngest of three children born to German immigrants Frederick and Elizabeth Christ Trump. After the Queensboro Bridge opened in 1909, the family moved to Queens, eventually settling in the Woodhaven neighborhood. When Trump was 11, his father died in the 1918 influenza pandemic, leaving his mother to support the family.

Like his siblings, Trump attended Richmond Hill High School, where he was a gifted student. He joined Western Electric's Manhattan engineering office in 1923, two years before it became known as Bell Labs.

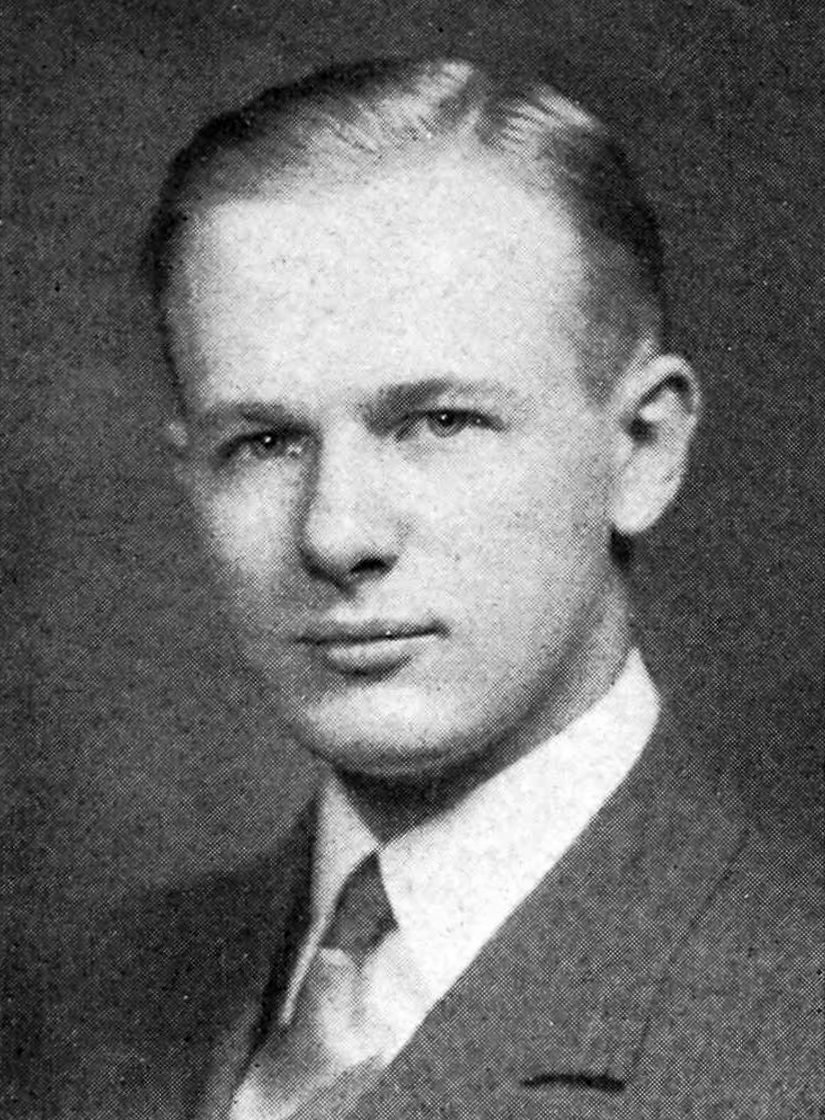
Brooklyn Poly yearbook portrait (1929)

Both John Trump and his older brother Fred joined their family's real estate firm. Their mother hoped that Fred would build homes and John design them. With support from his brother, John enrolled at Brooklyn Polytechnic Institute to study architecture. The brothers' work together ended due to differences in business philosophy: Fred preferred to sell units as they were planned; John thought they should only sell once constructed. By the end of his freshman year, John left the family real estate business and switched his concentration from architecture to engineering.

Selected as Brooklyn Poly's valedictorian, Trump graduated in 1929 with a bachelor's degree in electrical engineering. While teaching electrical engineering at his alma mater, he earned his master's degree in physics from Columbia University in 1931.

=== MIT doctorate (1931–1933) ===
In fall 1931, Trump arrived at the Massachusetts Institute of Technology (MIT) to pursue a PhD in electrical engineering. MIT's new president, the physicist Karl Compton, was recruiting scientists to strengthen basic research at the institute. Vannevar Bush, dean of MIT's engineering school, recommended Trump work with one of these recruits: Robert J. Van de Graaff, a 29-year-old physicist developing a new electrostatic generator. Van de Graaff became Trump's advisor and lifelong collaborator.

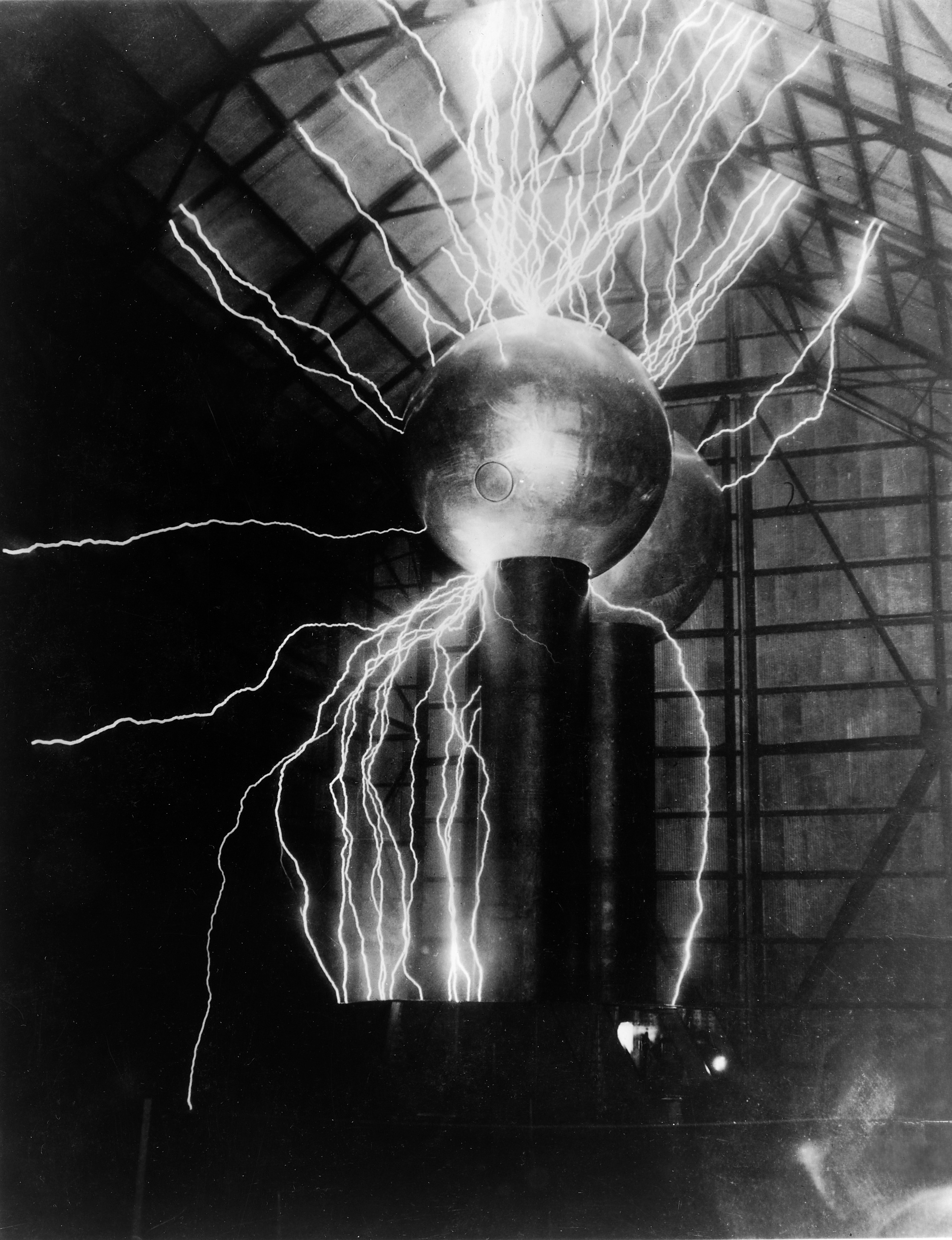
Streamers arcing from the Round Hill generator

Van de Graaff sought to build a generator with sufficiently strong electric potential to artificially split the atom. He split his research between open-air models, which required large terminals, and vacuum-insulated designs, which were compact but technically challenging. In 1933, Van de Graaff demonstrated the Round Hill generator, a 43-foot (13 m) air-insulated generator that produced dramatic electrical arcs and attracted broad press coverage. But the demonstration also revealed the design's fundamental limitation: high voltages broke down in open air.

To overcome these limits, Trump worked on vacuum techniques. He designed a synchronous alternating-current motor to power a vacuum, which proved highly efficient. Encouraged by this practical innovation, his dissertation also proposed a method to build vacuum-insulated, long-distance transmission lines for high-voltage direct current. In 1932, Van de Graaff filed to patent components in the transmission system. The new Tennessee Valley Authority showed interest in developing these patents for its hydropower projects, and Vannevar Bush offered to license them to the TVA by assigning them to the Research Corporation. Though the transmission project fell through, MIT became the first private university with a policy of research commercialization, and its arrangement was an influential predecessor to university patent licensing.

Trump received his doctorate of electrical engineering in 1933. His thesis, Vacuum Electrostatic Engineering, described these contributions and examined the factors governing voltage-insulation strength in vacuums.

== Early career ==
After graduating, Trump remained at MIT as a research associate, then became an assistant professor in 1936. His research focused on improving high-voltage generators and finding new uses for them in industry.

While writing his thesis, Trump had learned about an MIT lecture on medical uses of high-voltage x-rays. At the time, low-voltage radiotherapy techniques could only target superficial tissues and required long exposures that damaged skin. Because Van de Graaff sources produced steady, controllable, power that other high-voltage sources could not, Trump hypothesized that they could produce penetrating, precise x-rays that could target deeper tumors.

In May 1935, Trump showed that striking a gold target with the Van de Graaff electron beam produced abundant x-rays. The Godfrey M. Hyams Trust funded the construction of a 1-MV generator for Harvard's Huntington Memorial Hospital, which entered service in March 1937. The first of several hospital generators Trump would build, it required a room-sized voltage terminal with an internal focusing coil suspended over the patient in the room below. Though just one-third the height of the Round Hill generator, its operators saw it as "magnificent monster." Radiologists reported that it provided "increased depth dosages, greater skin sparing, and greater intensity" than radium exposure, then the prevailing technique. The first patient treated by the Huntington machine survived beyond four years. However, Huntington Hospital survived only another four years, and the machine was shut down in 1941.

Trump focused his research on making hospital generators smaller and more controllable. He adopted a pressurized gas (SF_{6}) system developed by Raymond Herb, which allowed him to increase dielectric strength at a smaller size. He built a compact 1.25-MV generator for Massachusetts General Hospital in 1940, which treated patients for sixteen years. He built another generator for the Philadelphia Oncologic Hospital. Trump's pre-war generator installations have been acknowledged as precursors to the field of radiosurgery.

Trump's gas-insulated generator would find other commercial applications. With World War II engulfing Europe and Asia, the United States began expanding its military fleet production. With engineers at Boston Navy Yard, Trump discovered that his high-voltage x-ray generator could detect manufacturing defects in ships and aircraft. Robert Van de Graaff carried this work forward through MIT's High Voltage Radiographic Project, supplying generators for Navy efforts to inspect ship hulls and captured enemy munitions.

== World War II service ==
=== Radiation Laboratory administration ===
During World War II, Trump interrupted his research on x-ray therapy to work on military uses of microwave radar. In June 1940, Vannevar Bush organized the National Defense Research Committee (NDRC) to direct the White House's wartime research strategy. Trump joined the NDRC as technical aide to MIT president Karl Compton, who chaired the committee's radar and detection section (Division D).

In October 1940, British scientists demonstrated secret microwave transmitters to the United States, offering radar dramatic improvements in resolution and range. NDRC members pressed Compton to organize a research effort at MIT. On October 24, Trump attended the preliminary planning conference in Compton's office alongside Alfred Loomis, Lee DuBridge, and NDRC secretary Edward L. Bowles. The group identified laboratory space, and within a week submitted a funding proposal to the NDRC. On November 11, the newly christened Radiation Laboratory held its first personnel meeting. By mid-December, about 30 physicists had begun work in hastily converted space in MIT Room 4-133.

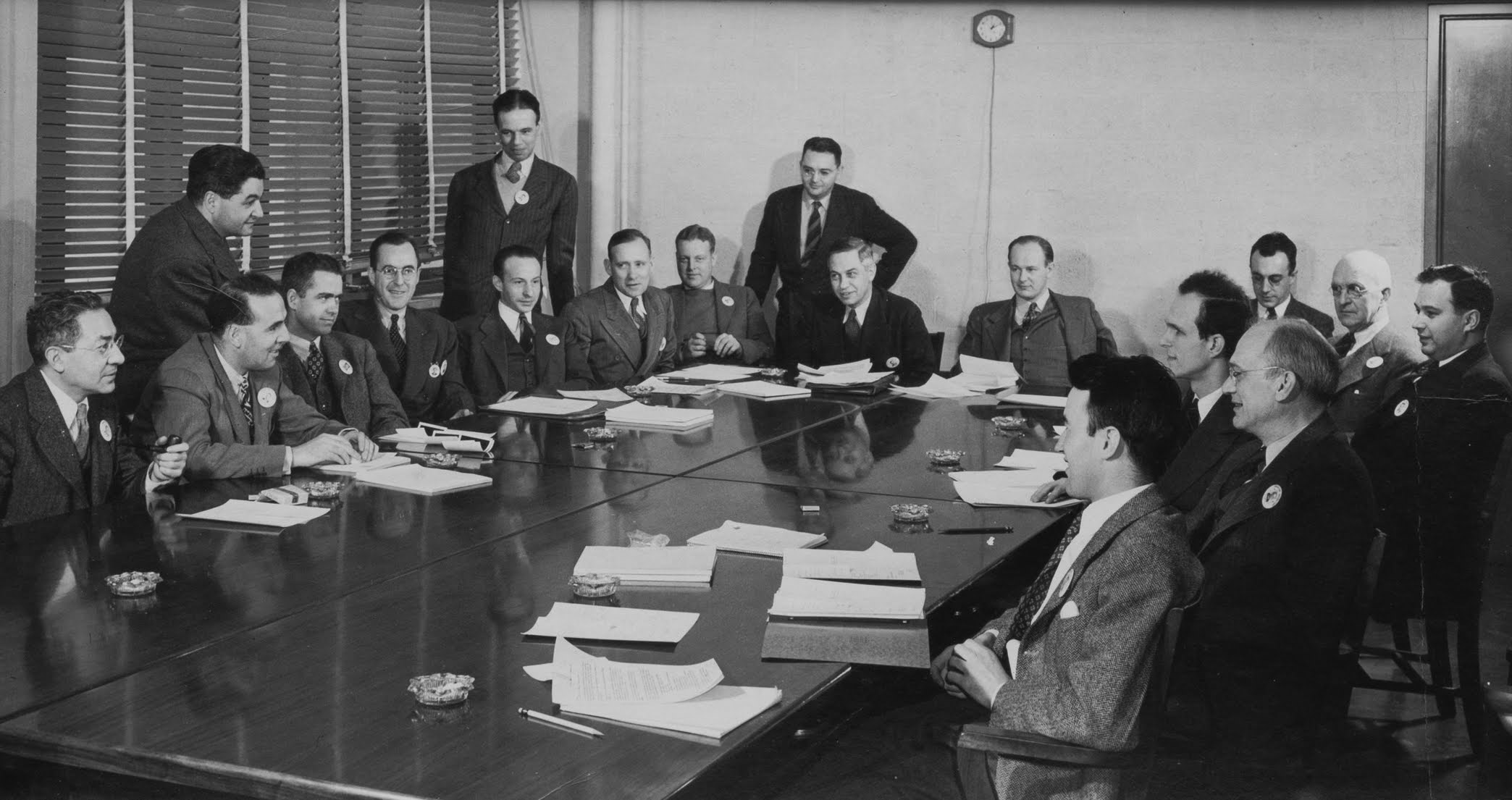
Rad Lab Steering Committee (Trump at center, seated)

The Rad Lab's first year focused on conceptual radar research. As Compton's NDRC aide, Trump oversaw the NDRC's contract with MIT, the first and largest university contract of the war. The attack on Pearl Harbor pushed the lab into radar equipment production, and its rapid expansion pulled Trump deeper into its business operations. In March 1942, the lab adopted a new divisional organization, and director Lee DuBridge appointed Trump to its Steering Committee, the body that set research priorities and approved projects. The next month, Trump succeeded Bowles as secretary of the Microwave Committee, the NDRC body supervising all government radar research contracts.

Trump combined his oversight role with his existing responsibilities as NDRC representative at the Rad Lab. By 1942, Trump's NDRC office had grown to five staff members and five secretaries, and became "a very important administrative unit in the radar program." In December 1942, the Microwave Committee became Division 14 (Radar) under an NDRC reorganization. From an office in the Rad Lab, Trump's supervised the lab's contract and policy while giving its scientific leadership wide operational freedom. The radar program spent $1.5 billion across university and industrial contracts, becoming the NDRC's largest program and comparable in scale to the $2 billion Manhattan Project.

During Trump's tenure in the Rad Lab's administration, it grew into the war's largest civilian research contractor. At its peak, the lab employed 3,879 personnel, constructed three buildings on the MIT campus, opened field operations around the world, and fulfilled $110,758,000 in government research contracts—roughly 80 percent of the United States' radar research budget. The lab introduced capabilities including early warning systems, gun-laying fire control, and bombing through cloud cover, giving American forces a growing technological advantage.

=== Review of Tesla papers ===
Following the death of Nikola Tesla in January 1943, the U.S. Office of Alien Property Custodian requested Trump's support to examine the notes, papers, and artifacts left by the inventor. Tesla had offered the U.S. Army a license to unspecified secret weapons, and officials believed his belongings might contain designs for a promised high-voltage "death ray." Tesla had bequeathed the items to his nephew, a Yugoslavian government official. OAPC was reluctant to send them to a Nazi-occupied country without prior review.

Then a government employee, Trump was called upon for his expertise in direct-current electrical equipment, which overlapped Tesla's work. After a three-day investigation in Manhattan, Trump reported in a classified memo to OAPC that the materials had neither military value to the United States nor would "constitute a hazard in unfriendly hands." In the memo, Trump expressed admiration for Tesla's well-known inventions, but assessed that his late-career ideas were "somewhat promotional" and "did not include new sound workable principles or methods." In a box purported to contain a part of Tesla's "death ray", he found a 45-year-old multidecade resistance box.

After many of these personal items disappeared, the Federal Bureau of Investigation received letters accusing it of suppressing Tesla's design for a secret weapon. Technical papers describing the weapon were discovered at Yugoslavia's Nikola Tesla Museum in 1984 and did not overturn Trump's assessment. (Note: Trump's OAPC memo on the papers, previously discussed by Tesla biographers, was released publicly by the FBI in 2017.)

=== Service in Europe (1944–1945) ===
Late in 1943, the NDRC established the British Branch of the Rad Lab (BBRL) at Great Malvern, England, home of the British Telecommunications Research Establishment, to coordinate radar support for the planned invasion of Europe. In February 1944, Trump was chosen to reorganize and expand the overseas laboratory, and was tasked with clarifying its relations with the British service, securing more staff, and determining its program for the coming months. What was expected to be a three- or four-month assignment would last fifteen months, from D-Day planning until the fall of Berlin. On February 26, Trump flew to England with DuBridge, Bowles, and physicist Louis N. Ridenour. He would expand BBRL into a roughly 100-member field operation.

Trump was one of a few civilians briefed on secret Operation Overlord (D-Day) plans. He served on a joint civilian committee advising SHAEF on the use of radar and countermeasures in the invasion, and worked alongside a separate Advisory Specialist Group (ASG) of radar experts attached to General Carl Spaatz's headquarters. In the months before D-Day, Trump and Ridenour promoted the modification of SCR-584 radar sets for close air support, using ground radar to guide fighter-bombers onto targets through cloud cover. After a successful demonstration for 9th Air Force officers in May 1944, BBRL supervised the modification program. The branch also prepared the first deployment of Microwave Early Warning (MEW) radar, a long-range system for monitoring aircraft formations and directing fighter operations from the ground.

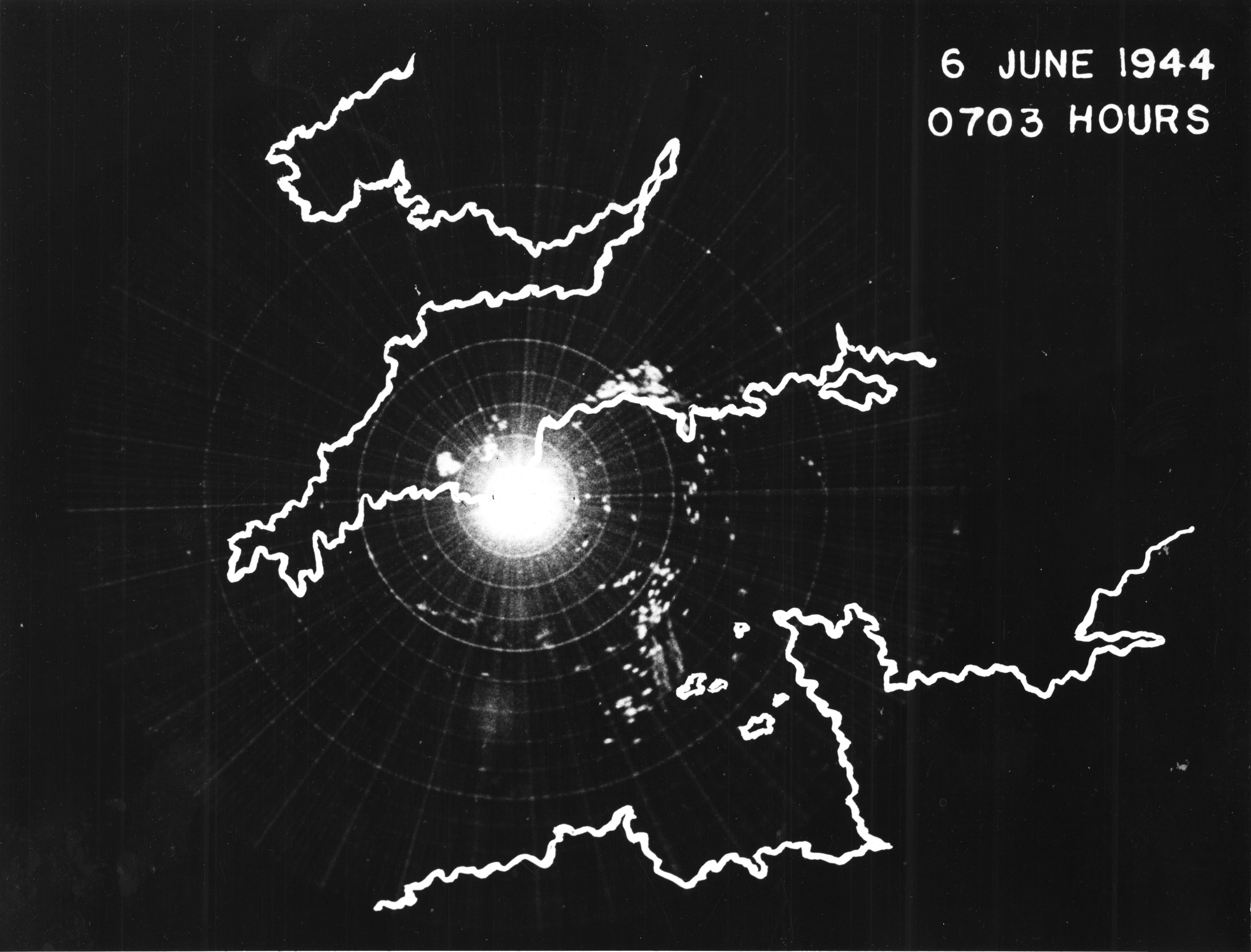
On D-Day, MEW radar installed by BBRL watched and coordinated landings.

On D-Day, the influence of the civilian radar specialists was evident. German coastal radars were jammed and deceived; radar beacons marked the paratroop drop zones behind the beaches; and H_{2}X radar guided the bombing of beachfront fortifications ahead of the assault forces. MEW Radar, activated for the first time on June 6, documented from England the parachute drops and aerial bombings that preceded the troop landings. When Germany began launching V-1 flying bombs against England in the week after the landings, BBRL diverted its long-range radar to detect the rockets offshore. Working alongside gun-laying radar and the proximity fuse, these combined defenses progressively suppressed the V-1 attacks. (Note: Although the SCR-584 proved the most effective countermeasure, the MEW installation at Fairlight, controlled by BBRL, accounted for 131 V-1s shot down by fighters under its direction before the station was closed in late August 1944.) In August 1944, Trump followed Allied forces onto the continent, arriving in Paris on the final day of its liberation, where he established an Advanced Service Base for forward operations.

The ground-controlled close air support technique that Trump championed in Europe proved to be one of the war's important tactical innovations. It enabled Allied air forces to support ground troops even in poor weather, as when radar-guided fighters broke through overcast to repel a German tank attack on Patton's forces in October 1944. In November 1944, he was formally appointed to the Advisory Specialist Group, joining Ridenour as a civilian advisor to General Spaatz on navigational radar, precision bombing, and countermeasures. Trump's dual role in the BBRL and the specialist group integrated two organizations that had previously operated in parallel.

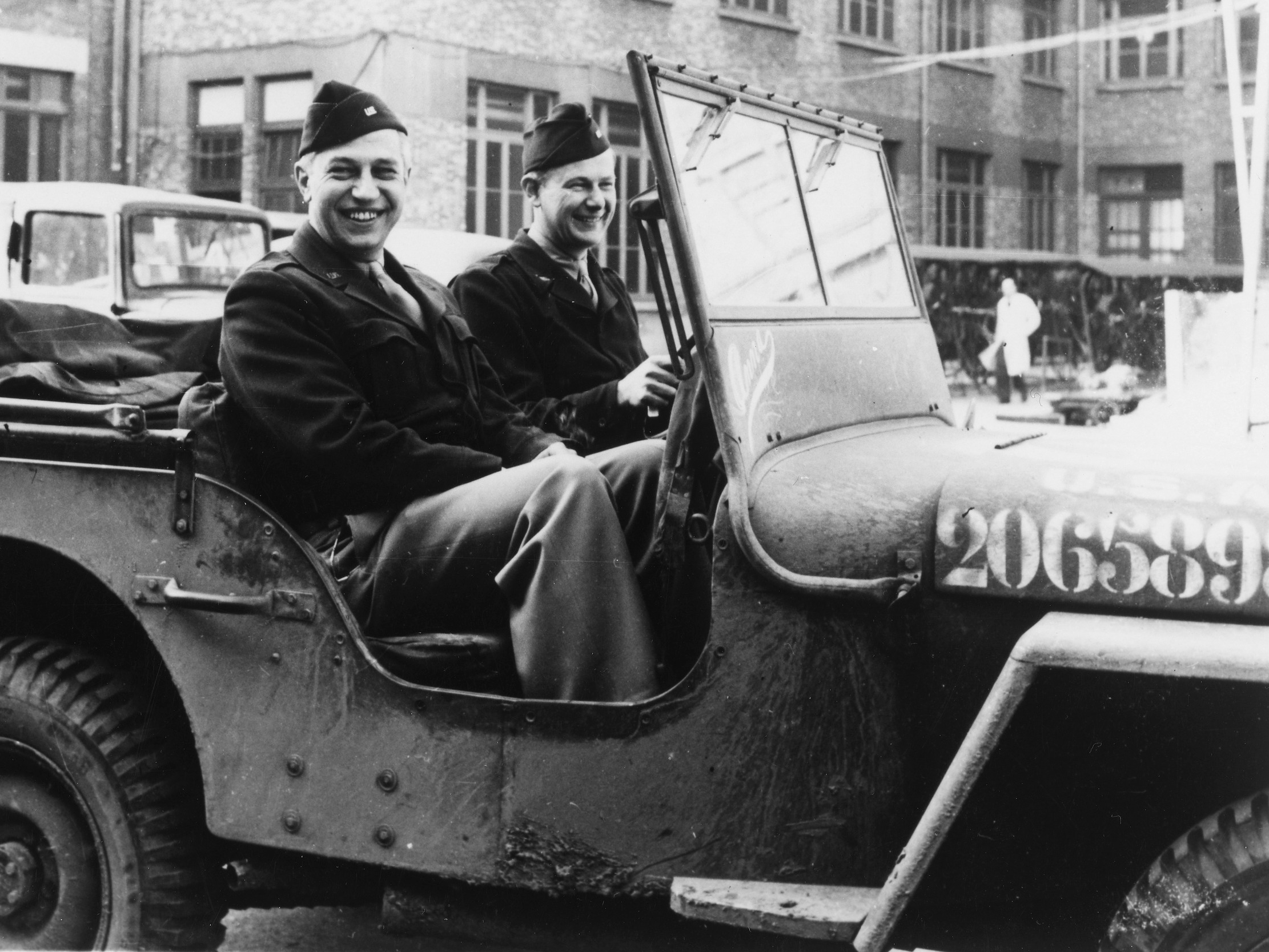
Trump at the Advanced Service Base in Paris with Lee DuBridge, April 1945

Science historian Henry Guerlac described Trump as "one of the most respected and influential scientific figures in the entire theater," crediting his effectiveness to "personal ability, reliable judgment, quiet charm, and great patience." (Note: Quoting Trump's war diary, Kevles notes that Trump kept BBRL working even through British holidays, "partly because of my feeling that holidays are immoral, at least for Americans.") General Spaatz echoed this assessment in a letter to General Arnold, calling BBRL "one of the most important factors contributing to our success" and requesting the organization be augmented rather than reduced.

During his final weeks in Europe, Trump conducted debriefing interviews with the leadership of Telefunken, the company that had developed Nazi Germany's radar. He learned that German radar development had fallen substantially behind, and attributed this to a lack of cooperation with scientists. Nazi industrialists did not work closely with physicists, and scientists were barred from accompanying equipment into combat.

Returning to MIT in April 1945, Trump was appointed assistant director of the Rad Lab and organized a new Field Service division to reproduce the BBRL model in the Pacific. He helped arrange a field radar operation in Manila at General MacArthur's request, but the effort ended with Japan's surrender.

Trump received recognition for his war service from both the United States and the United Kingdom. In 1947, King George VI awarded Trump the Medal for Service in the Cause of Freedom for his radar work and cooperation with Britain. A year later, President Truman awarded Trump the President's Certificate of Merit, given to 250 civilian scientists who "performed a meritorious act or service" during the war.

== Post-war career ==
After the war, Trump returned to his prior research in improving high-voltage generators, treating cancer, and began pursuing new applications of the artificial radiation. He pursued these both through research at MIT and a new company he organized, the High Voltage Engineering Corporation.

=== MIT cancer research ===
Trump returned to his earlier research and was appointed director of High Voltage Research Laboratory, a lab pursuing the improvement and application of electrostatic energy. Until 1965, the lab occupied a vehicle garage vacated by the Rad Lab. Building upon his pre-war collaboration with hospitals, Trump focused on applying high-voltage engineering to medical challenges, particularly cancer treatment.

Months after the war ended, Trump began work with his Huntington colleagues to treat cancer patients at a new clinic building on MIT's campus. Having discovered a way to reach deep-seated tumors without harming tissues above them, he worked on methods to improve targeting. Trump designed an apparatus to rotate the patient around the beam, allowing x-rays to be cross-fired at the tumor site while sparing sensitive organs. The lab's radiologists and medical physicists worked to improve "rotational radiation therapy" over the next twenty-five years.

In 1949, Trump began a two-decade collaboration with the Lahey Clinic, Boston's largest cancer hospital. MIT built a campus cancer treatment facility (Building 28) around a Van de Graaff accelerator of Trump's design. Over the next 22 years, over 500 cancer patients a year received treatment at MIT using Trump's x-ray generator. For many years, he taught radiation physics courses to early-career radiologists. The lab also focused on skin cancer treatment, designing a 5-MV electron-beam generator for targeting superficial lesions.

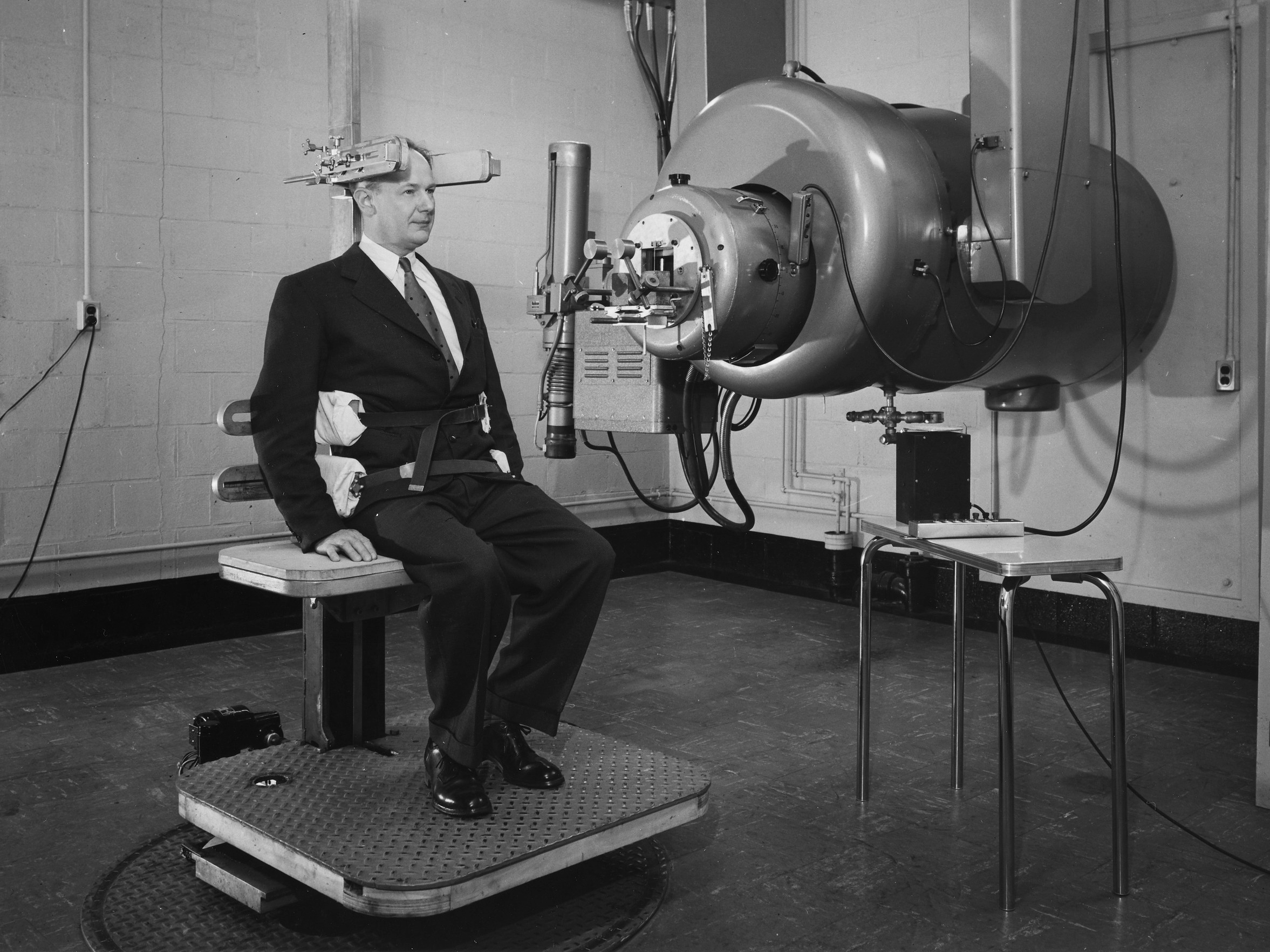
Trump demonstrating rotational therapy with an HVEC machine

Despite advances in supervoltage (>1MeV) generators, few hospitals had machinery to allow high-voltage cancer treatment by the 1940s. After receiving many requests from hospitals for his generator, Trump oversaw a commercialization effort to meet demand. He designed a compact, low-cost 2-MV Van de Graaff generator, then founded a firm to build them. Between 1948 and 1969, the High Voltage Engineering Corporation manufactured 43 of these 2-MV machines, which treated as many as 1,000 patients a day in the United States alone.

By the time Trump was appointed full professor in 1952, his cancer treatment devices had received worldwide attention. He attracted support from the National Institutes of Health and the National Science Foundation, each of which were building cancer research programs. His 1960 Lamme Medal citation, given for contributions to electrical engineering, observed that Trump had also "remain[ed] faithful to his original goals in the treatment of malignant diseases." In 1963, Trump was appointed to the board of the Lahey Clinic, and became its chair after retiring his professorship in 1973. Throughout this period, he published widely in radiology and scientific instrument journals.

=== High Voltage Engineering Corporation ===
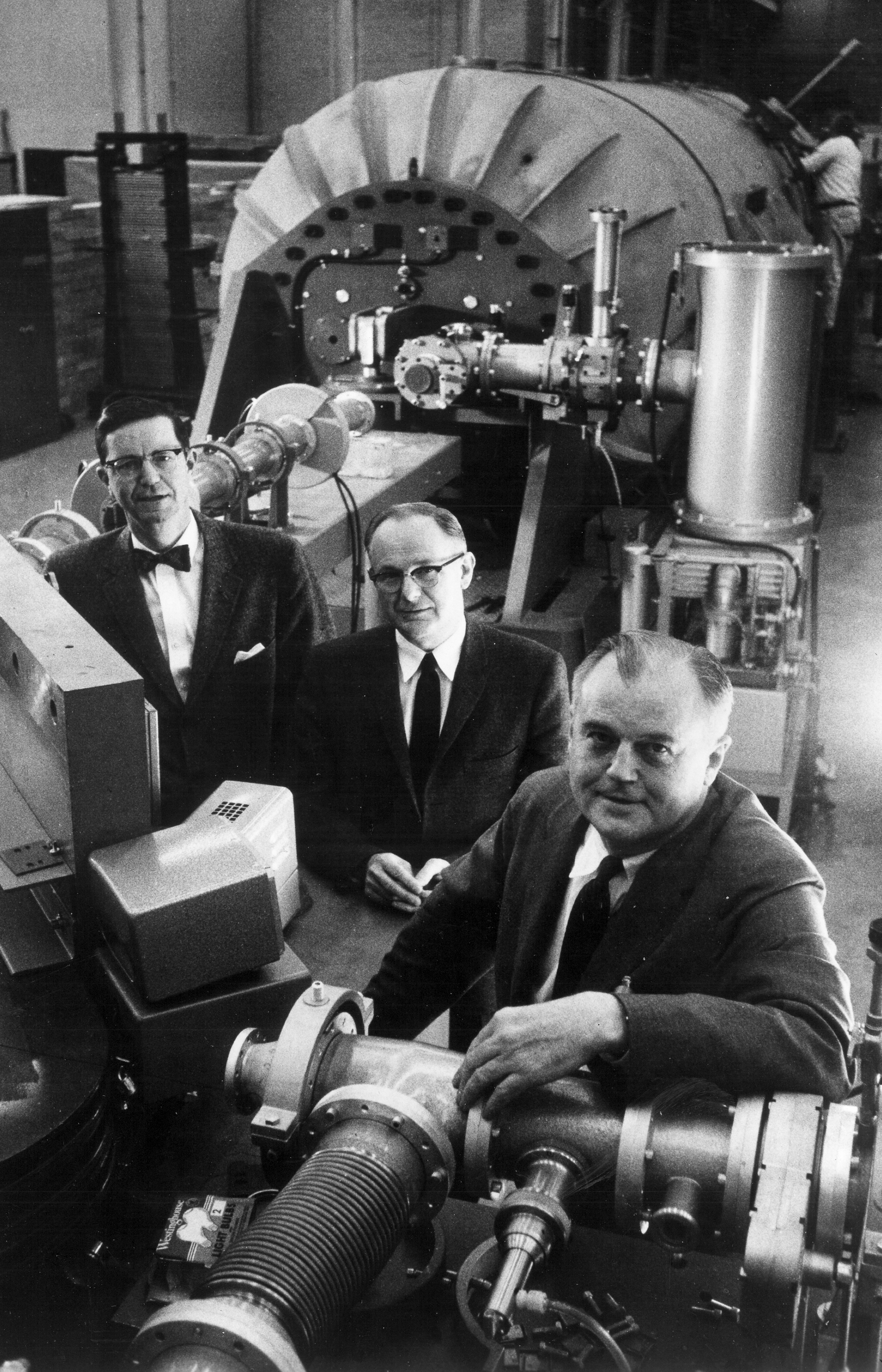
Robinson, Trump, and Van de Graaff (left to right), HVEC founders

In 1946, Trump received more hospital inquiries about his Van de Graaff generators and decided a company could better meet demand. He approached MIT President Karl Compton, who had recently co-founded the American Research and Development Corporation (ARD), the first modern venture capital fund. Compton introduced Trump to ARD president Georges Doriot. Trump organized High Voltage Engineering Corporation (HVEC) with Van de Graaff and British physicist Denis M. Robinson as co-founders, whom he had met through wartime radar work.

HVEC was one of ARD's first three investments, two of which were new firms. (Note: On December 31, 1946, ARD approved equity investments in HVEC and Tracerlab, and supplied credit to fund new products at an existing Cleveland conglomerate, Circo Products.) Doriot provided $200,000 in initial capital, Compton arranged an exclusive license to MIT's Van de Graaff patents, and both served on HVEC's board. Trump served as HVEC's founding chairman and technical director while maintaining his MIT professorship. (Note: Like his two co-founders, Trump received a 13.3 percent stake in the firm.)

Trump's motivations—making radiation therapy affordable to patients and accessible to hospitals—set the company's initial priorities. HVEC's first product was a commercial version of Trump's compact 2 MV generator, which could be operated by hospital technicians. It provided controllable, directed radiation that reduced damage to healthy tissue compared to traditional radium sources. Between 1948 and 1969, HVEC delivered these machines to 35 U.S. hospitals and eight hospitals abroad.

Trump's MIT lab also maintained close ties with HVEC. The High Voltage Research Laboratory provided technical feedback, developed clinical procedures, and tested prototypes for the company. While HVEC's Van de Graaff accelerators were early market leaders in radiotherapy, cheaper cobalt-60 machines and higher-voltage medical linear accelerators debuted in the 1950s, displacing HVEC's Van de Graaff accelerators as the preferred source for radiotherapy. (Note: A 1968 survey of radiotherapy sources showed that linear accelerators had established market dominance. Indirectly, HVEC Van de Graaff accelerators also influenced this next wave of radiotherapy devices. Ed Ginzton, who built the first medical linear accelerator in 1956, assembled it inside the housing of an HVEC 2-MV model and borrowed its rotational setup.)

As federal funding for nuclear physics expanded, HVEC pivoted from medical devices to large research accelerators for universities and national laboratories. Trump and Van de Graaff contributed technical innovations that enabled higher-voltage machines. Between 1958 and 1973, HVEC manufactured 55 tandem accelerators that became the dominant platform for nuclear physics experiments. At its peak, nearly 70 percent of papers in experimental nuclear physics relied on data from HVEC accelerators.

At the time of its 1963 public offering, HVEC was ARD's largest asset and the first company it introduced to public markets. Along with Ionics, it established ARD's focus on research-intensive ventures. This approach anticipated ARD's later investment in Digital Equipment Corporation, considered the first "home run" of venture capital industry.

HVEC invested heavily in higher-energy accelerators with the potential to fuse superheavy elements. When federal support for nuclear physics retreated in 1969, its research accelerator business collapsed. Trump exited his position as chairman in 1970, but continued providing technical advice over the next decade. The company reorganized as a conglomerate focused on industrial radiation processing products. Under a new business model, Trump championed industrial and environmental uses of electron beam technology. In 1962, he encouraged the company to invest in new industrial applications of ionizing radiation. In the late 1970s, he led research into electron beam treatment of wastewater and sewage sludge, demonstrating that high-energy radiation could eliminate pathogens and organic contaminants. In 1980, HVEC received contracts from Miami-Dade County and the Massachusetts Metropolitan District Commission to develop commercial-scale water treatment systems.

HVEC was privately purchased in 1988 and filed for bankruptcy in 2005. Trump held HVEC shares until his death in 1985.

=== Wastewater experiments ===
In 1972, Congress passed new Clean Water Act standards for secondary treatment of wastewater discharged into oceans and waterways. New rules gave cities five years to make major upgrades to sewage treatment. Trump, who had longstanding interests in sterilization methods, initiated a new program at MIT concentrated on disinfecting wastewater. He researched using an electron beam from a 2-MeV accelerator as the deactivating agent in the treatment of municipal wastewater sludge. The High Voltage Research Laboratory developed a prototype system that was tested at Boston's Deer Island Waste Water Treatment Plant, and it was able to provide bacterial and viral disinfection via continuous on-line treatment.

Trump retired from his faculty appointment in 1973, but continued running wastewater experiments and teaching MIT students as a senior lecturer. He directed the High Voltage Research Laboratory until stepping down in 1980. Trump remained engaged in wastewater research until the year of his death.

Trump died in Cambridge, Massachusetts, on February 21, 1985.

=== Science education ===
Trump became a trustee of the Boston Museum of Science in 1961. When the museum installed the original Van de Graaff generator as a permanent exhibition, he oversaw the design of electrostatic shielding that allowed live audience demonstrations. He became a life trustee of the museum.

== Legacy ==
President Ronald Reagan awarded Trump the National Medal of Science in 1983 for his innovative applications of radiation in medicine, industry and atomic physics. Trump died six days before the White House ceremony in February 1985, and his son John, Jr. accepted the medal on his behalf. In a posthumous tribute, the National Academy of Engineering described John Trump as "a pioneer in the scientific, engineering and medical applications of high voltage machinery."

In addition to his cancer research, Trump made institutional contributions to the Lahey Clinic. While chair of its board, he advocated for the relocation of the cancer clinic to a new hospital campus in Burlington, Massachusetts. The radiation oncology building of the Lahey Hospital & Medical Center is named for Trump. In 2024, one of his scientific collaborators endowed a fund at Lahey for diagnostic radiation named for Trump.

=== Disputed claims about career ===
==== Refusal to work on weaponry ====
James Melcher, Trump's successor as HVRL director, falsely claimed that Trump declined to research military weaponry during his career. Melcher, an advocate for nuclear disarmament, stated: "John, over a period of three decades, would be approached by people of all sorts because he could make megavolt beams of ions and electrons – death rays... What did he do with it? Cancer research, sterilizing sludge out in Deer Island, all sorts of wondrous things. He didn't touch the weapons stuff." However, alongside his work in cancer research and sludge sterilization, Trump did work under military contracts for dual uses of microwave radar and high-voltage generators.

==== Longest-serving MIT professor ====
President Donald Trump has repeatedly claimed his uncle was MIT's "longest serving professor." John Trump served as an MIT professor for 37 years (1936–1973), ending his faculty appointment at the university's then-mandatory retirement age of 65. His career at MIT spanned 51 years, including research staff and senior lecturer appointments before and after his professorship. According to Newsweek, other MIT professors have had longer tenures: Harold Edgerton remained active at MIT for nearly 62 years (1927–1989), and Gilbert Strang served as professor for 61 years. (Note: Strang's tenure extends after Congress prohibited mandatory faculty retirement in 1986.)

==== Alleged connections to the Unabomber ====
At a July 2025 political rally, President Trump asserted that domestic terrorist Ted Kaczynski was Professor Trump's student. He described asking his uncle about Kaczynski's performance as a student. Because the reclusive Kaczynski was identified as the Unabomber in 1996, nine years after John Trump's death, multiple media outlets concluded it was unlikely President Trump knew the Unabomber's identity during his uncle's lifetime. Kaczynski was a student at Harvard University (1959–62) and the University of Michigan (1962–67); MIT officials told CNN they have no records of Kaczynski's enrollment in MIT courses.

== Personal life ==
John G. Trump was a member of the Trump family.

In 1935, he married Elora Sauerbrun (1913–1983), a fellow native of New York's Jamaica neighborhood. The Trumps had three children: John Gordon Trump (1938–2012) of Watertown, Massachusetts; Christine Philp (1942–2021) of New London, New Hampshire; and Karen Ingraham of Los Alamos, New Mexico; and six grandchildren.

The Trumps lived in Winchester, Massachusetts, and were members of the Winchester Unitarian Society.

== Awards and honors ==
Trump received a number of awards including:

- 1947: The King's Medal for Service in the Cause of Freedom (KMS), given by George VI
- 1948: The President's Certificate of Merit, given by Harry S. Truman
- 1950: Fellow of the American Academy of Arts & Sciences
- 1960: The Lamme Medal, given by the American Institute of Electrical Engineers
- 1973: IEEE Power Engineering Society Power Life Award
- 1982: American College of Radiology Gold Medal
- 1983: The National Medal of Science for Engineering Sciences

== Patents ==
High Voltage Ionic Discharge Device (1939)

== Selected publications ==
Trump wrote about 100 peer-reviewed articles, published across journals in applied physics, nuclear science, radiology and medicine, scientific instruments, and environmental engineering.

=== Dissertation ===
- Trump, John G. (1933). Vacuum electrostatic engineering (Sc.D thesis). Massachusetts Institute of Technology Department of Electrical Engineering. hdl:1721.1/32556.

=== Journal articles ===
- — —, Merrill, F.H.; Safford, F.J. (December 1938). "Van de Graaff generator for general laboratory use". Review of Scientific Instruments. 9 (12): 398–403. Bibcode:1938RScI....9..398T. doi:10.1063/1.1752376.
- – – with Andrias, James (1941). "High-voltage D-C Flashover of Solid Insulators in Compressed Nitrogen". Electrical Engineering. 60 (11): 986–989. Bibcode:1941ElEng..60..986T. doi:10.1109/EE.1941.6434541.
- – – (1947). "Electrostatic Sources of Electric Power". Electrical Engineering. 66 (6): 525–534. Bibcode:1947ElEng..66..525T. doi:10.1109/EE.1947.6443559.
- – – with Van de Graaff, Robert J. (1947). "The Insulation of High Voltages in Vacuum". Journal of Applied Physics. 18 (3): 327–332. Bibcode:1947JAP....18..327T. doi:10.1063/1.1697654.
- Schumb, Walter C.; Trump, John G.; Priest, Grace L. (1949). "Effect of High Voltage Electrical Discharges on Sulfur Hexafluoride". Industrial & Engineering Chemistry. 41 (7): 1348–1349. doi:10.1021/ie50475a012.
- — —, Wright, K.A.; Evans, W.W.; Anson, J.H.; Hare, H.F.; Fromer, J.L.; Jacque, G.; Horne, K.W. (1953). "High Energy Electrons for the Treatment of Extensive Superficial Malignant Lesions". American Journal of Roentgenology. 69 (4): 623–629. PMID 13030918.
- Cloud, Robert W.; Beckman, Lars; Trump, John G. (1957). "Barium Absorption Pumps for High-Vacuum Systems". Review of Scientific Instruments. 28 (11): 889–892. Bibcode:1957RScI...28..889C. doi:10.1063/1.1715756.
- Wright, Kenneth A.; Trump, John G. (1962). "Back-Scattering of Megavolt Electrons from Thick Targets". Journal of Applied Physics. 33 (2): 687–690. Bibcode:1962JAP....33..687W. doi:10.1063/1.1702488.
- Diessner, Armin; Trump, John G. (1970). "Free Conducting Particles in a Coaxial Compressed-Gas-Insulated System". Journal of Applied Physics. 89 (8): 1970–1978. Bibcode:1970ITPAS..89.1970D. doi:10.1109/TPAS.1970.292781.
- — — Merrill, E.W.; Wright, K.A. (1984). "Disinfection of Sewage Wastewater and Sludge by Electron Treatment". Radiation Physics and Chemistry. 24 (1): 55–66. Bibcode:1984RaPC...24...55T. doi:10.1016/0146-5724(84)90007-4.

=== Essays ===
- Trump, John G. (December 1947). "Roentgen Rays against Cancer". The Technology Review. Vol. 50, no. 12. pp. 91–95 – via Internet Archive.
- —— (1960). "Supervoltage Radiation Therapy in the Next Decade". Surgical Clinics of North America. 40 (3): 839–848. doi:10.1016/S0039-6109(16)36109-6. PMID 13839571.
- —— (1967). "New Developments in High Voltage Technology". IEEE Transactions on Nuclear Science. 14 (3): 113–121. Bibcode:1967ITNS...14..113T. doi:10.1109/TNS.1967.4324534.
- —— (1971). "Energized Electrons Tackle Municipal Sludge". American Scientist. Vol. 69, no. 3. pp. 276–284. JSTOR 27850426.
- Goldie, Charles H.; —— (November 1974). "Van de Graaff accelerators of the future". Nuclear Instruments and Methods. 122: 277–285. Bibcode:1974NucIM.122..277G. doi:10.1016/0029-554x(74)90488-1.
- —— (1978). "Disinfection of Municipal Sludge by High-Energy Electrons". Pollution Engineering. Vol. 10, no. 9. pp. 49–51.

=== Reports ===
- Trump, John G.; Wright, Kenneth A. (July 1953). Sterilization of Blood Plasma and Fractions with High Energy Electrons. Progress Report to National Institutes of Health (Report). U. S. Public Health Service.
- High Energy Electron Radiation of Wastewater Liquid Residuals: A Report to the National Science Foundation (PDF) (Report). Cambridge, MA: Massachusetts Institute of Technology. 1977. OCLC 30710419 – via IAEA.

=== Manuscripts ===
- A War Diary, 1944-5 (1973)
