= Teleforce =

Proposed defensive weapon by Nikola Tesla

Teleforce is a defensive weapon proposed by Nikola Tesla that accelerated pellets or slugs of material to a high velocity inside a vacuum chamber via electrostatic repulsion and then fired them out of aimed nozzles at intended targets. Tesla claimed to have conceived of it after studying the Van de Graaff generator. Tesla described the weapon as being able to be used against ground-based infantry or for anti-aircraft purposes.

== Description ==
Tesla described Teleforce's operation in 1934, specifying its superiority to the death rays believed to exist at the time:

My apparatus projects particles which may be relatively large or of microscopic dimensions, enabling us to convey to a small area at a great distance trillions of times more energy than is possible with rays of any kind. Many thousands of horsepower can thus be transmitted by a stream thinner than a hair, so that nothing can resist. The nozzle would send concentrated beams of particles through the free air, of such tremendous energy that they will bring down a fleet of 10,000 enemy airplanes at a distance of 200 miles from a defending nation's border and will cause armies to drop dead in their tracks.

In a letter that was written to J. P. Morgan, Jr. on November 29, 1934, Tesla described the weapon:

I have made recent discoveries of inestimable value... The flying machine has completely demoralized the world, so much that in some cities, as London and Paris, people are in mortal fear from aerial bombing. The new means I have perfected afford absolute protection against this and other forms of attack. ... These new discoveries, which I have carried out experimentally on a limited scale, have created a profound impression. One of the most pressing problems seems to be the protection of London and I am writing to some influential friends in England hoping that my plan will be adopted without delay. The Russians are very anxious to render their borders safe against Japanese invasion and I have made them a proposal which is being seriously considered.

In 1937, Tesla wrote a treatise, "The Art of Projecting Concentrated Non-dispersive Energy through the Natural Media", concerning charged particle beam weapons. Tesla published the document in an attempt to expound on the technical description of a 'superweapon" that would put an end to all war." This treatise is currently in the Nikola Tesla Museum archive in Belgrade. It describes an open-ended vacuum tube with a gas jet seal that allows particles to exit, a method of charging particles to millions of volts, and a method of creating and directing non-dispersive particle streams (through electrostatic repulsion).

== "Death ray" misnomer ==
Teleforce was mentioned publicly in the New York Sun and The New York Times on July 11, 1934. The press called it a "peace ray" or death ray. The idea of a "death ray" was a misunderstanding in regard to Tesla's term when he referred to his invention as a "death beam" so Tesla went on to explain that "this invention of mine does not contemplate the use of any so-called 'death rays.' Rays are not applicable because they cannot be produced in requisite quantities and diminish rapidly in intensity with distance. All the energy of New York City (approximately two million horsepower) transformed into rays and projected twenty miles, could not kill a human being, because, according to a well known law of physics, it would disperse to such an extent as to be ineffectual. My apparatus projects particles ..."

What set Tesla's proposal apart from the usual run of fantasy "death rays" was a unique vacuum chamber with one end open to the atmosphere. Tesla devised a unique vacuum seal by directing a high-velocity air stream at the tip of his gun to maintain "high vacua". The necessary pumping action would be accomplished with a large Tesla turbine.

== Components ==
In total, the components and methods included:

- An apparatus for producing manifestations of energy in free air instead of in a high vacuum as in the past.
- A mechanism for generating tremendous electrical force.
- A means of intensifying and amplifying the force developed by the second mechanism.
- A new method for producing a tremendous electrical repelling force. This would be the projector, or gun, of the invention.

It has been said that the charged particles would self-focus via "gas focusing,". In 1940, Tesla estimated that each station would cost no more than $2,000,000 and could have been constructed in a few months.

After Tesla died, in a box purported to contain a part of Tesla's "death ray" apparatus, John G. Trump found a 45-year-old multidecade resistance box.

== Attempts at development and marketing ==
By November 1934, Tesla was attempting to obtain funding from J. P. Morgan's son, Jack Morgan (unsuccessfully). The idea of Tesla possibly having a new type of weapon and, further, his offer to give it to the League of Nations as a way to prevent future war were seen together as an alarming security threat by one US diplomat – a view not shared by his government. In 1935, the Soviet Union, through the US Amtorg Trading Corporation, an alleged Soviet-arms front in New York City, paid Tesla $25,000 for detailed plans, specifications, and complete information on the method and apparatus, but it is unclear whether a physical device was ever produced. Tesla also attempted to get funding for his device in 1937, sending a paper ("New Art of Projecting Concentrated Non-Dispersive Energy Through Natural Media") outlining his plans to the governments of the United States, the United Kingdom, France, Canada, and Yugoslavia. The United Kingdom considered Tesla's offer to sell the device to them for $30 million, maybe with the idea that even hinting they had a super weapon would be a deterrent to Adolf Hitler, but by 1938 they had dropped all interest.

During this period, Tesla claimed that efforts had been made to steal the invention, saying that his room had been entered and that his papers had been scrutinized, but that the thieves or spies had left empty-handed. He said that there was no danger that his invention could be stolen, for he had at no time committed any part of it to paper; the blueprint for the Teleforce weapon was all in his mind.

At his birthday press conference in 1937, Tesla was asked about his weapon, and he made the claim, "But it is not an experiment... I have built, demonstrated and used it. Only a little time will pass before I can give it to the world." At the 1940 birthday press conference, 84-year-old Tesla offered to develop his weapon for the US, but there was no interest in his offer.

== See also ==
- Coilgun
- Railgun
