= Joseph M. Pettit =

American academic administrator (1916–1986)

Joseph Mayo Pettit
- Born: July 15, 1916; Rochester, Minnesota, United States
- Died: September 15, 1986 (aged 70); Atlanta, Georgia, United States
- Education: University of California, Berkeley; Stanford University
- Awards: President's Certificate of Merit (1949); IEEE Founders Medal (1983)
- Scientific career
- Fields: Electronic Engineering
- Workplaces: Stanford University; Georgia Institute of Technology
- Doctoral students: Donald Pederson

Joseph Mayo Pettit (July 15, 1916 – September 15, 1986) was an engineer and the president of the Georgia Institute of Technology from 1972 to 1986. He previously served as the dean of the Stanford University School of Engineering from 1958 to 1972.

While president of Georgia Tech, Pettit advanced the causes of research and industrial development at the school.

== Early life and career ==
Joseph M. Pettit was born in Rochester, Minnesota. He earned a B.S. degree from the University of California, Berkeley, in 1938, an engineering degree from Stanford University in 1940, and a Ph.D. from Stanford in 1942.

From 1940 to 1942, Pettit served as an instructor at the University of California. He then joined the World War II radar countermeasures project at the Radio Research Laboratory of Harvard University. Following the war effort, Pettit became supervising engineer with Airborne Instruments Laboratory in New York.

In 1947, Pettit joined the faculty of Stanford University, and was named Professor of Electrical Engineering in 1954. He was named Dean of the Stanford School of Engineering in 1958, and would remain in the position until 1972.

== Georgia Tech ==
Pettit became president of the Georgia Institute of Technology in 1972. During his 14-year tenure as president, Pettit was credited with turning Georgia Tech into a top tier research institution. Pettit has also received credit for shifting Georgia Tech back to its roots with regard to providing assistance with economic development within the state of Georgia. In the decades known for the Vietnam War and the launch of Sputnik, research at Georgia Tech and the Georgia Tech Research Institute had become so tied with NASA and the Department of Defense that local industrial development had been largely forgotten. In 1975, the Georgia General Assembly designated the Engineering Experiment Station (now the Georgia Tech Research Institute) as the "Georgia Productivity Center". Georgia was the first state to designate such a center to encourage business productivity.

In the aftermath of the launch of Scientific Atlanta by Glen P. Robinson and the subsequent disputes, Georgia Tech's culture encouraged hard work, but did not encourage start-ups. This changed during Joseph Pettit's administration; Pettit was at Stanford during the development of Silicon Valley and worked to change the culture to inspire something similar in Atlanta. "That was when Tech began actively encouraging faculty, staff and students to be entrepreneurial... In some ways it was a shift back to our roots, with Tech beginning to reconnect with the state through the Advanced Technology Development Center, the Economic Development Institute and the Georgia Research Alliance", according to Bob McMath.

During Pettit's tenure as Georgia Tech's president, the Institute progressed into top tier of technological education institutions. Under his leadership, Tech's research budget surpassed the $100 million mark for the first time in its history. In addition, Pettit spearheaded Tech's historic $100 million Centennial Campaign. Pettit worked closely with J. Erskine Love, Jr. with regard to these fundraising efforts; Love was later asked to deliver the eulogy at Pettit's funeral.

Numerous research centers were established during Pettit's tenure at Georgia Tech. In 1978, Georgia Tech established the Georgia Mining Resources Institute, which was linked to the U. S. Bureau of Mines; they also established the Fracture and Fatigue Research Laboratory. Other centers established around this time included the Computational Mechanics Center in 1979; the Center for Rehabilitation Technology in 1980; the Advance Technology Center, the Technology Policy and Assessment Center, and the Microelectronics Research Center in 1981; the Materials Handling Research Center, Center for Architecture Conservation, Center for Excellence in Rotary Wing Aircraft, and Communication Research Center in 1982; the Research Center for Biotechnology in 1983; and the Center for the Enhancement of Teaching and Learning, and the College of Architecture Construction Research Center in 1986. The general assembly granted $15 million in funding for the Center of Excellence in Microelectronics in 1985.

Pettit also oversaw Georgia Tech's application and admittance into the Atlantic Coast Conference (ACC), an athletic league founded in 1953 which included seven charter members. Georgia Tech had withdrawn from the Southeastern Conference in January 1964 and had operated as an Independent until 1975 when Georgia Tech joined the Metro Conference. Georgia Tech was admitted to the ACC on April 3, 1978. The ACC has expanded from 8 to 12 members since that time.

Pettit died of cancer in 1986, and his vice president of academic affairs, Henry C. Bourne, Jr., served as interim president.

== Honors and awards ==
Pettit was awarded the President's Certificate of Merit in 1949 for his contributions during World War II. He was named a Fellow of the Institute of Radio Engineers (now part of IEEE) in 1954 and served on that organization's board of directors from 1954 to 1955. He was elected as a life member of IEEE in 1982. While in IRE and later IEEE, Pettit founded two academic conferences: Wescon in 1949 and Southcon in 1981.

Pettit was also involved in the American Society for Engineering Education, serving two terms on their board of directors and one term, 1972–1973, as their president. He served on the National Science Board from 1977 to 1982, and also served as an advisor to the National Science Foundation.

The Joseph Mayo Pettit Distinguished Service Award, conferred by the Georgia Tech Alumni Association, is named after Pettit.

== See also ==
- History of Georgia Tech#Research expansion
