= Thomas Lux =

American poet (1946–2017)

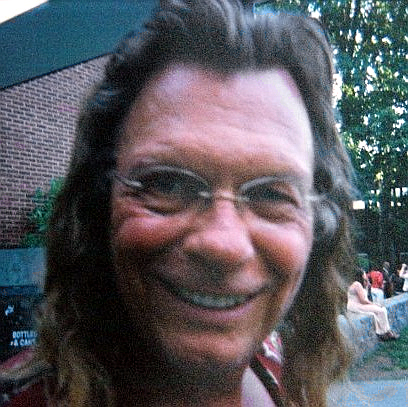
- Born: Thomas Norman Lux; December 10, 1946; Northampton, Massachusetts
- Died: February 5, 2017 (aged 70); Atlanta, Georgia
- Occupations: Poet, Professor
- Writing career
- Notable awards: Kingsley Tufts Poetry Award

Thomas Lux (December 10, 1946 – February 5, 2017) was an American poet who held the Margaret T. and Henry C. Bourne, Jr. Chair in Poetry at the Georgia Institute of Technology and ran Georgia Tech's "Poetry @ Tech" program. He wrote fourteen books of poetry.

== Early life and education ==
Thomas Lux was born in Northampton, Massachusetts, son of a milkman and a Sears & Roebuck switchboard operator, neither of whom graduated from high school. Lux was raised in Massachusetts on a dairy farm.

He graduated from Emerson College in Boston, where he was also poet in residence from 1970 to 1975. His first book—Memory's Handgrenade—was published shortly after.

== Academic career ==
He was a member of the writing faculty at Sarah Lawrence College, where he taught for twenty-seven years, from 1975 until 2001. He was also a core faculty member of the Warren Wilson M.F.A. Program for Writers. In 1996 he was a visiting professor at University of California, Irvine. A former Guggenheim Fellow and three times a recipient of grants from the National Endowment for the Arts, Lux received, in 1995, the $50,000 Kingsley Tufts Poetry Award for his sixth collection, Split Horizons. In 2003, Lux was awarded an honorary doctorate of Letters from Emerson College. His poems were featured in many notable anthologies, including American Alphabets: 25 Contemporary Poets (2006). In 2012, Lux received the Robert Creeley Award.

At the time of his death in February 2017, Lux was the Margaret T. and Henry C. Bourne, Jr. Chair in Poetry at the Georgia Institute of Technology where he began teaching in 2001. At Georgia Tech he ran their "Poetry at Tech" program, which included one of the best known poetry reading series in the country, along with community outreach classes and workshops.

Before his death, Lux edited (and wrote the Introduction to) Bill Knott's posthumous publication I Am Flying into Myself: Selected Poems 1960–2014 which appeared in February 2017.

== Death ==
Lux died of lung cancer at his home in Atlanta, Georgia on February 5, 2017, survived by his wife Jennifer Holley Lux and a daughter from a previous marriage, Claudia Lux.

== Bibliography ==
=== Poetry ===
Collections

- Memory's handgrenade. Cambridge, Mass.: Pym-Randall. 1972.
- The glassblower's breath. Cleveland, Ohio: Cleveland State University Poetry Center. 1976.
- Sunday (1979)
- Half Promised Land (1986)
- The Drowned River (1990)
- Split Horizon (1994)
- The Blind Swimmer: Selected Early Poems, 1970–1975 (1996)
- New and Selected Poems, 1975–1995 (1997)
- The Street of Clocks (2001)
- The Cradle Place (2004)
- God Particles (2008)
- Child Made of Sand (2012)
- Selected Poems (Bloodaxe Books, UK, 2014) ISBN 978-1-78037-115-3
- To the Left of Time, Ecco, 2016

Chapbooks

- The Land Sighted (chapbook, 1970)
- Madrigal on the Way Home (chapbook, 1976)
- Like a Wide Anvil from the Moon the Light (chapbook, 1980)
- Massachusetts (chapbook, 1981)
- Tarantulas on the Lifebuoy (chapbook, 1983)
- A Boat in the Forest (chapbook, 1992)
- Pecked to Death by Swans (chapbook, 1993)

List of poems

Title	Year	First published	Reprinted/collected
Cow chases boys	2015	Lux, Thomas (March 23, 2015). "Cow chases boys". The New Yorker. 91 (5): 46.	
Refrigerator, 1957	2021	Lux, Thomas (September 6, 2021). "Refrigerator, 1957". The New Yorker. 97 (27): 54–55.	
