= Gas focusing =

Gas focusing, also known as ionic focusing.

Rather than being dispersed, a beam of charged particles travelling in an inert gas environment sometimes becomes narrower. This is ascribed to the generation of gas ions which diffuse outwards, neutralizing the particle beam globally, and producing an intense radial electric field which applies a radially inward force to the particles in the beam.

== See also ==
- Vacuum tube
- Teleforce
