= AN/CPS-1 =

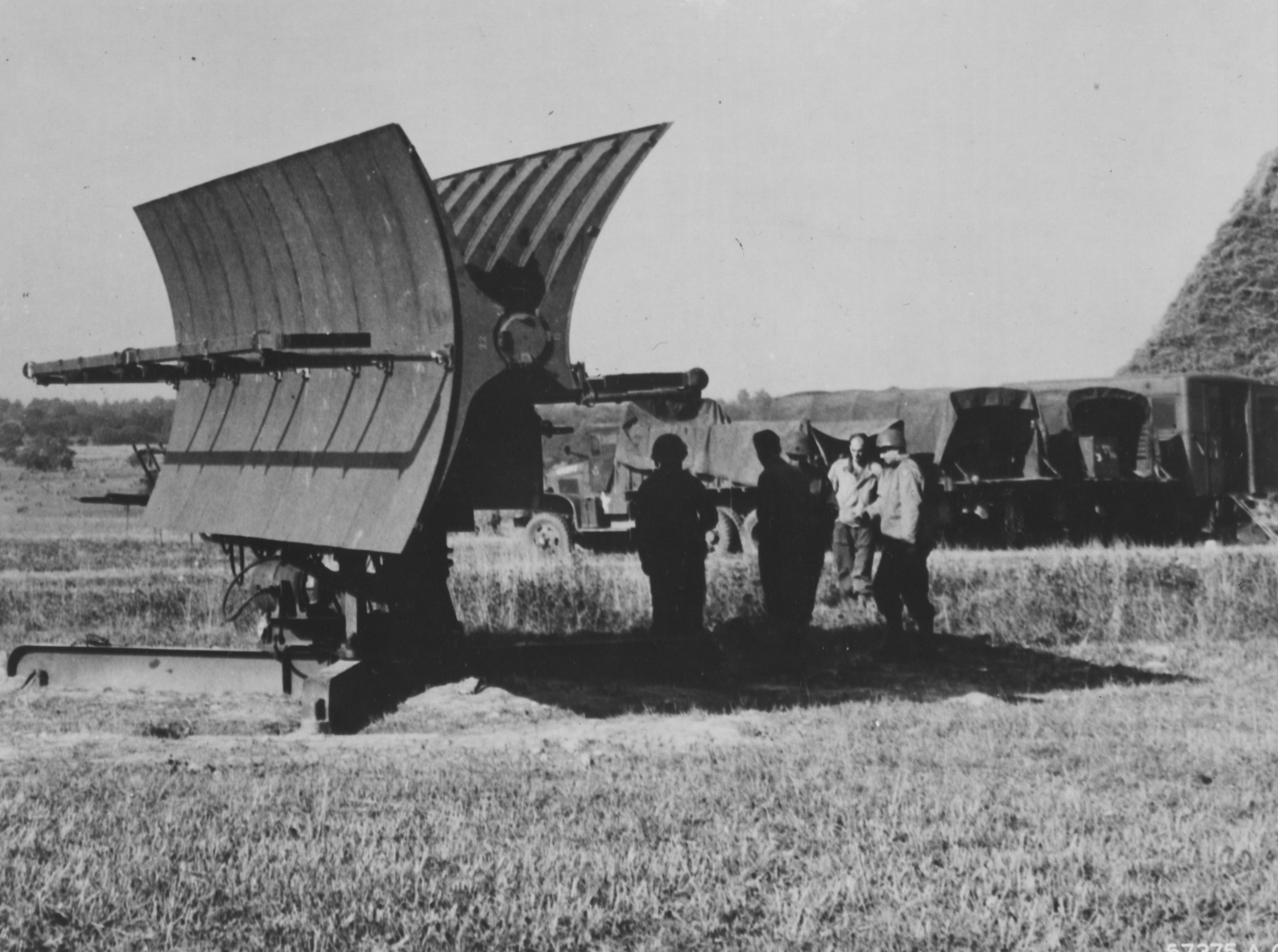
- An AN/CPS-1 (MEW) in the field
- Country of origin: US
- Designer: MIT Radiation Laboratory
- No. built: 6
- Frequency: 3,200 MHz
- Beamwidth: 0.8º
- Pulsewidth: 0.8 microsecond
- RPM: 10 rpm
- Range: 200 miles (320 km)
- Azimuth: 360º
- Other names: Microwave Early Warning, MEW

The AN/CPS-1, also known as the Microwave Early Warning (MEW) radar, was a semi-mobile, S band, early-warning radar developed by the MIT Radiation Laboratory during World War II. It was one of the first projects attempted by the Lab and was intended to build equipment to transition from the British long-wave radar to the new microwave centimeter-band radar made possible by the cavity magnetron. The project was led by Luis Walter Alvarez.

Deployed to the European Theater in 1944, the MEW proved to be an extremely effective radar against German V-1 flying bombs and V-2 rockets. After the war, the AN/CPS-1 was adopted for use by civil aviation becoming the first radar used to track aircraft on civil air routes in the United States.

The designation "CPS" under the JETDS system means “Fixed, Radar, Search” electronic device.

== Background ==
In 1940, Vannevar Bush, head of the National Defense Research Committee, established the "Microwave Committee" (section D-1) and the "Fire Control" division (D-2) to develop a more advanced radar anti-aircraft system in time to assist the British air-defense effort.

In September of that year, a British delegation, the Tizard Mission, travelled to the US and Canada to appraise them on their advances in various fields. Among these was the magnetron, invented earlier that year by John Randall and Harry Boot. In contrast to existing systems like Chain Home that operated in the VHF meter wavelength bands, the magnetron produced a signal at 10 cm wavelength (3 GHz). The resolution of any optical system, including radars, is a function of the aperture and wavelength. By working at shorter wavelengths, the magnetron allowed a radar with a similar resolution to be built with a much smaller antenna.

To take advantage of the new design, Bush organized the Radiation Laboratory (Rad Lab) at the Massachusetts Institute of Technology (MIT) to develop applications using it. Among the early projects were replacements for the SCR-270 gun laying radar and the SCR-527 and SCR-588 medium-range early warning radars. All of these were based on VHF systems like Chain Home, and the possibility of reducing their size while at the same time increasing their accuracy represented a significant advance.

During follow-up meetings on 19 November, Luis Alvarez and Taffy Bowen were talking about the air-to-ground bombing radar concept, which was being developed in the UK as H2S. Alvarez came up with the concept of embedding a waveguide in the leading edge of an aircraft's wing and then using phased array techniques to steer it left and right for scanning the ground. He was given the go-ahead to begin development of the AN/APQ-7 system which saw some use on the Boeing B-29 Superfortress late in the war.

== Design and development ==
In January 1942, Rad Lab members travelled to the UK to see Chain Home and look for any concepts that might be useful in setting up a similar radar network in the US. One of them, Morton Kanner, met with Alvarez after returning to the US. Alvarez suggested using a slotted waveguide in front of a cylindrical reflector, forming a very narrow beam side-to-side while still being relatively wide vertically and thus scanning for aircraft across a wide band of altitudes. Kanner was given the go-ahead to start development in June 1942, and it was eventually given the name AN/CPS-1 under the newly emerging Army/Navy nomenclature. An order was placed for 25 to be delivered in 1943 and another 75 the next year.

The first set was rushed into production and completed in the summer of 1943. The United States Army Signal Corps began testing it at the Army Air Force School of Applied Tactics at the Orlando Army Air Base in Florida. At the same time, an office was established at Camp Evans, New Jersey in order to oversee the project. The initial tests were extremely favorable; the high accuracy of the system allowed it to not only be used for detecting the enemy but it could also "be used for controlling friendly aircraft on bombing, photography and reconnaissance missions, as well as fighters on intercept missions."

== Operational use ==
=== WWII ===
The initial orders proved optimistic, and the first five sets were hand-built at the RadLab as a production line was set up. The first of these five was shipped to England in January 1944, and initially set up in Devonshire to serve as a training site for crews. From its position, it could see across the English Channel into skies above Cotentin Peninsula and on the evening of 5 June 1944 its operators created a time-lapse film of the radar's plan position indicator creating a unique view of the airspace during the Normandy landings.

At the urging of Louis Ridenour the radar was moved in early July to Hastings to improve its ability to track buzz bombs. In this role the system's lack of altitude measurement was not an issue as the bombs always flew low. The CPS-1's ability to scan much closer to the horizon gave it much more range than previous long-range sets like Chain Home Low.

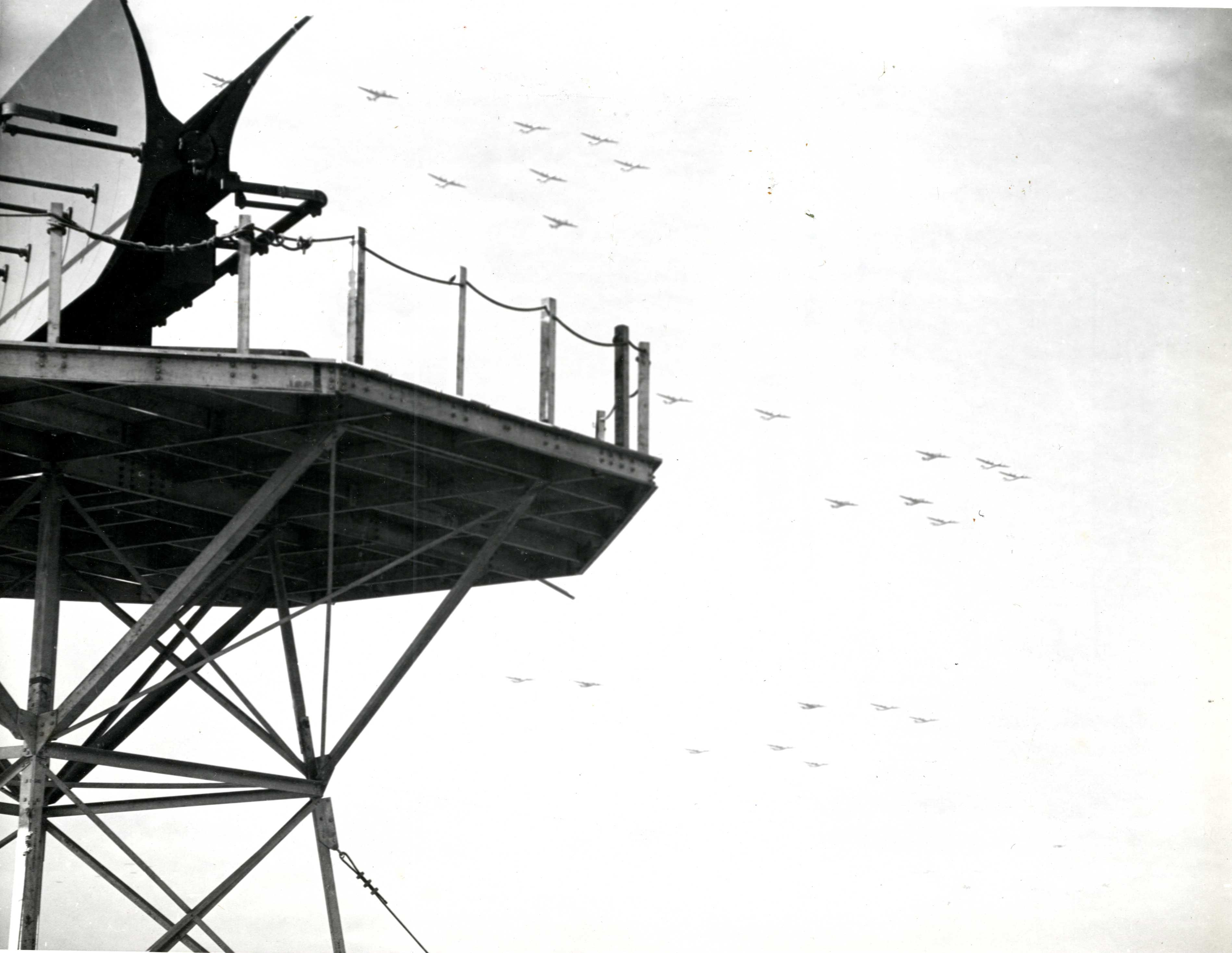
CPS-1 with bombers returning from the Netherlands, Sept. 1944

Another CPS-1 was modified by the Royal Air Force's Telecommunications Research Establishment (TRE) into a semi-mobile form, and was landed on Omaha Beach on 12 June 1944. This system was used primarily for fighter control and ground-controlled interception. In this role, the lack of altitude measurement was an issue, which was remedied by pairing it with AMES Type 13 height-finding radars, and in US use, AN/APS-10. The radar proved very effective against low-flying German aircraft attempting to infiltrate behind Allied lines.

Another CPS-1 was sent to Saipan on 21 September 1944, but was not immediately put into use. Here, the air traffic was much lower and the existing VHF sets were seen as good enough. When Japanese aircraft began making surprise low-level attacks on the base the VHF sets proved not to be able to detect them. The CPS-1 was moved to the top of Mount Tapochau by New Year's 1945. On 3 January, this set detected another raid at 200 kilometres (120 mi) range, which was intercepted. It also found a secondary role in searching for allied aircraft that crashed in the ocean, where its high accuracy allowed the locations to be pinpointed.

=== Post-War uses ===
MEWs were deployed to South Korea after the war. In early 1948, American radar crews utilizing the MEW tracked Soviet Air Forces MIGs over North Korea.

== See also ==
- List of radars
- List of military electronics of the United States
