= Edward L. Bowles =

American electrical engineer (1897–1990)

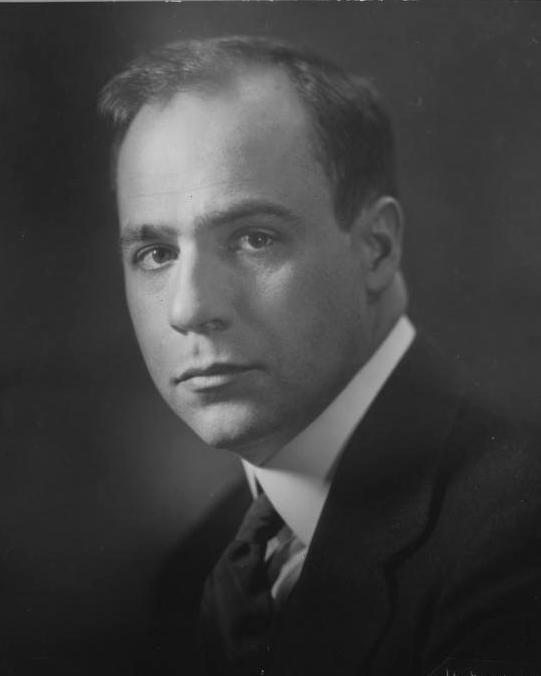
- Bowles at MIT, before 1930
- Born: December 9, 1897; Westphalia, Missouri, U.S.
- Died: September 5, 1990 (aged 92); Weston, Massachusetts, U.S.
- Education: Washington University in St. Louis (BS); Massachusetts Institute of Technology (MS)
- Known for: Radar development, RAND Corporation founding
- Spouse: Lois Wuerpel (m. 1922)
- Awards: Distinguished Service Medal (1945); Medal for Merit (1948); Honorary CBE (1948)

Edward Lindley Bowles (December 9, 1897 – September 5, 1990) was an American electrical engineer. An MIT professor, he played a central role in the development and military application of radar during World War II. As expert consultant to Secretary of War Henry L. Stimson and communications consultant to the Army Air Forces, he helped translate laboratory technologies into operational weapons systems, particularly in the campaign against German U-boats in the Battle of the Atlantic.

Before the war, Bowles built the communications engineering program at the Massachusetts Institute of Technology and directed the Round Hill Research Station, where he pioneered interdisciplinary research on radio propagation, fog detection, and aircraft instrument landing systems. After the war, he was among the founders of the RAND Corporation and continued as a defense consultant and corporate director. His career exemplified the new relationship between academic science, military planning, and industrial research that emerged in mid-twentieth-century America.

== Early life and education ==
Bowles was born on December 9, 1897, in Westphalia, Missouri, where his father practiced medicine. He served briefly in the United States Army in 1918, stationed at Camp Zachary Taylor and Fort Sheridan. He earned a bachelor's degree in electrical engineering from Washington University in St. Louis in 1920.

That fall, Bowles enrolled at MIT for graduate study, intending to stay only a year before entering industry. He found much of the electrical engineering faculty uninspiring; as he later recalled, most had "retired mentally." He supplemented his coursework by taking classes with mathematicians Norbert Wiener and E. B. Wilson, and studied radio engineering with George Washington Pierce at Harvard's Cruft Laboratory. His master's thesis, completed in 1921 under Vannevar Bush, addressed vacuum tube design. During 1921–1922, he also worked as radio editor for the Boston Evening Transcript.

He married Lois Wuerpel in 1922.

== Career at MIT ==
=== Communications Option and early research ===
Bowles joined the MIT faculty as an instructor in 1921 and was promoted to assistant professor in 1925. Department chairman Dugald C. Jackson encouraged him to develop a new undergraduate program in electrical communications. The resulting "Communications Option" (Course VI-C), launched in 1924, attracted students interested in the rapidly expanding field of radio. By 1930, the option enrolled over thirty students annually and operated the department's largest laboratory.

Bowles's early technical work included development of the multivibrator, a circuit that used a tuning fork or crystal to maintain a precise radio frequency. This contributed to the broader effort to stabilize radio transmissions, a persistent problem in early broadcasting.

His relationship with Vannevar Bush, who was rapidly accumulating power within the department through his differential analyzer project, was complex. Bowles later acknowledged that Bush was "brilliant" while he himself was not, and that the competitive tension "made me work all the harder." To maintain independence from Bush's expanding operation, Bowles cultivated his own sources of external funding and research partnerships.

=== Round Hill Research Station ===
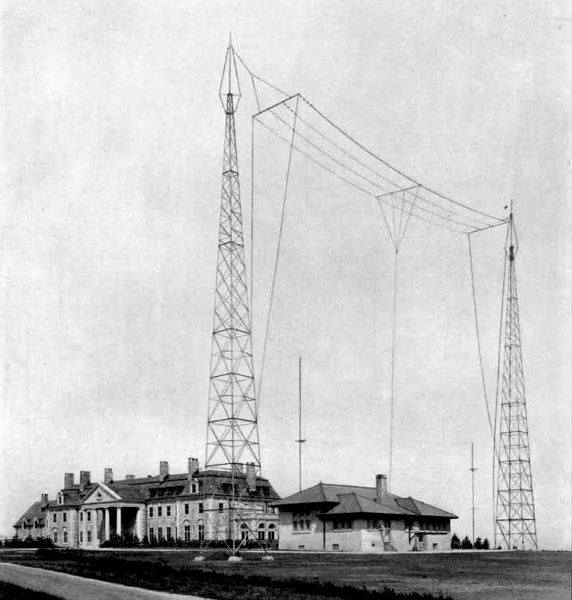
Radio tower at the Round Hill Research Station

In 1926, MIT established a research program at Round Hill, a 277-acre estate in South Dartmouth, Massachusetts, owned by the eccentric philanthropist Colonel Edward H. R. Green. Green, who had made his fortune in railroads and inherited another from his mother Hetty Green, was fascinated by radio and willing to fund experimental work. Bowles became director of the Round Hill program and found in Green a patron who gave him financial independence and considerable freedom.

The station initially operated a shortwave radio facility (call sign 1XV, later WMAF) that gained recognition for maintaining contact with Donald Baxter MacMillan's Labrador expedition in 1927 and Richard E. Byrd's Antarctic expedition in 1929. The WMAF-WEAF link, which transmitted programs from New York via telephone lines, was among the earliest experiments in network broadcasting.

Through the late 1920s and 1930s, research at Round Hill shifted toward problems of aircraft navigation in poor visibility. Julius Adams Stratton, later president of MIT, conducted theoretical studies on radio wave propagation through fog. Meteorologist Henry G. Houghton and engineer William H. Radford investigated the physical properties of fog, discovering through microscope studies that fog droplets varied in size and composition. Houghton's fog dissipation experiments, which sprayed calcium chloride from a suspended pipeline, were considered among the earliest successful demonstrations of weather manipulation and contributed to the emerging field of cloud physics. The Navy, Army Air Corps, Bureau of Air Commerce, and even the Massachusetts Humane Society contributed funding.

After Green's death in June 1936, the estate became tied up in litigation among competing heirs and tax authorities. The Round Hill program returned to Cambridge in 1937.

=== Blind landing and aircraft detection ===
Beginning in 1937, Bowles led a project sponsored by the Civil Aeronautics Authority and Sperry Corporation to develop a radio-based instrument landing system. The "three-spot" system, conceived by Irving Metcalf of the Bureau of Air Commerce, used overlapping radio beams to guide pilots along a straight-line glide path, with the information displayed on a cathode-ray tube indicator developed by Charles Stark Draper. The work drew on microwave research by Bowles's colleague Wilmer L. Barrow and involved graduate students including Donald E. Kerr and Frank D. Lewis.

By 1939, this instrument landing research had spun off into work on aircraft detection using ultra-high frequencies. Bowles arranged funding from Sperry, the Army Air Corps, and the private Loomis Laboratory operated by Alfred Loomis in Tuxedo Park, New York. These projects trained a cohort of engineers and physicists who would soon staff the wartime radar effort.

=== Microwave Committee ===
In the fall of 1940, the newly formed National Defense Research Committee (NDRC) asked Loomis and Bowles to lead a Microwave Committee charged with surveying radar development across the country and recommending a site for a major new laboratory. Loomis became chairman and Bowles secretary. After inspecting facilities at military and industrial laboratories, the committee recommended in October 1940 that MIT host the new facility. Bowles helped find space on campus for what became the MIT Radiation Laboratory.

The Radiation Laboratory was organized primarily by physicists—Loomis, MIT president Karl Taylor Compton, and laboratory director Lee DuBridge. Bowles, an engineer, increasingly felt marginalized. By early 1942, he was ready to leave.

== World War II ==
=== Expert Consultant to the Secretary of War ===
In April 1942, Secretary of War Henry Stimson, Loomis' cousin, summoned Bowles to the Pentagon and asked him to evaluate a critical British report on American radar installations in the Panama Canal Zone. Bowles' performance impressed Stimson, and within days he was installed in Room 4-E-936, directly above the Secretary's office, as Expert Consultant to the Secretary of War.

Stimson gave Bowles broad authority to examine all aspects of radar development, procurement, training, and operations. His first major assignment was the U-boat crisis. German submarines were sinking Allied merchant ships at an alarming rate along the American East Coast, and existing countermeasures were failing.

Bowles concluded that the problem was not merely technological but organizational. New radar equipment could not be treated as a "magic gadget" whose installation would automatically produce results; effective use required a command structure designed to integrate science with operations. In May 1942, he proposed to Stimson a "Vitalization of the ASV Submarine Destruction Program," and within days the Army Air Forces established the Sea Search Attack Development Unit (SADU) at Langley Field, Virginia. SADU equipped bombers with radar developed at the Radiation Laboratory, along with electrical altimeters, magnetic anomaly detectors, rocket flares, depth charges, homing devices, and sonobuoys.

More broadly, Bowles advocated shifting from defensive reliance on convoys to an offensive strategy of air search—using land-based aircraft to hunt submarines rather than merely escorting ships. Stimson, George C. Marshall, and Henry H. Arnold supported the approach; the Navy, protective of its prerogatives, was slower to embrace it.

=== Communications Consultant to the Army Air Forces ===
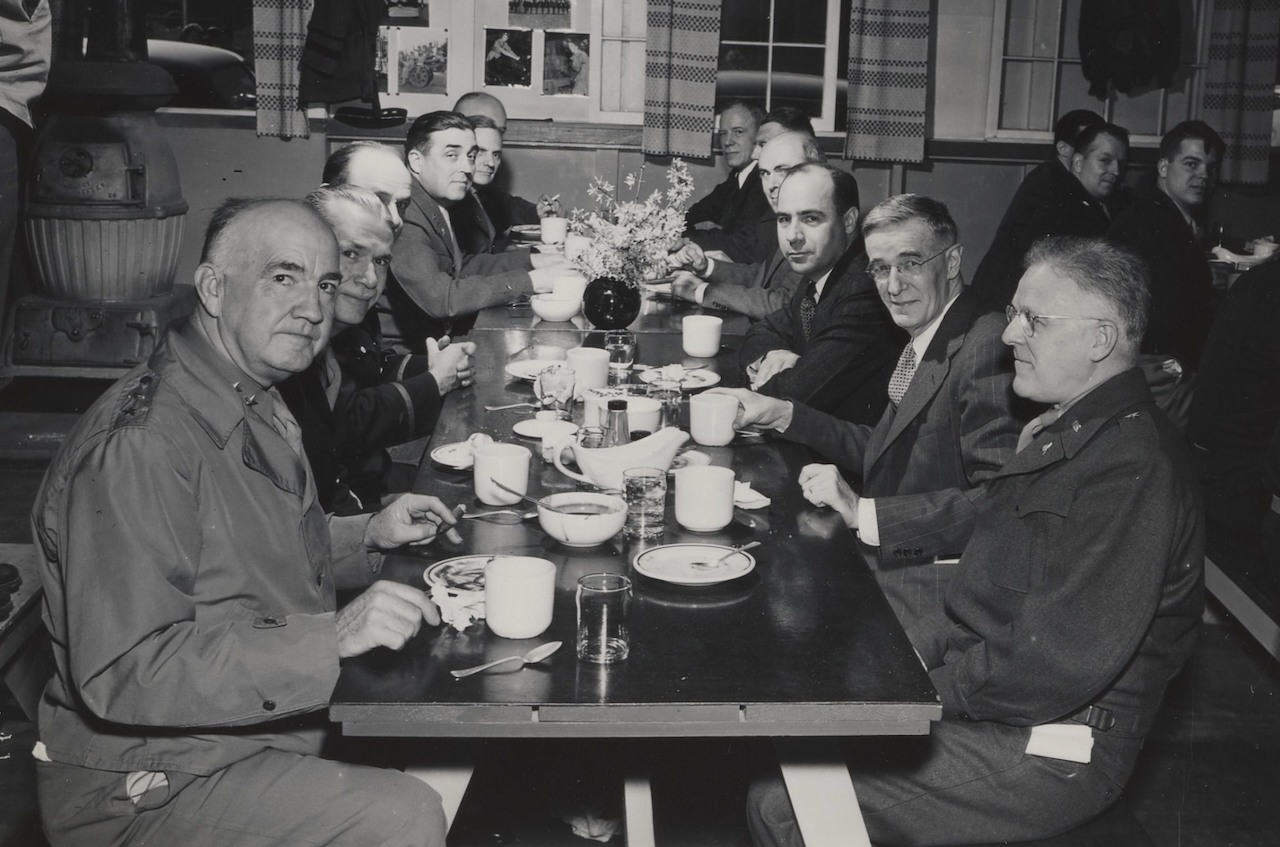
Bowles and Vannevar Bush dining with Army Air Force officers

In August 1943, at General Arnold's insistence, Bowles took on the additional role of Special Consultant to the Commanding General, Army Air Forces, with authority over all communications matters. He successfully pushed to elevate the Air Communications Office to independent special staff status.

Bowles developed a distinctive approach to integrating civilian expertise into military operations. He conducted preliminary surveys of overseas commands to assess equipment needs, then dispatched teams he formally designated "Advisory Specialist Groups"—scientists and engineers drawn from universities and industry—to work directly with field commanders. Among those he recruited were physicist William Shockley, who conducted studies on B-29 bomber operations, and Hartley Rowe, chief engineer of United Fruit Company, whom Bowles assigned as field adviser to General Dwight D. Eisenhower's command. By war's end, his office had deployed over seventy expert consultants.

In summer 1944, when German V-1 flying bombs began striking Britain, Bowles helped expedite the dispatch of countermeasures to Eisenhower's command. He later wrote that 90 percent of the buzz bombs were destroyed.

The 1946 citation for his Distinguished Service Medal, presented by General Arnold, credited Bowles with conceiving "an advisory group composed of select electronics specialists" and placing "scientific personnel on the staffs of all major A.A.F. commands to assist in the introduction and development of radar to its full application in the uses of modern Air warfare."

== Founding of RAND ==
As the war wound down, Bowles joined discussions about how to preserve the wartime collaboration between scientists and the military. General Arnold, who foresaw an age of intercontinental missiles and wanted to keep scientists engaged with Air Force planning, was the driving force. In October 1945, Arnold convened a lunch meeting at Hamilton Field near San Francisco with Bowles, Donald Douglas, and Douglas Aircraft employees Frank Collbohm and Arthur Raymond. Arnold announced he had $30 million remaining in his wartime research budget and proposed funding an independent organization of civilian scientists to study future weapons development. Douglas agreed to house the group, and Collbohm became its first director. Raymond suggested the name RAND, for "Research and Development."

Air Force Project RAND was established in early 1946 as a division of Douglas Aircraft in Santa Monica, California. Bowles was initially enthusiastic, but he soon grew concerned that RAND's open-ended contract was allowing it to expand beyond practical focus on concrete research and development problems. He had envisioned a series of smaller, more focused RAND-type organizations rather than a single large institution. When RAND separated from Douglas to become an independent nonprofit corporation in 1948, Bowles was no longer in a position to influence its direction.

== Postwar career ==
Bowles's wartime patrons—Stimson and Arnold—both retired within a year of the war's end. In 1947, shortly after deciding to sever his ties with MIT, Bowles was dismissed from his War Department position when it was absorbed into the new National Military Establishment. He did not return to MIT's electrical engineering department. He had been passed over for the directorship of the new Research Laboratory of Electronics, which went to his former student Julius Stratton, and he sensed that MIT president Compton and others did not want him back. Instead, he became a consulting professor (1947–1963) and transferred his affiliation to what became the MIT Sloan School of Management, retiring as professor emeritus in 1963.

From 1947 to 1966, Bowles served as general consultant to the president of Raytheon Company. He continued defense work as scientific consultant to the United States Air Force (1947–1957), scientific warfare adviser to the Weapons Systems Evaluation Group in the Office of the Secretary of Defense (1950–1952), and consultant to the Secretary of the Army (1951–1954).

From 1955 to 1958, he chaired the Ad Hoc Advisory Committee on Allocations for the Senate Committee on Interstate and Foreign Commerce, which recommended policies for distributing UHF television channels.

In later years, Bowles held directorships at Scientific Development Corporation (1959–1964), Jarrell-Ash Company (1965–1966), White Consolidated Industries (1966–1977), and other firms. He served as president of Whitin Machine Works (1965–1966) and chairman and president of Information Transfer Corporation (1968–1970). He was a trustee of Bentley College (1969–1977) and Newton-Wellesley Hospital (from 1981).

== Personal life and death ==
Bowles married Lois Wuerpel in 1922. They had two sons, Edmund A. and Frederick W. The family lived in Wellesley, Massachusetts.

In his final years, Bowles suffered from Parkinson's disease. He died on September 5, 1990, in a nursing home in Weston, Massachusetts, at age 92.

== Honors and memberships ==
For his war work, Bowles received the Distinguished Service Medal in 1945, the Presidential Medal of Merit in 1948, and was appointed Honorary Commander of the Civil Division of the Order of the British Empire in 1948. He received an honorary Doctor of Science from Norwich University in 1945.

He was a fellow of the American Academy of Arts and Sciences, the American Institute of Electrical Engineers, the American Physical Society, and the American Association for the Advancement of Science. He was a senior member of the Institute of Radio Engineers, a member of the Society for the Promotion of Engineering Education, and a member of Sigma Xi.

== Sources ==
- Kaplan, Fred (June–July 1983). "Scientists at War: The Birth of the RAND Corporation". American Heritage. 34 (4).
- Kevles, Daniel (1995) [1978]. The Physicists: The History of a Scientific Community in Modern America (2nd ed.). Cambridge, MA: Harvard University Press – via Internet Archive.
- Guerlac, Henry E. (1987) [1946]. Radar in World War II. Tomash/American Institute of Physics.. Vol 2
- Pang, Alex Soojung-Kim (1990). "Edward Bowles and Radio Engineering at MIT, 1920-1940". Historical Studies in the Physical and Biological Sciences. 20 (2): 313–337. doi:10.2307/27757646. JSTOR 27757646.
- Wildes, Karl L.; Lindgren, Nilo A. (1985). A Century of Electrical Engineering and Computer Science at MIT, 1882-1982. Cambridge, MA: MIT Press. ISBN 978-0-262-29103-3.
- Thomas, William (2015). Rational Action: The Sciences of Policy in Britain and America, 1940–1960. Cambridge, MA: MIT Press. ISBN 978-0-262-02850-9.
