= Henry C. Bourne Jr. =

- Born: December 31, 1921; Tarboro, North Carolina
- Died: March 25, 2010 (aged 88); Winston-Salem, North Carolina
- Education: MIT
- Awards: IEEE Fellow; AAAS Fellow
- Scientific career
- Fields: Electrical engineering
- Workplaces: U.S. Army Corps of Engineers; MIT; UC Berkeley; Rice University; National Science Foundation; Georgia Institute of Technology

Henry Clark Bourne Jr. (December 31, 1921 – March 25, 2010) was an American electrical engineer, administrator and faculty member at the Georgia Institute of Technology from 1981 until 1993. He was initially recruited by Georgia Tech president Joseph M. Pettit to be Georgia Tech's vice president of academic affairs; Bourne focused on faculty recruitment. Bourne would later serve as Georgia Tech's interim president after Pettit died of cancer in 1986.

He established, and is the namesake for, the Margaret T. and Henry C. Bourne Jr. Chair in Poetry, first held by Thomas Lux, and now held by Ilya Kaminsky.

== Early life and education ==
Born in Tarboro, North Carolina, Bourne graduated from Virginia Episcopal School in 1940. He earned a bachelor's degree in 1944, a Master's in 1948, and a Ph.D. in 1952, all from the Massachusetts Institute of Technology and in electrical engineering. His education was put on hold during World War II, when he served in the Army Corps of Engineers from 1943 to 1946. While at MIT, he was a member of Delta Tau Delta.

== Career ==
Following graduation, he served on the MIT faculty until he joined the University of California, Berkeley, at which he was a professor of electrical engineering from 1954 to 1963. He then went to Rice University, where he was a professor for 16 years and chair of the electrical engineering department for 11 of those years. Bourne then left for the National Science Foundation (NSF) in Washington, D.C., where he was the deputy assistant director of Engineering and Applied Science. While at NSF, Bourne met Joseph M. Pettit, who served on the National Science Board.

Bourne came to Tech in 1981 to serve as vice president of Academic Affairs. He was recruited by Pettit from the National Science Foundation, where as deputy assistant director of engineering and applied science he "had helped pioneer programs in microelectronics that brought the government, universities and industry together as partners".

During his time at Tech, Bourne interviewed prospective professors and was involved in the Centennial Campaign, touring the country with Bobby Dodd on the Alumni Club circuit to raise money and support for the campaign. When Pettit died of cancer in 1986, Bourne was appointed acting president, a position he held for 13 months. He returned to his post as vice president of Academic Affairs after John Patrick Crecine was appointed president. About a year later, Bourne returned to teaching. He taught electrical engineering at Tech for four years, retiring in 1993.

An avid reader and book lover, Bourne thought it was important that students of technical fields also nurture their artistic sides through the humanities. He and his wife, named honorary alumni in 1987, established the Margaret T. and Henry C. Bourne Jr. chair in poetry at Georgia Tech.

== Memberships and awards ==
Bourne was a lifetime member of the Institute of Electrical and Electronics Engineers and was named an IEEE Fellow in 1979 for "contributions to the theory and application of magnetic thin films and magnetic amplifiers and to electrical engineering education". He was named an honorary research associate at University College London, and a Fellow of the AAAS, the American Association for the Advancement of Science.
