= Radio Research Laboratory (Harvard) =

Secret laboratory during World War II

The Radio Research Laboratory (RRL), located on the campus of Harvard University, was an 800-person secret research laboratory during World War II. Under the U.S. Office of Scientific Research and Development (OSRD), it was a spinoff of the Radiation Laboratory (Rad Lab) at MIT and set up to develop electronic countermeasures to enemy radars and communications, as well as electronic counter-countermeasures (ECCM) to circumvent enemy ECM. The RRL was directed by Frederick E. Terman and operated between 1942 and 1946.

The RRL was engaged in both analysis and hardware development. They made significant contributions to the basic understanding of methods, theories, and circuits at very-high and ultra-high frequencies for radio systems, particularly in signals intelligence gear and statistical communications techniques. However, unlike the Rad Lab, the RRL never released significant details on its accomplishments; ECM and ECCM have always been closely guarded secrets by all nations.

The RRL conducted considerable work on chaff, light-weight aluminum strips dropped in clouds from aircraft to confuse enemy radars. Fred L. Whipple, an astronomer, made detailed analytical studies of this and devised a formula giving radar cross-section at a given wavelength per kilogram of chaff.

An example of RRL hardware development was Tuba (aka 'Project Tuba'), a giant ECM system generating continuous 80-kW signals in the range of 300-600 MHz to jam German Lichtenstein radars. The power tube (called Resnatron) for Tuba was developed at the RRL by David H. Shone and Lauritsen C. Marshall. Tuba used a horn antenna built of mesh wire 150 feet long and driven through 22- by 6- inch waveguides, possibly the largest ever built. Tuba was placed in operation in mid-1944 on the south coast of England. The radiated energy was such that it lit fluorescent bulbs a mile away and jammed radars throughout Europe.

The RRL staff did document some of the general theory that they developed. After the war, this was released in a two-volume publication Very High-Frequency Techniques, edited by Herbert J. Reich (McGraw-Hill, 1947).
