= Decade box =

Electronic test equipment

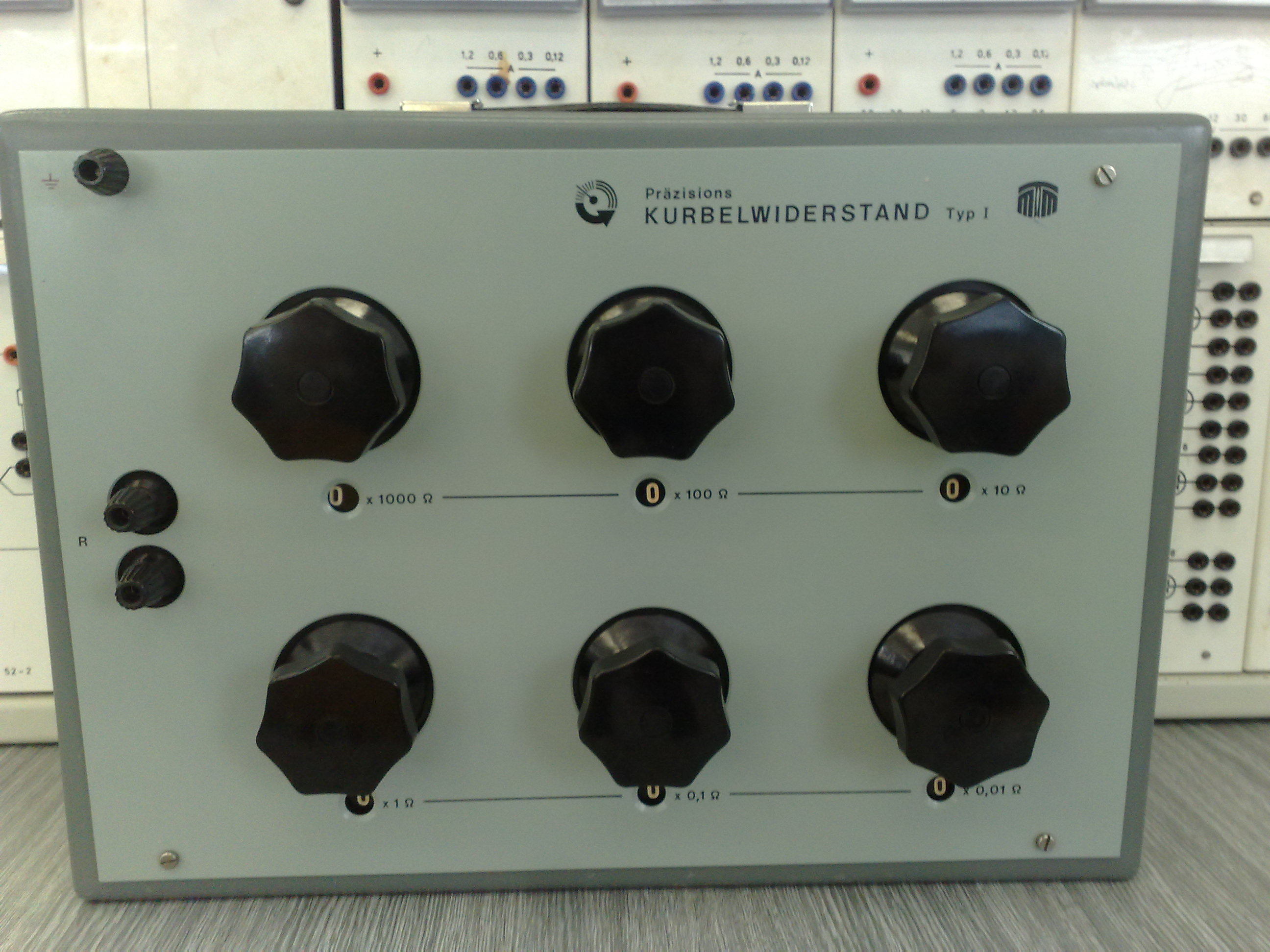
A resistance decade box, made in East Germany

A decade box is a piece of test equipment that can be used during prototyping of electronic circuits to substitute the interchanging of different values of certain passive components with a single variable output. Decade boxes are made for resistance, capacitance, and inductance, the values of which can be adjusted incrementally by the turning of a knob or switch, with the contacts of the switch moving along a series of the respective components. The interface for these devices usually consists of dials or adjustable tape counters, and they are operated in-circuit and without any external power source.
