= Louis Ridenour =

American physicist (1911–1959)

Louis Nicot Ridenour
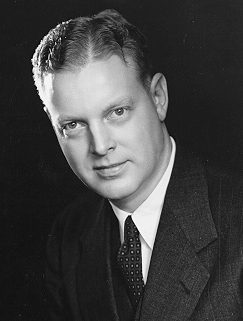
- Born: June 27, 1911; Montclair, New Jersey, United States
- Died: May 21, 1959 (aged 47)
- Education: University of Chicago (B.S. Physics); California Institute of Technology (Ph. D. Physics)
- Known for: Radar
- Scientific career
- Fields: Physics
- Workplaces: Princeton University Instructor 1935 ~ 1938; University of Pennsylvania 1938 ~ 1941; M.I.T. Assistant Director of Radiation Laboratory 1941 ~ 1946; University of Illinois 1947 ~ 1950; International Telemeter 1952 ~ 1955; Lockheed Aircraft Corporation 1955 ~ 1959; National Security Agency

Louis N. Ridenour (June 27, 1911 – May 21, 1959) was a physicist instrumental in the U.S. development of radar, Vice President of Lockheed, and an advisor to President Dwight D. Eisenhower.

== Biography and positions held ==
During World War II, Ridenour worked at the MIT Radiation Laboratory. He was co-leader with Ivan A. Getting of the group that developed the SCR-584 radar. He directed a committee in 1949 that recommended the establishment of a separate Research and Development Command and a new Air Staff Deputy Chief of Staff for Research and Development. In 1950, Ridenour was named the first Chief Scientist of the U.S. Air Force.

He served on the Scientific Advisory Committee for the Ballistic Research Laboratories at Aberdeen Proving Ground.

In 1941, he became the assistant director of the Massachusetts Institute of Technology Radiation Laboratory and helped transform primitive radar into a reliable defensive and offensive military tool. In 1946, Ridenour returned to the University of Pennsylvania for one year and then in 1947, he became dean of the Graduate College of the University of Illinois. During the next three years as dean, he was instrumental in establishing the Control Systems Laboratory, the Digital Computer Laboratory, and the Radio Carbon Laboratory, as well as a microbiology group and solid state group.

He was chairman of the National Security Agency Scientific Advisory Board Panel on Electronics and Data Processing from its inception on January 27, 1959, until his death in May.

In 1960, he was awarded, posthumously, the Theodore von Kármán Award from the Air Force Association.

Ridenour was married to Gretchen Kraemer; they had two daughters, Nancy Page Buchanan (née Ridenour) and Eleanor Fay.

Ridenour died of a brain hemorrhage on May 21, 1959, at age 47. His close associate, Dudley Allen Buck, died the same day.

== Major contributions ==
Ridenour led the development of airborne microwave radar nicknamed "Micky", which allowed bombing through clouds.

Along with Gilbert W. King, Edwin L. Hughes, and George W. Brown, Ridenour patented an information storage system which combined optical disk storage of large capacity and a magnetic drum memory of low capacity. The write-once-read-many optical disk memory would be updated monthly, and recently changed data is held on the re-writable magnetic drum memory.

== Patents ==
- U.S. patent 2,473,175 Radio-Direction-Finding System
- U.S. patent 2,843,655 Subscription Television with Scrambled Transmission and Marquee and Barker
- U.S. patent 2,843,841 Information Storage System
- U.S. patent 2,875,269 Video Scrambling and Unscrambling System
- U.S. patent 2,918,522 Subscription Television Distribution System
- U.S. patent 2,972,008 Coding Methods and System

== Publications ==
Author of Radar System Engineering, volume 1 of MIT Radiation Laboratory Series. McGraw-Hill, New York, 1947.

Ridenour contributed to the Bulletin of the Atomic Scientists.
