= Daniel Kevles =

American historian of science (born 1939)

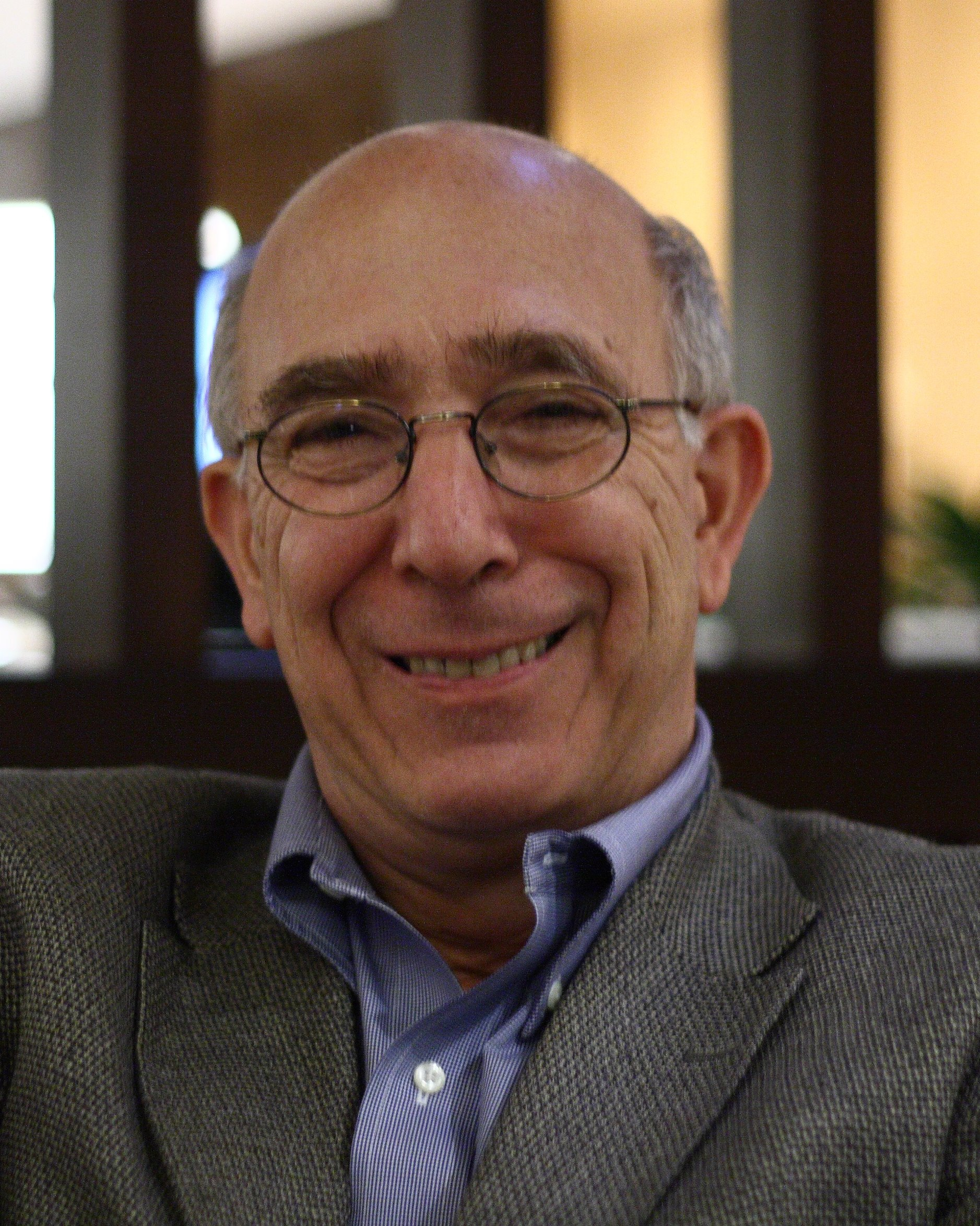
Daniel J. Kevles at the 2007 History of Science Society meeting

Daniel J. Kevles (born 2 March 1939 in Philadelphia, Pennsylvania) is an American historian of science best known for his books on American physics and eugenics and for a wide-ranging body of scholarship on science and technology in modern societies. He is Stanley Woodward Professor of History, Emeritus at Yale University and J. O. and Juliette Koepfli Professor of the Humanities, Emeritus at the California Institute of Technology.

== Biography ==
Kevles received his BA in physics from Princeton University in 1960 and his PhD in history from Princeton in 1964. He taught at the California Institute of Technology from 1964 to 2001 and Yale University from 2001 to 2015. Since 2015, he has held additional appointments at Columbia University and New York University.

In 2001 Kevles received the George Sarton Medal of the History of Science Society, awarded for "a lifetime of scholarly achievement". In 1999 his book The Baltimore Case was awarded the Watson Davis and Helen Miles Davis Prize for best book in the history of science directed to a wide public. Kevles is a Fellow of the American Association for the Advancement of Science and the American Academy of Arts and Sciences and a member of the American Philosophical Society and the Society of American Historians.

In 2000 the mathematician Serge Lang waged an unsuccessful campaign to prevent Kevles from being granted tenure at Yale, asserting that Kevles' book The Baltimore Case was too sympathetic to David Baltimore. Although criticized publicly by Lang and several other scientists, the book was also praised by others for meticulous scholarship and detailed reporting.

== Research ==
Kevles' research has focused primarily on the history of science in America and the interactions between science and society. A central theme in much of his work has been the tension between elite science and the norms of democratic control. He is best known for his accessible and original interpretative histories of physics and eugenics, and for an extensive body of scholarship that ranges widely across the histories of the physical sciences, life sciences, and technology.

His books include The Physicists (1978), a history of the American physics community, In the Name of Eugenics (1985), currently the standard text on the history of eugenics in the United States and Britain, and The Baltimore Case (1998), a study of accusations of scientific fraud. He is also a co-author of the textbook Inventing America: A History of the United States (2002; 2nd edition 2006) and co-editor with Leroy Hood of The Code of Codes (1992), a set of essays that explore scientific and social issues surrounding the Human Genome Project. Recently he has been working on a history of the uses of intellectual property in living organisms from the eighteenth century to the present and a co-authored history of the National Academy of Sciences.

Throughout his career, Kevles has brought the history of science and technology to a broad audience through his contributions to general readership publications. These have included pieces in The New Yorker, The New York Times, The New York Review of Books, Times Literary Supplement, Scientific American, and The Huffington Post, among others. The serialized version of his book In the Name of Eugenics, published in The New Yorker in 1984, received the 1985 Page One Award for excellence in science reporting.

== Selected publications ==
- The Physicists: The History of a Scientific Community in Modern America (Alfred A. Knopf, 1978; Harvard University Press 1987, 1995).
- In the Name of Eugenics: Genetics and the Uses of Human Heredity (Alfred A. Knopf, 1985; with new preface Harvard University Press, 1995).
- The Baltimore Case: A Trial of Politics, Science, and Character (W. W. Norton, 1998).
- The code of codes: scientific and social issues in the human genome project (8. printing ed.). Cambridge, Mass.: Harvard Univ. Press. 2000. ISBN 9780674136465.
- Inventing America: A History of the United States, coauthor with Alex Keyssar, Pauline Maier, and Merritt Roe Smith (W. W. Norton, 2002; 2nd edition, 2006).
