= MIT Schwarzman College of Computing =

College at the Massachusetts Institute of Technology (MIT)

MIT Stephen A. Schwarzman College of Computing
- Type: Private computing college
- Established: January 1, 2020
- Parent institution: Massachusetts Institute of Technology
- Budget: $1.1 billion
- Dean: Daniel P. Huttenlocher
- Location: Cambridge, Massachusetts, United States
- Website: computing.mit.edu

The MIT Schwarzman College of Computing is the computing college at the Massachusetts Institute of Technology (MIT), a private land-grant research university in Cambridge, Massachusetts. Announced in 2018 to address the growing applications of computing technology, the college is an Institute-wide academic unit that works alongside MIT's five Schools of Architecture and Planning; Engineering; Humanities, Arts, and Social Sciences; Science; and Management. The college emphasizes artificial intelligence research, interdisciplinary applications of computing, and social and ethical responsibilities of computing. It aims to be an interdisciplinary hub for work in artificial intelligence, computer science, data science, and related fields. Its creation was the first significant change to MIT's academic structure since the early 1950s.

The MIT Schwarzman College of Computing is named after The Blackstone Group chairman Stephen A. Schwarzman, who donated $350 million of the college's $1.1 billion funding commitment. The college's funding sources were met with criticism, with students and staff contrasting MIT's stated emphasis on ethics against Schwarzman's controversial business practices and support for Donald Trump.

== Headquarters ==
The 2018 announcement of the college's creation included a 150,000–165,000-square-foot (13,900–15,300 m^{2}) new building to provide enough room on campus for 65 faculty members, plus graduate students and staff (most of which would be funded by the college). The new headquarters was designated as Building 45, reflecting the campus-wide number system and the chosen location on the site of Building 44. Building 44 had been home to MIT's cyclotron and a giant "J" sign celebrating the discovery of the J/psi meson. The Edgerton Student Shop, approximately six members of the Laboratory for Nuclear Science, and two physics classes were relocated to other buildings by summer 2019, and Building 44 was demolished starting in September 2019. The new building at 51 Vassar Street is being designed by the firm Skidmore, Owings & Merrill, and is expected to be complete in 2023. Plans were released in January, 2021.

== History ==
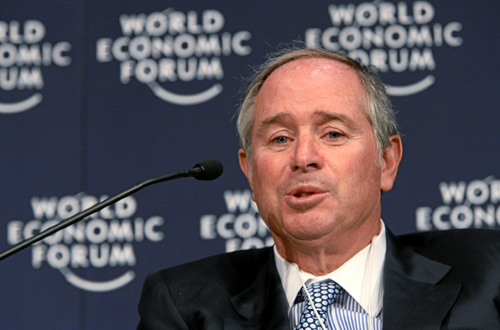
Stephen A. Schwarzman

On October 15, 2018, MIT president L. Rafael Reif announced the creation of the MIT Schwarzman College of Computing. MIT described the initiative as its response to the rise of artificial intelligence (AI) and computing technology. The main part of the college's funding consisted of a $350 million gift from businessman Stephen A. Schwarzman, characterized by Forbes as one of the largest donations made to a single academic institution.

The college was shaped by a several-year-long conversation between Reif and Schwarzman prior to the donation, where the two raised questions on the potential of AI and its future impacts on society. Schwarzman emphasized the global effects of AI and believed that America needed to invest further into developing the technology, and Reif desired a university-wide initiative that funds and promotes collaboration between departments. The resulting college sets a goal of educating "the bilinguals of the future", referring to students skilled in both computing and its applications to other fields. MIT also stated that the college would emphasize the ethics of AI and computing.

On February 21, 2019, MIT announced Daniel P. Huttenlocher as the inaugural dean of the college. Huttenlocher was praised for his "educational creativity, instinctive collegiality, intellectual depth and breadth, institutional savvy, and industry experience".

On February 26–28, 2019, MIT launched a three-day celebration of the college in an event named "Hello World, Hello MIT". The celebration featured panel discussions, an academic symposium, and talks from several notable figures. The speakers included Reif, Schwarzman, Massachusetts governor Charlie Baker, former Google CEO Eric Schmidt, author Thomas Friedman, and former US Secretary of State Henry Kissinger. The celebration received heavy criticism from several MIT students, faculty, and alumni, who protested the event and questioned the ethics of past actions by Schwarzman and Kissinger.

== Academics and research ==
The Schwarzman College of Computing has one academic department and several research enterprises which also have degree programs:

- Department of Electrical Engineering and Computer Science (EECS, more commonly known at MIT as Course 6), which is jointly administered with the School of Engineering. (established 1902) Upon creation of the college, the department formerly only in the School of Engineering was reorganized into three "overlapping subunits":
  - Electrical Engineering (EE)
  - Computer Science (CS)
  - Artificial Intelligence and Decision-Making (AI+D)
- Operations Research Center (ORC), jointly administered with the MIT Sloan School of Management (established 1953)
- Institute for Data, Systems and Society (IDSS) (established 2015)
  - Doctoral Program in Social and Engineering Systems
  - Technology and Policy Program (TPP, adegree program)
  - Sociotechnical Systems Research Center (SSRC)
  - Statistics and Data Science Center (SDSC)
    - Undergraduate Minor in Statistics and Data Science
    - Interdisciplinary Doctoral Program in Statistics (IDPS)
- Center for Computational Science and Engineering (CCSE, renamed from Center for Computational Engineering upon formation of the college) (established 2008)

The non-degree-granting research labs that are part of the college are:

- MIT Computer Science and Artificial Intelligence Laboratory (CSAIL)
- MIT Laboratory for Information and Decision Systems (LIDS)
- Quest for Intelligence
- MIT-IBM Watson AI Lab
- MIT Abdul Latif Jameel Clinic for Machine Learning in Health

The establishment of the college added 50 new faculty positions to the university. Half of these positions focus on computer science, while the other half are jointly appointed in collaboration with other departments in the Architecture and Planning, Engineering, Humanities, Arts, and Social Sciences, Science, and Management. The New York Times described the college's structure as an effort to "alter traditional academic thinking and practice" and allow the university to more effectively bring computing to other fields.

The creation of the College of Computing also started the development of three additional programs meant to integrate closely with other MIT computing activities, for which plans have not been finalized:

- Social and Ethical Responsibilities of Computing (SERC) aims to develop "responsible habits of mind and action" regarding computing technology. SERC facilitates the teaching of ethics throughout MIT courses, conducts research in social, ethical, and policy implications of technology, and coordinates public forums regarding technology and public policy. SERC has also published case studies
- Common Ground for Computing Education coordinates interdepartmental teaching in computing, supporting interdisciplinary courses, majors, and minors on computing and its applications.
- Center for Advanced Studies of Computing hosts research fellows and assists project-oriented programs in computing-related topics.

== Reception ==
=== Positive responses ===
MIT professor and AI researcher Patrick Winston praised the organization of the college and viewed it as an entity poised to serve "all of MIT". He expressed optimism regarding the college's long-term impacts, stating that he has "a very romantic dream of discoveries on par with those of Copernicus, ... Darwin, ... Watson and Crick".

Some MIT students spoke positively regarding the college's potential to "better manage the overflowing major" of computer science. At the time of the college's establishment, roughly 40 percent of MIT undergraduates majored in computer science or a joint program involving computer science.

=== Negative responses ===
MIT's creation of the Schwarzman College of Computing led to several negative responses. A group of MIT students, faculty, and alumni issued a strong criticism against the university's decision to accept money from Schwarzman, deeming it to be unethical. In an opinion piece in The Tech, they condemned Schwarzman's relationship as an advisor to US President Donald Trump, his ties to Saudi Arabian Crown Prince Mohammed bin Salman, and his firm's opposition to an affordable housing bill in California. Schwarzman's firm Blackstone responded that "advancing artificial intelligence responsibly is one of the most pressing challenges of our times and it should transcend politics".

From another perspective, some students questioned the societal value of MIT's focus on computing and AI. Viewing MIT administrators' emphasis on these technologies as a fad, they argued that MIT should instead promote research and education in areas that they believed to be more impactful. "[Why] aren't we putting this large sum of money into our climate change research, our urban planning department, or our economics and political science departments?" wrote a student in an opinion piece in The Tech. Students also described MIT's initiative to create the college as "very top-down in its approach" and expressed skepticism regarding "buy-in from faculty, staff, and students".

Outside of MIT, the Yale Daily News wrote that Schwarzman's donation to MIT "appeared to be a snub at Yale". The paper stated that an earlier donation to Yale for a $150 million Schwarzman Center led to similar controversies. The Schwarzman Center was viewed by its critics as "being driven by the donors rather than driven by the faculty and their mission". Schwarzman received his bachelor's degree from Yale in 1969.

== Notable people ==
Notable people affiliated with the MIT Schwarzman College of Computing include:

- Daniel P. Huttenlocher, dean, inaugural dean and vice provost of Cornell Tech
- Asuman Özdağlar, deputy dean of academics, head of the MIT Department of Electrical Engineering and Computer Science
- Daniela L. Rus, deputy dean of research, director of CSAIL, MIT professor of electrical engineering and computer science
- David Kaiser, associate dean, MIT professor of the history of science
- Julie Shah, associate dean, MIT associate professor of aeronautics and astronautics
