= Karl Compton =

American physicist and university president (1887–1954)

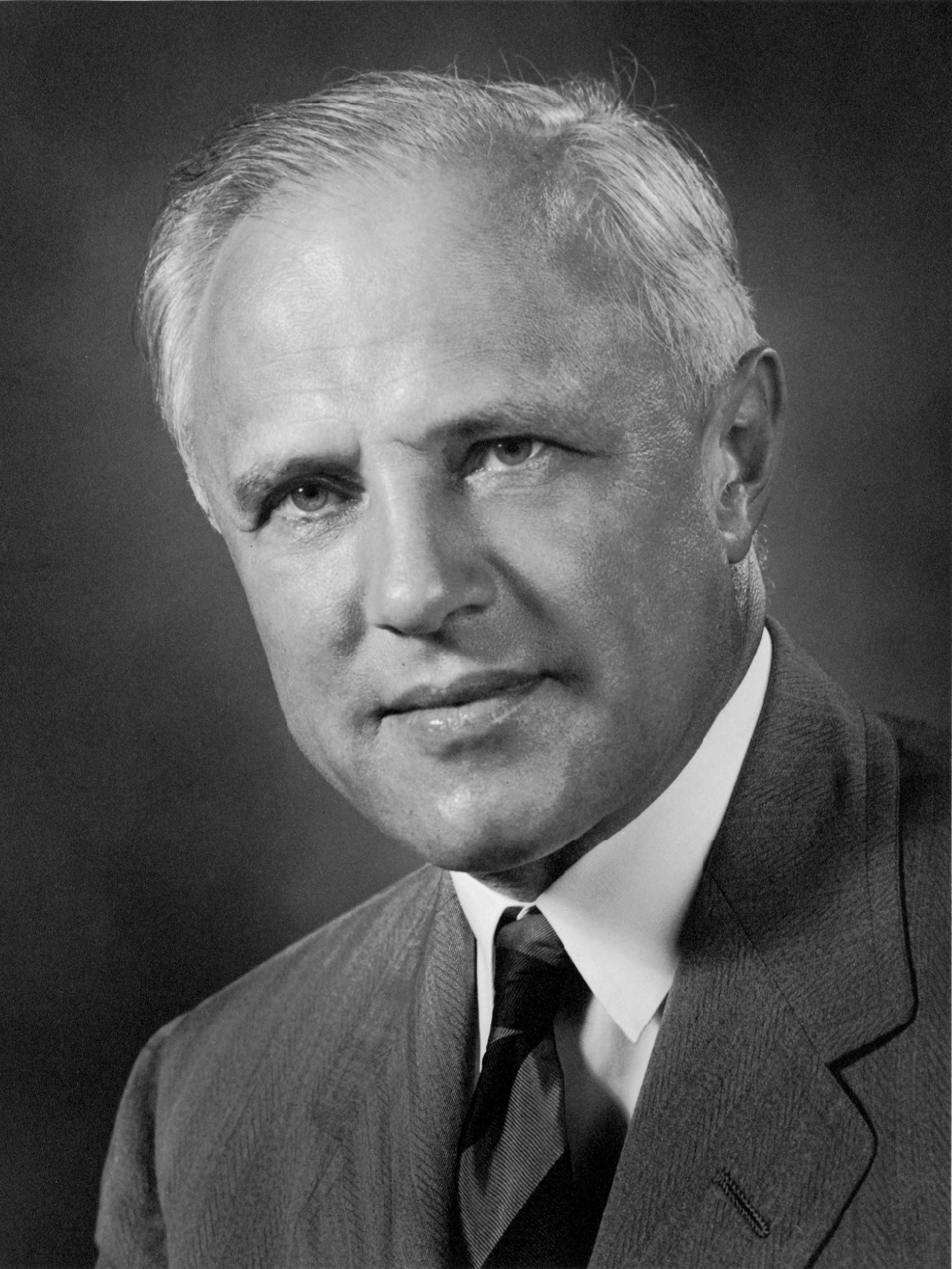
- Compton in 1944

9th President of the Massachusetts Institute of Technology
- In office 1930–1948
- Preceded by: Samuel Stratton
- Succeeded by: James R. Killian

Chair of the Research and Development Board
- In office 1948–1950
- Preceded by: Vannevar Bush
- Succeeded by: William Webster

Personal details
- Born: September 14, 1887 Wooster, Ohio, U.S.
- Died: June 22, 1954 (aged 66) New York City, New York, U.S.
- Resting place: Killian Court, MIT (ashes)
- Spouse(s): Rowena Raymond (m. 1913; died 1919) Margaret Hutchinson (m. 1921)
- Children: Mary Evelyn; Jean Corrin; Charles Arthur
- Parent(s): Elias Compton; Otelia Augspurger Compton
- Relatives: Arthur Compton (brother); Wilson M. Compton (brother); Mary Elesia Compton (sister)
- Education: College of Wooster (BA, MS); Princeton University (PhD)
- Awards: Medal for Merit (1946); Public Welfare Medal (1947); Hoover Medal (1950)
- Scientific career
- Fields: Physics
- Workplaces: College of Wooster; Reed College; Princeton University; Massachusetts Institute of Technology
- Thesis: The Influence of the Contact Difference of Potential between the Plates Emitting and Receiving Electrons Liberated by Ultraviolet Light on the Measurement of the Velocities of These Electrons (1912)
- Doctoral advisor: Owen Willans Richardson
- Doctoral students: Henry DeWolf Smyth; John Quincy Stewart; Carl Henry Eckart; Rao/Yao Yutai; Philip M. Morse; Wayne B. Nottingham
- Other notable students: Ivan Getting (S.B.)

Karl Taylor Compton (September 14, 1887 – June 22, 1954) was an American physicist and president of the Massachusetts Institute of Technology (MIT) from 1930 to 1948.

Working in electron physics, Compton produced early experimental verification of the photoelectric effect and conducted work on electrical plasmas. He spent two decades at Princeton University before assuming the MIT presidency. There, he initiated reforms that transformed MIT from an engineering school into a research university with strong programs in basic science. He created a School of Science, centralized the Institute's industry research contracts, and increased faculty autonomy from research sponsors. Working closely with Vice President Vannevar Bush, he broadened research funding sources and established one of the first university patent licensing programs Outside MIT, Compton advocated strenuously for science funding. He was the founding chairman of the American Institute of Physics and chaired President Roosevelt's Science Advisory Board.

As MIT president, Compton forged new links between universities and the military establishment. During the Second World War, Compton was a founding member of the National Defense Research Committee, chairing its radar and detection research program. He oversaw the establishment of the MIT Radiation Laboratory, the first major federal research contract with a university and one of the largest R&D projects of the war. He led a radar coordination mission to the United Kingdom in 1943 and was chief of the Office of Scientific Research and Development's Office of Field Service, deploying civilian scientists to combat theaters. He served on the Interim Committee that advised President Truman on the use of the atomic bomb, and later publicly defended the decision in a widely discussed Atlantic Monthly article. As scientific advisor to General Douglas MacArthur in the Pacific, he was among the first Americans to enter Tokyo after the Japanese surrender.

Working with the New England Council, he helped lay the groundwork for the modern venture capital industry. After the war, he co-founded the American Research and Development Corporation, widely regarded as the first modern venture capital firm. He chaired President Truman's commission on universal military training and led the Research and Development Board of the Department of Defense before declining health forced his retirement in 1949. He served as chairman of the MIT Corporation from 1948, and he remained active as a trustee of the Ford, Rockefeller, and Sloan Foundations until his death at sixty-six.

== Early life and education ==
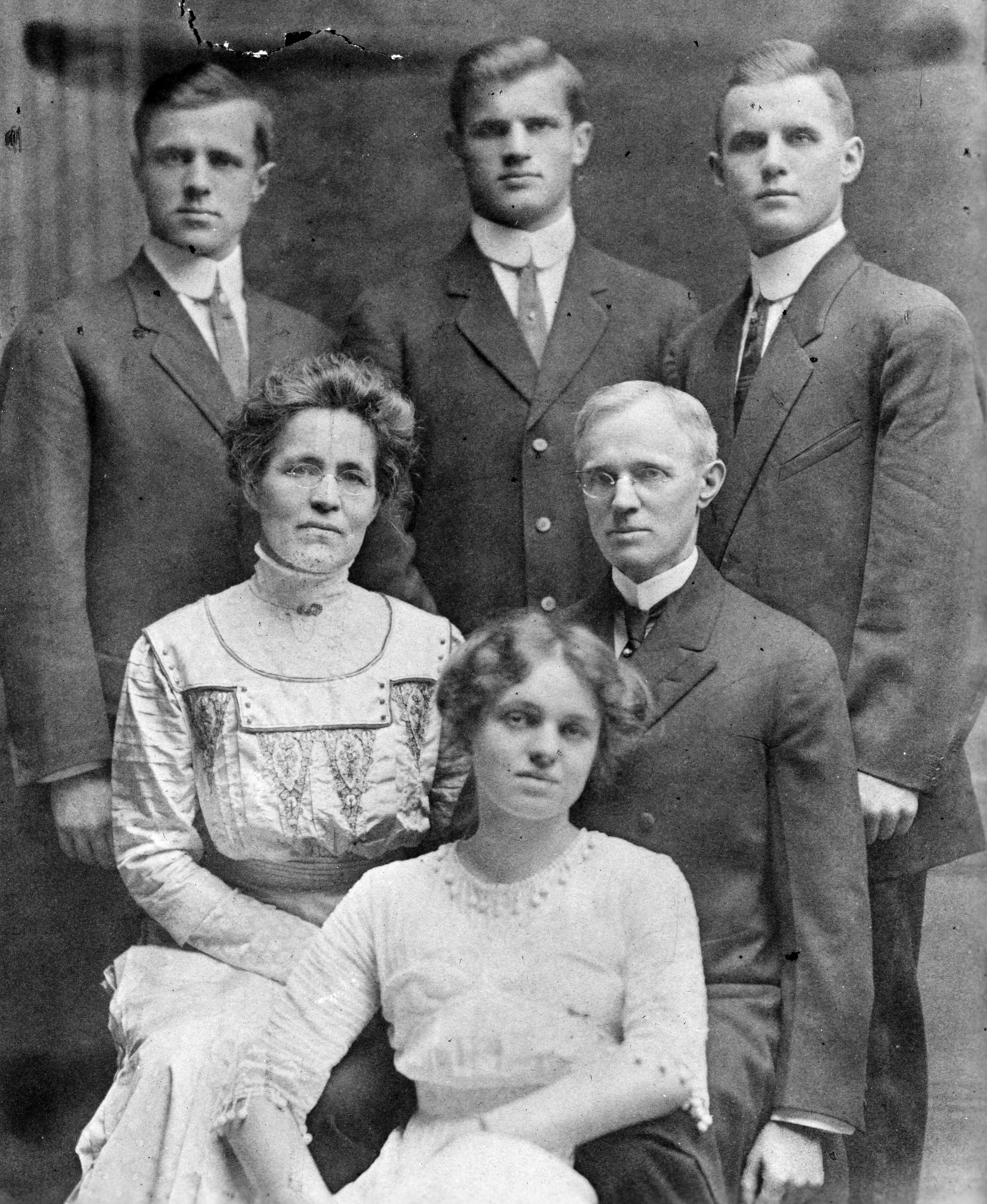
Karl, top left, with his family in Wooster

Karl Taylor Compton was born on September 14, 1887, in Wooster, Ohio, the eldest child of Elias and Otelia (Augspurger) Compton. He grew up on and around the campus of the College of Wooster, where his father taught Latin, philosophy, and psychology before serving as the college's first dean. Elias had originally intended to become a missionary but went into teaching after graduate study in theology and psychology; he earned a doctorate from Clark University in 1889. His mother's family were Mennonite farmers of German origin who had settled in Ohio, and the household combined Presbyterian observance with an unusual intellectual openness. Karl's sister Mary (b. 1889) went on to work at missionary colleges, and his brothers Wilson (b. 1890), and Arthur (b. 1892) became university presidents.

Beginning in 1897, the family spent summers at Otsego Lake in Michigan, where Karl developed his lifelong interests in fishing, canoeing, hiking, and hunting.

Elias's wide-ranging curiosity shaped his children's education. They read classics like Homer and Walter Scott as well as popular science writing about electricity and astronomy. Elias was one of the few Wooster faculty who publicly defended evolutionary theory. At Wooster, Karl moved from a brief interest in biology to physics, where he served as a laboratory assistant to George Bacon and excelled in mathematics. Compton was captain of the football team in his senior year, and was remembered for a freshman prank involving the college heating plant's 150-foot smokestack that displayed his class numerals for weeks.

From the age of eleven, Compton took paid work to cover college expenses: carrying hods on construction projects, skinning mules, canvassing books, working on farms and in tile and brick factories, and surveying the first mile of state-paved road in Ohio. He graduated cum laude with a Bachelor of Philosophy degree in 1908 and completed a master's degree under Bacon the following year. His master's thesis, on the principle of the Wehnelt electrolytic interrupter, was published in the February 1910 issue of Physical Review. A job offer from a missionary college in Korea materialized, but his father persuaded him to pursue a doctorate at a research university instead. Browsing university catalogs, he was drawn to Princeton by the presence of two Cavendish-trained physicists, James Jeans and Owen Richardson, and enrolled there in 1910.

Richardson—a legendarily poor lecturer—proved a difficult mentor, but Compton adapted. He focused his doctoral research on the photoelectric emission of electrons, contributing experimental evidence for Richardson's law of thermionic emission. Working with Richardson, he published several papers on the photoelectric effect and electron theory. Their joint 1912 paper in Science was among the earliest experimental confirmations of Einstein's 1905 explanation of photoelectric emission. In 1912, Compton received the Ph.D. summa cum laude, a distinction Princeton rarely awarded. He was also awarded the Porter Ogden Jacobus Fellowship. He then completed a postdoctoral year at Princeton before taking up his first teaching position.

== Teaching career ==
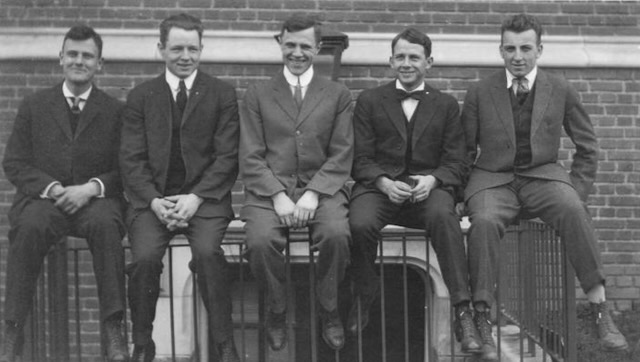
Teaching his first class at Reed, 1913

In June 1913, Compton married his Wooster classmate Rowena Rayman and the couple traveled to Portland, Oregon, where he had accepted an instructorship in physics at the newly founded Reed College. He took charge of physics instruction and laboratory development. Their daughter Mary Evelyn was born in December 1914, and Richardson recommended him for a position at Yale that could provide a higher salary. Princeton moved first, offering an assistant professorship, and Compton returned there in 1915.

At Princeton, his teaching acquired a reputation that his supervisor's had not. Richardson's lectures on electron theory were, by his students' account, among the worst given in the field. Compton's "clear, goal-oriented" instruction became a cornerstone of Princeton's physics program. He declined an employment offer from Willis Whitney, director of research at General Electric, but agreed to serve as an outside consultant, an arrangement that would last more than a decade. He and his brother Arthur co-invented the Compton electrometer, a voltage-measuring device, during this period.

During the First World War, Compton contributed to the Allied scientific effort in several capacities. In the summer of 1917 he joined physicist Augustus Trowbridge at Princeton in studying sound ranging methods for locating enemy artillery, and was subsequently attached to Edison Laboratories for research on torpedo propulsion and submarine detection. From December 1917 through January 1919, working through Robert Millikan and the National Research Council, he served with the U.S. Signal Corps in Washington, D.C., and then in Paris as associate scientific attaché at the U.S. embassy. In Paris, he prepared reports on artillery-sound and submarine-detection techniques for military and naval intelligence.

While expecting a second child, Rowena died suddenly in October 1919 of peritonitis due to a ruptured appendix. Compton remarried in July 1921. His second wife, Margaret Hutchinson, was the sister-in-law of a Princeton classics professor who had helped Compton through the period following Rowena's death. Margaret's father taught classics and mathematics at the University of Minnesota, and she was herself a Minnesota graduate who had gone into YWCA field work. The newlyweds honeymooned by canoe on the Boundary Waters Wilderness in northern Minnesota, covering two or three hundred miles over three weeks. They had two children: Jean Corrin (b. 1924) and Charles Arthur (b. 1927).

Returning to Princeton after the Armistice, Compton concentrated his research on electron collisions and became a pioneer in the experimental study of electrical plasmas, aggregates of subatomic particles whose behavior would later prove significant for controlled nuclear fusion. Over the following decade, his laboratory produced over one hundred papers and steady research on thermionic effects, ultraviolet spectroscopy, and the behavior of electrons in gases. He was made a full professor in June 1919.

Compton's leadership in professional societies steadily improved his standing in the discipline. He served as vice president of the American Physical Society in 1925 and president in 1927, chaired the physics section of the National Academy of Sciences from 1927 to 1930. He was also elected a fellow of the Optical Society of America and appointed a member of the American Philosophical Society (1923) and the National Academy of Sciences (1924). In 1926, a sabbatical year at the University of Göttingen placed him among a cohort of American physicists working under Max Born and James Franck, which included the young American graduate student J. Robert Oppenheimer.

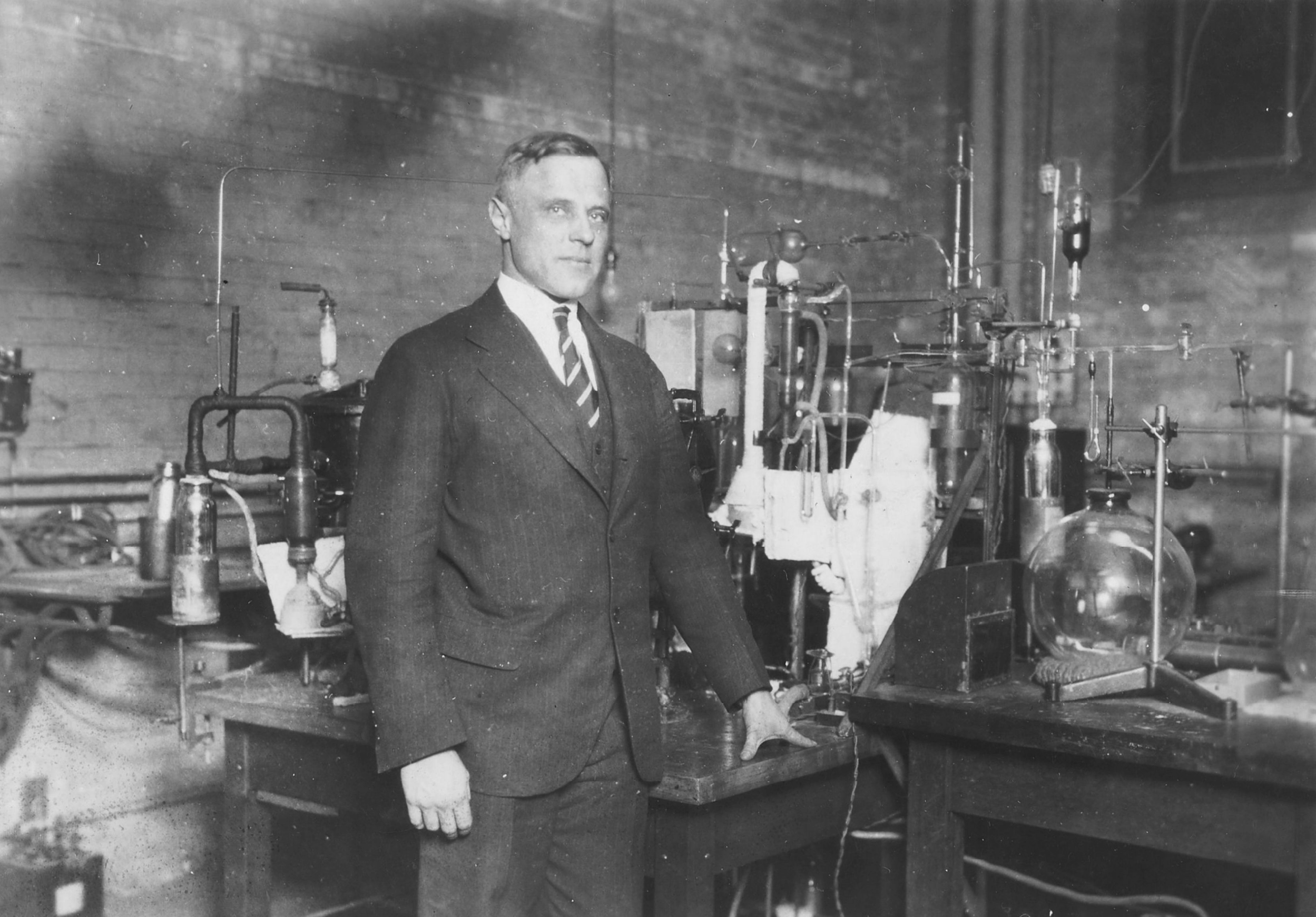
In Princeton's Palmer Lab (1929)

The University of Chicago recruited him heavily during this period, at one point even offering him a signed contract. In 1924, it proposed to hire Karl and his brother Arthur together. Arthur's work on X-ray scattering was gaining the momentum that would earn him the Nobel Prize in 1927. Princeton countered with an elevated salary, research funds, and a new endowed chair, the Cyrus Fogg Brackett professorship, freeing Compton from undergraduate teaching to focus on graduate work and research. In 1929, he became head of the physics department, intent on building Princeton's program into the best in the country.

The MIT Corporation's search for a new president intersected this plan the following January. Gerard Swope, a GE executive and MIT Corporation member who had long known Compton as a consultant, asked him in a private meeting whether he would consider the post. Compton was reluctant: he had no administrative ambitions, no desire to fundraise, and a laboratory and graduate program at a satisfying peak. He was persuaded by Frank Jewett, president of Bell Labs, who explained that what industry needed from MIT was not practical technicians, but graduates broadly educated in science and mathematics. "Jewett, who really knows these engineers, tells me I'm what the Institute needs," Compton told his wife Margaret on the drive home from Princeton Junction.

== MIT presidency before World War II ==
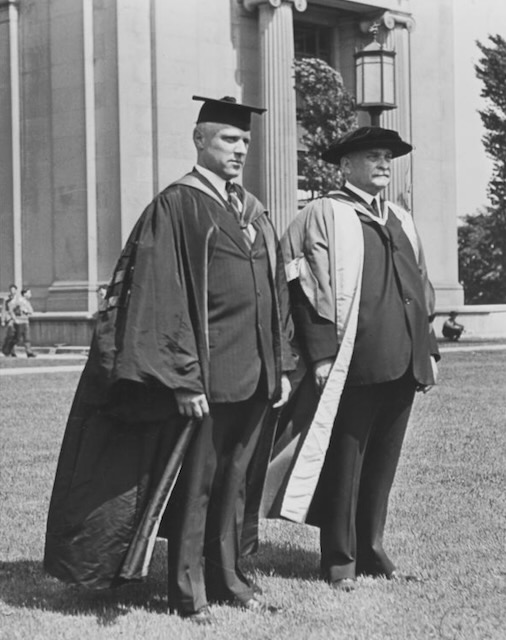
Compton's MIT inauguration, with the outgoing President Stratton

Compton was inaugurated on June 6, 1930, before several thousand guests assembled in MIT's Great Court. The Great Depression created significant new headwinds for the Corporation's ambitious plans for science investments. The same month, Gerard Swope announced the Technology Loan Plan, a plan to raise tuition and provide loan-based financial assistance to students in need, drawing contributions from George Eastman, Alfred P. Sloan Jr., and several members of the du Pont family.

=== Academic reforms ===
Compton's first sustained effort was to improve the science departments. He recruited John C. Slater, a theoretical physicist who had been an associate professor at Harvard, to chair the physics department, and brought George Harrison from Stanford to lead experimental work. Slater reorganized the graduate program and helped recruit a new generation of theoreticians and experimentalists. Improvements were evident when six National Research Council fellows chose MIT in 1932–33. The opening of the George Eastman Research Laboratories in 1932, which Compton had helped design to minimize vibration and foster contact between faculty and students, gave physics and chemistry a shared home for this work.

Compton became closely acquainted with Vannevar Bush through a confrontation with him. In 1931, Compton imposed a one-day-a-week limit on outside consulting and required faculty to deposit half their consulting income into a Professors' Fund, an effort to raise salaries and reduce work unrelated to the Institute's mission. Bush, who had consulting arrangements predating the policy, appeared in the president's office and announced he was leaving MIT. Compton offered an exception from the policy, which Bush refused. "Your whole damn fool plan," he said, "will dissolve in a welter of exceptions." Bush did not leave MIT, and later reported that he found Compton's openness disarming.

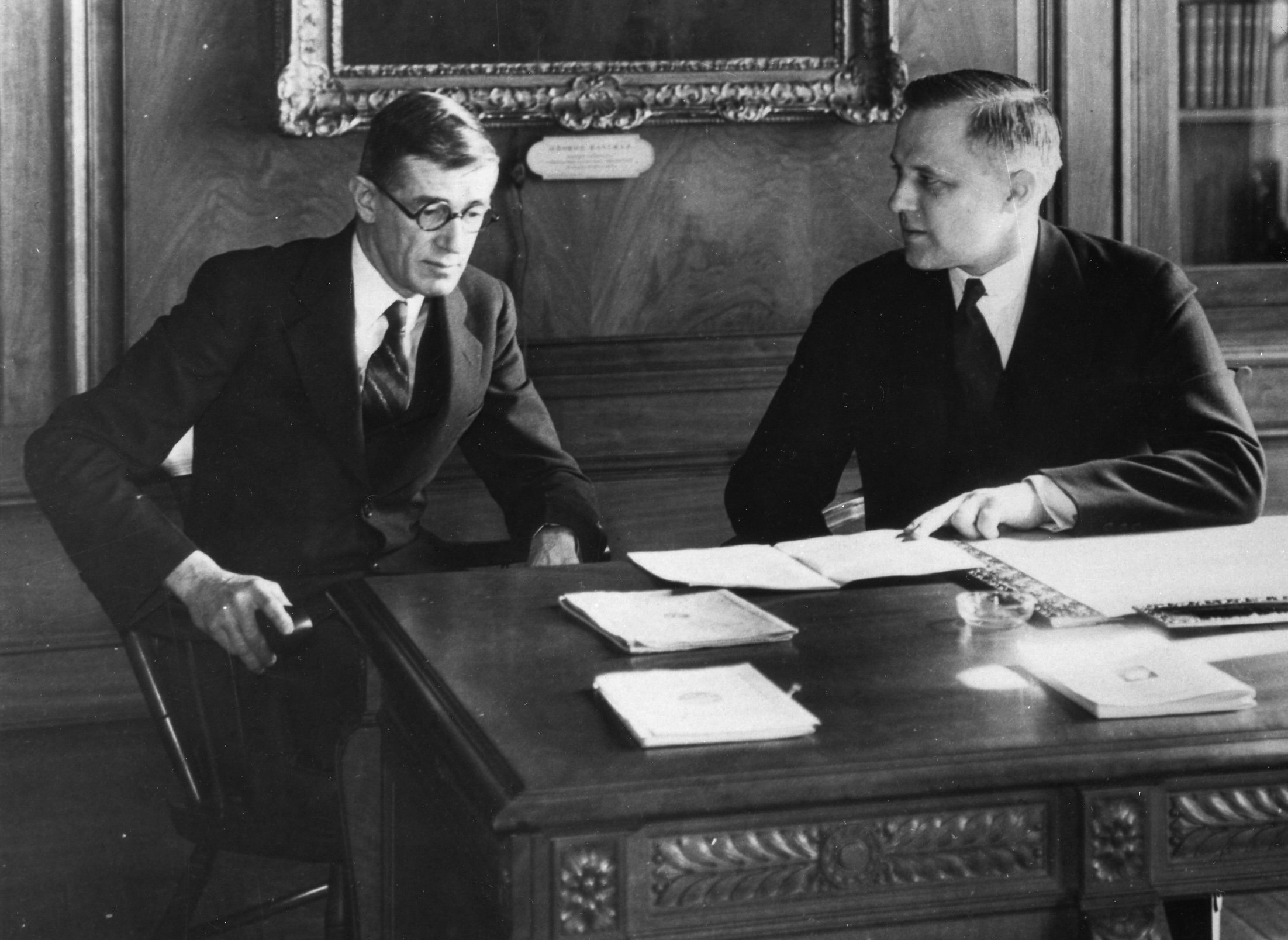
Compton appoints Bush as vice president, 1932

After the October 1931 death of his predecessor, Samuel Stratton, Compton revived the dormant office of vice president, a role equivalent to provost. Bush suggested himself for the job. Compton saw their opposite temperaments as complementary, and Bush was made vice president and dean of engineering in May 1932. One colleague described the partnership as a balance of contrasts: Compton was diplomatic and inclined to give everyone the benefit of the doubt, while Bush had shrewd judgment and did not mind making enemies. They divided responsibilities, with Compton overseeing the science departments, foundations, and government relations, and Bush running the engineering school and handling patent matters.

At the same time, Compton moved to reorganize the Institute's administration. He proposed grouping MIT's departments into three degree-granting schools: Engineering, Science, and Architecture, alongside a Division of Industrial Cooperation and a Humanities division. A Graduate School dean would oversee admissions and degree requirements without direct curricular authority. An administrative council of the president, vice president, deans, and directors would meet weekly. The intent, as Compton framed it, was to bring science and architecture into parity with engineering, helping define "a fine university...in which a great engineering school is one important part, but not the whole."

Compton sought to expand MIT's research funding beyond industrial contracts. He persuaded the Rockefeller Foundation, in a significant departure from its standard policy, to provide MIT a general research fund of $170,000; total annual foundation support nearly tripled from $37,000 in fiscal year 1936 to $111,000 by 1939. In engineering, he appointed research-oriented faculty to department chairs, and in 1938 recommended to Swope the elimination of Mining Engineering, Electrochemical Engineering, and Sanitary Engineering as programs he considered obsolete.

=== Industry relationships ===
Compton and Bush moved to centralize MIT's relationship with industry. The Division of Industrial Cooperation and Research, which had coordinated industrially sponsored work since 1920, was renamed the Division of Industrial Cooperation in 1932 and placed under presidential authority. Where department heads had previously negotiated contracts with sponsors and notified the administration only afterward, every research agreement now required approval at the top.

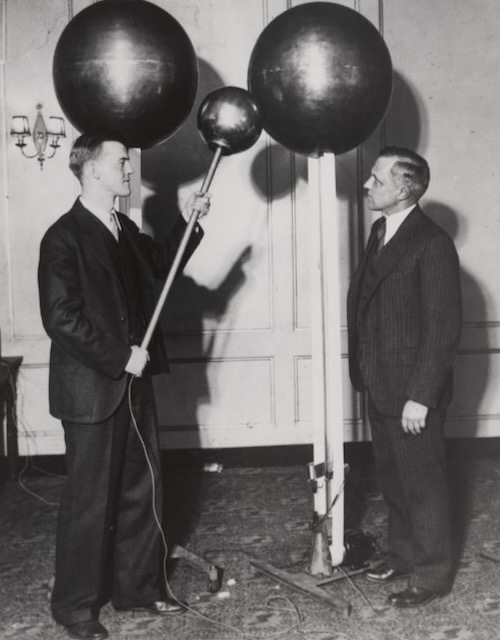
Van de Graaff's generator became a basis for patent licensing

Compton and Bush also established MIT as one of the first major universities to engage in patent licensing. The Corporation endorsed a formal patent policy in 1932, over the objections of industrial members who considered it improper for an educational institution to hold patents. A patent committee was created in 1933, and in 1937 an agreement with the Research Corporation transferred patent administration to an outside body, shielding MIT from accusations of competing with industry. Swope himself had opposed the patent policy, a sign that Compton was willing to act against the interests of those who had helped recruit him. When General Electric sought exclusive licensing rights to Robert Van de Graaff's high-voltage generator as a condition of further collaboration, Compton refused.

The Professors' Fund was abandoned within a few years, undone by faculty opposition. Compton regarded it as having established the principle that the faculty's first obligation was to the Institute. Separately, in the fall of 1932, as the Depression deepened, Compton announced a salary reserve plan withholding 10 percent of each professor's salary above $500 and depositing it into an emergency pool. When conditions improved, the withheld funds were returned intact.

By the mid-1930s, Compton's reforms were visible enough that MIT was invited to join the Association of American Universities, whose membership represented the leading research universities in the country. Graduate enrollment grew substantially and the ratio of research to teaching activity had shifted measurably. However, by the end of the decade, roughly 80 percent of MIT students were enrolled in the engineering school, and MIT's close relationship with industry persisted.

=== Advocacy for science funding ===
During the Depression, industries shed workers and the Technocracy movement blamed scientific progress for unemployment. Compton put forth a counterargument: that science, rather than displacing labor, generated new industries and new employment. In a 1933 essay rebutting the Technocrats, he argued that if civilization were destroyed, the fault would lie in human stubbornness rather than in human-made machines. Writing in The New York Times Magazine in December 1934, he put the argument in terms that would circulate for years: new industries, he wrote, were "like babies: they need shelter and nourishment, which they take in the form of patent protection, financing, and the chance of reasonable profits. But, before all, they need to be born, and their parents are science and invention." Throughout the mid-1930s he maintained an output of public addresses and essays in Vital Speeches of the Day, The Atlantic, and Science, consistently framing research expenditure as investment rather than a luxury.

Compton also worked to organize American science for advocacy. In 1931, he helped found the American Institute of Physics and served as chairman of its governing board until 1936. The AIP originated as an attempt to reduce publishing costs by centralizing the editorial operations of several physics societies. It quickly became "a trade association in defense of science and all its works," bringing the separate societies into a federation that spoke collectively for the discipline.

In July 1933, President Roosevelt created the Science Advisory Board by executive order, on the initiative of the geographer Isaiah Bowman and with the backing of Agriculture Secretary Henry Wallace. Roosevelt appointed Compton chairman. The Board received no federal funds even for its own operating expenses and was given a two-year life, but Compton set to work on a substantive program. By December 1934 he had brought the Board to endorse a proposal to the President: $75 million over five years for research, primarily in universities, and a permanent scientific advisory body to assist the Bureau of the Budget in reviewing the programs of government technical agencies. The proposal insisted that the distribution of funds be insulated from political interference; only the scientific merit of projects should govern the allocations.

This placed Compton in conflict with New Deal planners who wanted any research program tied to the social sciences and, ultimately, to immediate relief work. Harold Ickes forwarded the proposal to the National Resources Board. Its members—Wesley Mitchell, Charles Merriam, and Roosevelt's uncle Frederic Delano—believed the country's social and economic problems took priority over technological investment, and they found Compton's scale of request "staggering". When President Roosevelt conditioned any science appropriation on ninety percent of the spending going to workers drawn from relief rolls, the program was effectively blocked. The Board dissolved on schedule in 1935. Compton, by his own account, felt like a man who had bet on the wrong horse. The proposal itself was not forgotten: Compton's plan for a government science fund, administered by scientists and insulated from political control of programmatic purpose, reappeared a decade later in Vannevar Bush's Science, The Endless Frontier, the report widely credited as the founding document of the National Science Foundation.

=== New England and venture capital ===
With federal advocacy stymied, Compton turned to a regional strategy after 1936. New England's textile industry was in structural decline, and within the New England Council there was growing recognition that the universities and research laboratories concentrated around Boston represented an asset few other regions could match. In 1939, at Compton's suggestion, the Council formed a New Products Committee to examine how science might compensate for the region's manufacturing losses. The committee brought together Compton, the Harvard Business School professor Georges Doriot, the Vermont manufacturer Ralph Flanders, and the investment trust president Merrill Griswold. Its November 1940 annual meeting concluded that while capital for new ventures existed, what was lacking was an organization to evaluate technical opportunities rigorously for investors. It envisioned a professional venture capital fund, an idea Compton and his colleagues would return to after the war.

A parallel experiment, Enterprise Associates, took a more direct approach, pooling $300,000 from private stockholders to finance promising research projects. When Germany's invasion of France in May 1940 prompted most participants to withdraw from the group's first commitment, the episode exposed a structural problem: an organization that raised money for individual projects was hostage to events outside its control. Compton and Griswold concluded that any workable venture firm would need its own capital. The war interrupted these efforts before they could be resolved, but Compton would reconvene the initiative in 1946.

=== Health ===
Although he appeared robust, Compton's commitments strained him. He had arrived at MIT in 1930 nursing a stomach ulcer, managed by an easygoing disposition and a regimen of midmorning milk. In 1936, after the peak stress of the Depression-era reforms and the Science Advisory Board struggle, he suffered what appeared to be a mild stroke. His doctors traced the episodes to arterial hardening worsened by cigar smoking, a habit he had acquired in Paris during the First World War. Friends grew accustomed to watching him repeatedly swear off cigars.

In the fall of 1937, Vannevar Bush proposed that they should both find country retreats where their families could spend weekends away from Cambridge. Bush drew a circle on a map around Boston, calculated distances and prices, and turned up a house near Jaffrey Center, New Hampshire. Compton bought it within two weeks, and the family used it as a weekend escape through the war years.

== World War II ==
=== NDRC radar research ===
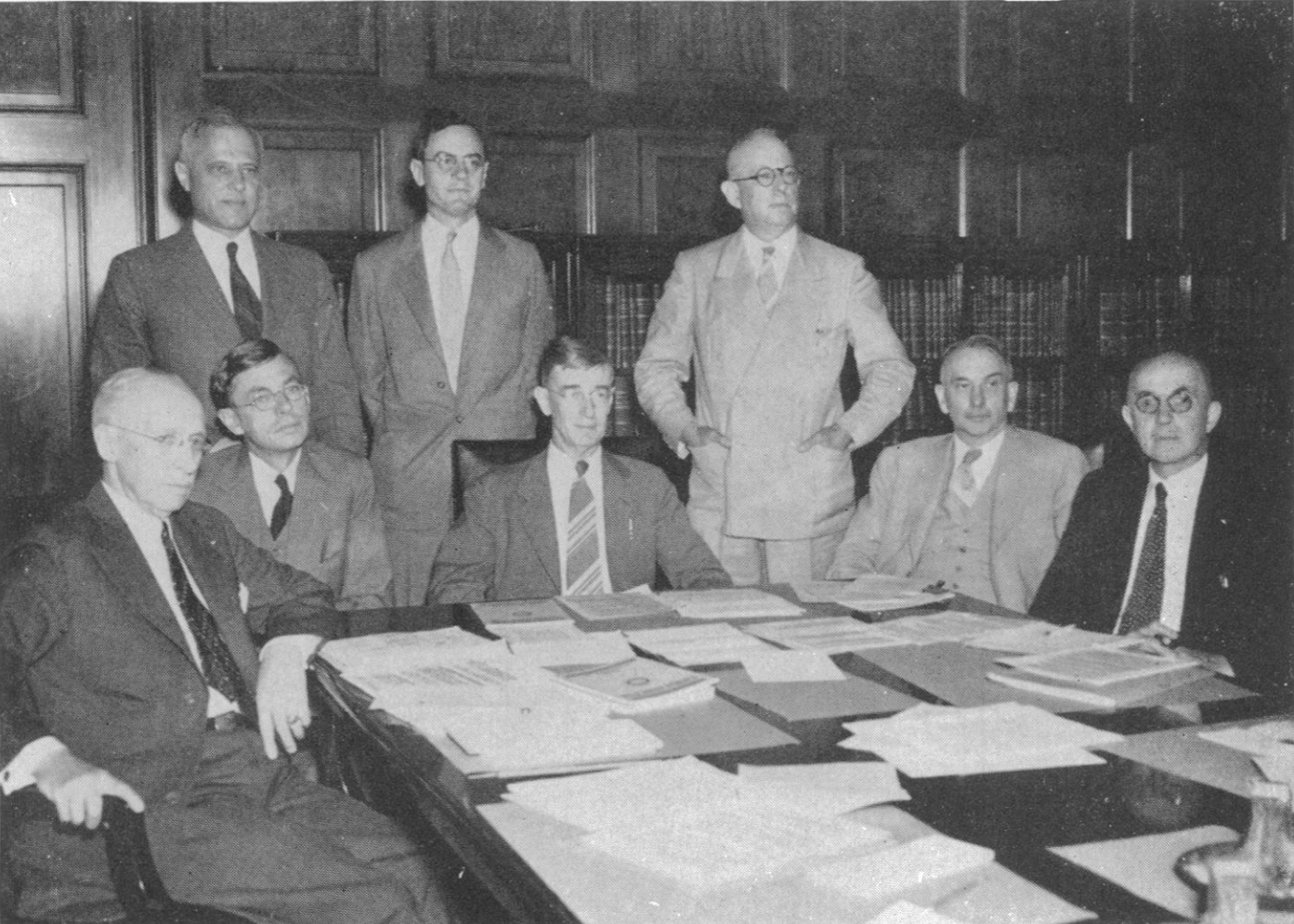
Compton, Bush, and others at the first NDRC meeting

When Vannevar Bush organized the National Defense Research Committee (NDRC) in June 1940 to mobilize university scientists for defense research, Compton was among its founding members. He headed Division D, which covered instruments, controls, and radar. That September, a British technical delegation led by Sir Henry Tizard arrived in the United States carrying a resonant-cavity magnetron. The compact device could generate microwave pulses at wattages one thousand times greater than American equivalents, making high-resolution radar practical for the first time. Loomis, Compton, and Bush were unanimous that a dedicated civilian laboratory should be built around it. When two prospective sites fell through, Bush turned to Compton with the request that MIT accommodate the work. Compton ultimately agreed after some hesitance, and the MIT Radiation Laboratory was organized on the MIT campus in late 1940. The original NDRC contract, for $455,000, was the first large wartime research contract placed with an American university.

The Radiation Laboratory's survival was not assured. When the lab's early airborne interception prototype failed to meet Army specifications in spring 1941, its future looked uncertain. Compton quietly secured an anonymous commitment from John D. Rockefeller Jr. to cover technical staff salaries through June 1942, keeping the enterprise afloat. The laboratory grew rapidly thereafter. By 1944, it employed nearly 4,000 physicists, engineers, and technicians. By the war's end, it had developed 150 distinct radar systems. Over the same period MIT received nearly 400 war research contracts worth $93 million, and federal funding to the Institute rose from $42,000 in fiscal year 1940 to nearly $38 million in 1944. MIT also ran a radar school that trained nearly 8,900 officers, enlisted men, and civilians. Lee DuBridge, the Radiation Laboratory's director, later wrote that Compton's leadership had been a "vital factor" in the Laboratory's operation and success.

When the NDRC was absorbed into the newly created Office of Scientific Research and Development (OSRD) in 1941, Compton continued as both an OSRD member and chairman of a radar research and development subcommittee under the Pentagon's Joint Committee on New Weapons and Equipment. In August 1942, Roosevelt appointed him to the Rubber Survey Committee alongside Bernard Baruch and James Conant, which investigated technical disputes in the development of synthetic rubber following the loss of supply routes through Southeast Asia.

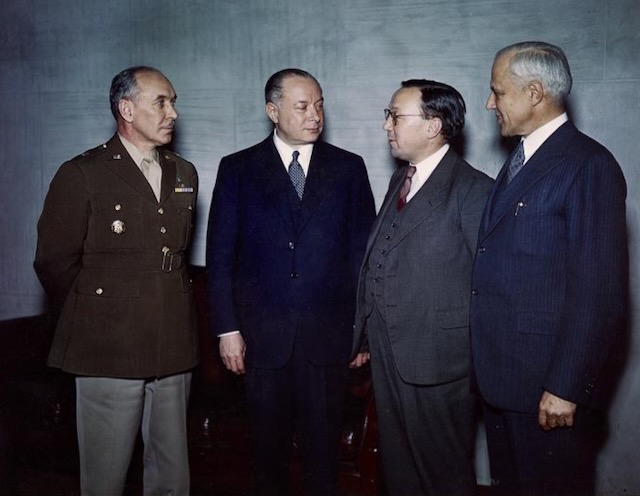
Compton hosting Robert Watson-Watt of the Telecommunications Research Establishment

In late April 1943, Compton led the United States Special Mission on Radar to Britain, with DuBridge traveling at his side. Over the following month, the mission visited British radar research establishments and operational commands, including the Telecommunications Research Establishment. The two allies agreed that the United States should generally take the lead on longer-range development projects, such as one-centimeter radar, while each country continued to develop overall systems independently. The mission returned with a package of radar policy proposals that shaped the Rad Lab's agenda for the remainder of the war, including the acceleration of H_{2}X bombing radar for the Eighth Air Force. The following year, Compton chaired the committee that received a reciprocal British radar mission to the United States.

=== Office of Field Service and the Pacific ===
In October 1943, Bush established the Office of Field Service (OFS) within OSRD to deploy civilian scientists directly to combat theaters. He appointed Compton as its chief. The OFS filled a gap that wartime communications could not bridge: field commanders needed scientists present in forward areas to diagnose failures in new equipment, train troops in its use, and transmit operational problems back to laboratories at home.

Compton's first major assignment as OFS chief was a reconnaissance mission to the Pacific in December 1943. Traveling as an expert consultant to the Secretary of War—identified in his papers as equivalent in treatment to an Army colonel if captured—he conferred with Admiral Chester Nimitz, General Douglas MacArthur, and the senior commanders of all three major Pacific theaters over the course of thirty-two days. At the end of January 1944, he presented MacArthur with a summary of the scientific assistance OSRD could provide. MacArthur approved it immediately, saying it exceeded his expectations. Compton returned to Boston with notebooks full of requests and began assembling teams of specialists.

Compton traveled to Manila, bearing the assimilated rank of Major General, to organize and head the OSRD Pacific Branch. He arrived on August 5, 1945, one day before the first bomb fell on Hiroshima. The branch had been resourced for laboratory space, 300 short tons (270,000 kg) of equipment, and some 200 scientists. Japan accepted the Potsdam terms on August 14, dissolving in days the invasion he had been preparing to support.

Compton and Edward L. Moreland were then asked to lead a scientific intelligence mission into Tokyo, entering the city among the first Americans to do so since the war began. Their team—drawn partly from Radiation Laboratory staff and using alumni lists of MIT, Caltech, Harvard, Chicago, and Berkeley to locate Japanese contacts—interviewed military officers and scientists on Japan's atomic and radar programs. Compton wrote that Japanese physicists had miscalculated the feasibility of a bomb and redirected their atomic effort toward power generation, and that the laboratory apparatus built for that purpose had been destroyed in a bombing raid before any tests were made. Japan's radar program, in his estimate, lagged approximately three years behind American practice in conception and further still in production.

Before leaving, Compton negotiated an agreement that Japanese cyclotrons would be preserved for medical research rather than destroyed. On returning home, he learned the War Department had dumped them into the ocean. Compton wrote Secretary of War Robert Patterson a letter condemning what he called an act of "utter stupidity."

=== The Interim Committee and the atomic bomb ===
In spring 1945, Secretary of War Henry Stimson assembled the Interim Committee to advise President Harry Truman on the use of the atomic bomb. Compton served as one of its scientific members alongside Bush and Harvard president James Conant. At the advisory level closest to Stimson, the three had joined in recommending that the bomb be used without warning against a military target in a populated area—a position that differed from the Franck Report, signed by Manhattan Project scientists in Chicago, which urged a prior demonstration.

These observations, combined with what he had learned in Tokyo, underpinned an article Compton published in the December 1946 Atlantic Monthly, "If the Atomic Bomb Had Not Been Used." Compton wrote the piece at the urging of Harvard president James B. Conant, who was seeking prominent voices to publicly defend the bombing decision. Drawing on his interviews with Japanese officers and his knowledge of the invasion planning, Compton argued that the bomb had strengthened the position of peace advocates within the Japanese government and precipitated a surrender that conventional operations alone could not have forced. When Compton sent Truman the published article, the president replied in a letter calling it "the first sensible statement I have seen on the subject." The Atlantic published a portion of Truman's letter in its February 1947 issue.

== Post-presidency ==
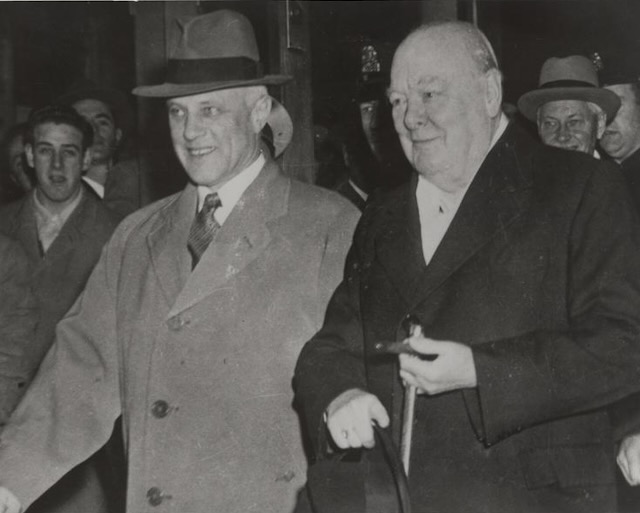
Compton with Winston Churchill at the 1949 MIT Midcentury Convocation

Compton resigned the MIT presidency in October 1948 and was immediately elected chairman of the MIT Corporation, a position he held until his death on June 22, 1954. His final years did not mark a withdrawal from public life. Beyond MIT, he served as a trustee of the Ford, Rockefeller, and Sloan Foundations, the Sloan-Kettering Institute, the Brookings Institution, and Princeton University. He remained an active participant in the ventures he had helped create, though a series of cardiovascular episodes forced a partial retreat in 1949.

=== Organization of venture capital ===
Compton had sustained his prewar conviction that New England's economic recovery depended on channeling scientific research into new commercial enterprises and his diagnosis the region was missing a professionally managed pool of risk capital. Following Japan's surrender, Compton reconvened his colleagues from the New Products Committee. ARD was incorporated on June 6, 1946, with Ralph Flanders serving as its interim president until Georges Doriot could be discharged from military service. By December, ARD had raised $3.5 million from nine financial institutions, two insurance companies, and four university endowments: MIT, Rice Institute, the University of Pennsylvania, and the University of Rochester. Individual investors supplied the remainder. Compton's idea became an industry model: ARD was the first venture firm to draw on institutional capital rather than family wealth.

Compton served on ARD's three-member MIT technical advisory board alongside chemical engineering professor Edwin Gilliland and aeronautics department head Jerome Hunsaker, and joined the board of Tracerlab, one of ARD's first technology investments. Founded by MIT graduates to sell radioactive isotopes and manufacture radiation detection equipment, Tracerlab been near bankruptcy before ARD provided $150,000 on terms that commercial lenders had refused. He also joined the board of High Voltage Engineering Corporation (HVEC), a second ARD-backed startup founded by MIT scientists Robert Van de Graaff and John Trump. Articulating the founders' hope of using compact electrostatic accelerators for cancer radiotherapy, Compton urged Doriot to back HVEC despite its uncertain commercial prospects, arguing that the humanitarian value of affordable cancer treatment justified a risky investment. Doriot provided $150,000 and both took seats on the HVEC board. On Compton's death in 1954, Doriot wrote to ARD stockholders that his foresight and vision were responsible in great part for the formation of the corporation, and that Tracerlab and HVEC in particular would miss his counsel.

=== Universal military training ===
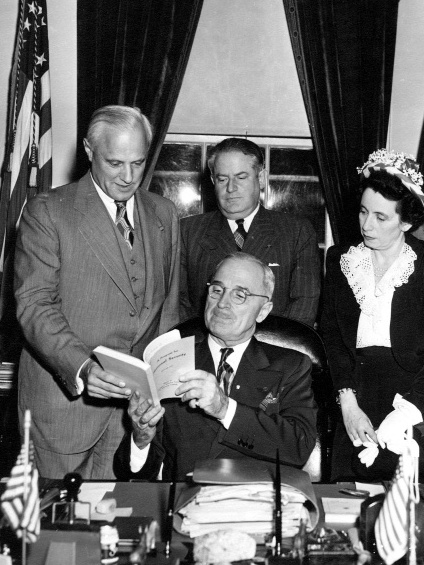
Compton handing Truman a plan for universal military training

On December 19, 1946, President Truman named the members of a new President's Advisory Commission on Universal Training and appointed Compton its chairman. The commission was charged with studying whether the United States should adopt peacetime conscription. Compton brought unusual preparation to the role: his wartime service had spanned the NDRC, the OSRD, the Interim Committee, and the Pacific theater, and he had come to believe that a trained reserve was the indispensable complement to the technological superiority he had spent his career building. The commission completed its work in five months. The committee submitted its report, A Program for National Security, to Truman on May 29, 1947, unanimously recommending universal training. Congress held hearings the following year and declined to act, enacting instead a renewed selective service law that deferred military training entirely. James Killian later wrote that Compton's disappointment was deep, and that the congressional rejection foreshadowed a growing unwillingness among Americans to sustain the commitments that postwar security required.

When Congress created the National Security Training Commission in 1951, Truman nominated Compton as one of its civilian members. The commission produced further reports in 1951 and 1952, but none resulted in enacted legislation during Compton's lifetime.

=== Research and Development Board ===
When Vannevar Bush stepped down as chairman of the Research and Development Board of the National Military Establishment in 1948, he recommended Compton as a successor with sufficient standing to make the board function. The National Security Act of 1947 established the board to coordinate research across the Army, Navy, and Air Force under a civilian chairman, a peacetime successor to OSRD intended to preserve a civilian voice in defense policy. Truman appointed Compton in October 1948, the same month Compton relinquished the MIT presidency.

The assignment proved punishing. The newly unified Department of Defense was beset by interservice rivalries and budget conflicts, and Compton found himself trying to build a coordinating structure across services that resisted civilian direction. He developed severe headaches—briefly and incorrectly diagnosed as a brain tumor—and was hospitalized with chest pains. In August 1949, a stroke at a Washington luncheon temporarily paralyzed his throat. On November 2, he wrote his resignation to Truman and returned to Cambridge.

== Death and legacy ==
Compton suffered a heart attack in June 1954 while attending a meeting in New York. Six days later, on June 22, a blood clot ended his life at the age of 66. He was survived by three children from two marriages and several grandchildren. At a memorial service held in MIT's Great Court, the Reverend Theodore Ferris described him as a man "with one eye continually and honestly on the facts and the other on the stars."

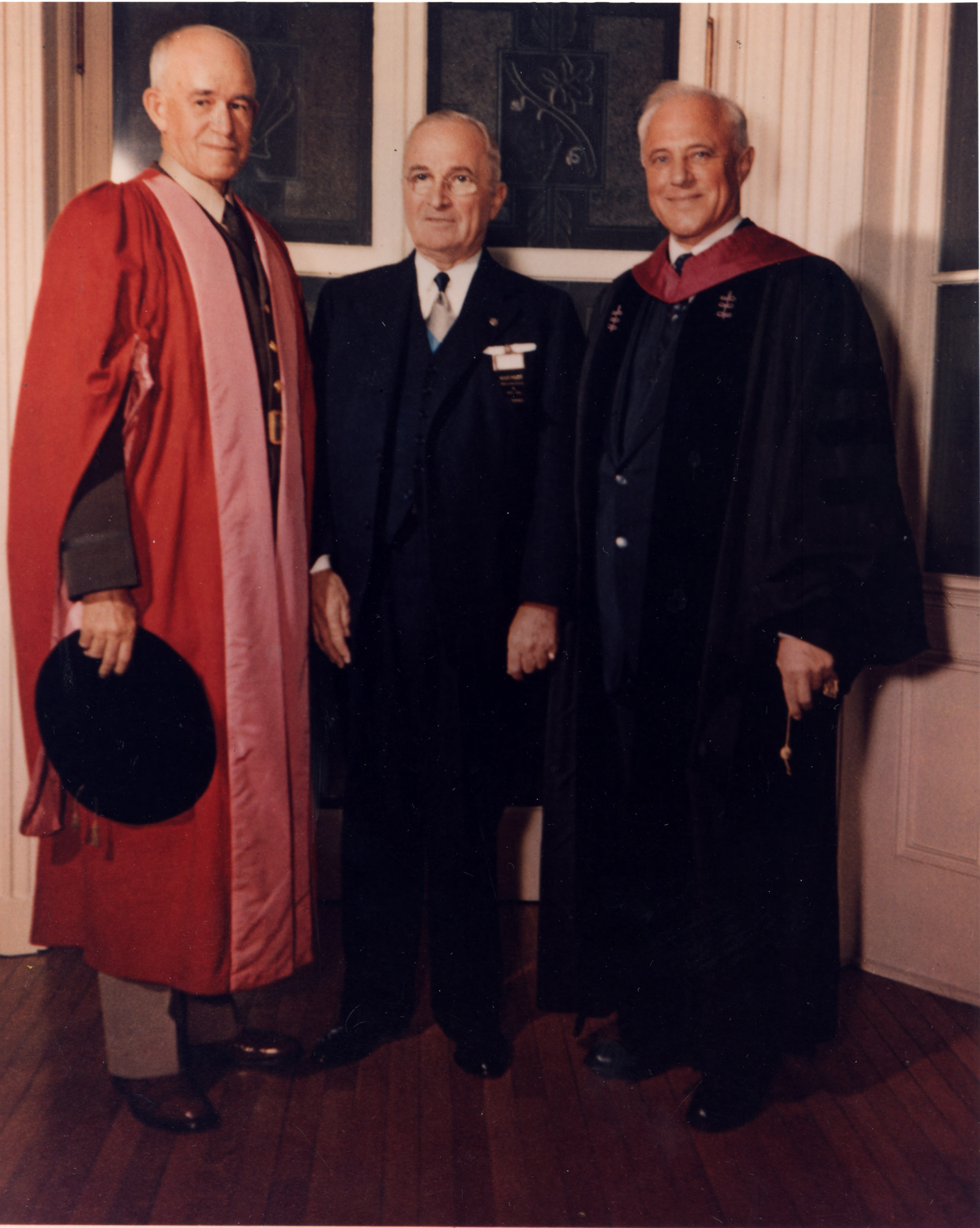
Compton at the 1952 United States Military Academy graduation with Truman and General Omar Bradley

Compton's most lasting achievement was the transformation of MIT from an engineering school into a research university strong in basic science, a process he set in motion in 1930 and that his wartime and postwar successors built upon. During his presidency, the educational model he developed—coupling fundamental research with advanced graduate training, encouraging faculty to bring discoveries into commercial use—was widely imitated. His advocacy for federal support of university research, pursued through the Science Advisory Board, the NDRC, and his many public addresses, helped establish the framework of government-university partnership that became characteristic of postwar American science.

Over his career he received thirty-two honorary degrees and numerous awards, among them the Presidential Medal for Merit (1946), the Public Welfare Medal of the National Academy of Sciences (1947), the Hoover Medal (1950), and honorary commander of the Order of the British Empire. He was promoted to officer in the French Legion of Honor in 1951.

The venture capital firm he co-founded, American Research and Development Corporation, provided $70,000 in seed funding to two MIT engineers in 1957 to start the Digital Equipment Corporation, an investment that eventually returned more than 70,000 percent and helped make the Route 128 corridor a center of the technology industry.

The Compton lunar crater is named jointly for Karl and his brother Arthur.

== Awards and honors ==
- Rumford Prize of the American Academy of Arts and Sciences (1931)
- The Presidential Medal for Merit (1946) for hastening the termination of hostilities by means of the radar research and development program he directed.
- The Public Welfare Medal (1947) from the National Academy of Sciences for his "eminent service in the wartime research effort of the nation, and in the reinforcing of collaboration and understanding between civilian scientists and military men."
- The Washington Award of the Western Society of Engineers (1947)
- Honorary Commander, Civil Division, of the Most Excellent Order of the British Empire (1948)
- Knight Commander of the Royal Norwegian Order of St. Olav (1948)
- The Lamme Medal of the American Society for Engineering Education (1949)
- The Hoover Medal (1950) was jointly awarded from American engineering societies
- The William Procter Prize for Scientific Achievement of the Scientific Research Society of America (1950)
- Officer in the French Legion of Honor (1951)
- The "Priestley Memorial Award" (1954) of Dickinson College for his contributions to the "welfare of mankind through physics"

== Publications ==
Compton published nearly 400 works between 1910 and 1954. His early career produced over 100 papers in experimental physics, primarily on electron behavior in gases, photoelectricity, and spectroscopy. In 1930, when he became president of MIT, his efforts were redirected toward science policy, engineering education, and the promotion of research funding.

=== Journal articles ===
- Compton, K. T. (1910). "A Study of the Wehnelt Electrolytic Interrupter". Physical Review. Series I. 30 (2): 161–179. doi:10.1103/PhysRevSeriesI.30.161.
- Richardson, O. W.; Compton, Karl T. (1912). "The Photoelectric Effect". Philosophical Magazine. 6th series. 24 (142): 575–594. doi:10.1080/14786441008637361.
- Compton, K. T. (1916). "The Theory of Ionization by Collision. I. The Distribution of Velocities of the Electrons". Physical Review. 7 (4): 489–496. doi:10.1103/PhysRev.7.489.
  - —— (1916). "II. Case of Inelastic Impact". Physical Review. 7 (5): 501–508. doi:10.1103/PhysRev.7.501.
  - —— (1916). "III. Case of Elastic Impact". Physical Review. 7 (5): 509–517. doi:10.1103/PhysRev.7.509.
- Compton, A. H.; Compton, K. T. (1919). "A Sensitive Modification of the Quadrant Electrometer: Its Theory and Use". Physical Review. 14 (2): 85–98. doi:10.1103/PhysRev.14.85.
- Compton, K. T. (1922). "Theory of Ionization by Cumulative Action and the Low Voltage Arc". Physical Review. 20 (4): 283–299. doi:10.1103/PhysRev.20.283.
- —— (1923). "On the Motions of Electrons in Gases". Physical Review. 22 (4): 333–346. doi:10.1103/PhysRev.22.333.
- —— (1923). "Mobilities of Electrons in Gases". Physical Review. 22 (5): 432–444. doi:10.1103/PhysRev.22.432.
- Compton, Karl T.; Langmuir, Irving (1930). "Electrical Discharges in Gases. Part I. Survey of Fundamental Processes". Reviews of Modern Physics. 2 (2): 123–242. doi:10.1103/RevModPhys.2.123.
  - —— —— (1931). "Part II. Fundamental Phenomena in Electrical Discharges". Reviews of Modern Physics. 3 (2): 191–257. doi:10.1103/RevModPhys.3.191.
- —— (1931). "On the Theory of the Mercury Arc". Physical Review. 37 (9): 1077–1090. doi:10.1103/PhysRev.37.1077.

=== Essays ===
- Compton, Karl T. (1934a). "Science Makes Jobs". Scientific Monthly. 39: 297–302.
- – – (December 16, 1934). "Science Still Holds a Great Promise". New York Times Magazine.
- – – (January 1935). "Put Science to Work!". Technology Review. Vol. 37. pp. 131–134, 160.
- – – (February 1937). "The Electron: Its Intellectual And Social Significance". Nature. 139: 229–240. doi:10.1038/139229a0.
- – – (December 1945). "Mission to Tokyo". Technology Review. Vol. 48. pp. 99–102, 114, 118, 120.
- – – (December 1946). "If the Atomic Bomb Had Not Been Used". The Atlantic. pp. 54–56.

=== Reports ===
- Baruch, Bernard M.; Conant, James B.; Compton, Karl T. (September 10, 1942). Report of the Rubber Survey Committee (Report). Washington, D.C.: Government Printing Office.
- President's Advisory Commission on Universal Training (May 29, 1947). A Program for National Security (Report). Washington, D.C.: Government Printing Office.

== Bibliography ==
- Alexander, Philip N (2011). "'All Knowledge His Sphere': Karl Taylor Compton (1887–1954)". A Widening Sphere: Evolving Cultures at MIT. MIT Press. pp. 355–429. doi:10.7551/mitpress/8361.003.0011.
- Ante, Spencer E. (2008). Creative Capital: Georges Doriot and the Birth of Venture Capital. Cambridge, MA: Harvard Business School Press. ISBN 978-1-4221-0122-3.
- Bernstein, Barton J. (1993). "Seizing the Contested Terrain of Early Nuclear History: Stimson, Conant, and Their Allies Explain the Decision to Use the Atomic Bomb". Diplomatic History. 17 (1): 35–72. doi:10.1111/j.1467-7709.1993.tb00160.x.
- Buderi, Robert (1996). The Invention That Changed the World: How a Small Group of Radar Pioneers Won the Second World War and Launched a Technical Revolution. London: Little, Brown. ISBN 9780316907156 – via Internet Archive.
- Douglas, Deborah (2010). "MIT and War". In Kaiser, David (ed.). Becoming MIT: Moments of Decision. MIT Press. pp. 81–102. JSTOR j.ctt5hhbpp.8.
- Geiger, Roger L. (1993). Research and Relevant Knowledge: American Research Universities Since World War II. Oxford University Press. ISBN 978-0-19-505346-3.
- Gompers, Paul A. (1994). "The Rise and Fall of Venture Capital" (PDF). Business and Economic History. 23 (2): 1–24.
- Kargon, Robert; Hodes, Elizabeth (1985). "Karl Compton, Isaiah Bowman, and the Politics of Science in the Great Depression". Isis. 76 (3): 300–318. doi:10.1086/353875.
- Kevles, Daniel (1995) [1978]. The Physicists: The History of a Scientific Community in Modern America (2nd ed.). Cambridge, MA: Harvard University Press – via Internet Archive.
- Killian, James R. Jr. (1985). The Education of a College President: A Memoir. Cambridge, MA: MIT Press.
- Lécuyer, Christophe (1992). "The Making of a Science Based Technological University: Karl Compton, James Killian, and the Reform of MIT, 1930–1957". Historical Studies in the Physical and Biological Sciences. 23 (1): 153–180. doi:10.2307/27757693. JSTOR 27757693.
- Patrick, Sue C. (1977). Universal Military Training and Public Policy (Master's thesis). Texas Tech University.
- Stratton, Julius A. (1992). "Karl Taylor Compton". Biographical Memoirs (PDF). Vol. 61. National Academy of Sciences. pp. 39–57. ISBN 978-0-309-04746-3.
- Thiesmeyer, Lincoln R.; Burchard, John E. (1947). Waterman, Alan T. (ed.). Combat Scientists. Boston: Little, Brown.

Academic offices
Preceded by Samuel Stratton	President of the Massachusetts Institute of Technology; 1930–1948	Succeeded by James Killian
Government offices
Preceded by Vannevar Bush	9th Chair of the Research and Development Board; 1948–1950	Succeeded by William Webster
