= Wilson Martindale Compton =

American academic administrator (1890–1967)

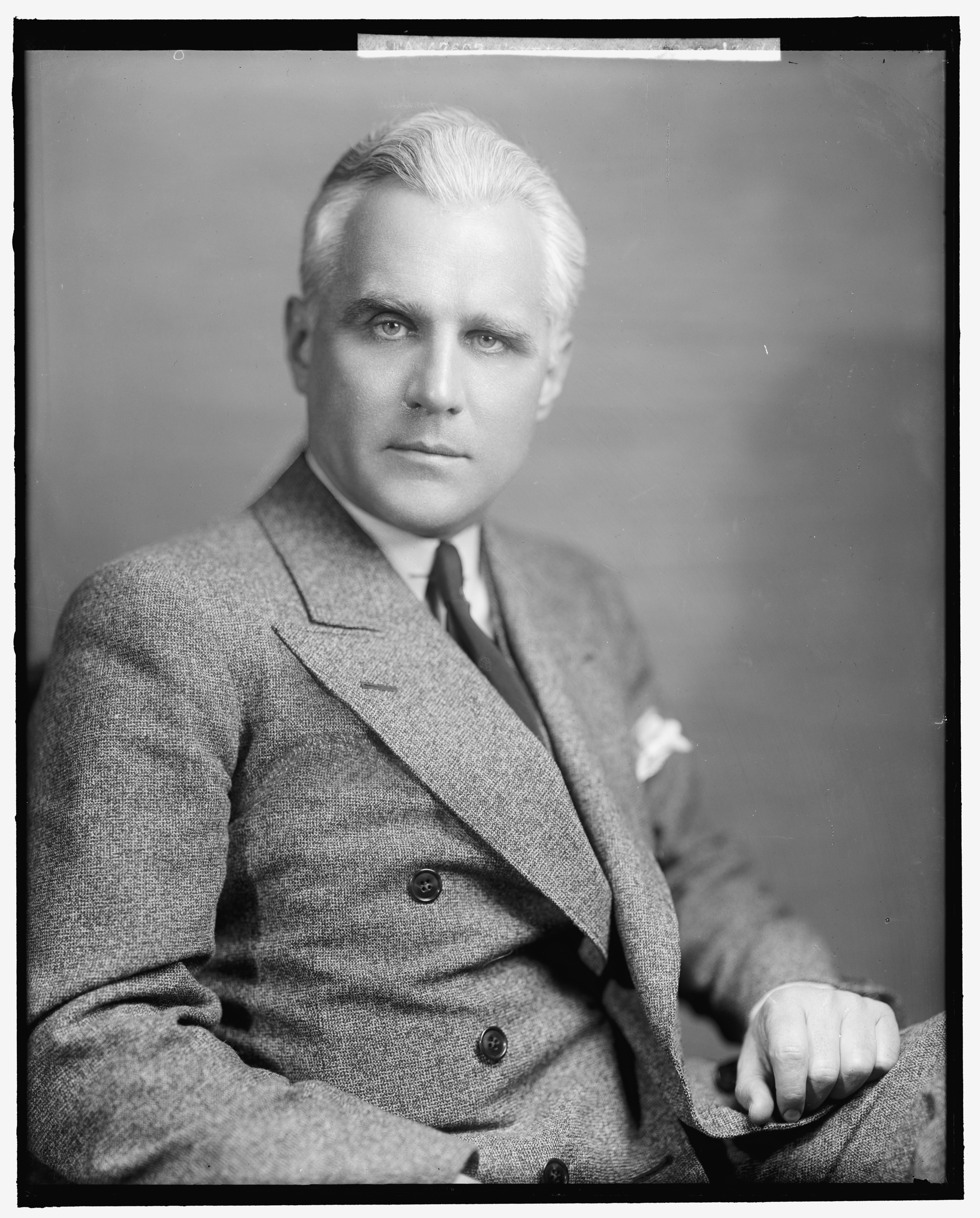
- Born: October 15, 1890; Wooster, Ohio, United States
- Died: March 7, 1967 (aged 76); United States
- Education: Princeton University
- Occupations: Trade association executive, college president
- Parent(s): Elias Compton; Otelia Augspurger Compton
- Relatives: Arthur Compton (brother); Karl Taylor Compton (brother); Mary Elesia Compton (sister)

Wilson Martindale Compton (October 15, 1890 – March 7, 1967) was a long-time trade association executive for the timber industry and also the fifth president of the State College of Washington, now Washington State University.

== Early life and education ==
Wilson M. Compton was born October 15, 1890, in Wooster, Ohio, the son of Elias Compton and Otelia Augspurger Compton. His father was a Presbyterian minister as well as dean and professor of philosophy at the College of Wooster. Wilson was the second of three brothers, the others being Karl Taylor Compton and Arthur Compton, both physicists and university presidents. All three brothers graduated from the College of Wooster and earned their Ph.D. degrees at Princeton University. Their sister was Mary Elesia Compton.

== Career ==
Wilson Compton earned his doctoral degree from the department of history, politics, and economics at Princeton University in 1915. He then taught economics for one year at Dartmouth College before going to work for the Federal Trade Commission. During this period, he wrote several papers on the economic challenges facing the nation's lumber industry. In 1918, the National Lumber Manufacturers Association, a trade group now merged into the American Forest and Paper Association, was reorganized and invited Compton to become its first secretary-manager. He held that post until 1944, building the organization into a prominent one with substantial power in the lumber industry.

Under the Oberlaender Trust of the Carl Schurz Memorial Foundation, Compton was part of the 1934 group of American lumberman who toured Germany, Austria, and Czechoslovakia to observe and study forest management in Europe.

On August 21, 1944, the Board of Regents of the State College of Washington, today Washington State University, named Wilson M. Compton as the college's fifth president, succeeding President Ernest O. Holland who retired after 28 years of service. Compton led the institution through a period of growth following World War II as military veterans used their GI Bill benefits to attend college. Under his leadership, many academic and administrative aspects of the college were modernized, and an Institute of Agricultural Sciences and an Institute of Technology were established to enhance services to the industries of Washington state. Major buildings added to serve the growing campus were the Todd Hall classroom building, Dana Hall engineering building, Holland Library, and the student union building that would carry Compton's name. In April 1951, in the midst of a state financial crisis, the Compton presidency ended. Between 1952 and 1953, Compton was Director of the International Information Administration (IIA), the forerunner of the United States Information Agency (USIA), within the Department of State.

WSU history professor George A. Frykman depicted the Compton presidency as "a brief but exciting era in which the institution moved rapidly toward university status" in his centennial history, "Creating the People's University: Washington State University, 1890-1990."

== Recognition ==
The Student Union Building at WSU, built during 1950-1952, was dedicated to President Wilson M. Compton at Homecoming in 1952, becoming the Compton Union Building or CUB.

On May 9, 1964, Princeton trustees named one of two Graduate College quadrangles the Compton Quadrangle, honoring the three Compton brothers: Karl who had served as president of Massachusetts Institute of Technology, Wilson who had been president of Washington State University and Arthur who been chancellor of Washington University in St. Louis.

== Family ==
On December 29, 1916, Wilson M. Compton married Helen Harrington, daughter of Newton Ross Harrington and Laura Belle Case. They had four children: Wilson M. Compton, Catherine Ross Compton, Ross Harrington Compton, and Helen Case Compton.
