= MIT School of Engineering =

School at the Massachusetts Institute of Technology

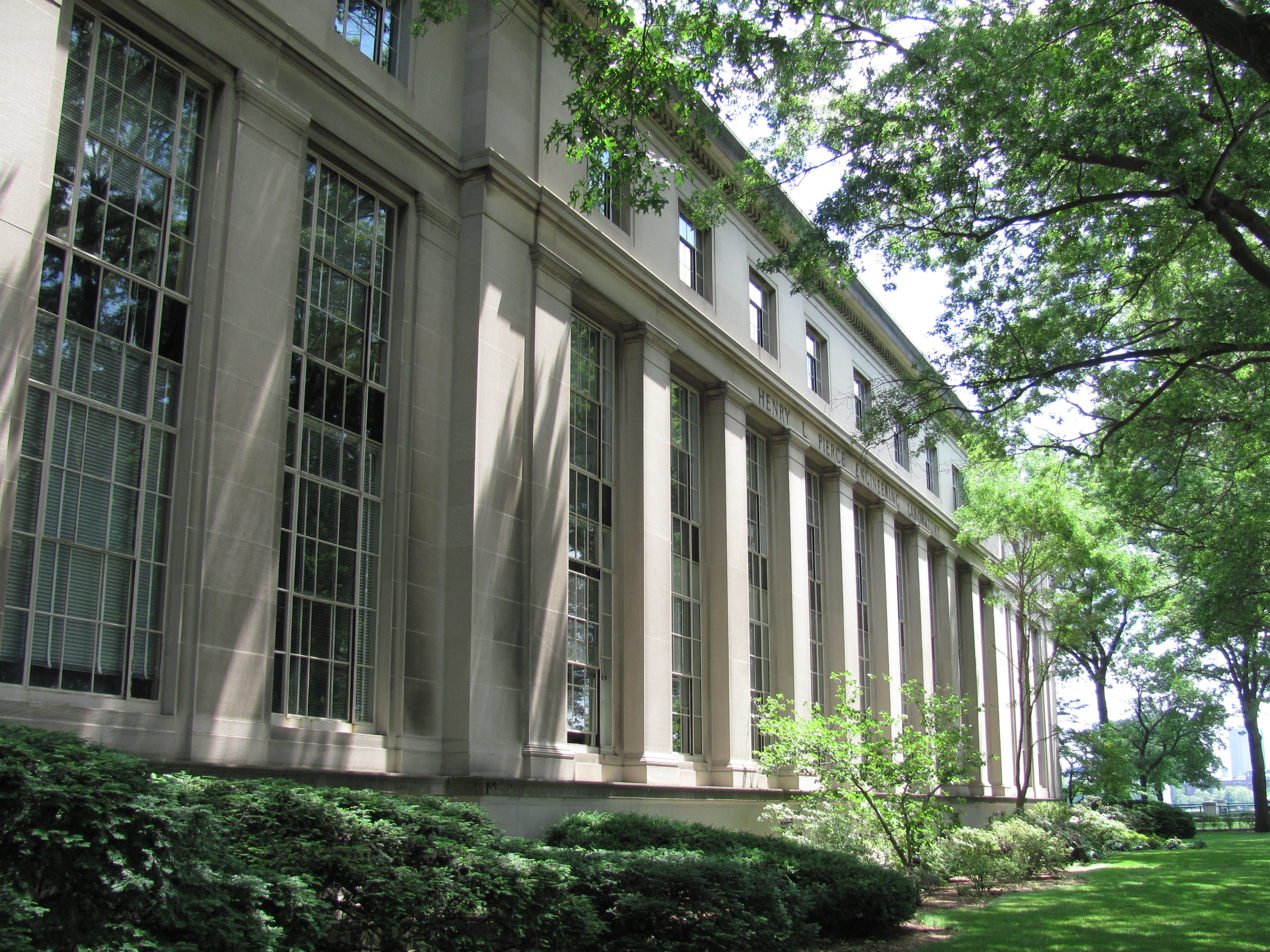
- MIT Building 1 Pierce Engineering Laboratory
- Established: 1932
- Dean: Paula T. Hammond
- Location: Cambridge, Massachusetts, United States; 42.35896°N 71.09244°W
- Website: engineering.mit.edu

The MIT School of Engineering (SoE) is one of the five schools of the Massachusetts Institute of Technology, located in Cambridge, Massachusetts, United States. It was established in 1932 as part of the reorganization of the Institute recommended by President Karl Taylor Compton. SoE has eight academic departments and two interdisciplinary institutes. The School grants SB, MEng, SM, engineer's degrees, and PhD or ScD degrees. As of 2026, the Dean of Engineering is Professor Paula T. Hammond. The school is the largest at MIT as measured by undergraduate and graduate enrollments and faculty members.

MIT's School of Engineering is the largest of the Institute's five schools. It enrolls roughly 70 percent of MIT's undergraduate majors and 45 percent of its graduate students. Although just over a third of the faculty belong to the school, they account for more than half of MIT's sponsored research.

== History ==
Beginning in 1932, MIT required a "redistribution of responsibilities" owing to the increasing administrative complexity of managing the various departments which had existed from the Institute's founding. As new president of MIT, Karl Taylor Compton established three schools as "administrative corrals for the departments."

Alongside the School of Science and the School of Architecture, the School of Engineering was organized, to be led by Vannevar Bush, who was made dean and vice-president of the Institute.

== Departments and institutes ==
The school includes eight departments:

- Aeronautics and Astronautics (Course 16) (Founded 1939)
- Biological Engineering (Course 20) (Founded 1998)
- Chemical Engineering (Course 10) (Founded 1920)
- Civil and Environmental Engineering (Course 1) (Founded 1865)
- Electrical Engineering and Computer Science (Course 6, joint department with MIT Schwarzman College of Computing) (Founded 1902)
- Materials Science and Engineering (Course 3) (Founded 1884)
- Mechanical Engineering (Course 2) (Founded 1883)
- Nuclear Science and Engineering (Course 22) (Founded 1958)

In addition, the following MIT institutes are within the school:

- Institute for Data, Systems & Society (Reports jointly to the Dean, MIT Schwarzman College of Computing)
- Institute for Medical Engineering and Science (includes the Harvard–MIT Program in Health Sciences and Technology)

Departments and degree programs are commonly referred to by course catalog numbers on campus.

== Interdisciplinary Graduate Programs ==
- Leaders for Global Operations Reports jointly to the dean, Sloan School of Management
- Program in Polymers and Soft Matter
- Supply Chain Management Based in the Center for Transportation and Logistics
- System Design and Management/Integrated Design and Management Reports jointly to the dean, Sloan School of Management

== Laboratories and research centers ==
The following labs and centers report to the Dean of Engineering:

- Center for Transportation and Logistics
- Deshpande Center for Technological Innovation
- MIT Lincoln Laboratory Beaver Works Center Reports jointly to the director, Lincoln Laboratory
- Microsystems Technology Laboratories Reports jointly to the vice president for research
- MIT Sociotechnical Systems Research Center

== Programs and Initiatives ==
- Lemelson-MIT Program
- MIT AI Hardware Program Reports jointly to the dean, MIT Stephen A. Schwarzman College of Computing
- MIT Climate and Sustainability Consortium
- MIT Introduction to Technology, Engineering, and Science (MITES)
- MIT Mobility Initiative Reports jointly to the dean, School of Architecture and Planning
- MIT Professional Education
- MIT Sandbox Innovation Fund Program
- MIT School of Engineering Postdoctoral Fellowship Program for Engineering Excellence
- MIT-Novo Nordisk Artificial Intelligence Postdoctoral Fellows Program Based in the MIT Health and Life Sciences Collaborative (MIT HEALS)
- MIT-Royalty Pharma Faculty Founder Initiative
- New Engineering Education Transformation (NEET)
- Program for Exemplary Mentoring
- Programs in Technical Leadership and Communication

== 2020 changes ==
The Computer Science and Artificial Intelligence Laboratory and the Laboratory for Information and Decision Systems were moved to the MIT Schwarzman College of Computing upon its creation, and the Department of Electrical Engineering and Computer Science and the Institute for Data, Systems and Society are now administered jointly.

== Ranking ==
In 2026, U.S. News and World Report designated MIT as the top school in its annual rankings of the nation’s best universities. MIT’s engineering program led the rankings of undergraduate engineering programs at a doctoral institution, and five engineering specialities placed first: aerospace/aeronautical/astronautical engineering; chemical engineering; electrical/electronic/communication engineering; materials engineering; and mechanical engineering.

== Former MIT Deans of Engineering ==
- Vannevar Bush 1931–1938
- Edward Leyburn Moreland 1938–1946
- Thomas Kilgore Sherwood 1946–1952
- Edward Lull Cochrane 1952–1954
- Richard Söderberg 1954–1959
- Gordon S. Brown 1959–1968
- Raymond L. Bisplinghoff 1968–1971
- Alfred H. Keil 1971–1977
- James D. Bruce 1977–1978 (Acting Dean)
- Robert Seamans 1978–1981
- Gerald L. Wilson 1981–1991
- Joel Moses 1991–1995
- Robert A. Brown 1996–1999
- Thomas L. Magnanti 1999–2007
- Subra Suresh 2007–2009
- Cynthia Barnhart 2009–2011 (Acting Dean)
- Ian A. Waitz 2011-2017
- Anantha P. Chandrakasan 2017-2025
- Maria C. Yang 2025-2026 (Acting Dean)
- Paula T. Hammond 2026-present
