= Daniel Huttenlocher =

American computer scientist

- Born: Daniel Peter Huttenlocher; 1959 (age 66–67)
- Education: University of Michigan (BA); Massachusetts Institute of Technology (MS, PhD)
- Occupation: Academic administrator
- Employer: Massachusetts Institute of Technology
- Known for: Inaugural Dean, MIT Schwarzman College of Computing; Inaugural Dean and Vice Provost, Cornell Tech (2012–2019)

Daniel Peter Huttenlocher is an American computer scientist, academic administrator and corporate director. He is the inaugural dean of the Schwarzman College of Computing at the Massachusetts Institute of Technology (MIT). Prior to this, he notably served as the inaugural dean of Cornell Tech at Cornell University, and as a member of Amazon's board of directors.

Much of Huttenlocher's research has centered on artificial intelligence (AI), and collaborated with former Secretary of State Henry Kissinger and former Google CEO Eric Schmidt on the book The Age of A.I. And Our Human Future (2021).

== Early life and education ==
Huttenlocher was born in 1959. Huttenlocher's father was a neurologist at the University of Chicago Medical School, and his mother was a professor of cognitive psychology at the University of Chicago.

He attended the University of Chicago Laboratory Schools and has an undergraduate degree from the University of Michigan. He earned his master's and doctorate (1988) degrees from MIT, the latter under Shimon Ullman.

== Career ==
Huttenlocher previously worked at the Xerox Palo Alto Research Center and was Chief Technology Officer at Intelligent Markets. He joined the department of computer science at Cornell in 1988, and he owned 24 patents in computer vision by 2015. Huttenlocher was the inaugural dean and vice provost of Cornell Tech at Cornell University. In 2016, he was named to the board of directors of Amazon.

In February 2019, he was named by MIT to be the head of its new Schwarzman College of Computing starting in August 2019.

=== The Age of A.I. And Our Human Future ===
In 2021, Huttenlocher co-authored The Age of AI. And Our Human Future alongside former Secretary of State Henry Kissinger and former Google CEO Eric Schmidt. The book argued that advances in artificial intelligence (AI) stood to result in widespread social changes across human society, and discussed whether humans were ready for such changes.

In 2023, Huttenlocher, Kissinger, and Schmidt reunited to author an op-ed in The Wall Street Journal, where they argued that advances in AI technologies could potentially be compared in importance to the invention of the printing press.

In 2024 he was awarded the title of Doctor honoris causa by EPFL.

== Books ==
- The Age of AI. And Our Human Future, with Henry A. Kissinger and Eric Schmidt, Little, Brown and Company, New York, 2021
