= Compton generator =

Physics apparatus to demonstrate rotation of Earth

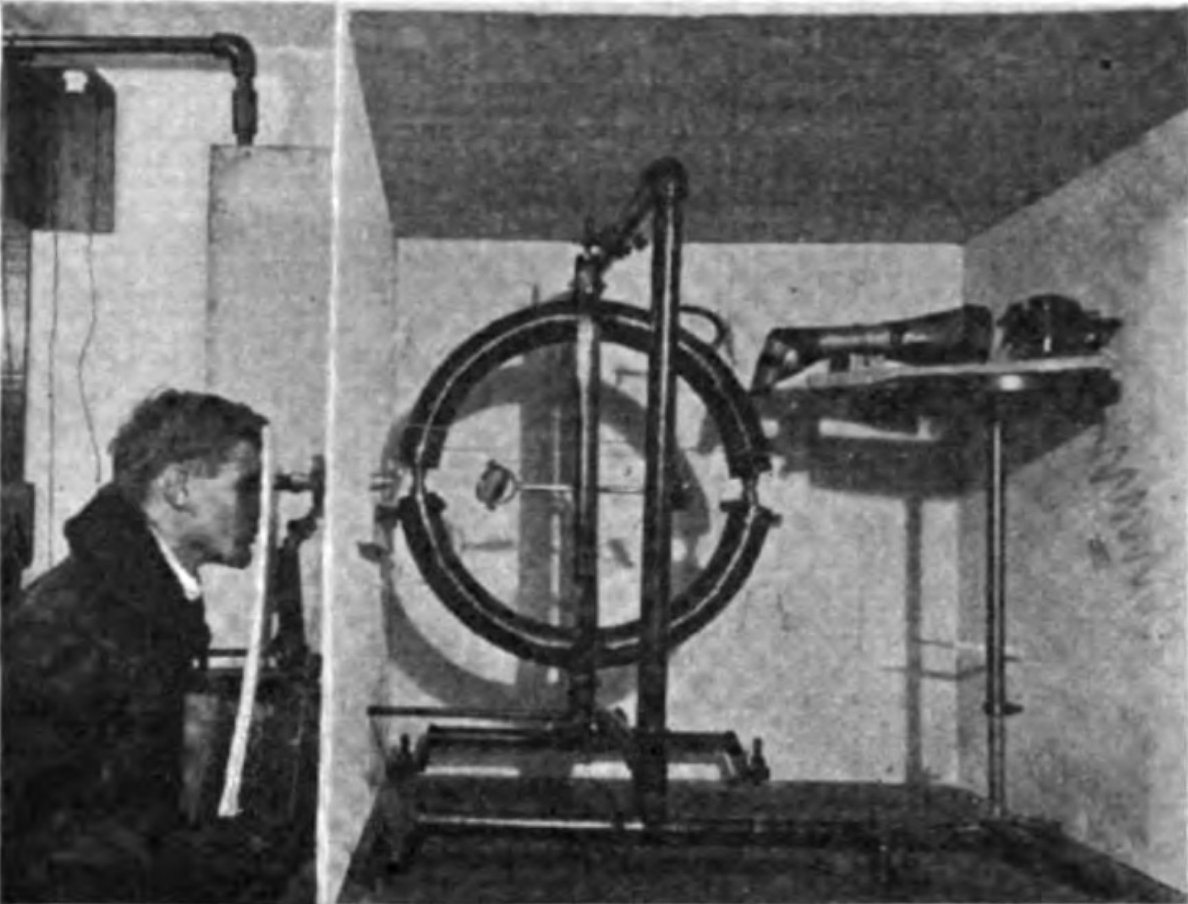
Arthur Compton was experimenting by the Compton Generator. The box is constructed out of asbestos to minimize the temperature differential across the ring, which causes errors since it creates convectional current. There is a further screen of asbestos in front of Compton in order to prevent his breath from hitting the box of asbestos.

A Compton generator or Compton tube is an apparatus for experiment to demonstrate the Earth's rotation, similar to the Foucault pendulum and to gyroscope devices. Arthur Compton (Nobel Prize in Physics in 1927) published it during his fourth year at the College of Wooster in 1913.

== Explanation of apparatus ==
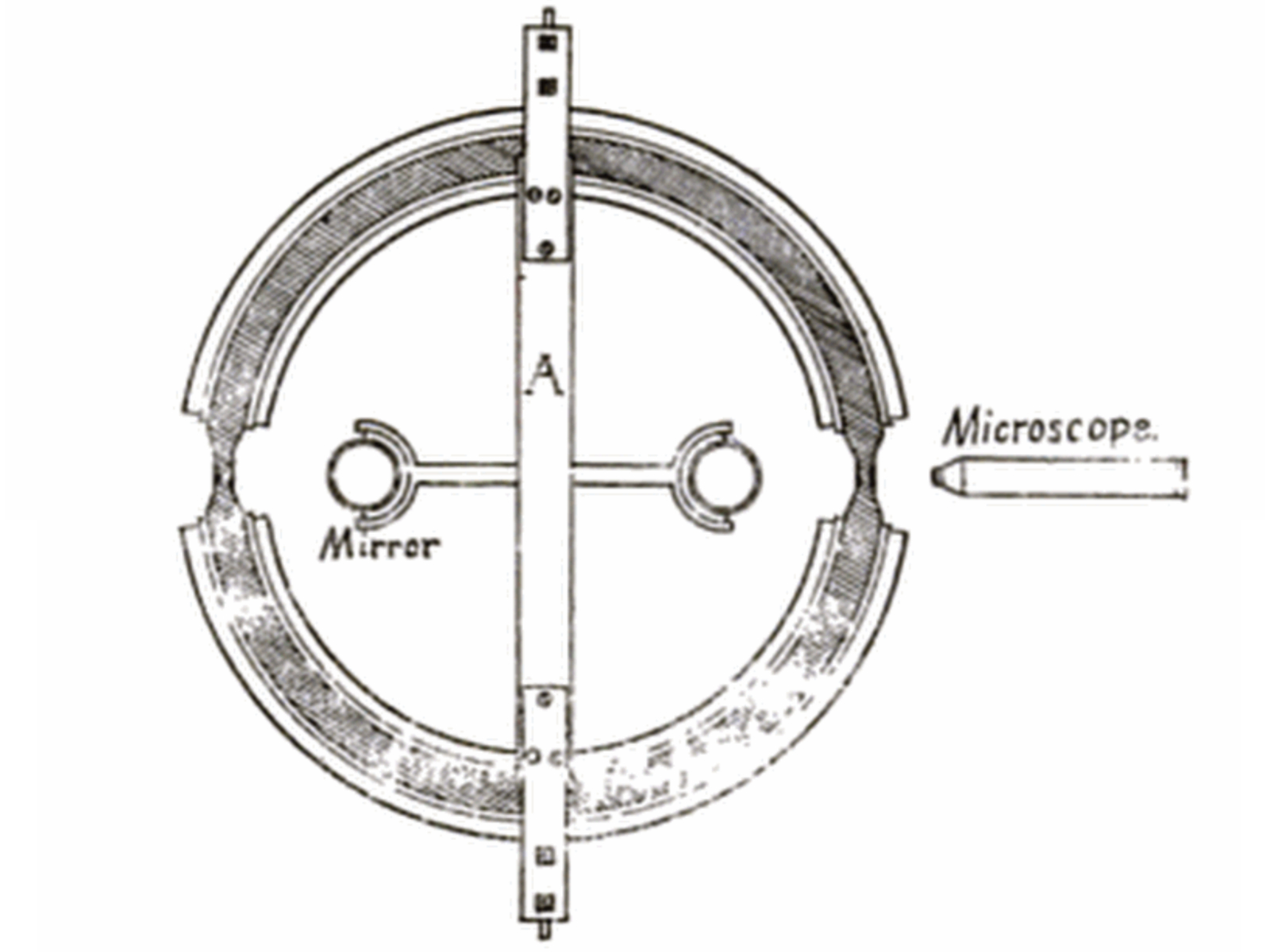
Construction of Compton generator.

A Compton generator is a circular hollow glass ring tube shaped like a doughnut, the inside of which is filled with water. If the ring lies flat on the table, the water in the ring is stationary, and it is then turned over by rotating itself 180 degree around a diameter, such that it again lies flat on the table surface, which is horizontal. The result of the experiment is that the water moves with a certain constant drift velocity around the tube after the doughnut has been rotated. If there were no friction with the walls, the water would continue to circulate indefinitely.

The ring used in the initial experiment was made of one inch brass tubing bent into a circle eighteen inches in diameter, where the windows were placed the tube was constricted to a diameter of about 3/8 inches (9.5 mm).

Compton used small droplets of coal oil mixed in the water to measure the drift velocity under a microscope.

== Analysis ==
Assume the diameter of the glass tube is much smaller than the diameter of the ring, and $R$ is the radius of the ring, $\omega$ is the Earth rotation rate and $\lambda$ is the latitude.

Initially the ring is horizontal and the water is stationary. Second the ring is then quickly rotated by 180° around its east–west diameter and stopped, such that it again lies flat on the table surface, which is horizontal. At this time, the velocity $v_{th}$ of the water in the tube is given by
$v_{th} = 2 \omega R \sin \lambda$

Note that a rotation from the vertical to the vertical position produces the velocity $v_{tv}$ of the water in the tube is given by
$v_{tv} = 2 \omega R \cos \lambda$

This is derived by first integrating the torque due to the Coriolis force around the ring, then integrating the torque over the time it takes for the ring to flip, to obtain the change in angular momentum.

With these two equations, one can solve for both $\omega, \lambda$, thus finding both the rotation speed of earth and the latitude of the apparatus.

== Experimental verification ==
Compton used this measured drift velocity to determine his latitude to within 3% accuracy. He also used it to measure the rotational period of earth to an accuracy of 16 minutes per day (accuracy of 1%). By careful methods he could observe the effect in a ring with a radius of only 9 inches (23 cm).

Earth's rotation is 7.3 × 10^{−5} radians/second. In the original report, Compton used a ring of 1 meter in radius at the College of Wooster (latitude 41 degrees). This would translate to a velocity of about $v_{th} \approx 0.1 \mathrm{mm/sec}$.

== Bibliography ==
=== Journal ===
- Compton, Arthur Holly (1913). "A laboratory method of demonstrating the Earth's rotation". Science. 37 (960): 803–806. Bibcode:1913Sci....37..803C. doi:10.1126/science.37.960.803. PMID 17838837.
- Compton, Arthur Holly (1915). "A determination of latitude, Azimuth, and the length of the day independent of astronomical observations". Physical Review. 5 (2): 109–117. Bibcode:1915PhRv....5..109C. doi:10.1103/PhysRev.5.109.
- Compton, Arthur Holly (1915). "Watching the Earth revolve". Scientific American Supplement. 79 (2047supp): 196–197. doi:10.1038/scientificamerican03271915-196supp.

=== Books ===
- Hand, Louis N. (1999). Analytical Mechanics. Cambridge University Press. ISBN 978-0521575720.
- Taylor, John R. (2005). Classical Mechanics. S.Chand & Company Ltd. ISBN 978-1891389221.
- Blackie's Dictionary of Physics. S.Chand & Company Ltd. 2000. ISBN 978-8121942379.
