= Rao Yutai =

Chinese physicist (1891–1968)

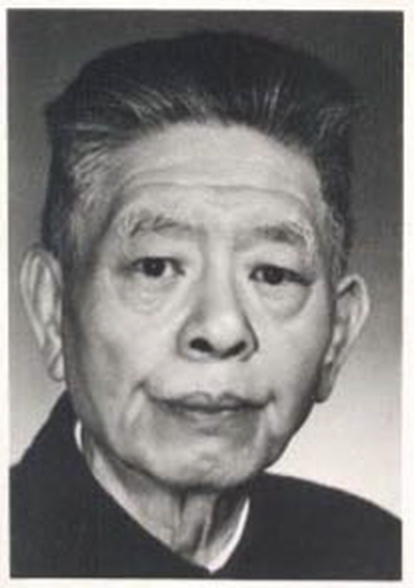

Rao Yutai (Chinese: 饒毓泰; December 1, 1891 – October 16, 1968) was a Chinese physicist, one of the founders of modern physics in China. He was a founding member of Academia Sinica in 1948 and of the Chinese Academy of Sciences in 1955.

== Early years ==
Rao was born in Linchuan, Jiangxi, Qing Empire in December 1891.

== University ==
In 1913, Rao went to study in the United States, sponsored by the government. He was first recruited to the University of California, and moved to the University of Chicago. He obtained his bachelor in physics in winter 1917. He enrolled in the graduate school at Harvard University in 1918. Later, he moved to Yale University and then Princeton University. He received his master's degree from Princeton in 1921, and his doctorate in 1922. His dissertation was on the emission efficiency of low-pressure electrical arcs, under the supervision of K.T. Compton.

He returned to China and was recruited to Nankai University, where he founded the department of physics and served as chair. His notable students include Wu Ta-You, Wu Daren, Yung-huai Kuo, Jiang Zehan, Ma Shijun, Shen Youzhen, Shiing-shen Chern and Zheng Huazhi.

== Research abroad ==
In 1929 Rao went to do research at the University of Leipzig in Germany. He returned to China in 1932 and became a fellow in the physics institute of the Peking Research Institute. He later became the chair of the physics department at Peking University, and was promoted to dean of the school of science in 1935. He was the chair of the physics department at the National Southwestern Associated University during the Sino-Japanese War. From 1944 to 1947, he studied molecular spectra in the United States, in collaboration with A. H. Nielsen.

He was dean and chair of physics until 1951 at Peking University and was elected a member of the Chinese Academy of Sciences in 1955.

== Persecution ==
Rao was severely persecuted in Cultural Revolution. He committed suicide on the university campus on October 16, 1968. He was posthumously rehabilitated in 1978.

== Honors ==
In 2000, the Chinese Physical Society established five prizes, in recognition of five pioneers of modern physics in China. The Rao Yutai Prize is awarded to physicists in Optics, Acoustics, Atomic and Molecular physics.
