= John Joseph Compton =

American philosopher (1929-2014)

- Born: May 17, 1928; Chicago, Illinois, U.S.
- Died: January 18, 2014 (aged 85)

Education
- Education: College of Wooster (BA, 1949); Yale University (PhD, 1953)

Philosophical work
- Era: Contemporary philosophy
- Region: Western philosophy
- Institutions: Vanderbilt University

John Joseph Compton (May 17, 1928 – January 18, 2014) was an American philosopher and Emeritus Professor of Philosophy at Vanderbilt University (retired in 1998). Compton was a president of the Metaphysical Society of America (1979). He was the son of Arthur Compton.
