= Compton–Getting effect =

The Compton–Getting effect is an apparent anisotropy in the intensity of radiation or particles due to the relative motion between the observer and the source. This effect was first identified in the intensity of cosmic rays by Arthur Compton and Ivan A. Getting in 1935. Gleeson and Axford provide a full derivation of the equations relevant to this effect.

The original application of the Compton–Getting effect predicted that the intensity of cosmic rays should be higher coming from the direction in which Earth is moving. For the case of cosmic rays the Compton–Getting effect only applies to those that are unaffected by the Solar wind such as extremely high energy particles. It has been calculated that the speed of the Earth within the galaxy (200 kilometres per second (120 mi/s)) would result in a difference between the strongest and weakest cosmic ray intensities of about 0.1%. This small difference is within the capabilities of modern instruments to detect, and was observed in 1986. Forman (1970) derives the Compton–Getting effect anisotropy from the Lorentz invariance of the phase space distribution function. Ipavich (1974) furthers this general derivation to derive count rates with respect to the flow vector.

This Compton–Getting effect is apparent in plasma data in Earth's magnetotail. The Compton–Getting effect has also been utilized for analyzing energetic neutral atom (ENA) data returned by the Cassini-Huygens spacecraft at Saturn.
