= Ian Waitz =

American aerospace engineer and academic administrator

Ian A. Waitz
- Education: Pennsylvania State University (BS); George Washington University (MS); California Institute of Technology (PhD)
- Employer: Massachusetts Institute of Technology
- Known for: environmental effects of aviation
- Title: Vice President for Research
- Awards: National Academy of Engineering (2014); Fellow of AIAA (2006)
- Scientific career
- Fields: aeronautics, astronautics
- Institutions: Massachusetts Institute of Technology

Ian A. Waitz is an American aerospace engineer and academic administrator who serves as vice president for research at the Massachusetts Institute of Technology and as the Jerome C. Hunsaker Professor of Aeronautics and Astronautics.

Waitz received his BS in aerospace engineering in 1986 from the Pennsylvania State University, his MS in 1988 from George Washington University, and his PhD in 1991 from the California Institute of Technology, both in aeronautics.

Waitz was elected a Fellow of the American Institute of Aeronautics and Astronautics in 2006. He was elected to the National Academy of Engineering in 2014 for “analysis of environmental effects of aviation enabling practical environmental regulations”.

From 2017 to 2024, Waitz was MIT's vice chancellor for undergraduate and graduate education. He served as dean of MIT's School of Engineering from 2011 to 2017. He was a MacVicar Faculty Fellow from 2003 to 2013.
