= MIT School of Science =

School in Cambridge, Massachusetts, US

Coordinates: 42.3596°N 71.09048°W

The MIT School of Science is one of the five schools of the Massachusetts Institute of Technology, located in Cambridge, Massachusetts, United States. The School, which consolidated under the leadership of Karl Taylor Compton in 1932, is composed of 6 academic departments who grant SB, SM, and PhD or ScD degrees; as well as a number of affiliated laboratories and centers. As of 2020, the Dean of Science is Professor Nergis Mavalvala. With approximately 275 faculty members, 1100 graduate students, 700 undergraduate majors, 500 postdocs, and 400 research staff, the School is the second largest at MIT. As of 2019, 12 faculty members and 14 alumni of the School have won Nobel Prizes.

== Biology ==
The Department of Biology (Course 7) began as a department of natural history in 1871.

== Brain and Cognitive Sciences ==
The Department of Brain and Cognitive Sciences (Course 9) began as the Department of Psychology in 1964.

== Chemistry ==
The Department of Chemistry (Course 5) was one of the original departments when MIT opened in 1865.

== Earth, Atmospheric and Planetary Sciences ==
The Department of Earth, Atmospheric and Planetary Sciences (Course 12, or EAPS) traces its origins to the establishment of MIT by the geologist and education reformer William Barton Rogers in 1861. Before distinguishing himself as MIT's founder and first president, Rogers was a professor of natural philosophy and chemistry. He also served as State Geologist of Virginia, which explains why geology courses have been taught at MIT for more than a century.

In 1983, EAPS was formed through the merger of two MIT departments: the Department of Earth and Planetary Sciences, which grew out of the first geology courses, and the Department of Meteorology and Physical Oceanography, which had its roots in the meteorology courses that first emerged at MIT in 1941.

Today, EAPS seeks to understand the fundamental workings of natural systems by examining physical, chemical, and biological processes occurring across a vast spectrum of time and space. Its highly integrated research requires direct observation as well as modeling, and the department fosters interdisciplinary ventures that open new avenues of exploration.

== Mathematics ==
Department of Mathematics (Course 18)

== Physics ==
The Department of Physics (Course 8)

== Affiliated laboratories and centers ==
=== Center for Cancer Research ===
Now merged into the Koch Institute for Integrative Cancer Research.

=== Center for Global Change Science ===
The Center for Global Change Science (CGCS) at MIT was founded in January 1990 to address fundamental questions about climate processes with a multidisciplinary approach. In July 2006, the CGCS became an independent Center in the School of Science. The center's goal is to improve the ability to accurately predict changes in the global environment.

The CGCS seeks to better understand the natural mechanisms in ocean, atmosphere and land systems that together control the Earth's climate, and to apply improved knowledge to problems of predicting climate changes. The Center utilizes theory, observations, and numerical models to investigate climate phenomena, the linkages among them, and their potential feedbacks in a changing climate.

The director of the CGCS is Professor Ron Prinn from MIT.

=== Center for Ultracold Atoms ===
The MIT–Harvard Center for Ultracold Atoms (CUA) is a collaborative research laboratory between MIT and Harvard University.

The core research program in the CUA consists of four collaborative experimental projects whose goals are to provide new sources of ultracold atoms and quantum gases, and new types of atom-wave devices. These projects will enable new research on topics such as quantum fluids, atom/photon optics, coherence, spectroscopy, ultracold collisions, and quantum devices. In addition, the CUA has a theoretical program centered on themes of quantum optics, many-body physics, wave physics, and atomic structure and interactions.

The Director of the CUA is Wolfgang Ketterle (a 2001 Nobel laureate in physics) from MIT.

=== Francis Bitter Magnet Laboratory ===
Formerly considered the world's premier high-field magnet research center, the Laboratory was merged into the Plasma Science and Fusion Center, after the National Science Board decided in 1990 to locate the new National High Magnetic Field Laboratory at Florida State University. MIT appealed this decision unsuccessfully; at the time, this was the first appeal of an NSB decision.
