= Carroll L. Wilson =

American university administrator

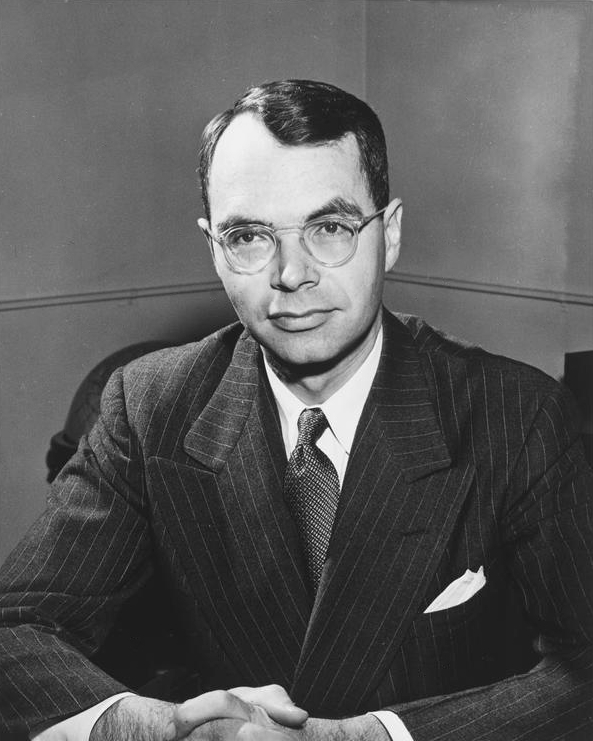
- Wilson, c. 1946

General Manager of the United States Atomic Energy Commission
- In office December 31, 1946 – August 15, 1950
- President: Harry S. Truman
- Preceded by: Position established
- Succeeded by: Marion W. Boyer

Personal details
- Born: Carroll Louis Wilson; September 21, 1910 Rochester, New York, U.S.
- Died: January 12, 1983 (aged 72) Providence, Rhode Island
- Spouse: Mary Bischoff (m. 1937)
- Children: 4
- Education: Massachusetts Institute of Technology (SB)
- Profession: Engineer, university administrator
- Awards: Medal for Merit (1948); Honorary OBE (1948); Tyler Prize for Environmental Achievement (1982)

Carroll Louis Wilson (21 September 1910 – 12 January 1983) was an American science administrator and professor of management at the Massachusetts Institute of Technology (MIT). From 1946 to 1950 he was the first general manager of the United States Atomic Energy Commission (AEC).

Wilson graduated from MIT in 1932 and stayed on as assistant to its president, Karl Compton, and afterwards as adviser to the vice president, Vannevar Bush. He followed Bush into wartime Washington in 1940, serving as his executive assistant and founded the office that handled scientific exchange with Britain and the other Allied governments. Wilson served as Bush's proxy across the Office of Scientific Research and Development. He helped Bush draft Science, The Endless Frontier (1945), the report that framed the postwar case for federal support of basic research, and he served as secretary to the board that produced the Acheson–Lilienthal Report (1946) on international control of atomic energy.

At age 36, Wilson became general manager of the new AEC, taking charge of the Manhattan Project's plants and laboratories when they passed from Army to civilian control in January 1947. He and chairman David E. Lilienthal built the agency around field managers with wide authority and a small headquarters staff. Civilian power programs, and reactor development in particular, drew persistent criticism, and the Soviet atomic test of 1949 redirected the commission toward thermonuclear weapon production. In medical experiments with radiation, Wilson introduced an early instance of the term "informed consent", but the AEC did little to enforce the standard. Wilson resigned in August 1950 under a transition to Truman's new chairman.

After nine years in the uranium and reactor-fuel industries, Wilson returned to MIT in 1959, becoming a professor in the School of Industrial Management. He founded the Fellows in Africa program, which placed young graduates in newly independent African governments. In the 1970s he organized and directed several international studies of the global environment and of world energy supply, among them the Study of Critical Environmental Problems (1970) and the Workshop on Alternative Energy Strategies (1977). As an early member of the Club of Rome he brought in his MIT colleague Jay Forrester, whose modelling became the basis for The Limits to Growth (1972). His 1973 proposal for a national energy program introduced the term "energy independence" to American politics.

== Early life and education ==
Wilson was born in Rochester, New York, on 21 September 1910, the son of Louis William Wilson and Edna Carroll Wilson. His uncle, Frank J. Wilson, was chief of the U.S. Secret Service. He spent a brief period at Phillips Academy in Andover, Massachusetts, in 1926 and graduated from Monroe High School in Rochester in 1928, entering MIT the same year. As an undergraduate he was elected an officer of the student government, which brought him into contact with the Institute's senior administrators.

== Early career ==
Wilson earned his S.B. in management in 1932, the year MIT's president Karl Compton restructured the Institute around four schools and appointed Vannever Bush MIT's vice president. Among the new posts was an assistantship in the president's office reserved for a fresh graduate, to which Compton appointed Wilson. The office next door belonged to Vannevar Bush, then vice president of MIT. Wilson later contrasted the two men: "Compton was interested in new things and new ways of doing them. He said 'How?' rather than 'No.'...Van, on the other hand, was a tough hombre who did tough jobs."

Wilson served as assistant to Compton until 1936 and then as special adviser to Bush. In March 1937 he took charge of the newly opened Boston office of the Research Corporation of New York, the nonprofit patent-management foundation that had just secured exclusive rights to license MIT's inventions. (Note: Sources differ on whether this ended his MIT employment: Eliot Fishman writes that Research Corporation "hired [him] away from MIT." MIT's finding aid describes him as still at the Institute and working for Research Corporation from March 1937 to June 1940.) Wilson helped settle the terms of the MIT–Research Corporation contract from inside the Institute, sitting in on the MIT Patent Committee and taking over from Bush the task of writing its minutes.

From 1938, Wilson, then in his late twenties, sat on the MIT Patent Committee as a guest member. His principal initiative concerned the vitamin research of the MIT chemist Nicholas Milas. At least two pharmaceutical firms had shown interest in licensing the work. Wilson asked why the Institute should not approach the whole industry instead, offering each firm assurance of non-exclusive rights in return for modest royalties, with the Research Corporation matching the grants. Four companies subscribed by February 1939. MIT thereby raised money for Milas without favoring any one firm or giving up title to the resulting patents, a step up from MIT's subordinate role in industry research agreements of the decade prior.

== World War II ==
=== National Defense Research Committee ===
When the National Defense Research Committee (NDRC) was established in June 1940 under Bush's chairmanship, Bush seconded Wilson from the Research Corporation to serve as his executive assistant. Bush later described him as his "prime captive," his most important early hire. (Note: Bush recalled telephoning the Research Corporation president, Howard Poillon, to "thank him for the loan." According to Bush, Poillon replied: "I had as much to do with loaning you Carroll Wilson as Queen Wilhelmina had to do with loaning Holland to the Germans.")

Wilson's first substantial assignment was a survey of American research capacity. Working from replies gathered by Bell Labs president Frank B. Jewett and Harvard president James B. Conant, he compiled by early August 1940 a "Report on Research Facilities of Certain Educational and Scientific Institutions." According to James Phinney Baxter, the OSRD's official historian, it "proved of much service, and was internally known as 'the Bible.'"

=== British scientific interchange ===
Wilson was among the small group of Americans who received the Tizard Mission, the British delegation that arrived in September 1940 carrying the cavity magnetron and British technologies classified as military secrets. Bush, who preferred to delegate and stay away, sent Wilson in his place. Wilson attended a Washington party for the visitors on 19 September alongside MIT President Karl Compton and Admiral Harold Bowen. He was then one of the handful of Americans at the two weekend meetings Alfred Loomis convened at his estate in Tuxedo Park, New York. At the first, on 28 September, he and the Microwave Committee secretary Edward L. Bowles met the mission's Edward "Taffy" Bowen and John Cockcroft. Ernest Lawrence joined the second, on 12 October. Those discussions led to the founding of the MIT Radiation Laboratory.

Wilson, working with Cockcroft and Ralph Fowler, drafted the arrangement to formalize ongoing US–UK exchange after the initial Tizard Mission. The agreement was approved on 25 October 1940 by the Secretaries of War and the Navy and by the NDRC. In February 1941, James Conant flew for Britain to open a permanent NDRC Liaison Office in London. Wilson accompanied him as liaison officer, reasoning that he would be better able to support the London office if he had seen its problems first hand. Conant's plane touched down on 1 March 1941, while Wilson and Frederick L. Hovde arrived three days later during a German air raid. The terms set during the Conant Mission governed Allied scientific liaison for the remainder of the war. Britain and the United States would trade war research information between their ministries and agencies directly, with no reservation on commercial grounds. Wilson and Conant returned to the United States in April, leaving Hovde to run the office.

=== Office of Scientific Research and Development ===
Administrative Order No. 1, approved by President Roosevelt on 20 August 1941, made the Liaison Office one of the principal subdivisions of the newly created Office of Scientific Research and Development (OSRD). Wilson was named Senior Liaison Officer. The office ran a London mission, moved reports and cables across the Atlantic, arranged passage to England, and vetted foreign scientists visiting OSRD projects. Sharing British reports properly meant Wilson's office had to follow research in every OSRD division. Wilson resigned the post on 30 October 1942 to return full time to Bush's office as executive assistant to the director, and was succeeded by Caryl Haskins.

Among Bush's aides, Wilson alone "possessed Bush's complete confidence and served as his alter ego in matters to which Bush could not give his personal attention." According to Bush, "Carroll spoke in my name throughout the organization, even when it attained its full complexity, on any subject," he wrote, "and he was the only one who did so. He had that rare tact which enabled him to do so without ever getting anyone mad." Bush thought Wilson's youth was part of what made this possible, and suspected that his method in disputes was to persuade the parties that settling between themselves was preferable to a ruling from the director.

Wilson served as secretary of the OSRD Advisory Council. In October 1944, Bush appointed him to set on the OSRD Committee on Publications to coordinate declassification and publication of the agency's research.

=== Science, The Endless Frontier ===
Wilson was among the small group who helped Bush prepare Science, The Endless Frontier, the July 1945 report to President Truman that framed the postwar debate over federal support of research. Bush worked on the report through the spring of 1945 with considerable aid from Wilson. (Note: Also supporting the writing effort were Oscar Ruebhausen and Bethuel M. Webster.) Wilson advised Bush that the proposed foundation's trustees should understand the peculiarities of scientific research and education but should "truly" represent the public interest rather than "primarily...those groups which will be the recipients of support." Don K. Price, the Bureau of the Budget's staff officer for scientific research, successfully pressed Wilson to insert language in the final version stressing that the program "must be responsible to the President and the Congress."

For his wartime service Wilson received the Medal for Merit in 1948 and was appointed an honorary Officer of the Civil Division of the Order of the British Empire.

== Atomic energy ==
=== Board of Consultants ===
The committee that produced the Acheson–Lilienthal Report began partly at Wilson's prompting. In the weeks after the Moscow Conference he came to Bush with proposals for studies that ought to be made before any United Nations commission on atomic energy convened. Bush agreed and urged Secretary of State James F. Byrnes to begin them. When the resulting Board of Consultants on International Control of Atomic Energy was formed under David E. Lilienthal, Bush loaned Wilson to serve as its secretary. The board—which also included Chester Barnard, J. Robert Oppenheimer, Charles A. Thomas and Harry A. Winne—first met on 23 January 1946 and concluded its report in March. Wilson's work on the finished document was later deemed "[j]ust as significant" as that of the consultants themselves." (Note: As staff, Wilson and his State Department counterpart Herbert S. Marks, "had done much to set the broad outline and develop the main line of argument. They had borne a heavy share of the literary labors." The report's introduction thanks Wilson and Marks recording that whatever value the work proved to have owed much to "their acumen, diligence, and high quality of judgment.")

Later that year Wilson took his first job in private industry, as vice president and financial director of the National Research Corporation of Boston.

=== Atomic Energy Commission ===
The Atomic Energy Act of 1946 vested American oversight of atomic energy in five commissioners and created a presidentially appointed general manager to serve as chief executive officer. Wilson had set up the AEC's temporary staff in the autumn of 1946 and served as its acting administrative officer. Not at first among the leading candidates for general manager, in part because of those existing ties and in part because of his age, he was nominated to the role by an advisory panel led by Karl Compton. Lilienthal wrote to Truman that the commission's choice of Wilson rested on "the peculiarly relevant experience which he has had, [and] the combination of youth, energy, and mature judgment which he will bring to the office." At age 36, Wilson was asked to take the post, which began on 31 December.

Senators on the Joint Committee on Atomic Energy questioned his lack of managerial experience experience. Wilson acknowledged in questioning that his only experience managing payroll was his eight months at the National Research Corporation of Boston. Conant testified that a large corporation had asked him to nominate a successor to its retiring chief executive, that he had put forward Wilson, and that the company offered $75,000 a year, which Wilson turned down.

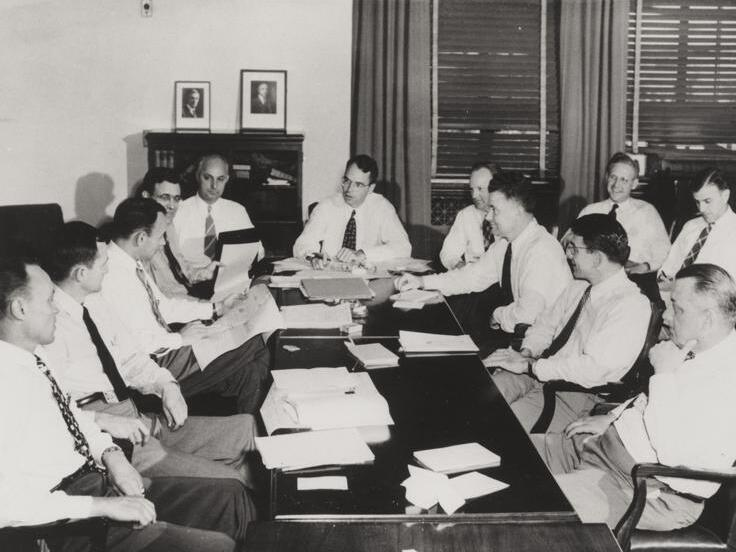
Wilson presiding at a 1947 Atomic Energy Commission staff meeting

On 1 January 1947 the Manhattan Project passed from Army to civilian control, giving Wilson responsibility for production plants, laboratories and offices in thirteen states staffed by more than 2,000 military personnel, 4,000 federal civilian employees and 38,000 contractor employees. A 1947 profile in the Saturday Evening Post valued the plants, laboratories, mines and testing ranges in his charge at some $2 billion, ranking them "right after United States Steel in physical value," and described the general managership as the most exacting job in the country apart from those of the president and the secretary of state. Much of his work was making a permanent agency out of a wartime project. Field managers at Los Alamos, Oak Ridge, New York, Chicago and Hanford reported directly to him and were free within wide limits to hire and to let contracts, while headquarters stayed small and held no line authority over them. Wilson and Lilienthal treated this decentralization as a principle rather than a convenience.

The act charged the commission with civil power development as well as weapons. Military uses claimed most of the money and attention throughout Wilson's three and a half years and civilian power receded. Reactor development drew the most sustained criticism of any part of the program. A plan to concentrate the work at Argonne National Laboratory under Walter Zinn collapsed in 1948, and the scientific General Advisory Committee told the commissioners that it despaired of progress. Wilson took the problem on himself, setting priorities for the next two or three years. The Materials Testing Reactor, which he had at first questioned, became the centerpiece. Since Edward Teller's Reactor Safeguard Committee would not approve high power levels near a city, it required a remote proving ground. A stretch of Idaho desert was chosen, and a new division of reactor development was formed at the beginning of 1949, later known as the National Reactor Testing Station.

Political pressure, a constant, eventually broke through. Senator Bourke B. Hickenlooper demanded Lilienthal's resignation in the spring of 1949 and charged the commission with "incredible mismanagement". Wilson and his division directors spent the summer on call to testify. The committee majority reported in the commission's favor, alongside Hickenlooper's minority report that its management had been inadequate.

The Soviet detonation of August 1949 scrambled the peacetime priorities of the AEC. Wilson arranged a review panel under Bush to test the evidence and set his own staff to checking it by other routes. On his own authority, he alerted the British to sample the radioactive air mass, at some risk under the act's restrictions on disclosure. In the argument over the thermonuclear weapon that followed, his part was procedural and technical rather than advisory. Testifying to the Joint Committee in September, he described Los Alamos as working toward a 1951 test of a boosted fission device, "a step toward a possible thermonuclear bomb," which would take all the effort the laboratory could give it. He pressed AEC staff to investigate basic questions, like whether the existing plants could make enough tritium to make the weapon practicable and whether exploding them would raise atmospheric carbon-14 to dangerous levels. After Truman ordered the work forward in January 1950, Wilson and his deputy Carleton Shugg took personal charge of planning the reactors that would produce tritium. That March the General Electric power breeder, a civil power project, was postponed indefinitely, and the civilian Knolls laboratory turned to Hanford production problems and the naval submarine reactor.

==== Human radiation trials ====
Biology and medicine had been ancillary to the Manhattan Project, and the AEC inherited research that had begun to establish how much radiation a worker or a member of the public could safely absorb. Wilson convened the Army's advisory committee on the subject under Stafford L. Warren in January 1947 and a permanent advisory committee for biology and medicine under Shields Warren.

As AEC administrator, Wilson faced the task of settling ethical boundaries for human subjects research. The AEC was weighing whether to declassify reports on the plutonium injections carried out in secret, anticipating litigation and public reaction. Wilson stated terms for future research conduct in two letters of 1947. Wilson's April letter to Stafford Warren allowed medical data to be obtained in the course of treatment only where there was an expectation of therapeutic effect. It also stated that records should establish that the patient, "being in an understanding state of mind, was clearly informed of the nature of the treatment and its possible effects, and expressed his willingness to receive the treatment." His November letter to the Berkeley physician Robert Stone required the patient's "complete and informed consent in writing" together with that of the responsible next of kin. These conditions were proposed as standards for future experiments and for declassifying past ones.

Reviewing historical records in 1995, the Advisory Committee on Human Radiation Experiments (ACHRE) found that the letters stated a requirement of consent, but that the AEC did little to turn patient consent into working policy. (Note: The April letter received almost no distribution. Later requests for guidance from researchers were commonly answered without reference to either letter. However, of the eighteen plutonium injections given between 1945 and 1947, only the last fell after the April letter. ACHRE concluded that it violated the requirement of an expected therapeutic effect.) ACHRE also observed that it was "a matter of some historical interest" that the term informed consent appeared in the November letter at all, since previous scholarship had dated its first official use to a medical malpractice opinion of a decade later.

==== Resignation ====
By appointing both the commission and its general manager, the act of 1946 created ambiguous authority, and by 1949 the commissioners did not agree on where it lay. Lilienthal held that the original design had been wrong and that a part-time commission and a single administrator would do the work better. Gordon Dean, appointed in 1949, took the opposite view and pressed for the commissioners to decide directly on budgets, major contracts, construction projects, senior appointments and dealings with the Joint Committee. A security panel under the former FBI agent John Bugas added to the pressure in April 1950, recommending an assistant general manager with the right to go directly to the commissioners, which Wilson resisted.

When Truman appointed Dean chairman in July 1950, Wilson concluded that he would have to resign. Bush, Conant, Lilienthal, and Hartley Rowe all agreed. He left in August. He observed that the relationship "must be marked by a very high degree of confidence if the program is to be administered effectively," something he could not provide to Dean. He warned of "a steady trend during the past year in the direction of the commission as a body assuming the direct role of management of the program," which he expected to produce "a cumbersome, slow-moving administrative machine." Truman thanked him for his service "during the pioneer period." Dean was conciliatory, maintaining that the departure had been Wilson's own idea and that the two had not clashed.

=== Private industry ===
From 1951 to 1954, Wilson was president of the Climax Uranium Company, which operated a uranium mill in Colorado alongside the molybdenum mine of its parent company, the Climax Molybdenum Company. In July 1954 Wilson moved to the Metals and Controls Corporation of Attleboro, Massachusetts, a fabricator of naval reactor fuel, as vice-president and general manager, becoming president in 1956 and chairman of the executive committee in 1958. He resigned in 1959, the year the company merged with Texas Instruments.

In 1957 and 1958, Wilson sat on the Rockefeller Brothers Fund panel on international security.

== Return to MIT ==
Wilson returned to MIT in 1959 as a lecturer in the School of Industrial Management, becoming visiting professor in 1960 and full professor in 1961. In 1974 he was named the first holder of the Mitsui Professorship in Problems of Contemporary Technology, a chair endowed by thirty companies of the Mitsui group. He formally resigned from the Institute in 1976 but continued to teach as senior lecturer and Mitsui Professor until his death.

=== Fellows in Africa ===
Wilson had joined the Council on Foreign Relations in 1951, and in 1959 a Carnegie Endowment-funded council program took him to nine territories in Africa south of the Sahara. Travelling through countries soon to be independent, he became convinced that the shortage of trained administrators would be felt less at the top of the new governments than in the middle and lower grades that carried most day-to-day responsibility.

Discussions in his MIT seminar in January 1960 turned the observation into a program: twelve of the sixteen students said they would take a job in Africa if he could arrange one. The Ford Foundation agreed to fund the effort. MIT announced the program in October 1960 with eight fellows already in post in Nigeria, Tanganyika and Uganda. The fellows were employed and paid by the governments they served rather than by MIT or the United States, an arrangement Wilson regarded as a test of whether a government wanted a fellow badly enough to pay for one. The program later placed law graduates from Harvard and Yale as well as management graduates from MIT, and expanded into nine other sub-Saharan countries. Writing in The New Yorker, John McPhee described the program as "almost wholly the product of the mind of one man." A parallel program in Latin America began in 1965, and he directed both until they closed in 1967.

=== Energy and environment ===
In July 1970 Wilson organized and directed the Study of Critical Environmental Problems (SCEP), a month-long assessment held at Williamstown, Massachusetts. A report, Man's Impact on the Global Environment, was published by the MIT Press the same year. A follow-on study, Man's Impact on Climate (SMIC), brought thirty-five atmospheric scientists from fifteen countries to Stockholm in 1971 and produced Inadvertent Climate Modification. In 1972, he served as a senior adviser to the United Nations Conference on the Human Environment at Stockholm.

Wilson became a member of the Club of Rome, the private international group formed in 1968 to study what its members called "the predicament of mankind." At the club's Bern meeting in June 1970 he introduced Jay Forrester, his colleague at the Sloan School, as a new member. The club had been unable to agree on a research method, putting a promised grant from the Volkswagen Foundation at risk. Forrester offered his system dynamics approach and invited the members to MIT to see it. He drafted the first version of his world model on the flight home. That model, published as World Dynamics in 1971, became the basis for the World3 model behind The Limits to Growth.

Wilson was a director and vice-chairman of the Council on Foreign Relations, where he delivered the Elihu Root lectures in early 1973. The second lecture was adapted as "A Plan for Energy Independence," published in Foreign Affairs in July 1973, which called for cutting the growth of American energy consumption and for a National Energy Authority modelled on the original Atomic Energy Commission. Historian Peter Shulman has traced American use of the phrase "energy independence" to Wilson's lecture, noting that Richard Nixon adopted similar language in announcing Project Independence after the OPEC embargo began in October. By December 1973 Wilson had revised his own position substantially, telling Anthony Lewis that the United States would struggle to hold energy use at 1973 levels and that his earlier proposals for new tankers, larger ports, and refineries had been made obsolete by the projected collapse in imports.

Wilson's third Root lecture became the basis for the Workshop on Alternative Energy Strategies, which he directed from 1974. Thirty-five participants from fifteen countries worked for two and a half years on the study, published as Energy: Global Prospects 1985–2000 in 1977. He then directed the World Coal Study, whose 1980 report Coal—Bridge to the Future drew on collaborators from sixteen countries. The report argued that world coal production could be tripled within twenty years without environmental damage, provided that no country rolled back its environmental standards.

In 1979, writing in the Bulletin of the Atomic Scientists after the Three Mile Island accident, Wilson revisited the AEC's early hopes for nuclear power and concluded that too little attention had been paid to nuclear waste disposal, observing that failure to consider the full fuel lifecycle had degraded the prospects of nuclear energy.

Wilson's last project was the European Security Study, which he initiated in the autumn of 1981 under the auspices of the American Academy of Arts and Sciences to examine ways of strengthening NATO's conventional defenses. He chaired it from its inception until his death. Its 1983 report, Strengthening Conventional Deterrence in Europe, appeared after his death.

Wilson maintained many international engagements while at MIT. He was the United States member of the Commission on Scientific Research from 1961 to 1970 and a member of the United Nations Advisory Committee on the Application of Science and Technology to Development. He was trustee and chairman of the World Peace Foundation, a trustee of the International Federation of Institutes for Advanced Study in Stockholm, a member of the governing board of the International Centre of Insect Physiology and Ecology in Nairobi, and a trustee of the Woods Hole Oceanographic Institution. He belonged to the Trilateral Commission and to the Commission on Critical Choices for Americans, and served on the Krupp Prize selection committee at Essen from 1975 to 1978.

== Death and legacy ==
Wilson died of leukemia at Rhode Island Hospital in Providence on 12 January 1983, aged 72. He lived in Seekonk, Massachusetts. He was survived by his wife, the former Mary Bischoff, whom he married in 1937, by a son and three daughters, and by five grandchildren.

In May 1982 Wilson received the John and Alice Tyler Ecology–Energy Prize which cited his "fundamental work in modelling world energy supplies." He shared the prize with the Southern California Edison Company, accepting it in Nairobi. In his acceptance he urged the development of crops able to withstand large temperature swings, as a hedge against the atmospheric warming he anticipated. He held honorary doctorates from Williams College (1947) and Worcester Polytechnic Institute (1976).

Wilson was elected to the American Academy of Arts and Sciences and to the Royal Swedish Academy of Engineering Sciences, and belonged to the American Institute of Mining and Metallurgical Engineers.

MIT awards the Carroll L. Wilson Award annually to undergraduates proposing projects consistent with his work, selected by a committee that has included alumni of the Fellows in Africa program and former students and colleagues.

== Writings ==
=== Articles ===
- Wilson, Carroll L. (June 1963). "The M.I.T. Fellows in Africa Program". The Journal of Modern African Studies. 1 (2): 255–256. doi:10.1017/S0022278X0000118X.
- Wilson, Carroll L. (July 1973). "A Plan for Energy Independence". Foreign Affairs. 51 (4).
- Farmanfarmaian, Khodadad; Gutowski, Armin; Okita, Saburo; Roosa, Robert V.; Wilson, Carroll L. (January 1975). "How Can the World Afford OPEC Oil?". Foreign Affairs. 53 (2).
- Wilson, Carroll L. (June 1979). "Nuclear Energy: What Went Wrong". Bulletin of the Atomic Scientists: 13–17.

=== Reports directed ===
- Study of Critical Environmental Problems (1970). Man's Impact on the Global Environment: Assessment and Recommendations for Action (Report). Cambridge, Mass.: MIT Press.
- Study of Man's Impact on Climate (1971). Inadvertent Climate Modification (Report). Cambridge, Mass.: MIT Press.
- Workshop on Alternative Energy Strategies (1977). Energy: Global Prospects 1985–2000 (Report). New York: McGraw-Hill.
- World Coal Study (1980). Greene, Robert P.; Gallagher, J. Michael (eds.). Coal—Bridge to the Future (Report). Cambridge, Mass.: Ballinger.
- European Security Study (1983). Strengthening Conventional Deterrence in Europe: Proposals for the 1980s (Report). New York: St. Martin's Press.
