= Office of Scientific Research and Development =

World War II science funding agency of the United States government (1941–1947)

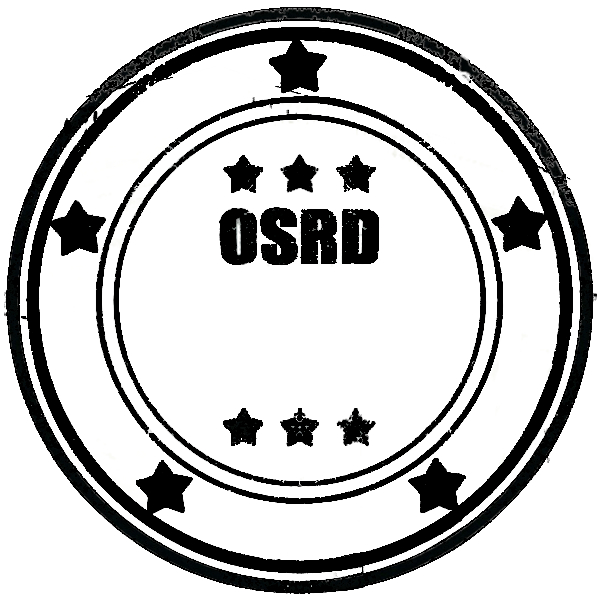

Agency overview
- Formed: June 28, 1941
- Preceding agency: National Defense Research Committee
- Dissolved: December 31, 1947
- Superseding agencies: Office of Naval Research; National Institutes of Health; Atomic Energy Commission; National Science Foundation
- Jurisdiction: United States government
- Headquarters: Washington, D.C.
- Employees: ~1,500 (peak)
- Annual budget: $167 milion (1945); Total: $536 million (1941–46)
- Agency executive: Vannevar Bush, Director
- Parent department: Office for Emergency Management
- Child agencies: National Defense Research Committee; Committee on Medical Research
- Key document: Executive Order 8807

The Office of Scientific Research and Development (OSRD) was an agency of the United States federal government created to coordinate scientific research for military purposes during World War II. Arrangements were made for its creation during May 1941, and it was created formally by Executive Order 8807 on June 28, 1941. It superseded the work of the National Defense Research Committee (NDRC), was given almost unlimited access to funding and resources, and was directed by Vannevar Bush, who reported only to President Franklin Delano Roosevelt.

The research was widely varied, and included projects devoted to new and more accurate bombs, reliable detonators, work on the proximity fuze, guided missiles, radar and early-warning systems, lighter and more accurate hand weapons, more effective medical treatments (including work to make penicillin at scale, which was necessary for its use as a drug), more versatile vehicles, and, the most secret of all, the S-1 Section, which later became the Manhattan Project and developed the first atomic weapons.

== Origins and background ==
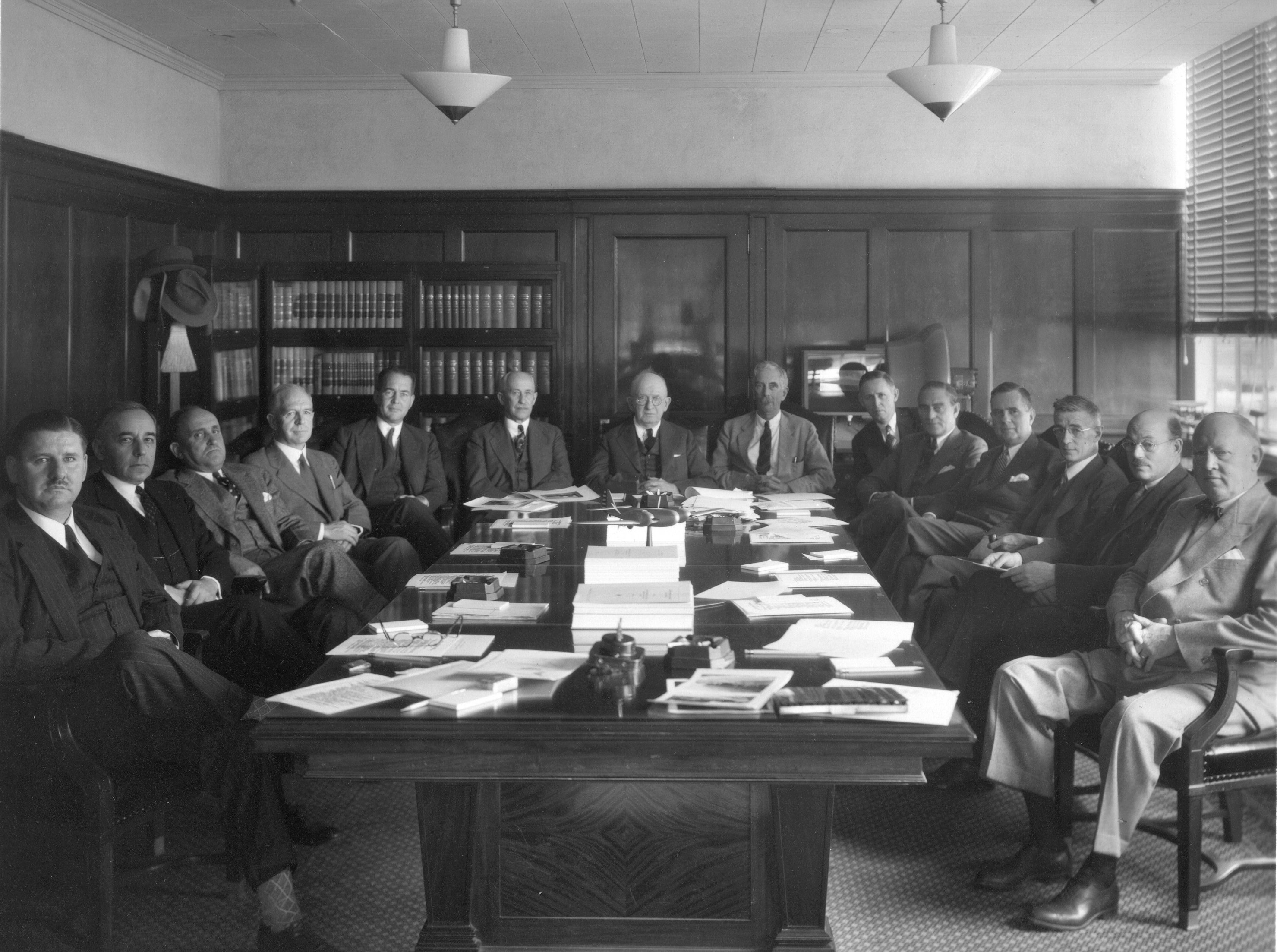
NACA committee, 1938

When Germany invaded Poland in September 1939, the United States possessed no significant government apparatus for mobilizing civilian science for military purposes. The country's military research establishments were small, underfunded, and disconnected from the nation's leading scientists at universities and industrial laboratories. The National Academy of Sciences, while authorized since 1863 to advise the government on scientific matters, lacked funds and operational capacity; its subordinate National Research Council had been largely ignored by the armed services during the interwar years. The only significant exception was the National Advisory Committee for Aeronautics (NACA), established in 1915, which had developed effective working relationships between government, universities, and the aircraft industry.

The scientific leaders who would create OSRD represented what historian Roger Geiger has called "a new generation of leadership in American science," one that had come of age during the fiscally constrained conditions of the 1930s. Unlike their predecessors, who had insisted that private philanthropy alone should support research, this generation was open to federal funding—though determined that scientific decisions remain in the hands of scientists. Many were also political conservatives who distrusted the expansion of government under the New Deal.

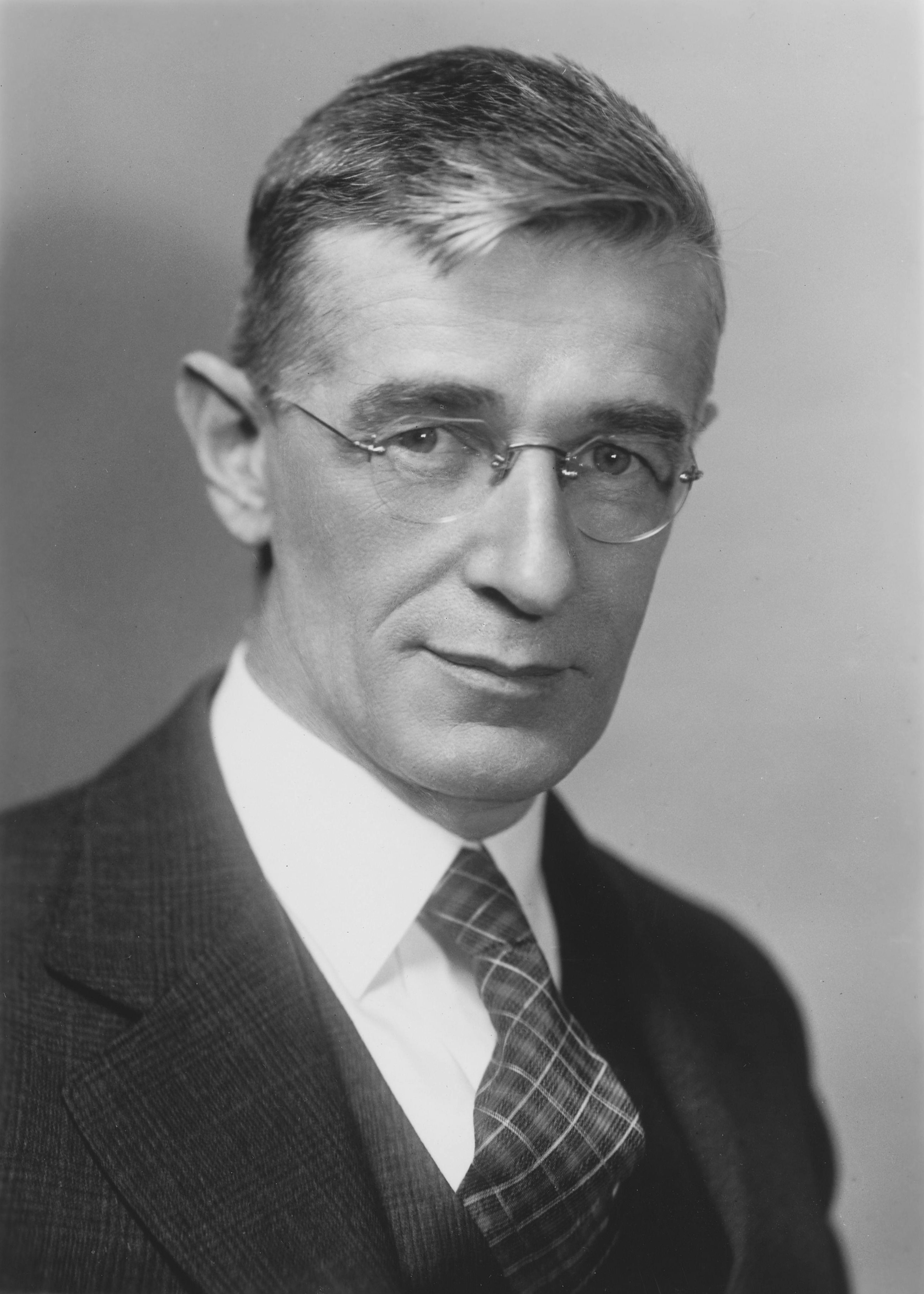
Bush (1938)

Vannevar Bush, an electrical engineer who had recently left the vice presidency of the Massachusetts Institute of Technology to become president of the Carnegie Institution of Washington, had been contemplating how to organize American science for a war he believed was coming. Bush drew on his experience as chairman of NACA and discussed his ideas with colleagues including Karl Compton of MIT, James Bryant Conant of Harvard, and Frank Jewett of Bell Telephone Laboratories and the National Academy of Sciences. As Conant later recalled, the group had concluded that "the military system as it existed, and as it had operated during the first war, ...would never fully produce the new instrumentalities which we would certainly need."

The German conquest of Western Europe in spring 1940 forced the issue. In early June, as German armies swept through France, Bush secured a brief meeting with President Roosevelt through presidential aide Harry Hopkins. Bush presented a single-page proposal for a new agency that would mobilize civilian scientists for defense research. Bush prepared himself to answer difficult questions. Roosevelt, who prized improvisation and had grown comfortable drawing New Deal critics into his wartime government, needed little persuading. The meeting lasted fewer than fifteen minutes. Roosevelt approved it on the spot, writing "OK—FDR" on the document. Within days, Roosevelt signed letters appointing Bush and his proposed colleagues to the new National Defense Research Committee, which came into formal existence on June 27, 1940, by order of the Council of National Defense.

Bush later acknowledged that the creation of the NDRC amounted to "an end run, a grab by which a small company of scientists and engineers, acting outside established channels, got hold of the authority and money for the program of developing new weapons." He would serve without a government salary, retaining his paid position at the Carnegie Institution even as it became eligible for NDRC contracts.

== Establishment ==
The NDRC proved effective in its first year, but Bush identified limitations that required a more powerful organization. NDRC's authority extended only to research, not to the engineering development necessary to transform laboratory discoveries into usable weapons. While the committee coordinated with the armed services, it lacked formal authority to ensure that its work meshed with Army and Navy requirements. Military medical research, vital for keeping troops healthy and treating casualties, remained outside NDRC's scope entirely.

These were not merely organizational inconveniences. The NDRC had been funded from the president's emergency fund via the Council of National Defense, which left it on uncertain legal footing and chronically short of money. Bush also wanted the authority to build prototype weapons and equipment: if the armed services refused to adopt something his researchers had developed, he could produce a working model and, as he saw it, dare them to ignore it. The addition of "Development" to the new agency's title was deliberate. Bush later noted that Congress understood and supported the principle that laboratories should be able to proceed beyond research and build hardware to demonstrate their results.

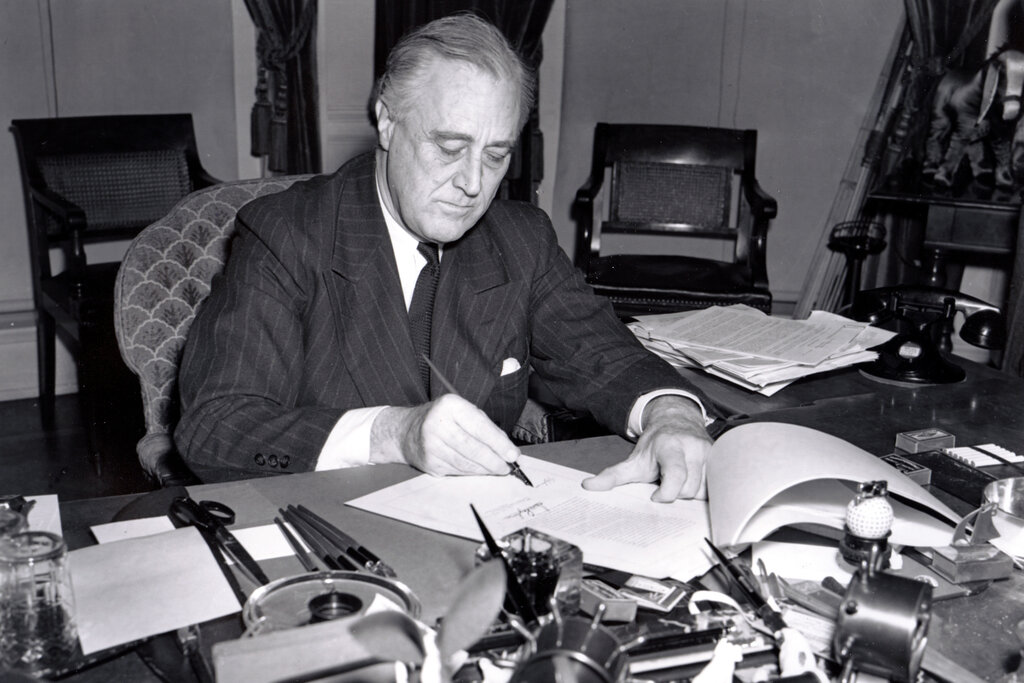
Roosevelt signs the Lend Lease Act, a precusor emergency measure, March 1941

To address these limitations, Roosevelt signed Executive Order 8807 on June 28, 1941, creating the Office of Scientific Research and Development within the Office for Emergency Management of the Executive Office of the President. The executive order charged OSRD with advising the president on defense-related research, coordinating the federal government's scientific work, mobilizing the nation's scientific personnel and resources, entering into contracts and agreements for research, and initiating research on behalf of allies whose defense the president deemed vital to American security. Crucially, OSRD would now receive direct congressional appropriations rather than relying on discretionary presidential funds, placing its operations on firmer legal and financial ground.

Bush was named Director of OSRD and retained direct access to Roosevelt, with no intervening bureaucratic layers. As historian Daniel Kevles has observed, this arrangement made OSRD responsive to, but not limited by, the military's perception of its own needs; the agency could proceed on a given research project whether the armed services approved or not. The reorganized NDRC, now chaired by James B. Conant, became one of OSRD's two main operating divisions. Bush retained the power to reject NDRC proposals or proceed without its recommendation. The other division was the newly created Committee on Medical Research (CMR), chaired by A. Newton Richards of the University of Pennsylvania, which assumed responsibility for medical and biological research relating to national defense.

== Organization ==
=== Leadership ===
OSRD was structured to maximize scientific autonomy while coordinating with the military services. Bush, the director, reported directly to the President, with no intervening bureaucratic layers. An Advisory Council, composed of the director, the chairmen of NDRC and CMR, and representatives of the Army and Navy, provided policy guidance.

OSRD Principal Officers
Position	Incumbent	Affiliation
Director	Vannevar Bush	President, Carnegie Institution of Washington
NDRC Chairman	James B. Conant	President, Harvard University
CMR Chairman	Alfred N. Richards	Vice President of Medical Affairs, University of Pennsylvania
Executive Secretary	Irvin Stewart	Former FCC Commissioner
Special Assistant to Director	Carroll L. Wilson	Former assistant to MIT President Karl Compton

=== National Defense Research Committee ===
Following the creation of OSRD, NDRC underwent a major reorganization in December 1942. The original five broad divisions were replaced by a structure of nineteen technical divisions, two panels, and two special committees, each focused on a specific class of military problems:

NDRC Divisions (December 1942 reorganization)
Division	Subject	Chief
1	Ballistics research	Leason Adams
2	Effects of impact and explosion	John Ely Burchard
3	Rocket ordnance	John T. Tate
4	Ordnance accessories	Alexander Ellett
5	New missiles	H. B. Richmond
6	Subsurface warfare	John T. Tate
7	Fire control	Harold L. Hazen
8	Explosives	George Kistiakowsky
9	Chemistry	Walter R. Kirner
10	Absorbents and aerosols	W. Albert Noyes Jr.
11	Chemical engineering	R. P. Russell
12	Transportation	Hartley Rowe
13	Electrical communication	C. B. Jolliffe
14	Radar	Alfred L. Loomis
15	Radio coordination	C. Guy Suits
16	Optics and camouflage	George R. Harrison
17	Physics	Paul E. Klopsteg
18	War metallurgy	Clyde Williams
19	Miscellaneous weapons	H. M. Chadwell

In addition, NDRC maintained the Applied Mathematics Panel, the Applied Psychology Panel, and special committees on propagation and tropical deterioration.

=== Committee on Medical Research ===
The CMR was organized into six divisions covering the major fields of military medicine:

CMR Divisions
Division	Subject
Medicine	Infectious diseases, tropical diseases, convalescence, neuropsychiatry
Surgery	Wounds, burns, neurosurgery, surgical specialties
Aviation medicine	Physiological effects of high altitude, acceleration, decompression
Physiology	Blood substitutes, shock, nutrition
Chemistry	Treatment of gas casualties, insect and pest control
Malaria	Antimalarial drugs and treatment

CMR worked closely with the Division of Medical Sciences of the National Research Council, which provided expert advice through specialized subcommittees.

=== Administrative structure ===
Beyond the technical divisions, OSRD maintained administrative offices for contracts and finance, personnel, field service, publications, and liaison with foreign allies. At its peak in 1945, the agency employed approximately 850 full-time paid staff in Washington and an additional 650 people working part-time or without compensation, for a total of roughly 1,500 personnel. This small central staff coordinated work performed by thousands of scientists and engineers at contractor facilities across the country.

== Operations ==
=== The contract system ===
One of OSRD's lasting organizational innovations was its systematic use of government research contracts to fund civilian science. When Harvard president James Conant first learned of Bush's plans, he expected that wartime research would be organized as it had been in World War I—by constructing government laboratories and staffing them with soldier-scientists. Bush quickly corrected him: "we will write contracts with universities, research institutes and industrial laboratories." The implications, Conant later wrote, were immediately apparent: this approach "portended the beginning of a new relationship between the federal government and the nation's universities."

Rather than attempting to bring scientists into government or expanding military laboratories, OSRD funded research at universities, industrial firms, hospitals, and other private institutions, which retained their independence while working on government-defined problems. This approach reflected both the growth in United States' industrial and university research capacities since the prior war, and the ideological preferences of OSRD's leaders, who sought to keep scientific direction in civilian hands.

In emergencies, "crash" programs were undertaken in which OSRD managed pilot production directly, funded by money transferred from the armed services rather than from OSRD's own appropriations.

=== Scientific autonomy ===
Bush organized OSRD as a "pyramidal structure" that kept scientific decisions decentralized while centralizing administrative control. Each of Bush's civilian appointees became directors of major divisions and established specialized sections as needed; it was at these lower levels, where scientists and engineers worked directly with military representatives, that research was actually conducted. This arrangement was a deliberate contrast with World War I, when scientists who wished to contribute had generally been required to accept military command procedures, with research priorities set by officers who often dismissed civilian expertise.

In practice, Bush drew a sharp distinction between the two sides of the organization. Scientific administration was handled by the division structure, with responsibility weighted toward the researchers closest to the work. Business operations, including the contracts through which OSRD channeled public money to private institutions, were centralized in the Office of the Executive Secretary under Irvin Stewart, whose staff eventually comprised fully a third of OSRD's full-time employees. Bush's own immediate staff was small. He relied heavily on his executive assistant Carroll L. Wilson, whom Stewart described as Bush's "alter ego" in matters to which the director could not give personal attention. Not everyone found this structure adequate. Frank B. Jewett, former president of the National Academy of Sciences, complained in 1942 that Bush had delegated too much authority to division heads who lacked experienced executive support, calling the arrangement "amateurish." Bush replied that Conant and his colleagues were doing excellent work, and that decentralization was essential for an enterprise whose value depended on the judgment of the scientists closest to the problems.

The standard OSRD contract specified a research problem, a principal investigator, a budget, and a timeline, while granting researchers substantial latitude in how they pursued the work. Bush described this approach as "giving a man his head": selecting the best scientists and trusting them to find solutions. Crucially, OSRD possessed both the authority and the funds to proceed on research projects "whether the armed services approved or not," a freedom that proved essential in cases where military officers were skeptical of novel approaches.

The arrangement represented a deliberate contrast with World War I, when scientists who wished to contribute had been "required, with rare exception, to accept military command procedures," with research priorities determined by officers who often dismissed civilian expertise. OSRD's structure ensured that while the agency was responsive to military needs, it was not subordinate to military judgment on technical matters.

=== Contractor selection ===
OSRD concentrated its funding among institutions with existing research capacity, prioritizing speed over geographic distribution or institution-building. The agency's first major task was surveying the nation's scientific resources. Jewett wrote to the presidents of 725 colleges and universities requesting information about their facilities and personnel; Conant followed up with fifty leading research institutions asking about their specific capabilities. From these responses, Wilson compiled a directory of institutional capabilities that guided contractor selection.

At the divisional level, selection worked through personal and professional networks. Contractors were typically chosen because a recognized expert in the relevant field was already on the institution's staff (Note: In Division 2 (Structural Defense and Offense), fifteen of twenty-six contracts were placed with institutions selected for the presence of a specific scientist or group of scientists, with another six following as natural extensions of existing work.) This approach reinforced the concentration of contracts at a relatively small number of institutions. Private universities and industrial laboratories entered into contracts more readily than state-funded institutions, particularly before Pearl Harbor, and scientists at slower-moving institutions often departed on loan to contractors that had entered the field earlier, further draining the pool of available researchers. By mid-war, this concentration had drawn criticism, though John Ely Burchard observed that the pattern was an inevitable consequence of selecting for expertise rather than geographic distribution.

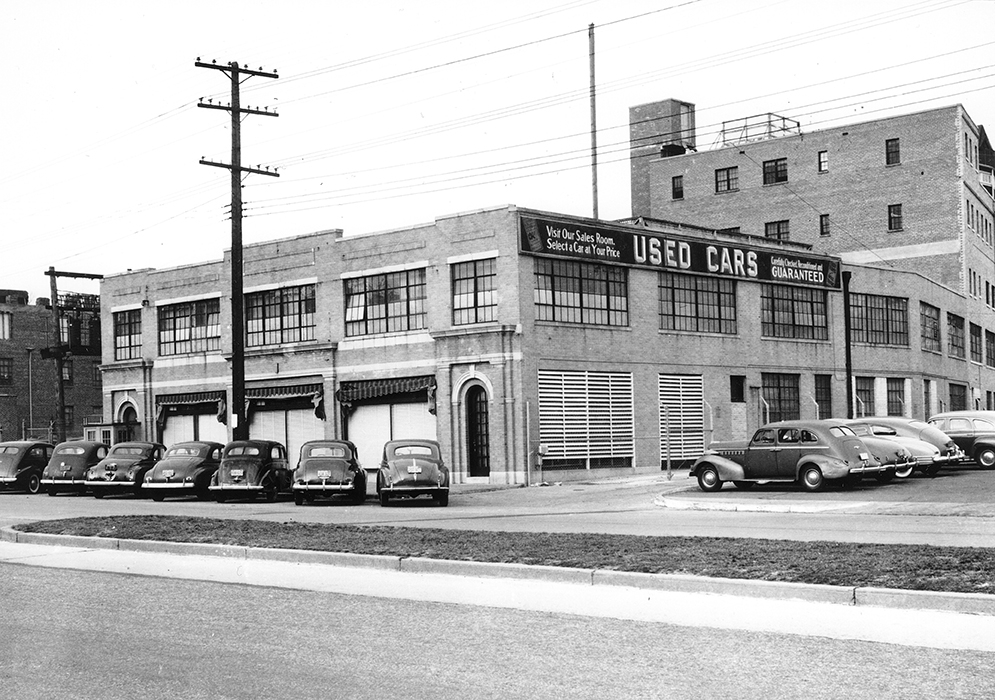
The OSRD-funded Applied Physics Laboratory began in a used car warehouse.

The sections and divisions operated in a wide variety of organizational forms. In some cases a section established a single government-owned, contractor-operated central laboratory to which broad authority was delegated, as with the MIT Radiation Laboratory and the Johns Hopkins Applied Physics Laboratory. In other cases the divisional staff exercised closer technical supervision over a network of separate but coordinated contracts. Still other divisions functioned primarily in an advisory capacity.

The result was substantial concentration. The top ten states accounted for approximately 90 percent of OSRD spending. Major recipients included MIT, Caltech, Harvard, Columbia, and the University of California, Berkeley. MIT alone received over $116 million, primarily for radar development at the Radiation Laboratory.

This concentration provoked criticism both during and after the war. Senator Harley Kilgore of West Virginia, a New Deal Democrat, argued that OSRD's funding model favored "big business and a handful of universities" at the expense of broader geographic and institutional participation. Scientists outside the OSRD network voiced similar complaints, particularly regarding MIT's privileged position. Frank Jewett reported to Bush that he had overheard scientists on a train condemning the "immoral" large allocation to MIT "and relatively little to other institutions." Bush suggested that Compton rename the Radiation Laboratory the "American University Laboratory" to make clear that it was "a cooperative university undertaking instead of an MIT undertaking."

These complaints reflected a tension between concentrating wartime scientific resources for maximum effectiveness and distributing them for broader institutional development that prefigured later debates on the same subject. Indeed, historian Larry Owens has argued that OSRD's very success proved "counterproductive" to Bush's hopes for postwar science: decentralized contracting relationships that enabled rapid mobilization took on lives of their own, fueling the proliferation of military-academic partnerships that Bush had hoped to coordinate under unified civilian oversight.

=== Government friction ===
The decentralized structure created practical difficulties that the agency's principals acknowledged openly. Security compartmentalization required formal authorization for liaison between divisions and between sections; while valuable for maintaining the confidence of military authorities that a civilian agency could keep secrets, these barriers sometimes retarded the work. Division chiefs who encountered passive or active resistance from the armed services were largely left to resolve the problem themselves, since appealing to the OSRD director for intervention was impractical in all but the most extreme cases.

Federal conflict of interest rules posed a recurring dilemma. The scientists best qualified to serve on division committees were often affiliated with the industrial firms or university contractors performing the relevant research. Early in the war these considerations were loosely applied, but as OSRD tightened its rules and increased the legal responsibilities of division members, some of the most knowledgeable experts had to be removed from their positions. Burchard concluded that had the stricter rules been imposed at the outset, "it is doubtful whether OSRD could have functioned at all," and that any future organization of the kind would need to find a way to permit qualified individuals to serve without exposure to criminal liability.

Personnel shortages worsened steadily as the war continued. Selective Service drained the supply of young scientists, competition from other NDRC projects and from the armed services' own laboratories drew away experienced researchers, and the Office of Scientific Personnel and other formal recruiting agencies proved largely ineffective at identifying qualified candidates for research positions. By 1944, the reservoir of unoccupied scientists had run dry, and contractors could take on new problems only at the expense of discontinuing existing ones.

=== Indirect cost recovery ===
A critical feature of OSRD contracts was compensation for "indirect costs," the institutional expenses such as facilities, equipment, and administrative support that could not be attributed to any single project. OSRD operated on a principle of "no-profit, no-loss": contractors should be fully reimbursed for their costs but should not profit from war work. As Bush argued, for universities to participate in the research program, OSRD had to ensure they would "break even on contracts": "Any commercial concern that did not consider overhead a part of its costs would not last long."

In 1942, OSRD established an overhead policy that allowed universities to receive indirect cost payments of 50 percent of salaries charged to contracts; industrial firms received 100 percent, a distinction justified by the fact that firms, unlike universities, were subject to taxation. This formula was acknowledged as a "rule of thumb" rather than a precise calculation, and even at the time was understood as potentially overcompensating some institutions while undercompensating others.

Calculating overhead proved contentious. While direct costs could be documented precisely, indirect costs occupied what one university comptroller called "an uncomfortably gray area." James Killian, MIT's chief administrator during the war, joked that leaving a university without profit or loss was a "metaphysical concept." Administrators and researchers often clashed over overhead's legitimacy. Scientists tended to view indirect cost recovery as an intrusion on research dollars, while university business officers considered it essential to institutional solvency.

Lacking prior exposure to government contracting, universities initially lacked standardized cost accounting procedures. OSRD audited its largest contractors to verify that payments matched actual costs. By November 1945, these audits found that approximately 51 percent of large academic and industrial contractors had received excess overhead payments, largely because the standard formulas overcompensated rapidly expanding operations. Refunds were obtained or future payments reduced. Approximately 40 percent broke even, and 9 percent had been undercompensated.

For the largest contracts, OSRD negotiated institution-specific rates. MIT president Karl Compton, a member of Bush's inner circle, recognized that the Radiation Laboratory's overhead costs grew more slowly than its rapidly expanding budget. He voluntarily reduced the lab's overhead rate from 50 percent to 30 percent in 1942, and to 10 percent by 1944. (Note: As it grew, the Radiation Laboratory constructed dedicated buildings and funded its own administration and auxiliary staffing.) A committee of university business officers later recommended rates as low as 30 percent for contracts exceeding $2 million (equivalent to $35.8M in 2025). MIT's average overhead rate for the entire war was 8.7 percent, well below the standard formula. Despite the difficulties of implementation, OSRD's philosophy of overhead—estimating unavoidable shared costs while prohibiting university contractors from profiting—became a cornerstone of postwar federal science policy.

=== Patents ===
OSRD developed two standard forms of patent agreement. Under the "long form," contractors retained title to inventions but granted the government a royalty-free license for governmental purposes. Under the "short form," used primarily with firms that had substantial preexisting patent portfolios in relevant fields, the government took title. The policy aimed to provide sufficient incentive for contractor participation while ensuring the government could use inventions for defense purposes.

== Major programs ==
OSRD coordinated research and development across numerous fields, producing technological advances that altered the course of the war. Its work ranged from radar systems to new medicines, encompassing both offensive weapons and protective measures for Allied troops.

=== Radar ===
The Radiation Laboratory at MIT became OSRD's largest program and the centerpiece of NDRC's Division 14 (Radar). Working from the British cavity magnetron demonstrated in the September 1940 Tizard Mission, the laboratory developed microwave radar technology and created over 100 different radar systems for military applications. Alfred Loomis, a lawyer-turned-physicist who had chaired the original Microwave Committee, served as chief of Division 14 when NDRC reorganized into nineteen divisions in November 1942. The laboratory grew to approximately 4,000 employees and received $110.8 million in contracts, accounting for 23 percent of all OSRD research spending and making MIT the agency's largest contractor.

Division 14 administered the radar program through a deliberately small Cambridge office, employing only an executive secretary, three or four technical aides, and support staff, while leaving contractors maximum freedom over technical planning and the conduct of research. Each OSRD contract was administered by a Scientific Officer from NDRC, responsible for technical direction, and a Contracting Officer from the OSRD executive secretary's office, responsible for fiscal and legal matters. The Radiation Laboratory accounted for nearly 80 percent of Division 14's contract activity, but the division also administered 136 contracts with 18 academic institutions and 39 industrial firms for fundamental research, component development, and preproduction work. Total Division 14 spending reached $141.7 million across the war. When Congressional appropriations fell short in 1942–1943, OSRD secured $6 million from the War and Navy Departments to avoid curtailing the program, and MIT underwrote $500,000 of laboratory payroll while funds were in transit.

The Rad Lab's major systems included the SCR-584 radar, which incorporated automatic tracking through conical scanning and achieved target location accuracy within 0.06 degrees and twenty yards in range. Produced by General Electric and Westinghouse, the SCR-584 proved decisive against German V-1 flying bombs, with antiaircraft batteries achieving approximately 74 percent effectiveness in late August 1944. Among its navigation systems were LORAN, a long-range radio navigation system that Loomis had proposed in 1940. By the end of the war, LORAN could navigate ships and planes across 30% of the earth's surface. Other developments included the H_{2}X radar, a 3-centimeter bombing system enabling precision strikes through clouds, and Microwave Early Warning (MEW) systems that controlled fighter operations during D-Day.

The scale of Division 14's production pipeline was substantial: American industry produced nearly one million radar sets worth approximately $3 billion by July 1945, and equipment designed at the Radiation Laboratory accounted for $1.46 billion of that total, nearly half of all U.S. radar procurement.

A separate laboratory for electronic countermeasures was established in 1942 under Frederick Terman, chairman of Stanford's electrical engineering department. Originally housed within the Radiation Laboratory, Terman's group moved to Harvard University in July 1942, becoming the Radio Research Laboratory. When NDRC reorganized that November, the countermeasures program was assigned to a new Division 15 (Radio Coordination), headed by C. Guy Suits of General Electric; it grew to 810 employees and generated over $300 million in service orders for equipment, more than two-thirds of which was NDRC-developed.

Both radar divisions funded field laboratories for integrating radar systems in to military use. The largest were the American British Laboratory (ABL-15) and the British Branch of the Radiation Lab (BBRL), which were both headquartered in Great Malvern at the British Telecommunications Research Establishment.

=== Proximity fuze ===
Section T, led by Merle Tuve at the Johns Hopkins University Applied Physics Laboratory, developed the radio proximity fuze—a miniaturized radio system that detonated artillery shells at optimal distance from targets. Components had to withstand acceleration forces of 20,000 times gravity and shell rotation at 475 revolutions per second.

The Navy committed $80 million for production in early 1942. Section T grew from fewer than 100 staff in April 1942 to over 700 within two years, coordinating production across more than 300 companies. At peak capacity, manufacturers produced nearly 2 million fuzes monthly. Quality control included testing every miniature tube at 20,000g in centrifuges.

The VT fuze significantly improved antiaircraft effectiveness, with operational testing showing four-fold improvements in rounds-per-kill against aircraft. Ground artillery effectiveness also increased substantially. The Combined Chiefs of Staff initially restricted use to naval operations to prevent German capture, but released it for ground use in December 1944 during the Battle of the Bulge. General George S. Patton credited the fuze as decisive in halting the German offensive.

=== Atomic fission ===
The atomic energy program came to OSRD through a series of predecessor committees. President Roosevelt had established the Advisory Committee on Uranium under Lyman Briggs of the National Bureau of Standards in 1939, following the Einstein–Szilárd letter warning that nuclear fission might be used to construct weapons. When NDRC was created in June 1940, it absorbed the Briggs committee and began funding research on chain reactions and isotope separation, though progress was slow and some NDRC members questioned whether the uncertain prospect justified committing scarce physicists to the effort.

Two developments in 1941 transformed the program. The British MAUD Committee reported in July that an effective uranium weapon could be constructed using a feasible quantity of uranium-235. Independently, a National Academy of Sciences review committee chaired by Arthur Compton concluded in November that an atomic bomb was achievable and should be pursued urgently. Bush briefed President Roosevelt in October. Roosevelt authorized an expanded program and restricted policy decisions to a small group consisting of himself, Vice President Wallace, Secretary of War Stimson, General George C. Marshall, Bush, and Conant.

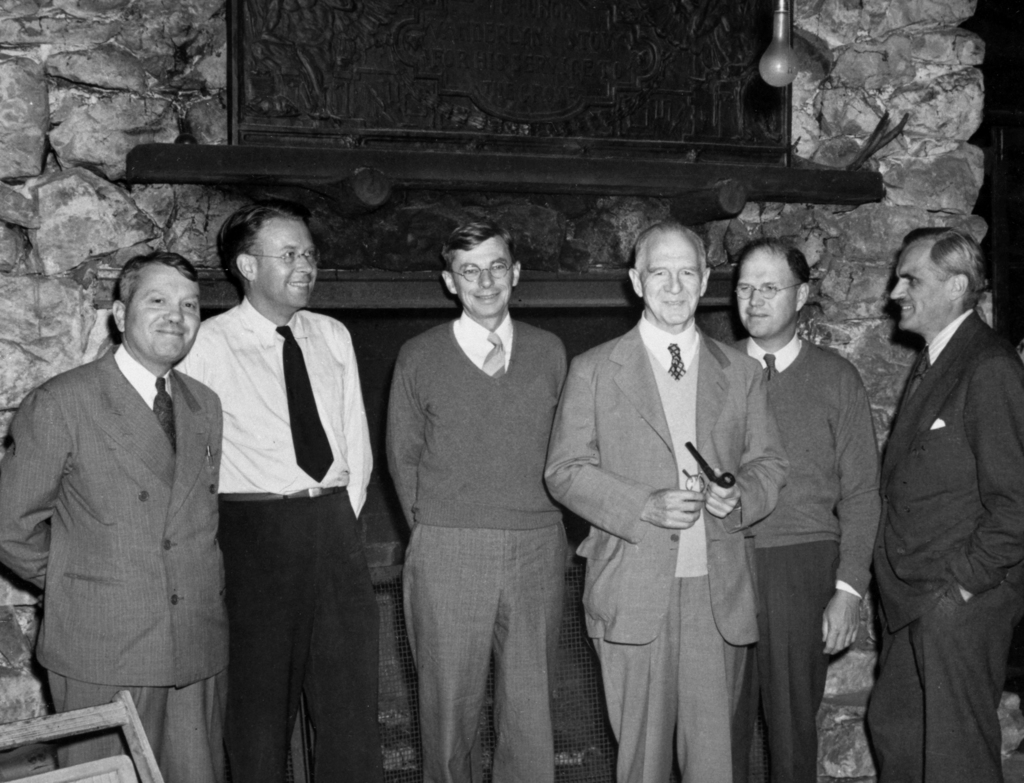
S-1 Committee at Bohemian Grove, September 1942

After Pearl Harbor, OSRD reorganized the uranium work outside the regular NDRC structure, designating it Section S-1 and dividing research among program chiefs at Chicago, Berkeley, and Columbia. As the program's scale grew beyond what a civilian agency could manage, Bush replaced S-1 with the smaller S-1 Executive Committee in June 1942, chaired by Conant, which coordinated the division of labor with the newly created Manhattan District. Most OSRD contracts were terminated by March 1943 and transferred to the Army. After July 1942, all funding came from Army transfers rather than OSRD appropriations. Total OSRD expenditure on atomic energy was approximately $18.1 million, laying the groundwork for Army expenditures of roughly $2 billion.

Although OSRD formally left atomic energy to Army management, its leaders remained central to the project. Bush served on General Leslie Groves's Scientific Advisory Committee and on the Military Policy Committee that directed the Manhattan Project; Conant became Groves' principal scientific adviser; and Richard C. Tolman served as a key member of Groves' staff. Because of the project's extraordinary implications, Roosevelt directed that all atomic energy patent rights be vested in the government, and OSRD's S-1 contractors agreed to retroactive conversion of their contracts accordingly.

=== Rockets and jet propulsion ===
At the California Institute of Technology's Jet Propulsion Laboratory, physicist Charles C. Lauritsen directed rocket weapon development. By 1944–45, the Navy was procuring approximately $100 million monthly in rockets based on Caltech research, with $57 million transferred from Navy funds to OSRD. The laboratory developed the High Velocity Aircraft Rocket (HVAR) and other systems.

=== Penicillin mass production ===
Working in London, Alexander Fleming first observed penicillin's antibacterial properties in 1928, but was unable to isolate the compound in usable quantities. A decade later, Howard Florey and Ernst Chain at the University of Oxford developed methods to purify and concentrate penicillin, and in 1940–1941 conducted animal experiments and limited clinical trials demonstrating its effectiveness and low toxicity. By the spring of 1941, however, nearly two years of work had yielded only enough to treat five patients.

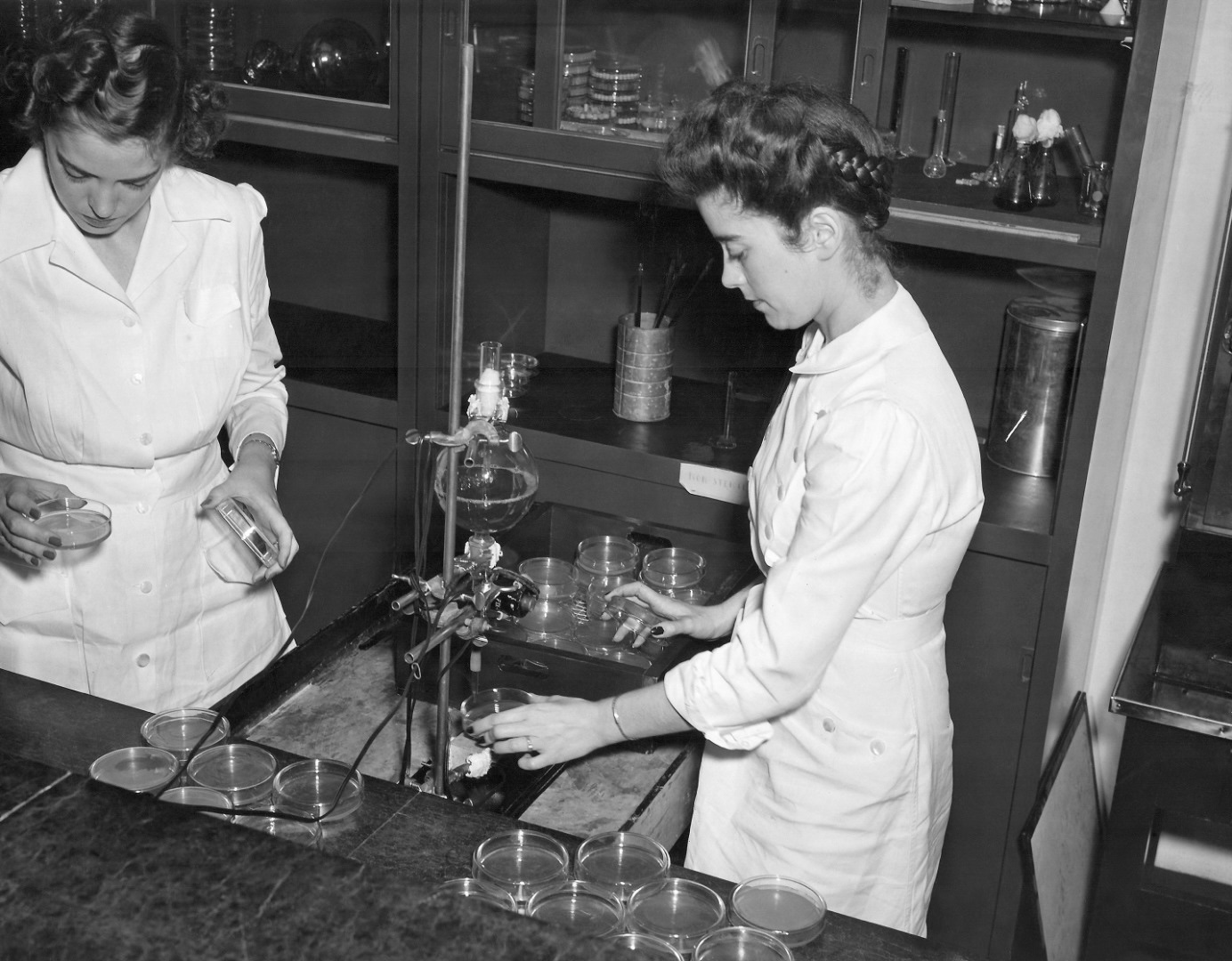
USDA scientists devised scalable penicillin production; CMR coordinated commercialization

British pharmaceutical firms lacked the capacity for large-scale production during wartime, and Florey traveled to the United States in the summer of 1941 to seek assistance, supported by a grant from the Rockefeller Foundation. After visiting the USDA's Northern Regional Research Laboratory in Peoria, Illinois, and several pharmaceutical firms, Florey consulted Richards of the Committee on Medical Research. Although the problem was one of production rather than research, Richards chose to act on it.

In October and December 1941, Richards arranged meetings among the Peoria laboratory, the National Research Council's Division of Chemistry, and pharmaceutical firms including Merck, Pfizer & Company, Squibb & Sons, and Lederle Laboratories. The firms agreed to share findings through CMR, while the Peoria laboratory reported directly to all participants. Apart from some funding transferred to the NRRL, the research and construction of pilot plants were conducted at the participants' own expense. CMR's role was to encourage collaboration, coordinate results, and arrange construction priorities through the War Production Board.

The NRRL made several breakthroughs essential to large-scale production, including the addition of corn steep liquor to the culture medium, which increased yields tenfold, and a worldwide search for superior mold strains conducted with help from Air Transport Command personnel. Researchers also developed submerged fermentation methods using large vats in place of the surface-culture techniques Florey's team had used, solving problems of aeration, mixing, and contamination control at industrial scale. Meanwhile, CMR organized the clinical evaluation of the drug, directing the first patient treatment in March 1942 and managing the allocation of scarce supplies through the National Research Council. By March 1943, 200 cases had been treated.

In May 1943, the War Production Board provided top-priority ratings for 21 production plants at a total cost of approximately $20 million; most were operational within six months. The Department of Justice granted producers a waiver from antitrust prosecution to facilitate information sharing. Monthly production rose from 425 million units in June 1943 to 646,818 million units by June 1945, while the wholesale price of a 100,000-unit package fell from $20 to less than one dollar.

=== Antimalarial drugs ===
With Japanese conquest of quinine-producing regions, CMR established a research program to develop synthetic antimalarials and evaluate atabrine (quinacrine). Coordinated by the Board for Co-ordination of Malarial Studies from December 1943, over seventy investigations examined more than 14,000 compounds in animals and over 80 in human trials involving prisoner volunteers. Research demonstrated that atabrine, properly dosed, effectively treated falciparum malaria. The program developed chloroquine, which proved significantly more effective than quinine and allowed treatment in two days rather than seven.

=== Medical research and insecticides ===
CMR funded diverse medical research, spending $1.4 million on insect and rodent control that identified DDT as an effective insecticide against disease-carrying mosquitoes and lice. DDT application prevented typhus epidemics in liberated areas of Europe. Additional programs addressed blood substitutes ($1.7 million), wound and burn treatments ($1.3 million), and other medical challenges.

== Budget and finances ==
OSRD received funding from three sources: direct appropriations from Congress, transfers from the Army and Navy, and allocations from the President's emergency fund.

OSRD Funding by Source and Fiscal Year (US$ '000)
Fiscal Year	Allocations	Transfers	Appropriations	Total
1941	4,597	1,585	—	6,182
1942	3,865	35,782	—	39,647
1943	—	31,329	111,084	142,413
1944	2,618	30,313	129,583	162,514
1945	2,783	66,130	98,560	167,473
1946*	6,585	11,269	—	17,854
Total	20,450	176,408	339,226	536,084

*Through June 30, 1946

Of the total $536 million obligated, approximately $11.1 million (2 percent) was used for administrative expenses; the remainder funded research contracts and related activities. Major program expenditures included approximately $24.7 million for medical research through CMR, $13 million for atomic energy research (before transfer to the Manhattan Project in 1943), and $26.4 million for the proximity fuze program (Section T). In 2025 dollars, OSRD's total expenditure of $536 million would be equivalent to approximately 9.6 billion, representing a substantial but focused investment in military technology.
