= National Defense Research Committee =

United States Government agency (1940–1947)

- NDRC
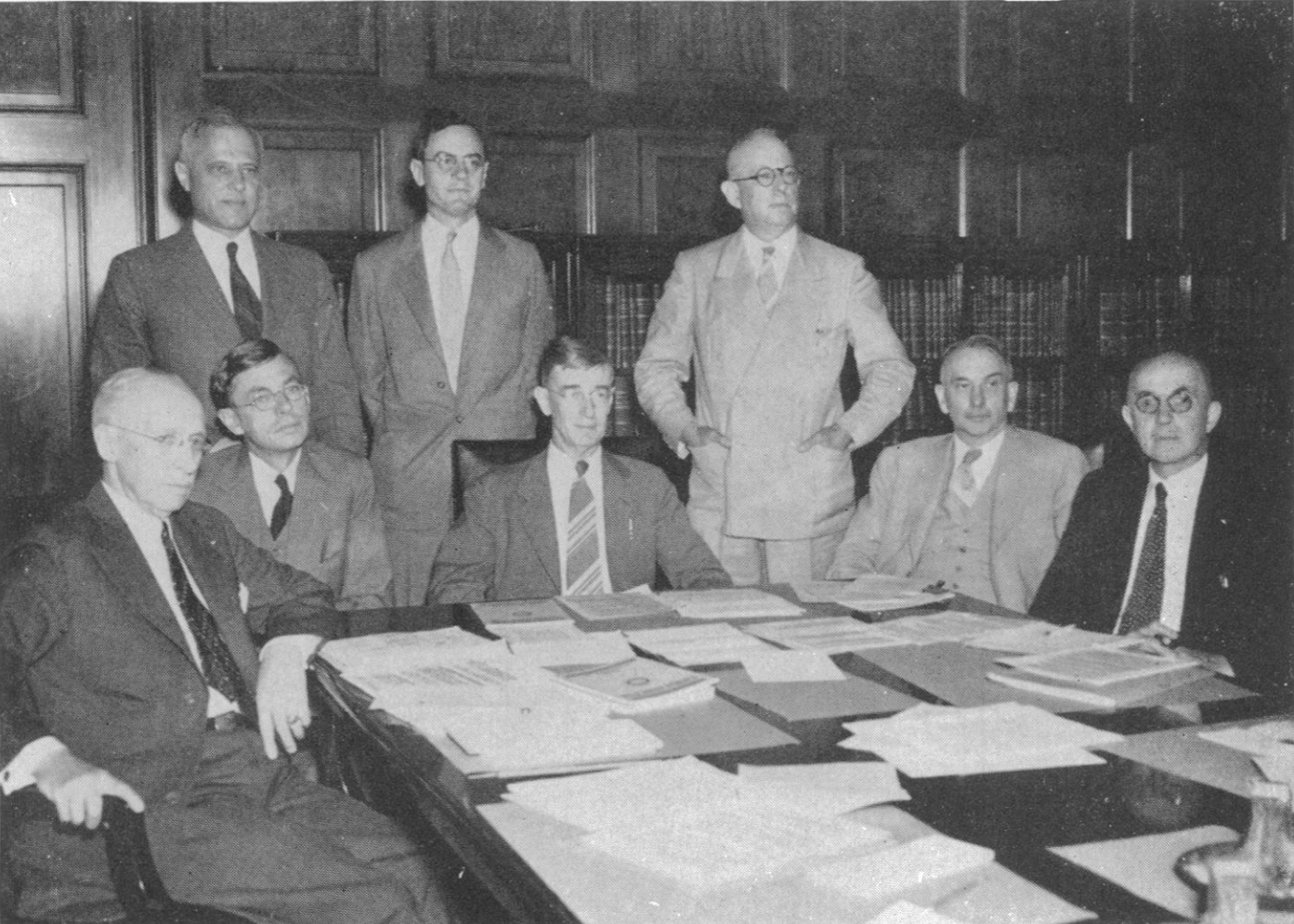
- First meeting of the NDRC, July 2, 1940.

Agency overview
- Formed: June 27, 1940
- Dissolved: January 20, 1947
- Superseding agency: Office of Scientific Research and Development
- Jurisdiction: United States Government
- Headquarters: Carnegie Institution of Washington, Washington, D.C.
- Agency executives: Vannevar Bush (1940–1941), Chairman (autonomous period); James B. Conant (1941–1947), Chairman (under OSRD)
- Parent agency: Council of National Defense (1940–1941); Office of Scientific Research and Development (1941–1947)
- Key document: Council of National Defense Order (June 27, 1940)

The National Defense Research Committee (NDRC) was a United States government body created on June 27, 1940, to coordinate civilian scientific research for military purposes in the period before American entry into World War II.

During the interwar period, relations between the military services and civilian scientists had largely broken down, and the existing advisory bodies lacked the funding and authority to bridge the gap. Vannevar Bush, an engineer and science administrator who chaired the committee, secured President Roosevelt's approval for the new agency in a meeting that lasted less than fifteen minutes.

The NDRC introduced the use of government contracts with universities and industrial laboratories to conduct military research, an approach that kept scientists in their own institutions rather than conscripting them into government service. During its year of autonomous operation, the committee initiated programs in microwave radar, the proximity fuze, and early atomic weapons research, giving the United States almost eighteen months of military research and development before Pearl Harbor.

On June 28, 1941, the NDRC was absorbed into the newly created Office of Scientific Research and Development (OSRD) as a subordinate advisory body, a role it held until its dissolution on January 20, 1947. The contract system the NDRC established became the template for postwar federal support of scientific research, shaping institutions including the Office of Naval Research, the Atomic Energy Commission, and the National Science Foundation.

== Background ==
During World War I, efforts to apply scientific expertise to military problems had been hampered by poor coordination between civilian researchers and the armed services. The National Academy of Sciences and its National Research Council, created in 1916 to advise government agencies on scientific questions, operated on the assumption that the military services would identify their own needs and then request assistance. The NRC's lack of independent funding and authority had left it unable to accomplish much for national defense before the United States entered the war in 1917. Relations between the Council and the military had never fully recovered, and by the interwar period the two services had retreated into largely separate research programs, neither making serious efforts to draw on the growing corps of civilian experts in fields such as electronics and nuclear physics.

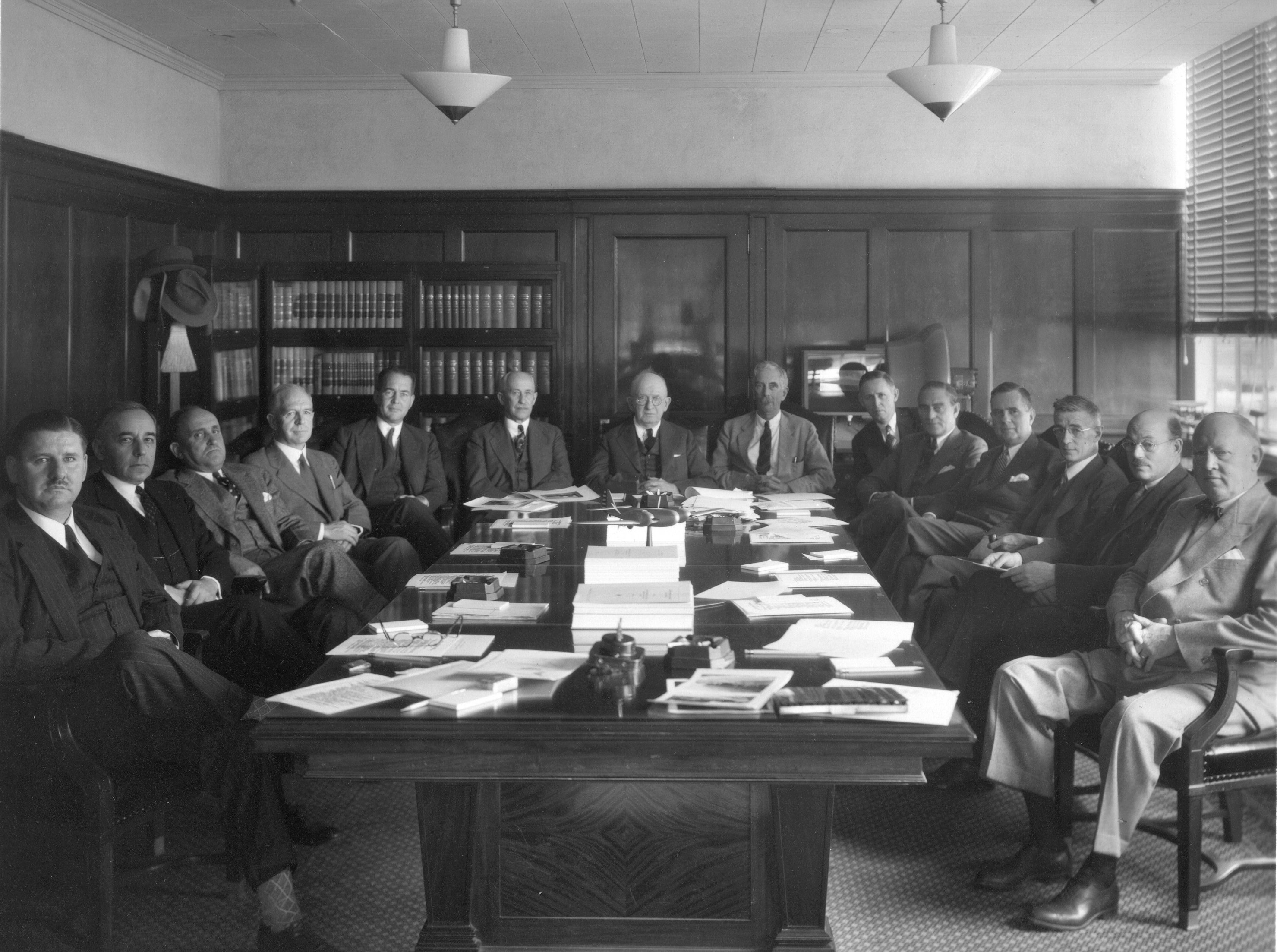
NACA committee, 1938

By the late 1930s, Bush and several fellow science administrators believed that this model was inadequate for a war that would be shaped by rapidly advancing technology. Military officers, in their view, were not sufficiently familiar with recent scientific developments to know what might be possible; what was needed was an organization that could assess military requirements independently and propose solutions the services had not imagined. Bush drew on his experience as chairman of the National Advisory Committee for Aeronautics (NACA), which had served during the interwar period as a liaison between civilian science and the military in aviation research. He envisioned a similar intermediary body, but with broader scope and the authority to fund its own research through contracts.

In informal discussions during 1939 and 1940, Bush, Karl T. Compton (president of MIT), James B. Conant (president of Harvard), and Frank B. Jewett (president of both the National Academy of Sciences and Bell Labs) agreed that the existing military laboratory system would not produce the novel weapons a modern war would demand. All four were distinguished scientists who had advanced to administrative positions, and all were Republicans who were wary of expanding government power, yet they were united in the conviction that civilian scientific leadership was essential for national defense. Bush in particular was no friend of the New Deal and a great admirer of Herbert Hoover, yet he was persuaded that effective mobilization required a new federal agency operating directly under presidential authority. As he later recalled: "I knew that you couldn't get anything done in that damn town unless you organized under the wing of the President."

== Establishment ==
On June 12, 1940, with the fall of France imminent, Bush secured a meeting with President Roosevelt through presidential advisor Harry Hopkins. Bush brought a single page describing the proposed agency. Roosevelt approved it in under fifteen minutes. The president signed a letter on June 15 authorizing the creation of the committee and appointing Bush as chairman. The letter specified that the NDRC was not intended to replace Army and Navy research but to "supplement this activity by extending the research base and enlisting the aid of the scientists."

The NDRC was formally established on June 27, 1940, by an order of the Council of National Defense, a dormant World War I-era body of six Cabinet secretaries that was briefly revived to provide legal authority for the new committee. This mechanism allowed Bush to begin operations using presidential emergency funds without waiting for a congressional appropriation. Bush later acknowledged the unorthodox nature of the maneuver, recalling that the creation of the NDRC "was an end run, a grab by which a small company of scientists and engineers, acting outside established channels, got hold of the authority and money for the program of developing new weapons."

=== British scientific exchange ===
The NDRC received a major stimulus in September 1940 when the Tizard Mission, a British scientific delegation led by Sir Henry Tizard, arrived in Washington carrying detailed information about British advances in radar, fire control, underwater detection, and explosives. The British were authorized to share virtually any military secret in exchange for access to American research. Both sides found the other further advanced than expected, though as Baxter noted, in the early period of the exchange the British contributed more than they received.

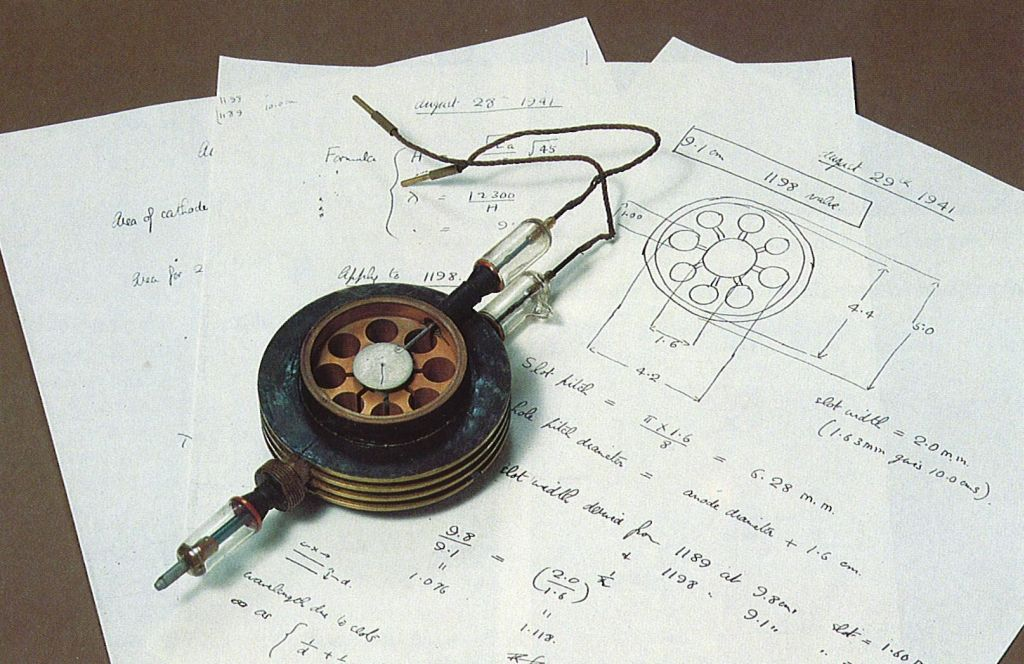
The Birmingham cavity magnetron

The most consequential item the mission brought was the cavity magnetron, a compact and powerful microwave transmitter developed by British physicists at the University of Birmingham. American radar research at the time was limited to relatively long wavelengths; the magnetron removed the principal obstacle to developing short-wave microwave radar, which could provide far greater resolution. The device was so novel that even leading physicists were initially confounded. When the disassembled magnetron was placed on a table at a meeting of the NDRC's Microwave Committee, I. I. Rabi told his colleagues it was simply "a kind of whistle," but when Edward U. Condon asked him to explain how a whistle worked, Rabi could not produce a satisfactory answer. Within weeks, the NDRC's Microwave Committee, chaired by Alfred Lee Loomis, arranged for MIT to establish the Radiation Laboratory to exploit the new technology.

In February 1941, Roosevelt sent Conant to London to formalize the exchange and establish a permanent NDRC liaison office, headed by Frederick L. Hovde. The British reciprocated with a scientific office in Washington. This transatlantic collaboration, which continued throughout the war under the OSRD, provided ongoing access to British combat experience and accelerated the development of American countermeasures and weapons systems.

== Research programs ==
During its year of autonomous operation (June 1940 – June 1941), the NDRC initiated several research programs that became central to the Allied war effort. The committee received approximately $6.5 million in emergency funds out of a requested $10 million.

=== Radar ===
When the NDRC was established in June 1940, American radar development was scattered across military laboratories working at long wavelengths. Compton's Division D created a Microwave Committee (Section D-1) under Alfred Lee Loomis to survey the field and explore shorter wavelengths, which promised smaller antennas and sharper resolution. The committee, which included representatives from Bell Labs, General Electric, RCA, Westinghouse, and Sperry, as well as Ernest O. Lawrence from Berkeley, quickly identified microwave radar as a high priority. But it faced the same obstacle as British radar research: no existing transmitter could generate adequate power at centimeter wavelengths.

In September 1940, the arrival of the cavity magnetron removed the technical obstacle. Because the NDRC lacked authority to operate laboratories directly, it contracted with MIT to host the new facility, choosing an academic setting over an offer from Bell Labs. Within weeks, Loomis arranged for MIT to establish the Radiation Laboratory, which opened on November 11, 1940, with an initial staff of about thirty physicists. (Note: Compton agreed to host the laboratory at MIT, but had reservations about the Microwave Committee's proposal and recused himself from the formal decision.) By the time the NDRC was absorbed into the OSRD in June 1941, the laboratory had demonstrated a working airborne radar set and had become the committee's largest single research commitment. When the NDRC reorganized in December 1942, radar research was consolidated as Division 14, with Loomis as chief.

=== Uranium research ===
The Advisory Committee on Uranium, established in 1939 under the National Bureau of Standards following the Einstein–Szilárd letter, had made limited progress before being placed under NDRC authority by Roosevelt's June 15, 1940, letter. Bush reorganized the committee into a scientific body and removed its military members, giving it independent access to NDRC funding. Progress remained slow until the British MAUD Committee reported in mid-1941 that an atomic bomb was feasible. After the creation of the OSRD, the uranium program was reorganized as the S–1 Section and eventually transferred to the Army Corps of Engineers as the Manhattan Project.

=== Proximity fuze ===
Section T of the original NDRC, operating at the Carnegie Institution's Department of Terrestrial Magnetism under Merle Tuve, began development of a proximity fuze for artillery shells in the summer of 1940. The program later moved to the Johns Hopkins University Applied Physics Laboratory, which was created specifically to house the expanded project.

=== Underwater sound ===
The NDRC established the Underwater Sound Laboratory at New London, Connecticut, which conducted research on sonar and other antisubmarine detection technologies.

== Organization ==
=== Committee membership ===
The NDRC consisted of eight members, including the chairman. Two served by virtue of their offices: the President of the National Academy of Sciences and the Commissioner of Patents. The Secretary of War and the Secretary of the Navy each designated one military representative. The remaining four civilian members were appointed directly. All members served without compensation. Irvin Stewart, who directed the National Research Council's Committee on Scientific Aids to Learning, was appointed NDRC secretary at the first meeting on July 2.

The civilian members had close personal and professional relationships. All had collaborated since 1937 on the NRC's Committee on Scientific Aids to Learning, and they had used those meetings to discuss informally the deteriorating international situation and its implications for American preparedness. Bush had served as Compton's vice president at MIT before becoming head of the Carnegie Institution in 1939. Jewett, a trustee of both MIT and the Carnegie Institution, had been instrumental in recruiting Compton to the MIT presidency.

The original members were:

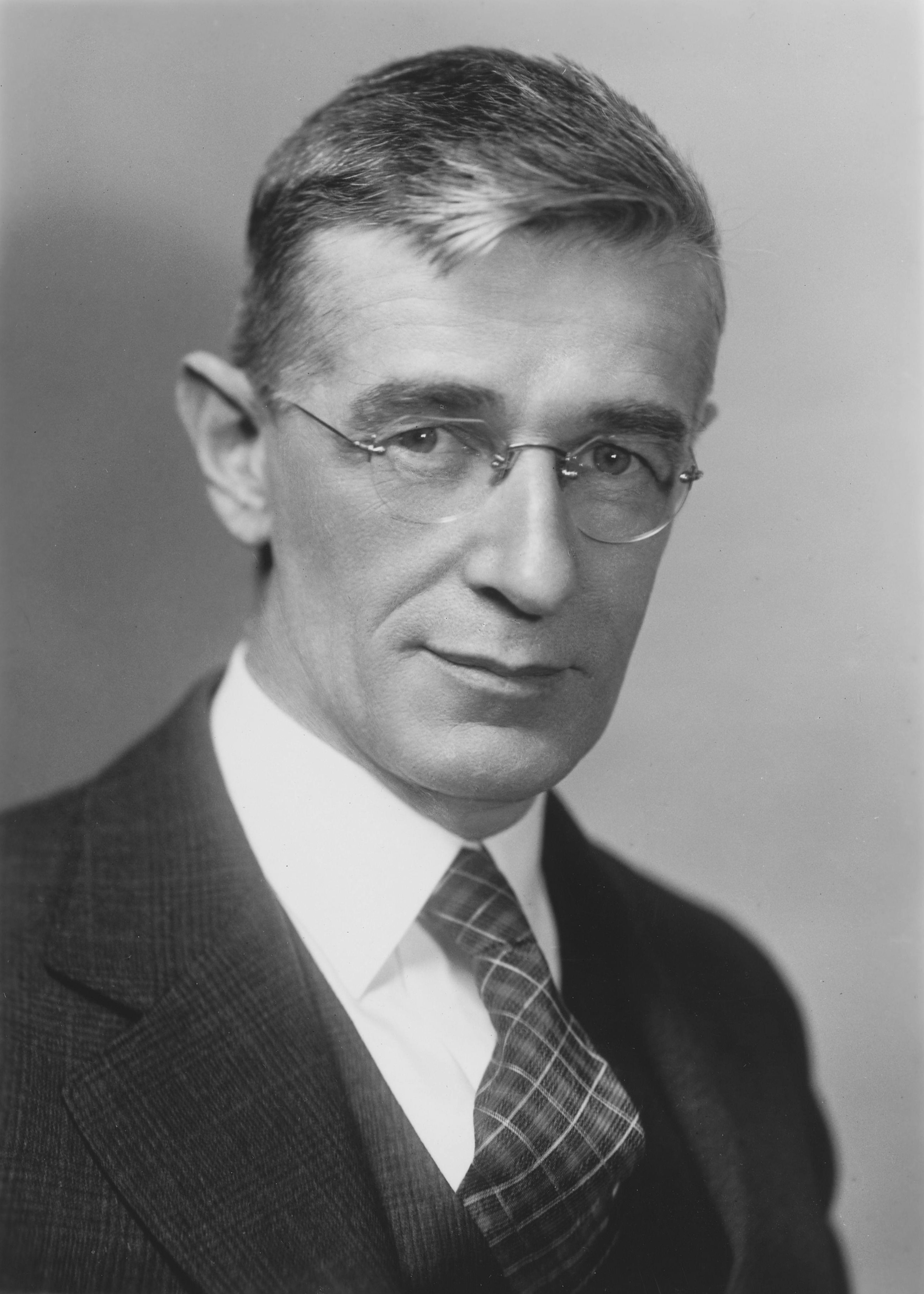
Vannevar Bush
President, Carnegie Institution of Washington
Chairman

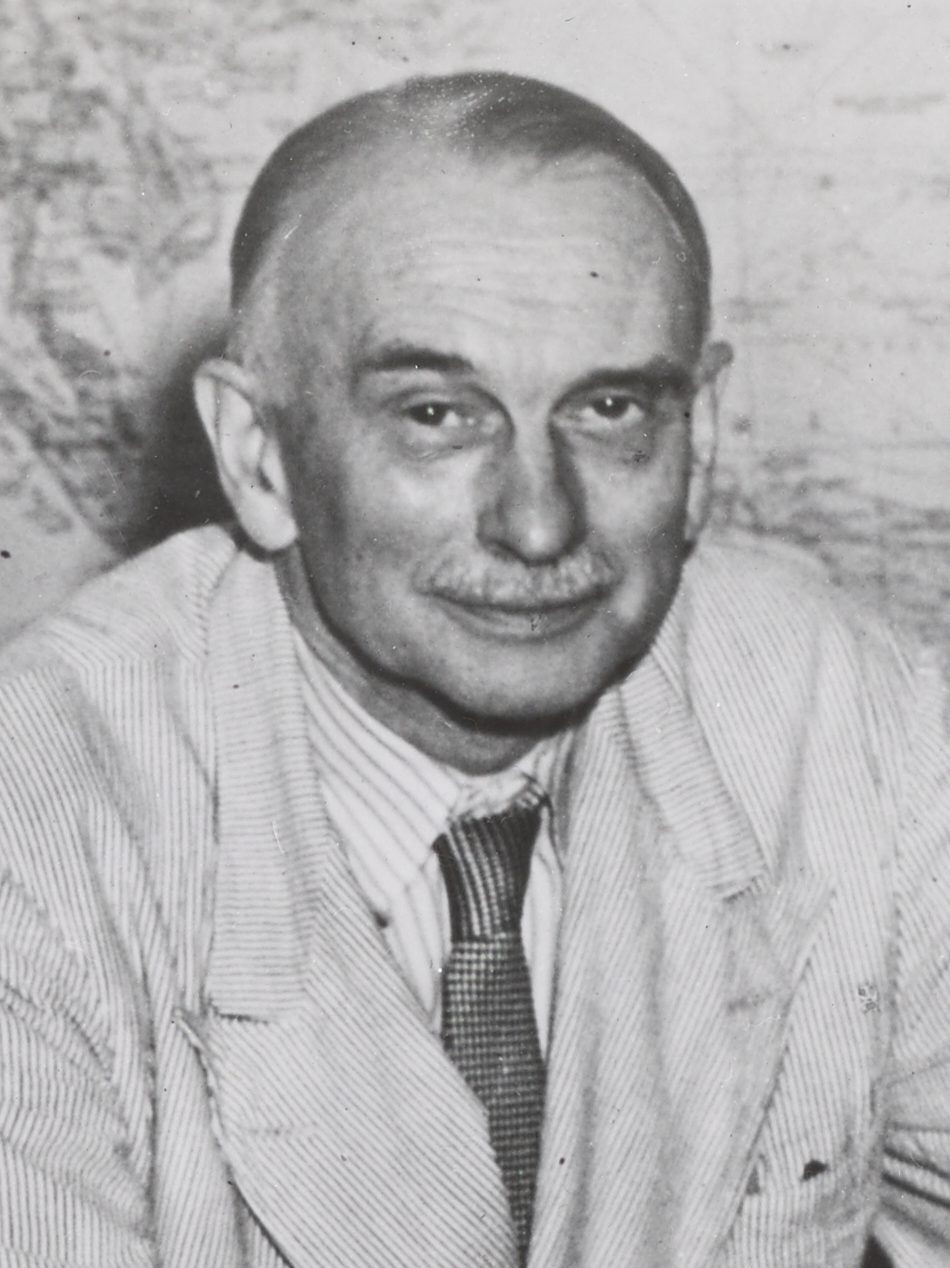
Richard C. Tolman
Professor, Caltech
Vice-Chairman; Division A (Armor and Ordnance)

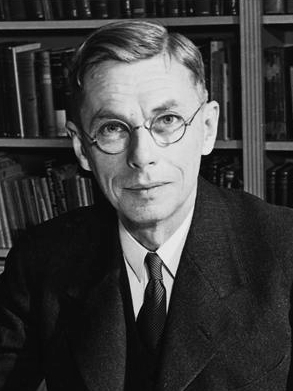
James B. Conant
President, Harvard University
Division B (Bombs, Fuels, Gases, Chemical Problems)

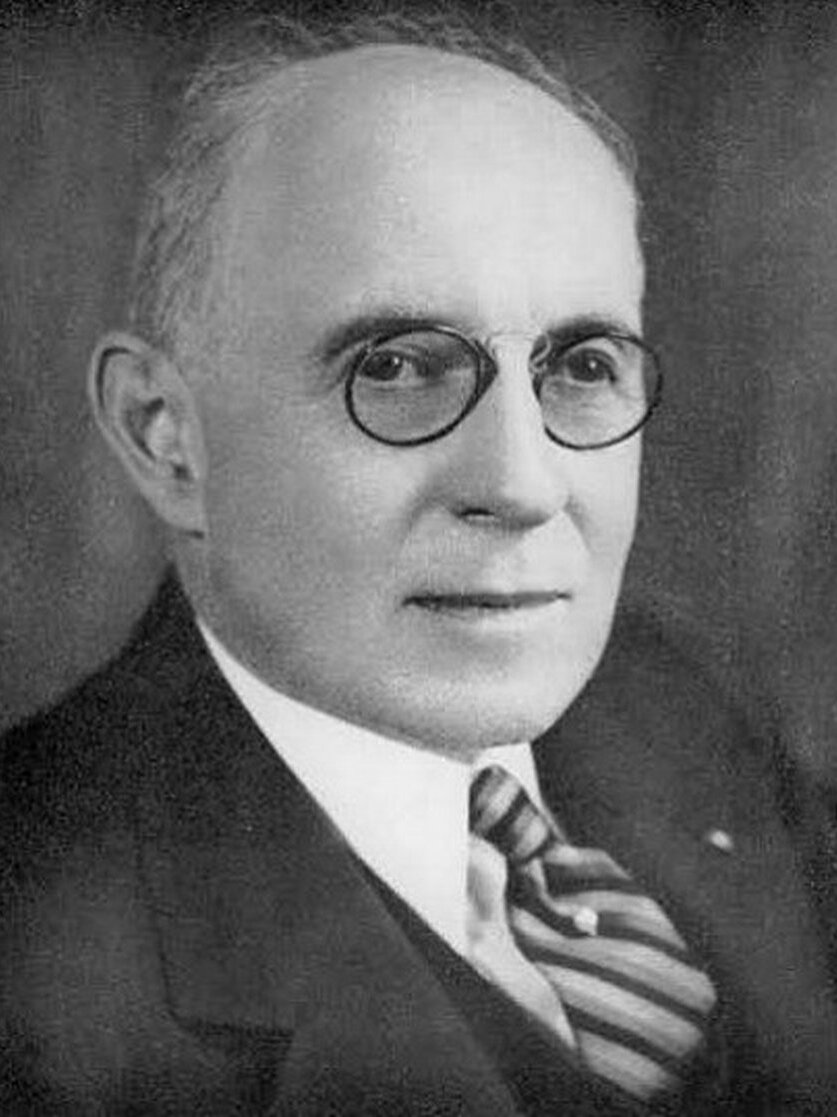
Frank B. Jewett
President, National Academy of Sciences and Bell Labs
Division C (Communication and Transportation)

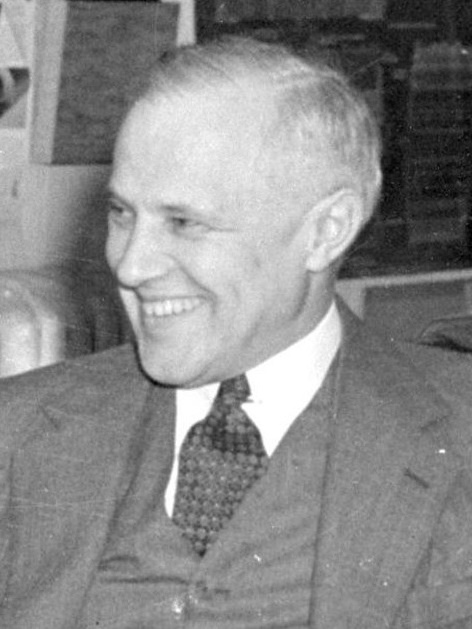
Karl T. Compton
President, MIT
Division D (Detection, Controls, Instruments)

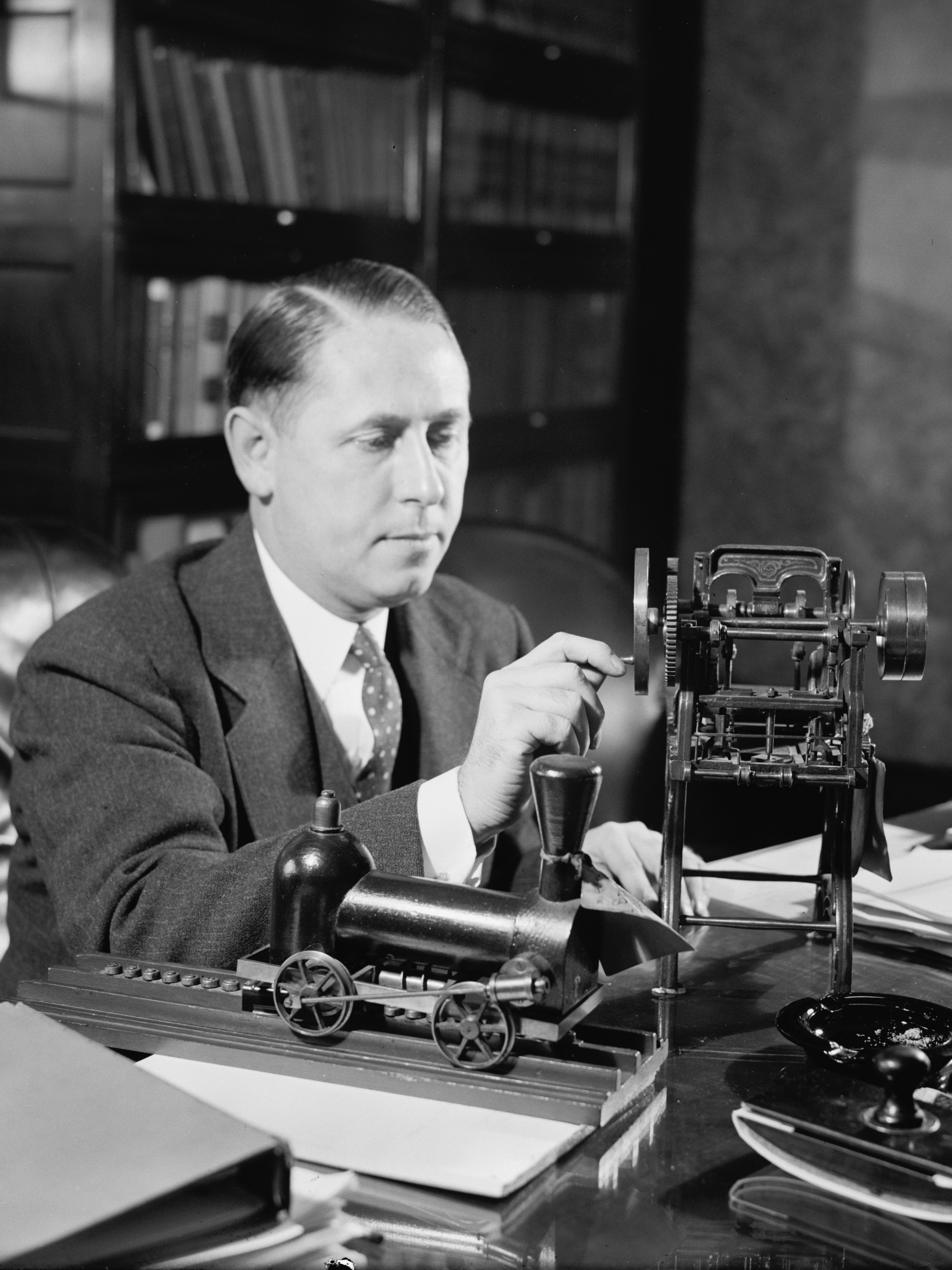
Conway P. Coe
Commissioner of Patents
Division E (Patents and Inventions)

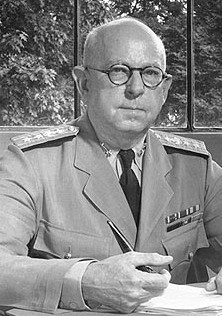
Rear Admiral Harold G. Bowen
Navy (ex officio)

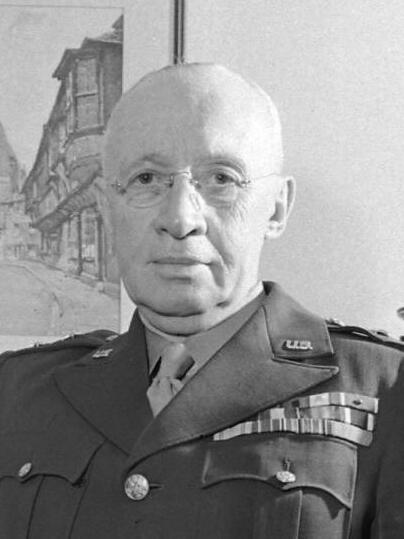
Brigadier General George V. Strong
Army (ex officio) (Note: Brigadier General R. C. Moore replaced Strong as Army representative on January 17, 1941.)

=== Divisions and the contract system ===
Bush organized the NDRC along what he called a "pyramidal structure" designed to keep scientific decisions in the hands of scientists. Each civilian committee member served as chairman of a major division, and each division chairman established specialized sections as needed. Research was conducted at the section level, where scientists and engineers worked with representatives of the armed services. Policy, administration, and budgetary decisions were handled separately at higher levels.

The organizational structure changed constantly as new problems arose. By June 1941, these five divisions had spawned dozens of specialized sections.

The NDRC's total expenditure during its first fiscal year (1940–41) was approximately $6 million. In the following year, after absorption into the OSRD, expenditures grew to roughly $40 million, and by the third year the appropriation for the entire OSRD had reached over $140 million, with additional funds transferred from the Army and Navy for specific projects. This rapid growth drove the December 1942 reorganization, in which the original five lettered divisions were replaced by nineteen numbered divisions. Many of the old sections became divisions without change of scope, but in other cases research that had grown up across two or more of the original divisions was regrouped.

Detailed NDRC divisional structure, June 1941
- Division A (Armor and Ordnance) – Richard C. Tolman, Chairman; Charles C. Lauritsen, Vice-Chairman
  - Section B (Structural Defense)
  - Section H (Investigations on Propulsion)
  - Section S (Terminal Ballistics)
  - Section T (Proximity Fuzes for Shells)
  - Section E (Fuzes and Guided Projectiles)
- Division B (Bombs, Fuels, Gases, Chemical Problems) – James B. Conant, Chairman
  - Synthetic Problems – Roger Adams, Vice-Chairman
    - Section A-1 (Explosives)
    - Section A-2 (Synthetic Organics)
    - Section A-3 (Detection of Persistent Agents)
    - Section A-4 (Toxicity)
  - Physical Chemical Problems – W. K. Lewis, Vice-Chairman
    - Section L-1 (Aerosols)
    - Section L-2 (Protective Coatings)
    - Section L-3 (Special Inorganic Problems)
    - Section L-4 (Nitrocellulose)
    - Section L-5 (Paint Removers)
    - Section L-6 (Higher Oxides)
    - Section L-7 (Oxygen Storage)
    - Section L-8 (Gas Drying)
    - Section L-9 (Metallurgical Problems)
    - Section L-10 (Exhaust Disposal)
    - Section L-11 (Absorbents)
    - Section L-12 (Oxygen for Airplanes)
    - Section L-13 (Hydraulic Fluids)
  - Miscellaneous Chemical Problems
    - Section C-1 (Automotive Fuels; Special Problems)
    - Section C-2 (Pyrotechnics)
    - Section C-3 (Special Problems)
- Division C (Communication and Transportation) – Frank B. Jewett, Chairman; C. B. Jolliffe, Hartley Rowe, R. D. Booth, and J. T. Tate, Vice-Chairmen
  - Section C-1 (Communications)
  - Section C-2 (Transportation)
  - Section C-3 (Mechanical and Electrical Equipment)
  - Section C-4 (Submarine Studies)
  - Section C-5 (Sound Sources)
- Division D (Detection, Controls, Instruments) – Karl T. Compton, Chairman; Alfred Lee Loomis, Vice-Chairman
  - Section D-1 (Detection)
  - Section D-2 (Controls)
  - Section D-3 (Instruments)
  - Section D-4 (Heat Radiation)
- Division E (Patents and Inventions) – Conway P. Coe, Chairman

The Advisory Committee on Uranium, chaired by Lyman Briggs, reported directly to the chairman of the NDRC and does not appear in the divisional structure above.

== Creation of the OSRD ==
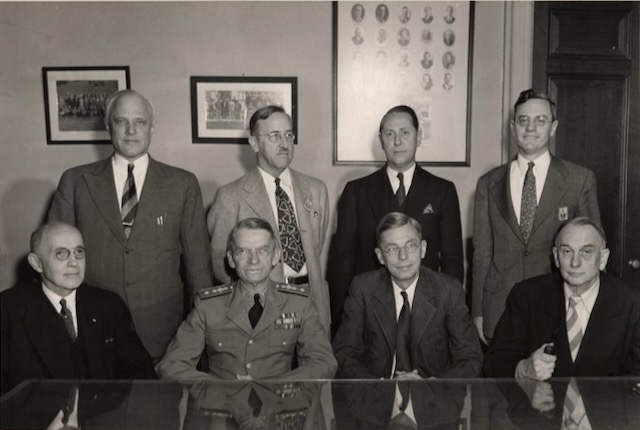
NDRC committee meeting, circa 1944

By mid-1941, the NDRC's limitations had become apparent in three areas. First, the committee's mandate covered research, but not the development phase that bridged laboratory findings and production. Neither universities nor the armed services had strong ability to cover the engineering work, creating what Stewart described as a "substantial gap." Second, there was little machinery for coordinating the research programs of the NDRC, the military services, and the NACA. Third, no provision existed for stimulating research in military medicine, a need that had become increasingly urgent.

At Bush's urging, President Roosevelt signed Executive Order 8807 on June 28, 1941, establishing the Office of Scientific Research and Development within the Office for Emergency Management of the Executive Office of the President. OSRD received direct congressional appropriations rather than relying on discretionary presidential emergency funds, placing its operations on firmer legal footing. The addition of "development" to the new agency's title reflected the deliberate expansion of scope.

Under the OSRD, the NDRC's role changed fundamentally. As a committee of the Council of National Defense, it had possessed the authority to approve and fund research contracts; as a committee of the OSRD, it could only recommend actions to the director. Bush, now OSRD director, appointed Conant as the new NDRC chairman and Tolman as vice-chairman. In practice, Bush accepted most of the committee's recommendations, though Stewart emphasized that the director was not a "rubber stamp" and would return proposals for further consideration when they were unclear or unconvincing.

=== Reorganization of 1942 ===
The first and only major reorganization of the NDRC's internal structure came in December 1942, when the original five lettered divisions were replaced by nineteen numbered divisions, an Applied Mathematics Panel under Warren Weaver, and (from 1943) an Applied Psychology Panel. The reorganization reflected the enormous growth in the scope of NDRC-administered research and the need for more specialized technical management.

NDRC divisions after the December 1942 reorganization

| Division | Subject | Chief(s) |
|---|---|---|
| 1 | Ballistics Research | L. H. Adams |
| 2 | Effects of Impact and Explosion | John E. Burchard (1942–1944); E. Bright Wilson (1944–1946) |
| 3 | Rocket Ordnance | John T. Tate (1942–1943); Frederick L. Hovde (1943–1946) |
| 4 | Ordnance Accessories | Alexander Ellett |
| 5 | New Missiles | H. B. Richmond (1942–1945); Hugh H. Spencer (1945–1946) |
| 6 | Subsurface Warfare | John T. Tate |
| 7 | Fire Control | Harold L. Hazen |
| 8 | Explosives | George Kistiakowsky (1942–1944); Ralph A. Connor (1944–1946) |
| 9 | Chemistry | Walter R. Kirner |
| 10 | Absorbents and Aerosols | W. A. Noyes, Jr. |
| 11 | Chemical Engineering | R. P. Russell (1942–1943); E. P. Stevenson (1943–1945); H. M. Chadwell (1945–1946) |
| 12 | Transportation Development | Hartley Rowe |
| 13 | Electrical Communication | C. B. Jolliffe (1942–1944); Haraden Pratt (1944–1945) |
| 14 | Radar | Alfred Lee Loomis |
| 15 | Radio Coordination | C. Guy Suits |
| 16 | Optics | George R. Harrison |
| 17 | Physics | Paul E. Klopsteg (1942–1945); George R. Harrison (1945–1946) |
| 18 | War Metallurgy | Clyde Williams |
| 19 | Miscellaneous Weapons | H. M. Chadwell |
| Applied Mathematics Panel | | Warren Weaver |
| Applied Psychology Panel | | W. S. Hunter (1943–1945); Charles W. Bray (1945–1946) |

== Demobilization ==
The NDRC continued to meet regularly through the end of the war in Europe. After the German surrender in May 1945, it oversaw the orderly termination and transfer of research projects to the armed services or to other agencies. The committee held its final meeting on January 20, 1947.

== See also ==
- DUKW – amphibious vehicle
- Project Pigeon
