= Applied Mathematics Panel =

The Applied Mathematics Panel (AMP) was created at the end of 1942 as a division of the National Defense Research Committee (NDRC) within the Office of Scientific Research and Development (OSRD) in order to solve mathematical problems related to the military effort in World War II, particularly those of the other NDRC divisions.

The panel's headquarters were in Manhattan, and it was directed by Warren Weaver, formerly of NDRC Division 7, Fire Control. It contracted projects out to various research groups, notably at Princeton and Columbia Universities.

In addition to work immediately relevant to the war effort, mathematicians involved with the panel also pursued problems of interest to them without contracts from outside organizations. Most notably, Abraham Wald developed the statistical technique of sequential analysis while working for AMP.

AMP was formally disbanded in 1946.
