= George R. Harrison =

American physicist (1898 – 1979)

George Russell Harrison
- George Russell Harrison
- Born: July 14, 1898; San Diego, California
- Died: July 27, 1979 (aged 81); Concord, Massachusetts
- Education: Stanford University (BSc, MSc)
- Awards: Medal of Freedom (1946); Elliott Cresson Medal (1953); William F. Meggers Award (1970)
- Scientific career
- Fields: Physics

George Russell Harrison (July 14, 1898 – July 27, 1979) was an American physicist.

== Biography ==
Harrison was born on July 14, 1898 in San Diego, California. His father is close friend with the Varian brothers, who invented the Klystron. It is rumored that their friendship fostered Harrison's interest in physics. His son David Kent Harrison was a professor of mathematics at the University of Oregon and a Guggenheim Fellow for the academic year 1963–1964. His son is the composer and pianist Michael Harrison and his daughter is Jo Ellen Harrison.

Harrison began studying physics at Stanford University in 1915. Interrupted by World War I, he received his bachelors' degree in 1919. Same year, he continued his study in Stanford for his master's degree in physics. For the period, he lived with the Hoover's family on the Stanford Campus.

== Career ==
Harrison became professor of experimental physics at the Massachusetts Institute of Technology (MIT) in 1930, and was appointed the school's dean of science in 1942; he also headed MIT's spectroscopy laboratory. During World War II, he was chief of the optics division of the National Defense Research Committee, and later head of the Office of Field Service of the Office of Scientific Research and Development. Harrison was elected to the American Academy of Arts and Sciences in 1931. He served as president of the Optical Society of America from 1945–46 and was awarded the Frederic Ives Medal in 1949. He was an Honorary Member and Fellow of OSA, and in addition to the Ives Medal, received the Mees and Meggers Awards. He was presented with the Medal of Freedom in 1946 by President Harry Truman. He was elected to the American Philosophical Society in 1950. He remained dean of science at MIT until his retirement in 1964.

== See also ==
- Optical Society of America
