= Chauncey Guy Suits =

Chauncey Guy Suits (March 12, 1905 – August 14, 1991) was a distinguished director of the General Electric (GE) Research Laboratory, and a founding member of the National Academy of Engineering.

== Biography ==
Suits was born in Oshkosh, Wisconsin, studied physics and mathematics at the University of Wisconsin–Madison where he was a member of Sigma Pi fraternity. He received his A.B. in 1927. He then began doctoral studies at the Swiss Federal Institute of Technology in Zurich, where he had hoped to study under Wolfgang Pauli (who moved to Leipzig before he arrived), and completed his Doctor of Science in physics in 1929. He then spent one additional year at Wisconsin before joining General Electric as a research physicist in 1930.

His research work in the 1930s concerned non-linear electric circuits, and subsequently electric arcs and high temperature plasma phenomena. In 1940 he became Assistant to the Director of Research at GE, and simultaneously from 1942 to 1946 was in the National Defense Research Committee of the Office of Scientific Research and Development, heading Division 15 in Electronics which was responsible for radio and radar countermeasures. In 1945, he became Vice President and Director of Research at GE, holding that post until 1965. He was elected to the United States National Academy of Sciences in 1946. He was elected to the American Philosophical Society in 1951. In 1962, his leadership role at GE was recognized by the Industrial Research Institute by being presented with the IRI Medal. He was elected to the American Academy of Arts and Sciences in 1966.

The Suits-Bueche Planetarium in Schenectady, New York, is named in his honor.
