= Robert Spencer Stone =

Canadian-American radiologist

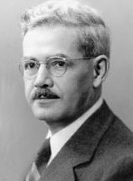
- Born: June 5, 1895; Chatham, ON
- Died: December 18, 1966 (aged 71); San Francisco, CA
- Education: University of Toronto
- Scientific career
- Fields: Radiology, Physics

Robert Spencer Stone (June 5, 1895- December 18, 1966) was a Canadian-American physician who served as head of the Health Division of the Chicago Metallurgical Laboratory as part of the Manhattan Project. He oversaw experiments in which test subjects were injected with radioactive materials such as plutonium in order to measure their metabolism and excretion.

Prior to his work in the Manhattan Project, Robert Stone performed clinical trials in which cancer patients were exposed to radiation. In 1942, Stone was invited to work at the Chicago Metallurgical Laboratory to oversee research into the safety of radiation exposure.

His research during the Manhattan Project has been subject to controversy, as test subjects were exposed to radioactive materials without informed consent. His research methods were the subject of investigation by the Advisory Committee on Human Radiation Experiments created by U.S. President Bill Clinton in 1994.
