= John Ely Burchard =

American academic (1898–1975)

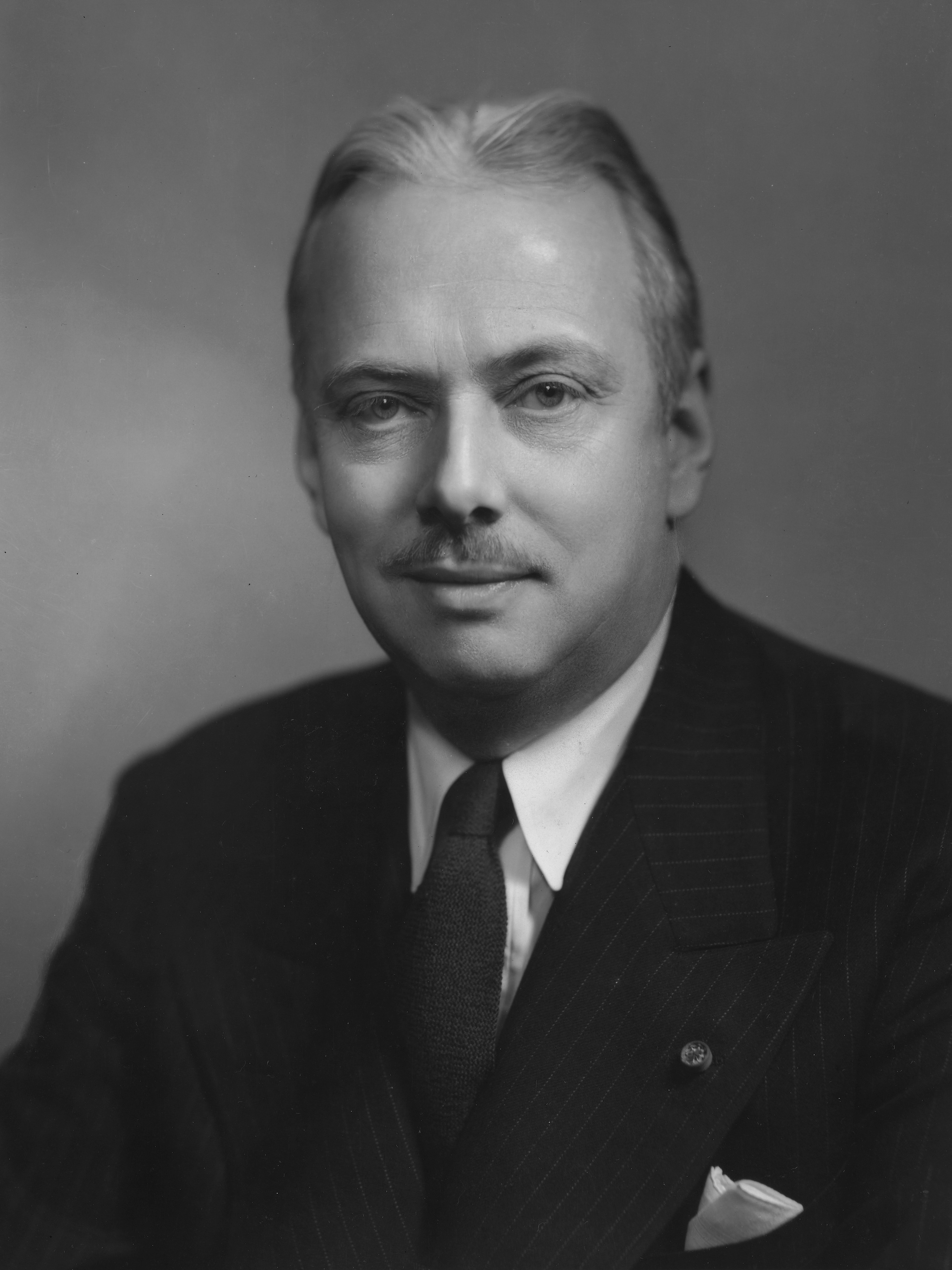
Burchard in 1949

John Ely Burchard (December 8, 1898 Marshall, Minnesota - December 25, 1975 Boston) was an American professor and dean at the Massachusetts Institute of Technology (MIT). He was a historian and architectural critic. He was President of the American Academy of Arts and Sciences from 1954 to 1957.

He attended the University of Minnesota for two and a half years, served in World War I, and returned to study at MIT, obtaining a bachelor's degree in 1923 and a master's in 1925.

Burchard started his career at Bemis Industries as research director, vice president, and director. He was appointed professor at MIT in 1938. From 1940 to 1945, he was affiliated with the National Research Council and the National Defense Research Committee. For his war work, he received a Medal for Merit in 1948.

Burchard was the first dean of MIT's School of Humanities and Social Science, serving from 1950 to 1969.

The John E. Burchard Professor of Humanities is an endowed chair named in his honor. MIT holds his papers.

== Works ==
- Bernini is dead? Architecture and the Social Purpose, 1976, ISBN 0070089221
- with Albert Bush-Brown, The architecture of America; a social and cultural history, 3rd ed., 1967
- The voice of the phoenix; postwar architecture in Germany, 1966
- with Oscar Handlin, The Historian and the City, 1963
- Burchard, John Ely (1957). "The Urban Aesthetic". The Annals of the American Academy of Political and Social Science. 314 (1). SAGE Publications: 112–122. doi:10.1177/000271625731400114. ISSN 0002-7162. S2CID 145659362.
