= Irvin Stewart =

American administrator (1899–1990)

Commissioner of the Federal Communications Commission
- In office July 11, 1934 – June 30, 1937
- President: Franklin D. Roosevelt
- Preceded by: Position established
- Succeeded by: T.A.M. Craven

Personal details
- Born: October 27, 1899 Fort Worth, Texas
- Died: December 24, 1990 (aged 91) Washington, D.C.
- Party: Democratic

Irvin Stewart (October 27, 1899 – December 24, 1990) was an American administrator who served as a Commissioner of the Federal Communications Commission from 1934 to 1937 and as the President of West Virginia University from 1946 to 1958.

He died of a stroke on December 24, 1990, in Washington, D.C. at age 91.

== See also ==
- List of presidents of West Virginia University
