= Paul E. Klopsteg =

American physicist (1889–1991)

Paul Ernest Klopsteg (May 30, 1889 – April 28, 1991) was an American physicist. The asteroid 3520 Klopsteg was named after him and the yearly Klopsteg Memorial Award was founded in his memory.

He performed ballistics research during World War I at the US Army's Aberdeen Proving Grounds in Maryland. He applied his knowledge of ballistics to the study of archery.

He was director of research at Northwestern University Technical Institution. From 1951 through 1958 he was an associate director of the National Science Foundation and was president of the American Association for the Advancement of Science from 1958 through 1959.

In 1979, aged 90, he was the first and so far (as of February 2016) only person to receive an Extraordinary Oersted Medal Award.

== Archery publications ==
Paul E Klopsteg. Turkish Archery and the Composite Bow. Second edition, revised, 1947, published by the author, 2424 Lincolnwood Drive, Evanston, Illinois

Hickman, C. N.; Nagler, Forrest; Klopsteg, Paul E. (1947), Archery: The Technical Side. A compilation of scientific and technical articles on theory, construction, use and performance of bows and arrows, reprinted from journals of science and of archery, National Field Archery Association.
