= Frank B. Jewett =

American physicist, engineer and businessman (1879-1949)

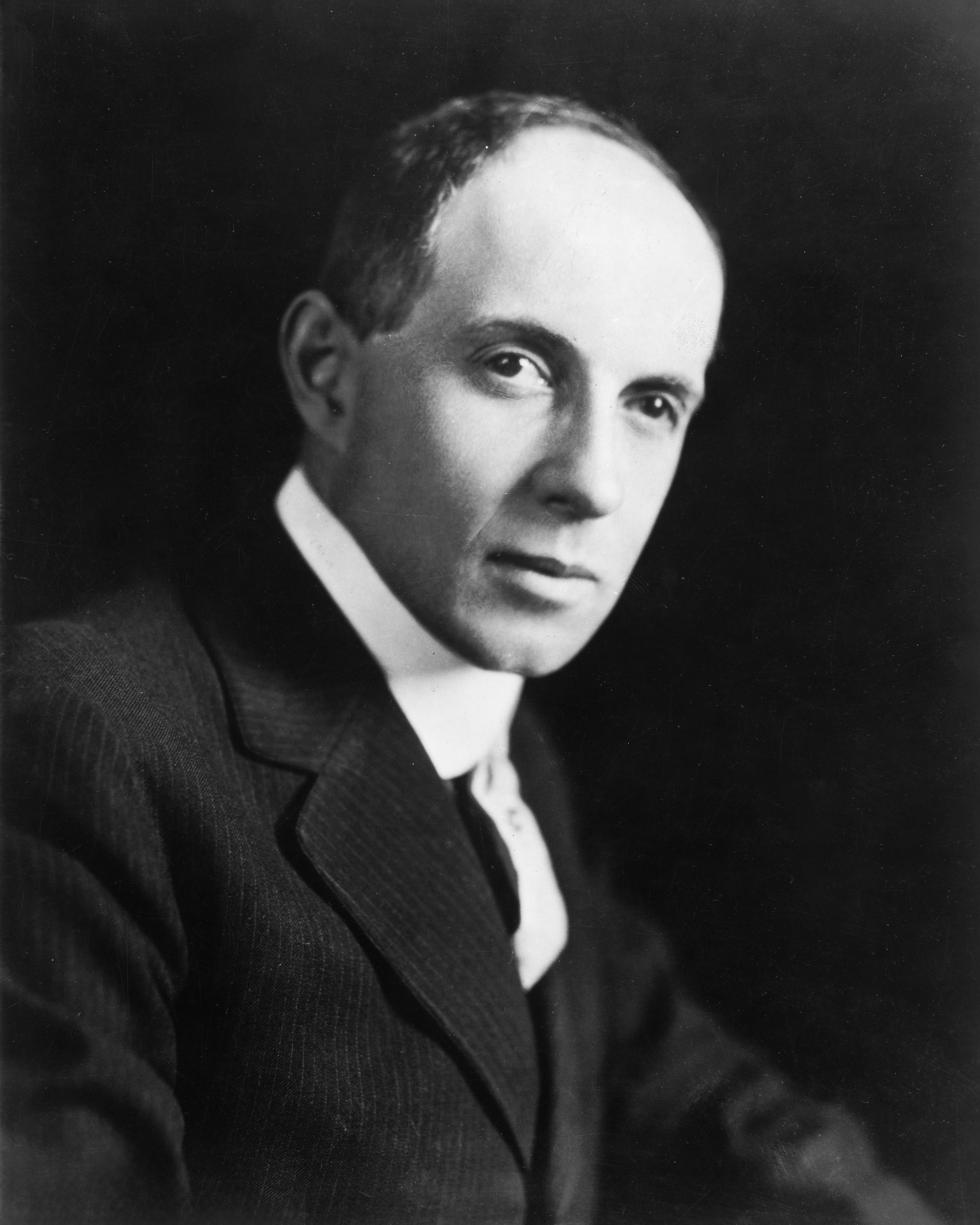
- Jewett circa 1926

Personal details
- Born: September 5, 1879 Pasadena, California, U.S.
- Died: November 18, 1949 (aged 70) Summit, New Jersey, U.S.
- Education: University of Chicago
- Awards: Edison Medal (1928); Faraday Medal (1935); Franklin Medal (1936); John Fritz Medal (1939); Hoover Medal (1949); IRI Medal (1950)
- Scientific career
- Fields: Physics

Frank Baldwin Jewett (/ˈdʒuːɪt/; September 5, 1879 – November 18, 1949) worked as an engineer for American Telegraph and Telephone where his work demonstrated transatlantic radio telephony using a vacuum-tube transmitter. He was also a physicist and the first president of Bell Labs.

== Biography ==
He graduated from the Throop Institute of Technology (later the California Institute of Technology) in 1898, and received the doctoral degree in physics in 1902 from the University of Chicago (IL). Jewett was president of the American Institute of Electrical Engineers from 1922 to 1923.

The Bell Telephone Laboratories were established in 1925 with Jewett as president; he stayed until 1940. He also was chairman of the Board of Directors of Bell Laboratories from 1940 to 1944.

In 1928, the AIEE awarded him the Edison Medal "For his contributions to the art of electric communication." He was elected to the American Academy of Arts and Sciences in 1930 and the American Philosophical Society in 1938. Jewett was elected to the National Academy of Sciences in 1918 and served as its President from 1939 to 1947. In 1950, he was awarded the IRI Medal from the Industrial Research Institute for recognition of his role in technology leadership. He also served on the National Defense Research Committee.

Historian Leonard S. Reich (1985) argues that in the early 1900s, AT&T and other companies established research labs as a defensive measure against competitors threatening their core businesses. Despite AT&T's very large investment in its telephone system, it faced fierce competition from smaller regional firms. To maintain dominance, AT&T concentrated on creating a nationwide telephone system that provided good technology and the widest possible long-distance calling. A key invention that would leave the competition far behind, would be a repeater device to allow coast-to-coast telephone transmission. This research became even more pressing when the engineers realized that the device would also be pivotal for radio development, which had the potential to render wired communication obsolete. The vacuum tube was the critical device. AT&T did not invent it but did purchase the patent and then significantly improved it. AT&T continued research to reinforce its existing telephone system. The research philosophy, according to Jewett, the research director, centered around science's usefulness in the systematic advancement of electrical communication. The vacuum tube thus played a critical role in the company's success in both telephone and radio industries.

Jewett served as president of the Board of Trustees for the New York Museum of Science and Industry, and was a trustee at Princeton University, the Carnegie Institution of Washington, the Woods Hole Oceanographic Institute, and Tabor Academy.

== Patents ==
- U.S. patent 1,559,325, Means for analyzing and synthesizing electric waves, 1925.

== Sources ==
- IEEE History Biography of Frank B Jewett
- J. Olin, Howe (April 6, 1919). "Wonders of Wireless Telephony - Past and to Come". New-York tribune. (New York [N.Y.]) 1866-1924. pp. VII 3.
