= Massachusetts Institute of Technology =

Private research university in Cambridge, Massachusetts, United States

Coordinates: 42°21′35″N 71°05′31″W

- Motto: Mens et Manus (Latin)
- Motto in English: "Mind and Hand"
- Type: Private research university
- Established: April 10, 1861; 165 years ago
- Founder: William Barton Rogers
- Accreditation: NECHE
- Academic affiliations: AAU; AITU; NAICU; UARC; URA; Sea grant; Space grant
- Endowment: $29.2 billion (2026)
- President: Sally Kornbluth
- Provost: Anantha P. Chandrakasan
- Academic staff: 1,090
- Students: 11,816 (Fall 2025)
- Undergraduates: 4,561 (Fall 2025)
- Postgraduates: 7,255 (Fall 2025)
- Location: Cambridge, Massachusetts, United States
- Campus: 166 acres (67.2 ha); Midsize city
- Newspaper: The Tech
- Colors: Cardinal red and steel gray
- Nickname: Engineers
- Sporting affiliations: NCAA Division III – NEWMAC; NEISA; CWPA; UVC; EARC; EAWRC
- Mascot: Tim the Beaver
- Website: web.mit.edu
- ASN: 3

The Massachusetts Institute of Technology (MIT) is a private research university in Cambridge, Massachusetts, United States.

William Barton Rogers founded MIT to accelerate American industrialization through scientific knowledge. Initially funded by a federal land grant, the institute adopted a German polytechnic model emphasizing laboratory instruction in applied science and engineering, and moved from Boston's Back Bay to its current campus in Cambridge in 1916. Early growth came through research contracts with private industry, though the institute remained financially constrained and focused primarily on practical engineering education into the 1930s.

MIT's transformation as a research enterprise began during World War II, when projects like the Radiation Laboratory made it the nation's largest non-industrial R&D contractor. Graduate enrollment and research funding grew rapidly in the postwar decades as faculty members such as Vannevar Bush helped shape federal support for basic science. In the late twentieth century, MIT became closely associated with computer science, artificial intelligence, biotechnology, open-source software development, and "big science" initiatives like the Apollo Guidance Computer and the LIGO project. Engineering remains its largest school, though MIT has also developed prominent programs in basic science, economics, management, architecture, and humanities.

MIT has an urban campus that extends more than a mile (1.6 km) along the Charles River. Academic buildings are connected by an extensive corridor system. MIT's off-campus operations include Lincoln Laboratory and Haystack Observatory, as well as affiliated laboratories such as the Broad and Whitehead Institutes. Undergraduate life is known for hands-on research and elaborate pranks. Tuition is generally not charged to undergraduates from families with incomes below $200,000, and most graduate students are funded by research.

As of October 2026, 107 Nobel laureates, 26 Turing Award winners, and 8 Fields Medalists have been affiliated with MIT as alumni, faculty members, or researchers. Alumni and faculty have founded many notable companies and served in senior government positions in the United States and abroad.

== History ==
=== Foundation and vision ===
[...] a school of industrial science aiding the advancement, development and practical application of science in connection with arts, agriculture, manufactures, and commerce [...]

— Massachusetts General Court, Acts of 1861, Chapter 183

In 1859, a proposal was submitted to the Massachusetts General Court to use newly filled lands in Back Bay, Boston for a "Conservatory of Art and Science", but the proposal failed. A charter for the incorporation of the Massachusetts Institute of Technology, proposed by William Barton Rogers, was signed by John Albion Andrew, the governor of Massachusetts, on April 10, 1861.

Rogers, a geologist who had recently arrived in Boston from the University of Virginia, wanted to establish an institution to address rapid scientific and technological advances. He did not wish to found a professional school, but a combination with elements of both professional and liberal education, proposing that:

The true and only practicable object of a polytechnic school is, as I conceive, the teaching, not of the minute details and manipulations of the arts, which can be done only in the workshop, but the inculcation of those scientific principles which form the basis and explanation of them, and along with this, a full and methodical review of all their leading processes and operations in connection with physical laws.

The Rogers Plan reflected the German research university model, emphasizing an independent faculty engaged in research, as well as instruction oriented around seminars and laboratories.

=== Early developments ===
Original Rogers Building in Back Bay, Boston, 1872

Two days after MIT was chartered, the first battle of the Civil War broke out. After a long delay through the war years, MIT's first classes were held in the Mercantile Building in Boston in 1865. The new institute was founded as part of the Morrill Land-Grant Colleges Act to fund institutions "to promote the liberal and practical education of the industrial classes" and was a land-grant school. In 1863, under the same act, the Commonwealth of Massachusetts founded the Massachusetts Agricultural College, which later developed into the University of Massachusetts Amherst. In 1866, the proceeds from land sales went toward new buildings in the Back Bay.

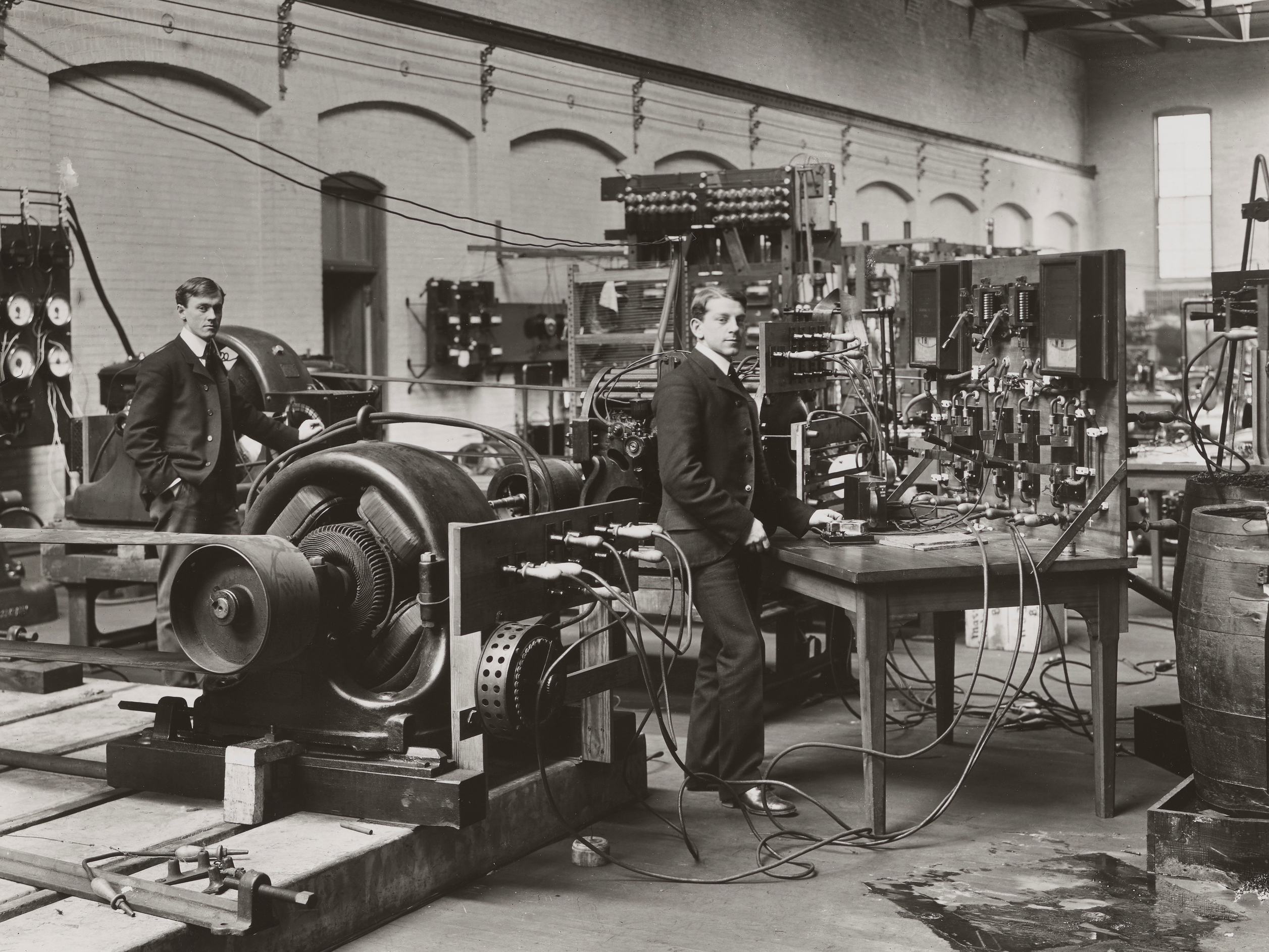
"Boston Tech" students testing dynamos

MIT was informally called "Boston Tech". The institute adopted the European polytechnic university model and emphasized laboratory instruction from an early date. Despite chronic financial problems, the institute saw growth in the last two decades of the 19th century under President Francis Amasa Walker. Programs in electrical, chemical, marine, and sanitary engineering were introduced, new buildings were built, and the size of the student body increased to more than one thousand.

The curriculum drifted to a vocational emphasis, with less focus on theoretical science. The fledgling school still suffered from chronic financial shortages which diverted the attention of the MIT leadership. During these "Boston Tech" years, MIT faculty and alumni rebuffed Harvard University president (and former MIT faculty) Charles W. Eliot's repeated attempts to merge MIT with Harvard College's Lawrence Scientific School. There would be at least six attempts to absorb MIT into Harvard. In its cramped Back Bay location, MIT could not afford to expand its overcrowded facilities, driving a desperate search for a new campus and funding. Eventually, the MIT Corporation approved a formal agreement to merge with Harvard and move to then-remote Allston, over the vehement objections of MIT faculty, students, and alumni. The merger plan collapsed in 1905 when the Massachusetts Supreme Judicial Court ruled that MIT could not sell its Back Bay land.

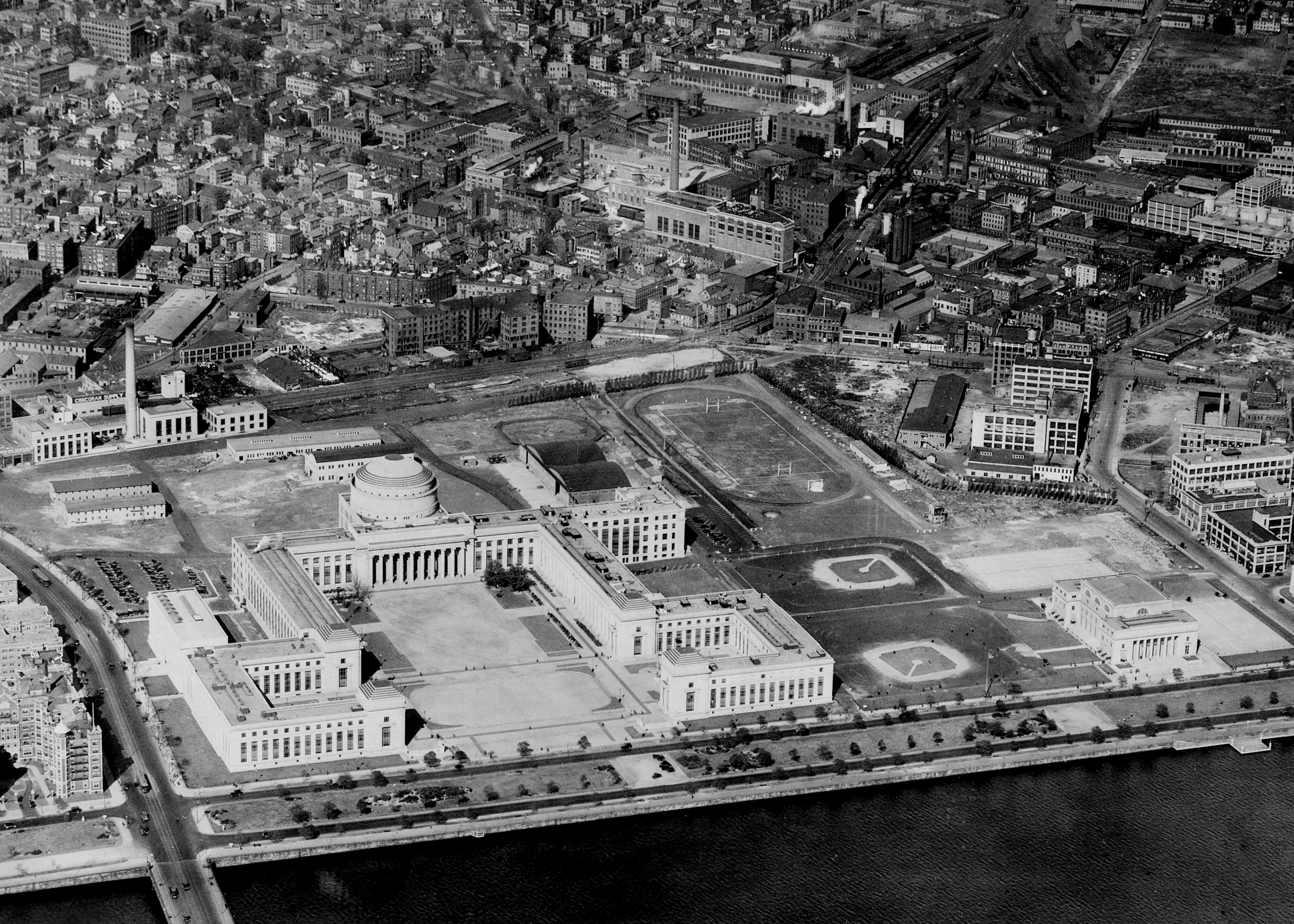
"New Technology" campus in Cambridge, opened in 1916.

In 1912, MIT acquired its current campus by purchasing a one-mile (1.6 km) tract of filled lands along the Cambridge side of the Charles River. The neoclassical "New Technology" campus was designed by William W. Bosworth and had been funded largely by anonymous donations from a mysterious "Mr. Smith", starting in 1912. In January 1920, the donor was revealed to be the industrialist George Eastman, an inventor of film production methods and founder of Eastman Kodak. (Note: Between 1912 and 1920, Eastman donated $20 million ($304.2 million in 2024 dollars) in cash and Kodak stock to MIT.) In 1916, with the first academic buildings complete, the MIT administration and the MIT charter crossed the Charles River on the ceremonial barge Bucentaur built for the occasion.

=== Industry dependence and reform ===
Unlike the Ivy League universities, MIT drew an unusually large share of its students from families of moderate means and depended heavily on tuition rather than endowment income for its operating budget. The "Technology Plan," launched by President Richard Maclaurin in 1919, sought to deepen industry patronage. Under the plan, corporations paid MIT an annual retaining fee in exchange for access to faculty, library resources, and technical services. By the late 1920s, more than a third of the teaching staff were engaged in research, testing, or consulting for industry, with MIT handling an expanding volume of corporate contracts. An industry orientation meant that salaries and faculty research funds lagged behind those at other American research universities. Heavy work on industry problems limited basic research and diminished interest from foundations. By the late 1920s MIT was regarded by elite universities as a "mere engineering school servicing industry".

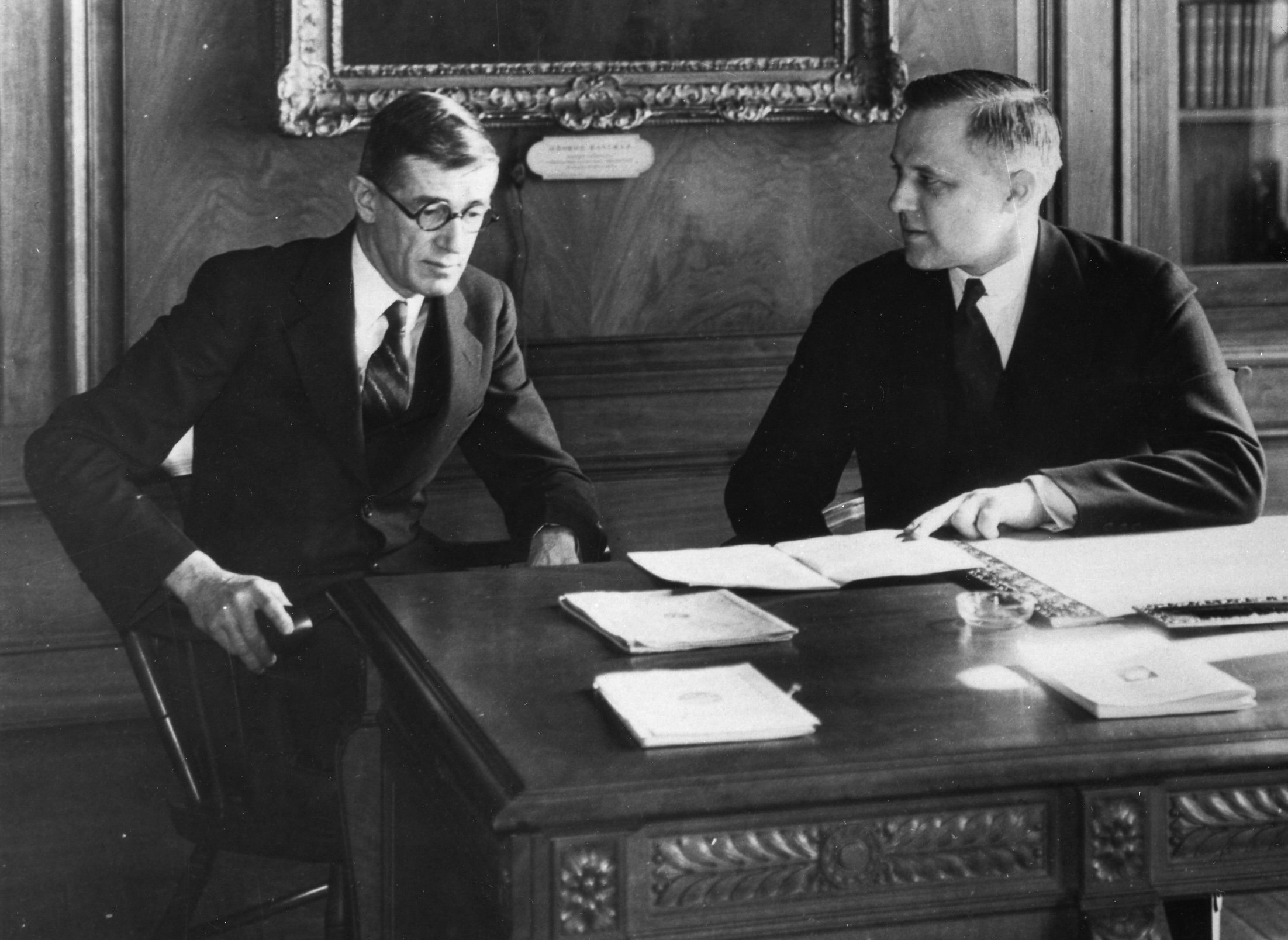
Vannevar Bush (l) and Karl Compton (r) led reforms to funding and curriculum

A mandate for reform came from board members tied to industry research: Gerard Swope, president of General Electric, and Frank B. Jewett, head of Bell Telephone Laboratories. Both argued that practice-oriented training was obsolete and industry needed engineers grounded in fundamental science. In 1930 they recruited the physicist Karl Compton to carry out a broad program of reform.

As president, Compton overhauled the science departments first, recruiting a cohort of research-oriented faculty. In 1932, he reorganized MIT into schools of engineering, science, and architecture, created a formal graduate school, and appointed Vannevar Bush as vice president and dean of engineering. To relieve dependence on industry, the pair centralized all industrial contracts, established a patent licensing program, and curtailed faculty consulting. Compton also tripled philanthropic support for research and campaigned for federal government support of university science.

The reforms were uneven. Physics, chemistry, and electrical engineering advanced rapidly, but much of the engineering school did virtually no research well into the 1930s. Faculty resisted changes to shop practice and consulting arrangements. Even so, by the mid-1930s, MIT had been admitted to the Association of American Universities, the organization of the nation's top research universities. The institutional changes of this decade positioned MIT to take a leading role in wartime research after 1940.

=== Defense research ===
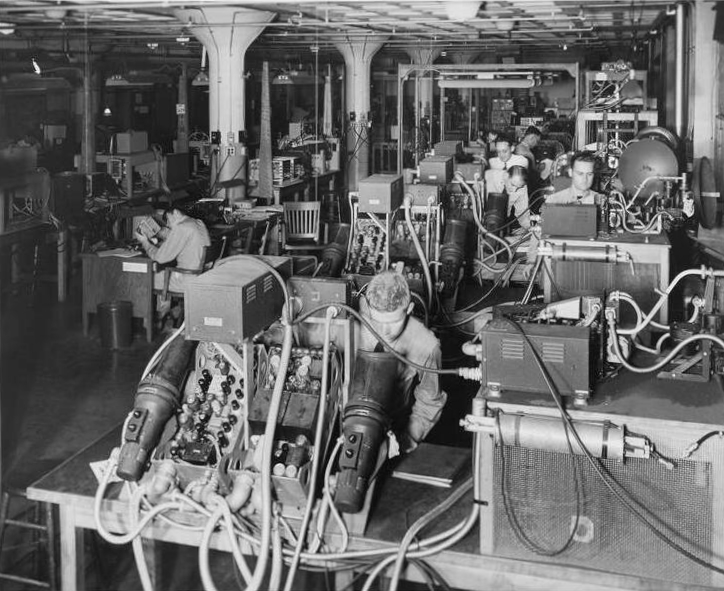
Navy recruits training on Rad Lab radar systems

In June 1940, Vannevar Bush, who had left MIT's administration to lead the Carnegie Institution in Washington, persuaded President Roosevelt to create the National Defense Research Committee (NDRC) to mobilize civilian science for defense. The NDRC's first major project was a laboratory for microwave radar research. After other proposed sites fell through, Bush and other science administrators turned to Compton, who agreed to host the project at MIT.

The Radiation Laboratory, as it was called to conceal its purpose, opened in 1940 and grew from a staff of thirty to roughly 4,000 and rivaled the Manhattan Project in scale: the NDRC division under which it operated expended $1.5 billion on radar systems. The Rad Lab contract was the first and largest wartime research agreement between the federal government and a university; its terms became a model for postwar government–university contracts. (Note: Other wartime projects at MIT included Charles Stark Draper's gyroscopic gunsights for the Navy, Gordon Brown's work on feedback-control systems in the Servomechanisms Laboratory, and dozens of smaller efforts across the Institute.) By war's end MIT had received $117 million ($2.1 billion in 2025) in government R&D contracts, more than any industrial contractor and roughly a third of all NDRC spending on university research.

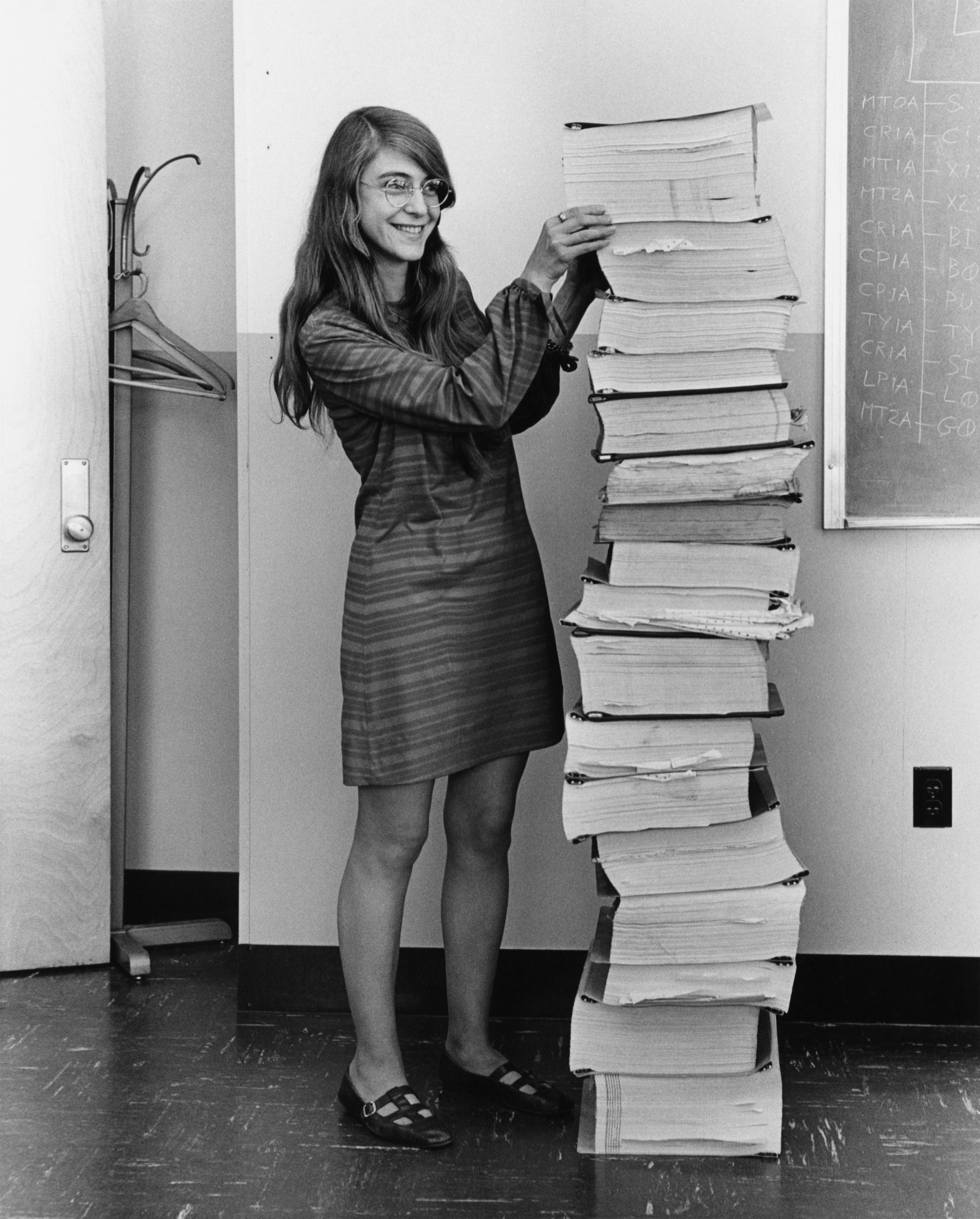
Margaret Hamilton wrote guidance code for the Apollo moon landings

The Rad Lab closed in 1945, but opened a new era of large military research contracts at MIT. New interdepartmental laboratories took shape: the Research Laboratory of Electronics (1946) inherited the Rad Lab's facilities and an Army–Navy contract for basic research in microwaves and electronics; the Laboratory for Nuclear Science (1946) opened with Navy support; Lincoln Laboratory (1951) was created to develop a continental air-defense radar network for the Air Force. Charles Stark Draper's wartime gunsight laboratory, renamed the Instrumentation Laboratory, expanded into inertial guidance for ballistic missiles and computerized guidance for the Apollo lunar mission. The new laboratories became the primary training ground for graduate students in science and engineering and spawned dozens of firms along the Route 128 corridor. (Note: Research outgrowths of the interdepartmental laboratories included:: Magnetic-core memory and system dynamics developments by Jay Forrester; Information theory by Claude Shannon and Robert Fano; Cybernetics writings by Norbert Wiener; Generative grammar by Noam Chomsky; Artificial intelligence by Marvin Minsky.)

The cumulative effect transformed MIT. Between the early 1930s and the mid-1950s, the faculty doubled and the graduate student body quintupled. Federal funding, negligible before the war, reached $38 million by 1944, and by 1957 research expenditures represented 72 percent of MIT's operating budget. The Department of Defense was the dominant sponsor for much of this period. By 1962 the physicist Alvin Weinberg said it was difficult "to tell whether MIT is a university with many government research laboratories appended to it or a cluster of government research laboratories with a very good educational institution attached to it."

Most defense-funded work on campus was basic and unclassified. The major exception was the Instrumentation Laboratory, which carried projects from conception through deployment, an anomaly in university research. Its work on guidance systems for American Poseidon MIRV warheads drew particular criticism as destabilizing the Cold War arms race.

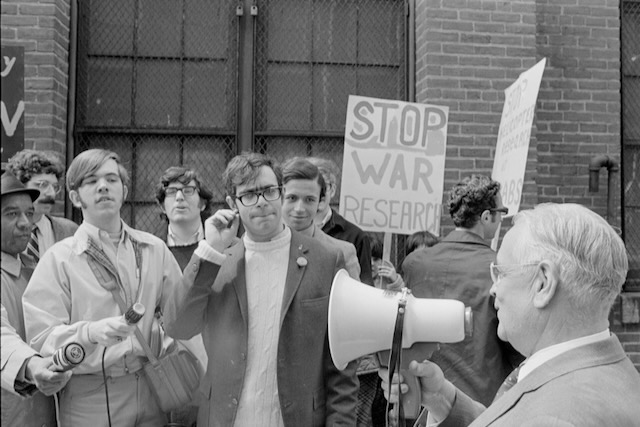
"Doc" Draper and picketers at the Instrumentation Lab

Opposition to the Vietnam War brought these tensions to a head. On March 4, 1969, students and faculty organized a research stoppage to protest the military applications of science. (Note: Out of the faculty protesting against the Instrumentation Lab emerged the Union of Concerned Scientists.) President Howard Johnson convened a review panel on the Instrumentation Lab and Lincoln Lab, chaired by Sloan School dean William Pounds, even as demonstrations continued into the fall. The Pounds Panel reaffirmed the place of the labs at MIT and recommended diversification and oversight, not military divestiture. In May 1970, Johnson announced that the Instrumentation Laboratory would be separated from MIT, and it became the independent Draper Laboratory in 1973. (Note: Johnson's action ran contrary to the activists' demands and the Pounds Panel recommendations. Most activists had sought conversion of the laboratories to civilian research, not divestiture, predicting that an independent laboratory would pursue weapons work without academic restraint. Only two members of the 22-member panel had recommended separation. After separation, the Draper Laboratory immediately became the largest nonprofit defense R&D contractor in the country, with DOD obligations exceeding 90 percent of its funding.) MIT established a policy that on-campus research must be open and publishable, and classified work was consolidated at Lincoln Laboratory's off-campus site. (Note: After the recommendation to diversify funding, Lincoln remained tilted toward military projects in the subsequent decade. By the mid-1980s roughly a quarter of its budget came from the Strategic Defense Initiative.)

=== Postwar educational reform ===
The Institute's new scale and resources raised questions about its educational direction. By 1946, research dwarfed the academic budget. The number of graduate students rose from roughly 700 in 1940 to 2,700 by 1959; the ratio of graduate to undergraduate students shifted from about 1:3 before the war to nearly 1:1. Federal research contracts, which supported research assistants, drove much of this growth. By the late 1950s, MIT had "virtually become a graduate school with a strong undergraduate school."

At Vice President James Killian's urging in 1947, MIT faculty formed a Committee on Educational Survey chaired by chemical engineer Warren K. Lewis. (Note: Killian, appointed president a year later in 1948, promoted the adoption of the committee's ideas.) After two years of study, the Lewis Committee's landmark report reaffirmed the founding principle that the Institute should integrate useful training and liberal education, and warned that a preoccupation with research was coming at the expense of undergraduate teaching. It called for MIT students to build creative and intellectual autonomy rather than command of routine procedures.

In 1950, the Corporation approved the committee's recommendation to form a School of Humanities and Social Studies. (Note: The humanities and social sciences had previously been organized as a division with lower institutional status than the schools of Engineering, Architecture, and Science and no authority to grant degrees. The school later became known as the School of Humanities, Arts, and Social Sciences.) The new school offered general education for undergraduates alongside graduate programs in political science, economics, linguistics, and science and technology studies.

Reform in engineering met greater resistance. Professors hired to advance applied science in the 1930s were opposed by older faculty attached to practical instruction and shop-centered training. In mechanical engineering, Richard Söderberg and reformers dismantled machinery laboratories. Gordon Brown gave higher priority to modern physics within electrical engineering and instituted new programs in engineering science across departments. (Note: Brown originally advanced these ideas as head of electrical engineering. When he became dean of engineering in 1959, a Ford Foundation grant extended the engineering-science approach to metallurgy, mechanical engineering, and aeronautical engineering.) These changes, part of a national movement to put engineering education on scientific footing, reshaped the MIT undergraduate experience in a single generation.

New educational experiments sought to improve undergraduate training. In 1957, Edwin H. Land, the inventor of instant photography, gave a lecture arguing that students should engage in original research from their arrival on campus, working with faculty rather than waiting years to reach the research frontier. In 1969, the new Undergraduate Research Opportunities Program (UROP), directed by physicist Margaret MacVicar, allowed undergraduates to participate in research projects across the Institute. This was widely adopted at other schools and was later identified by Clark Kerr as one of the few genuine university reforms from the 1960s.

=== Recent history ===
==== Life sciences ====
From the 1970s onward, MIT's reduced portfolio of on-campus defense research was matched by a rise in government-sponsored health research. (Note: The share of on-campus research supported by the Department of Health and Human Services rose from 16 percent in 1970 to 33 percent by 2006, while the Department of Defense's share fell from 28 to 15 percent.) The Center for Cancer Research, opened in 1974 in a converted candy factory (E17) on Ames Street, marked a turning point. Founded by Salvador Luria with a National Cancer Institute grant and staffed by a cohort recruited with David Baltimore, including Phillip Sharp, Nancy Hopkins, and Robert Weinberg, the center quickly became one of the strongest groups in cancer biology in the country. (Note: Baltimore received the Nobel Prize in Physiology or Medicine the following year; Sharp shared the prize in 1993 for his discovery of RNA splicing.)

After a contentious public debate over recombinant DNA research was resolved by a Cambridge city ordinance in 1977, MIT expanded biological research through a series of independent but affiliated research institutes. The Whitehead Institute (1982) added sixteen investigators to the biology faculty. Mathematician Eric Lander, working from the Whitehead, established a genome center in 1990 that became a major contributor to the Human Genome Project. The Broad Institute (2003), a joint enterprise with Harvard, grew out of that effort into one of the largest genomic research operations in the world. The McGovern Institute for Brain Research (2001) and the Picower Institute for Learning and Memory (2002) extended the model into the neurosciences. New buildings for biology, neuroscience, genomics, and cancer research rose on the northeast campus. In 1998, a new Department of Biological Engineering was created at the interface of molecular biology and engineering.

Investments in the life sciences spawned a biotechnology industry cluster around Kendall Square. Homegrown firms such as Biogen and Genzyme first expanded in the area. In 2002, Novartis relocated its research headquarters to Cambridge, a decision that drew virtually every major pharmaceutical company to follow over the next decade. In 2004, neuroscientist Susan Hockfield was appointed as the first life scientist to lead MIT. In 2006, President Hockfield launched the MIT Energy Initiative to investigate challenges posed by increasing global energy consumption.

==== Computation ====
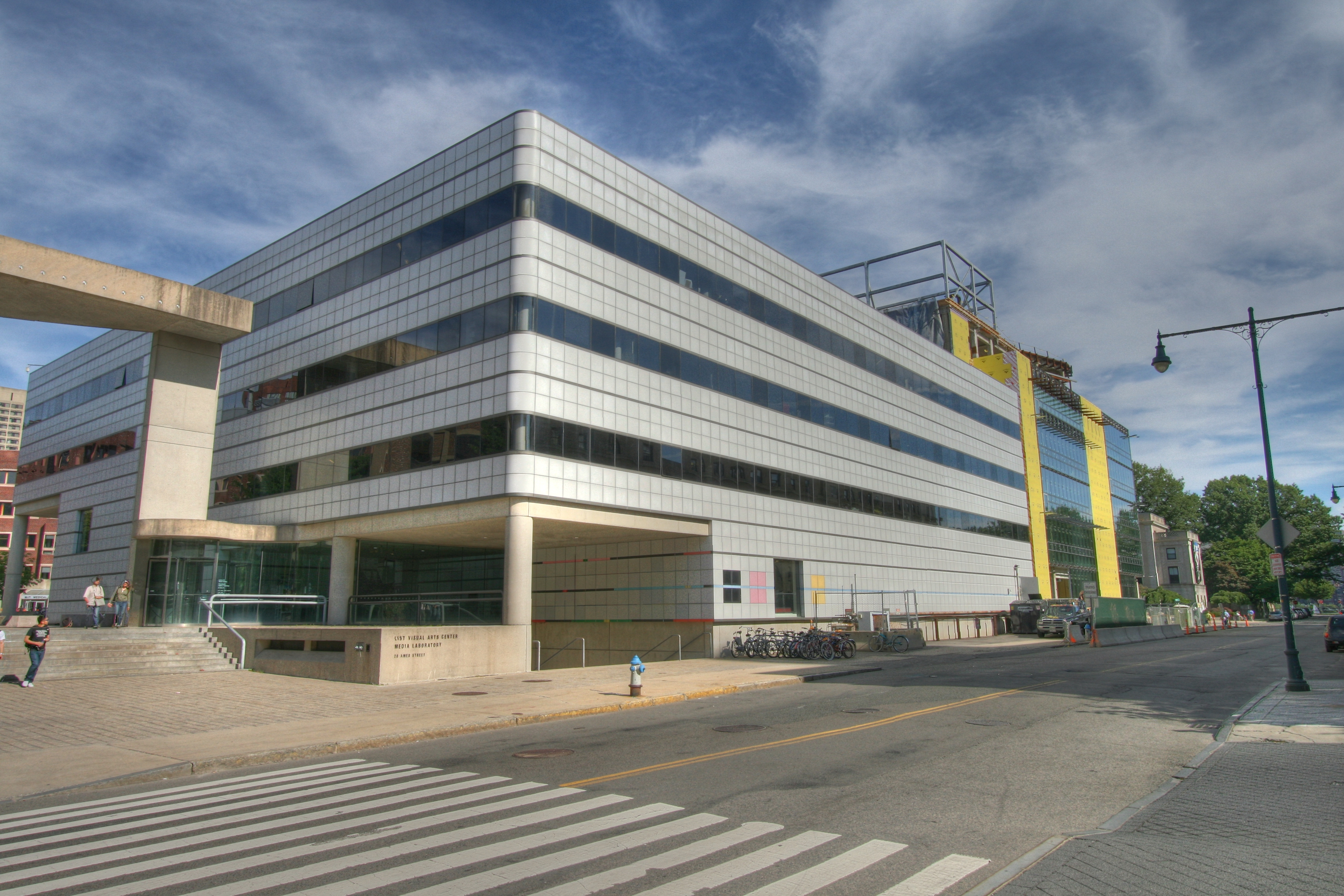
The 1985 MIT Media Lab building, designed by I.M. Pei, houses researchers developing novel uses of computer technology.

Programs that emerged from defense projects—Whirlwind, the Research Laboratory of Electronics, and the SAGE air-defense system—gave rise to digital computing laboratories in the 1960s. Project MAC, launched in 1963 with ARPA funding, was an interdepartmental effort focused on time-sharing and artificial intelligence. The project was reorganized in 1976 as the Laboratory for Computer Science (LCS). The Tech Model Railroad Club, whose members worked on the electrical switching networks guiding trains, became an incubator for student programmers. These groups came together in the AI Laboratory, regarded as the birthplace of hacker culture.

When commercial spinoffs began absorbing campus computer researchers in the early 1980s, Richard Stallman launched the GNU Project (1983) and the Free Software Foundation (1985), which established a framework for free software that shaped the later open-source movement.

MIT launched Project Athena in 1983, a partnership with IBM and the Digital Equipment Corporation to install networked workstations across campus. Broad computing access generated widely used network infrastructure, including the Kerberos authentication protocol and the X Window System. In 1985, Nicholas Negroponte and former MIT president Jerome Wiesner founded the Media Lab, a center to integrate computing with communication, design, and the arts that drew researchers from the AI Lab. The lab's industry sponsorship model helped encourage technology firms to establish satellite offices in nearby Kendall Square.

In 1994, Tim Berners-Lee established the World Wide Web Consortium (W3C) in LCS to develop open standards for the web. In 2003, the AI Lab and LCS merged to form the Computer Science and Artificial Intelligence Laboratory (CSAIL), now MIT's largest laboratory group. The labs inspired OpenCourseWare in 2002, an effort to freely publish MIT courses, on the principle that knowledge systems should be freely accessed. In 2018, MIT announced the creation of the Schwarzman College of Computing, a $1-billion initiative to integrate artificial intelligence into MIT research and education.

==== Institutional life ====
In 1991, the Department of Justice sued MIT and the eight Ivy League universities, alleging that their practice of coordinating need-based financial aid offers violated antitrust law. The other schools signed consent decrees, while MIT contested the suit alone. (Note: In court, MIT argued that aid allocations were charitable functions and that coordination allowed them to direct limited charitable resources to students who needed it most.) A federal appeals court ruled in MIT's favor and Congress subsequently passed legislation permitting need-based aid coordination among universities.

In 1999, a group of women faculty in the School of Science, led by biologist Nancy Hopkins, published a report contending that women faculty received lower salaries and fewer institutional resources than their male colleagues of comparable rank. In response, President Charles Vest wrote that he now understood the reality of gender discrimination at MIT to be "the greater part of the balance" than the perception of it. The report prompted policy changes at MIT and spurred similar investigations at nine other universities.

Three days after the Boston Marathon bombing of April 2013, MIT Police officer Sean Collier was fatally shot by the bombers on campus, setting off a manhunt that shut down much of the Boston metropolitan area. His memorial service drew more than 10,000 people.

== Campus ==
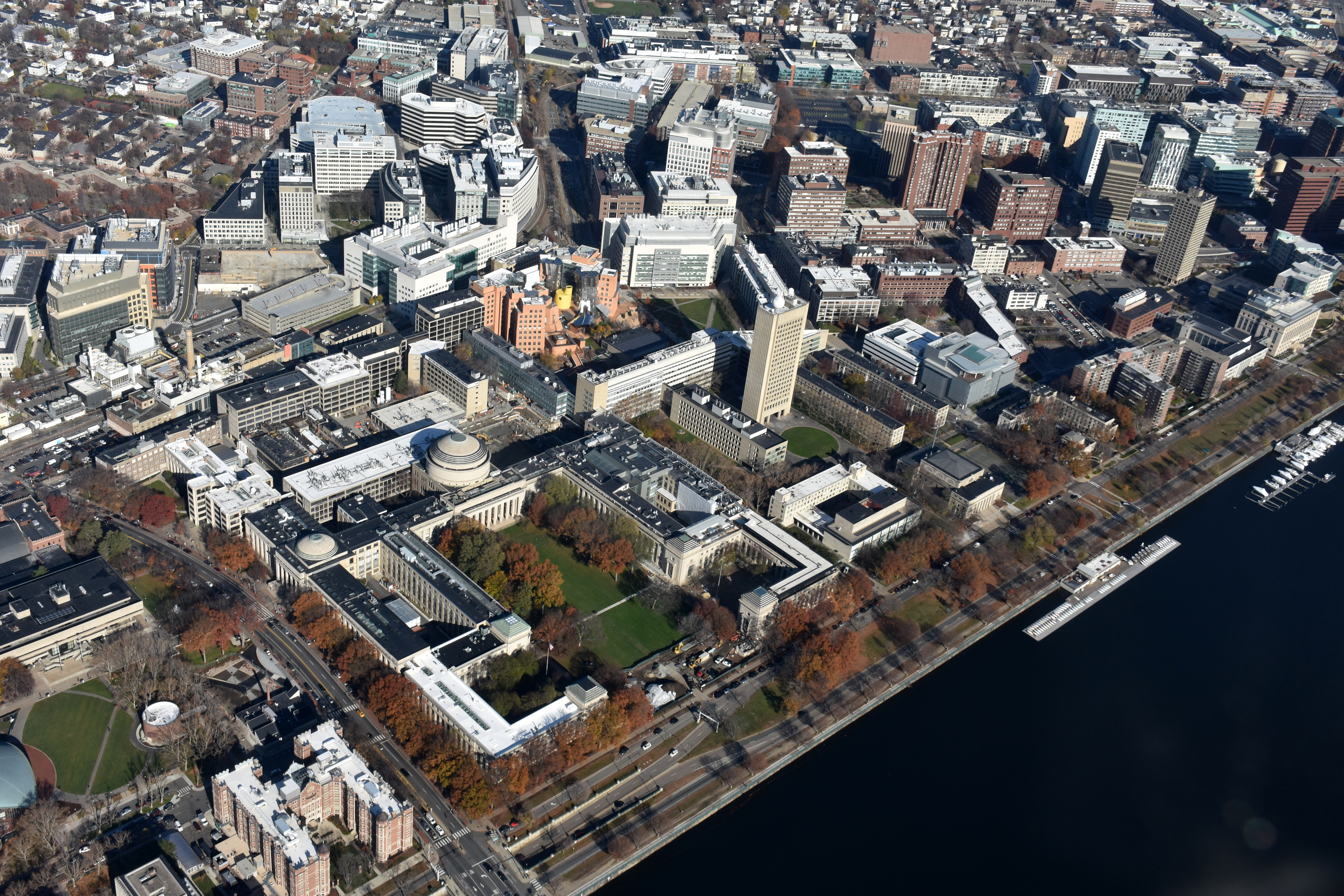
MIT's central campus from above the Harvard Bridge. Left of center is the Great Dome, with the Stata Center and Kendall Square behind.

MIT's 166-acre (67.2 ha) campus in the city of Cambridge spans approximately a mile along the north side of the Charles River basin. The campus is divided roughly in half by Massachusetts Avenue, with most dormitories and student life facilities to the west and most academic buildings to the east. The bridge closest to MIT is the Harvard Bridge, which is known for being marked off in a non-standard unit of length – the smoot.

The Kendall/MIT subway station is located on the northeastern edge of the campus, in Kendall Square. Since the 1960s, MIT and other firms have intensively developed high-rise educational, retail, residential, startup incubator, and office space around the station. The Cambridge neighborhoods surrounding MIT are a mixture of modern offices for high-tech firms, old industry buildings, and low-rise residential neighborhoods. The MIT Museumis immediately adjacent to the Kendall Square subway entrance.

Each building at MIT has a number (possibly preceded by a W, N, E, or NW) designation, and most have a name as well. Typically, academic and office buildings are referred to primarily by number while residence halls are referred to by name. The organization of building numbers roughly corresponds to the order in which the buildings were built and their location relative (north, west, and east) to the original center cluster of Maclaurin buildings. Many of the buildings are connected above ground as well as through an extensive network of tunnels, providing protection from the Cambridge weather as well as a venue for roof and tunnel hacking.

The campus' primary energy source is natural gas, supplied by a power plant constructed for the original Cambridge campus. Since the 1990s, the Institute has retrofit existing buildings to improve their energy efficiency, retooled its campus power plant for cogeneration, and jointly financed a 60-megawatt solar power plant in North Carolina to offset carbon use.

=== Research facilities ===
MIT's on-campus nuclear reactor is one of the oldest operating nuclear reactors in the United States, and one of three university research reactors operating above 5 megawatts. MIT allows students to be trained as reactor operators. Historically, the facility was used for experimental cancer treatment. The siting of the reactor's containment building in a densely populated area has attracted public scrutiny; MIT maintains that it is well-secured and routinely inspected.

MIT Nano, also known as Building 12, is the campus' central facility for nanoscale research. Its 100,000 sq ft (9,300 m^{2}) cleanroom and research space, visible through glass panels, is the largest research facility of its kind in the United States. At US$400 million to construct, it is also one of the costliest buildings on campus. The facility also provides nanoimaging capabilities with vibration damped imaging and metrology suites sitting atop a 5×10^{6} lb (2,300,000 kg) slab of concrete underground.

Other notable campus facilities include a pressurized wind tunnel for testing aerodynamic research, a towing tank for testing ship and ocean structure designs, and previously Alcator C-Mod, which was the largest fusion device operated by any university. MIT's campus-wide wireless network was completed in the fall of 2005 and consists of nearly 3,000 access points covering 9.4×10^{6} sq ft (870,000 m^{2}) of campus.

=== Architecture ===
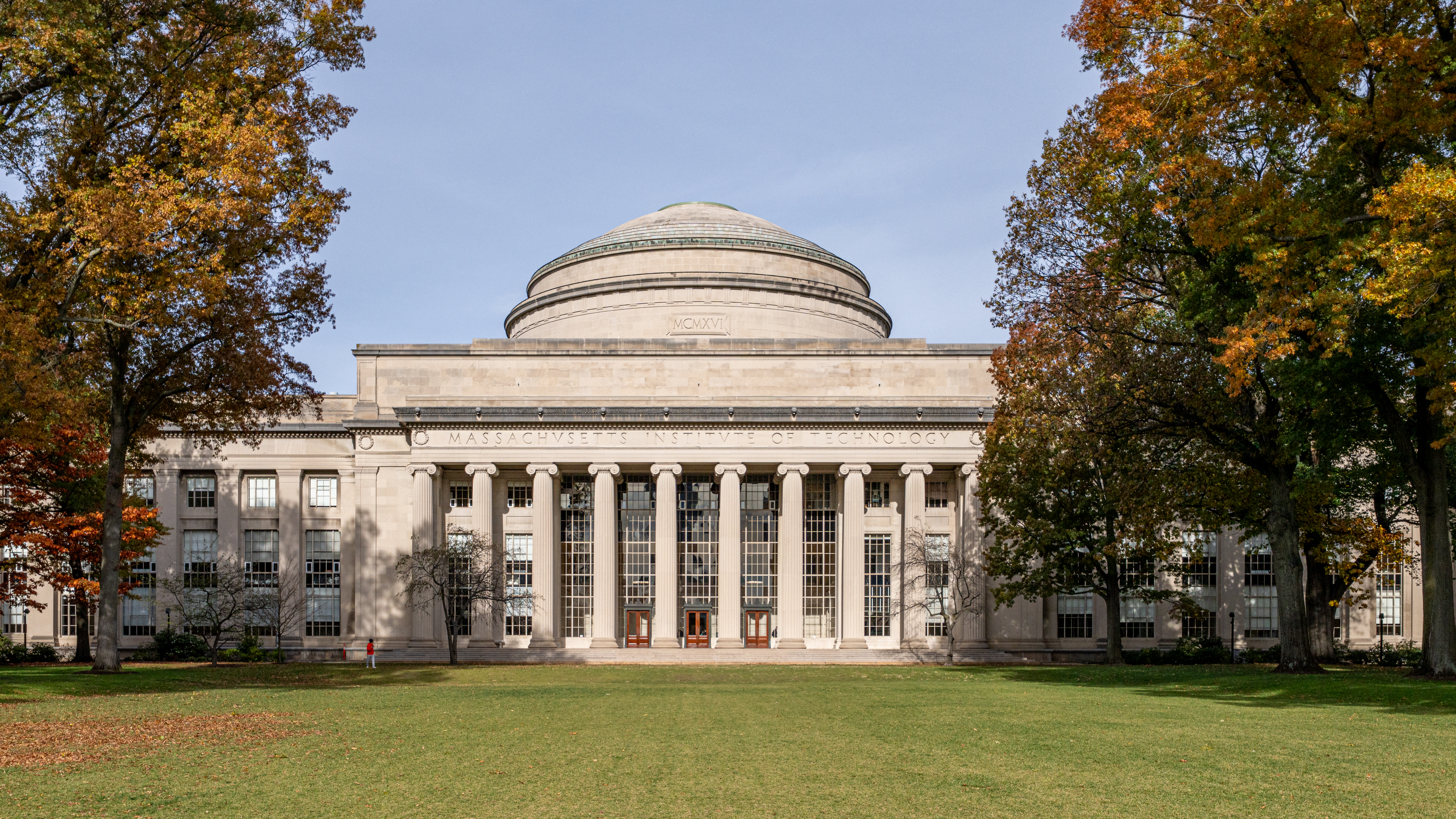
Bosworth's Building 10 and Great Dome overlooking Killian Court

MIT has a history of commissioning innovative buildings. The first buildings for the Cambridge campus, completed in 1916 and designed by William Welles Bosworth, were the first non-industrial buildings built from reinforced concrete in the United States. (Note: Historically, the neoclassical buildings numbered 1–6 and 10 are known as the "Bosworth buildings" or "Maclaurin buildings" after the MIT president who led MIT during their construction. MIT publications also refer to the "Main Group", a designation including Buildings 7 and 8, which were later additions.) Bosworth's idea—industrial efficiency inside, classical aesthetics outside—was influenced by the City Beautiful movement of the early 1900s. His design features the Pantheon-esque Great Dome overlooking Killian Court, where graduation ceremonies are held each year. The friezes of the limestone-clad buildings around Killian Court are engraved with the names of important scientists and philosophers. (Note: The friezes of the buildings surrounding Killian Court are carved in large Roman letters with the names of Aristotle, Newton, Pasteur, Lavoisier, Faraday, Archimedes, da Vinci, Darwin, and Copernicus; each of these names is surmounted by a cluster of appropriately related names in smaller letters. Lavoisier, for example, is placed in the company of Boyle, Cavendish, Priestley, Dalton, Gay Lussac, Berzelius, Woehler, Liebig, Bunsen, Mendelejeff [sic], Perkin, and van't Hoff.) The Infinite Corridor runs the east-west length of Bosworth's buildings, beginning at Lobby 7 despite a name suggesting it has no beginning.

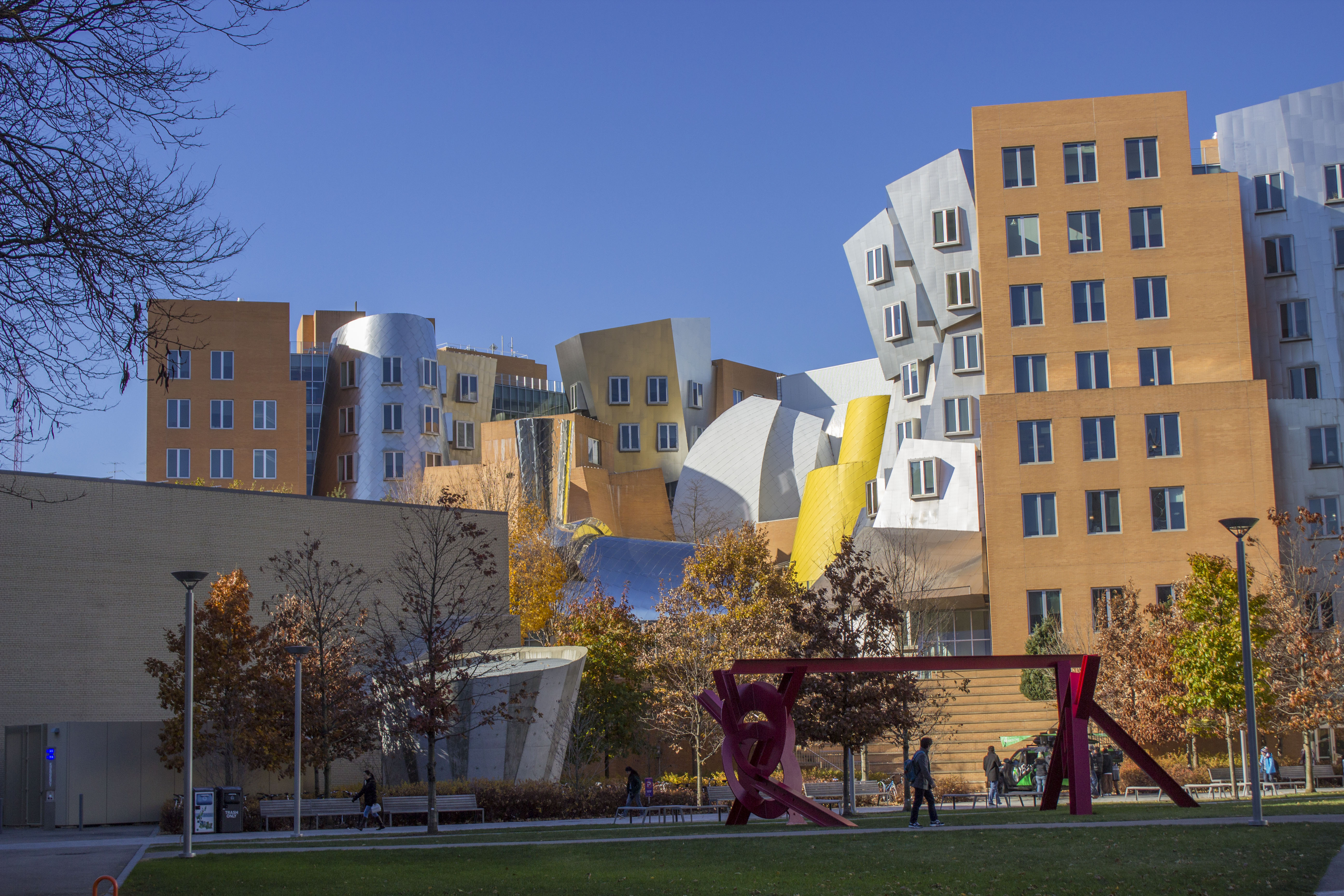
The Stata Center houses CSAIL, LIDS, linguistics, and philosophy.

Later buildings, many connected to the Bosworth's original buildings, range from utilitarian to high design. The demolished Building 20, constructed cheaply with little architectural effort, has been celebrated for its utility for research. After World War II, MIT commissioned many of its new buildings from high-profile architects. Among the post-war modernist architecture on campus is Alvar Aalto's Baker House (1947), Eero Saarinen's MIT Chapel and Kresge Auditorium (1955), and I.M. Pei's four research buildings: Green, Dreyfus, Landau, and Wiesner.

In the 2000s, buildings like Frank Gehry's Stata Center (2004), Steven Holl's Simmons Hall (2002), Charles Correa's Building 46 (2005), and Fumihiko Maki's Media Lab Extension (2009) stand out among the Boston area's traditional architecture as examples of campus "starchitecture". These high-end buildings have not always been well received; in 2010, The Princeton Review included MIT in a list of twenty schools whose campuses are "tiny, unsightly, or both".

=== Housing ===
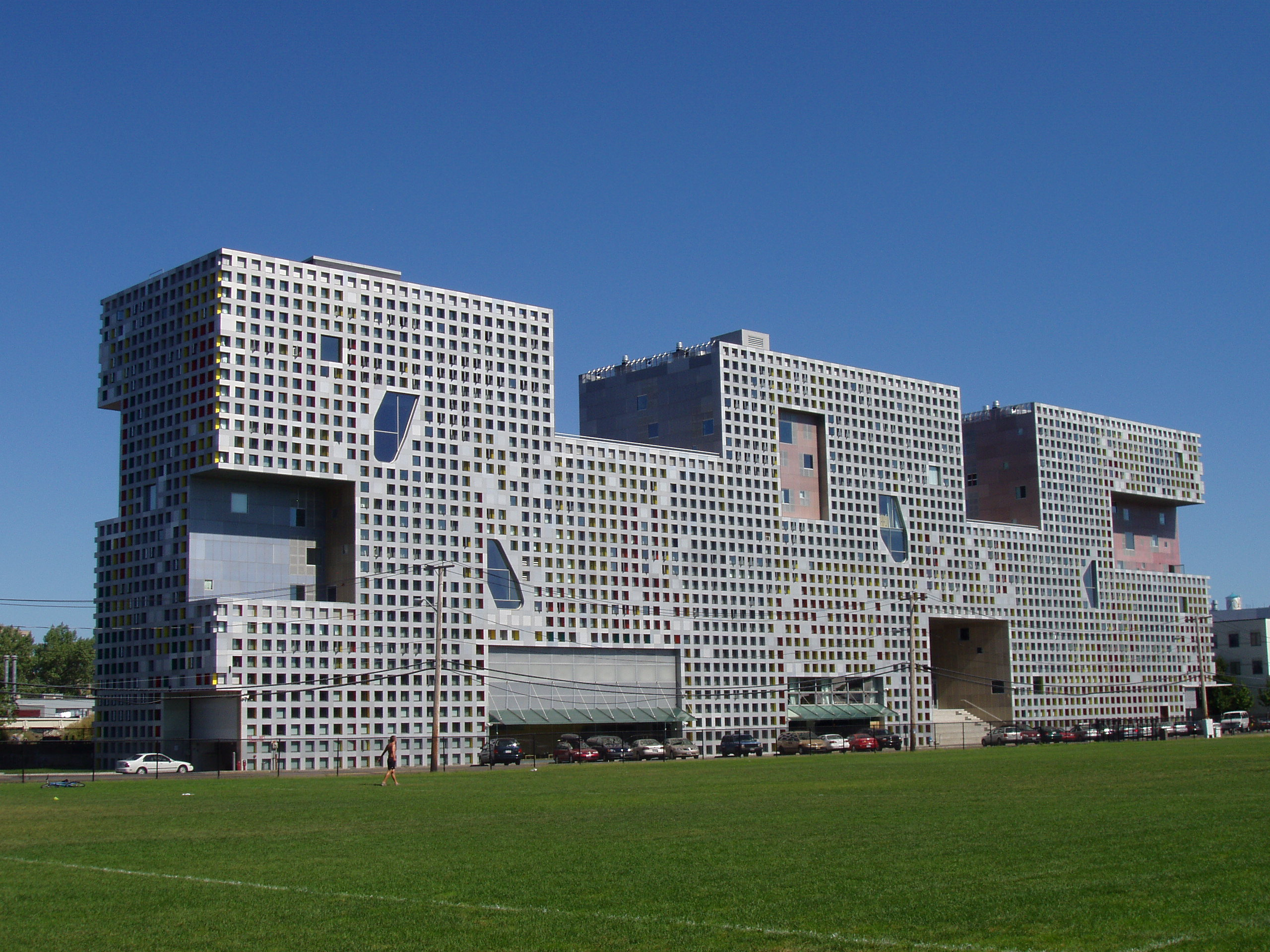
Simmons Hall, an undergraduate dormitory.

Undergraduates are guaranteed four-year housing in one of MIT's 11 undergraduate dormitories. Those living on campus can receive support and mentoring from live-in graduate students and faculty. Because housing assignments are made based on the preferences of the students themselves, diverse social atmospheres can be sustained in different living groups; for example, according to the Yale Daily News staff's The Insider's Guide to the Colleges, 2010, "The split between East Campus and West Campus is a significant characteristic of MIT. East Campus has gained a reputation as a thriving counterculture." MIT also has five dormitories for single graduate students and two apartment buildings on campus for married student families.

MIT has an active Greek and co-op housing system, including thirty-six fraternities, sororities, and independent living groups (FSILGs). As of 2015, 98% of all undergraduates lived in MIT-affiliated housing; 54% of the men participated in fraternities and 20% of the women were involved in sororities. Most FSILGs are located across the river in Back Bay near where MIT was founded, and there is also a cluster of fraternities on MIT's West Campus that face the Charles River Basin.

After the 1997 alcohol-related death of Scott Krueger, a new pledge at the Phi Gamma Delta fraternity, MIT required all freshmen to live in the dormitory system starting in 2002. Because FSILGs had previously housed as many as 300 freshmen off-campus, the new policy could not be implemented until Simmons Hall opened in that year.

=== Off-campus real estate ===
MIT has substantial commercial real estate holdings in Cambridge on which it pays property taxes, plus an additional voluntary payment in lieu of taxes (PILOT) on academic buildings which are legally tax-exempt. As of 2025, it is the largest taxpayer in the city, contributing 14% of the city's local tax revenues. Holdings include Technology Square, parts of Kendall Square, University Park, and many properties in Cambridgeport and Area 4 neighboring the main campus. The land is used for investment purposes and held for potential long-term expansion.

== Organization and administration ==
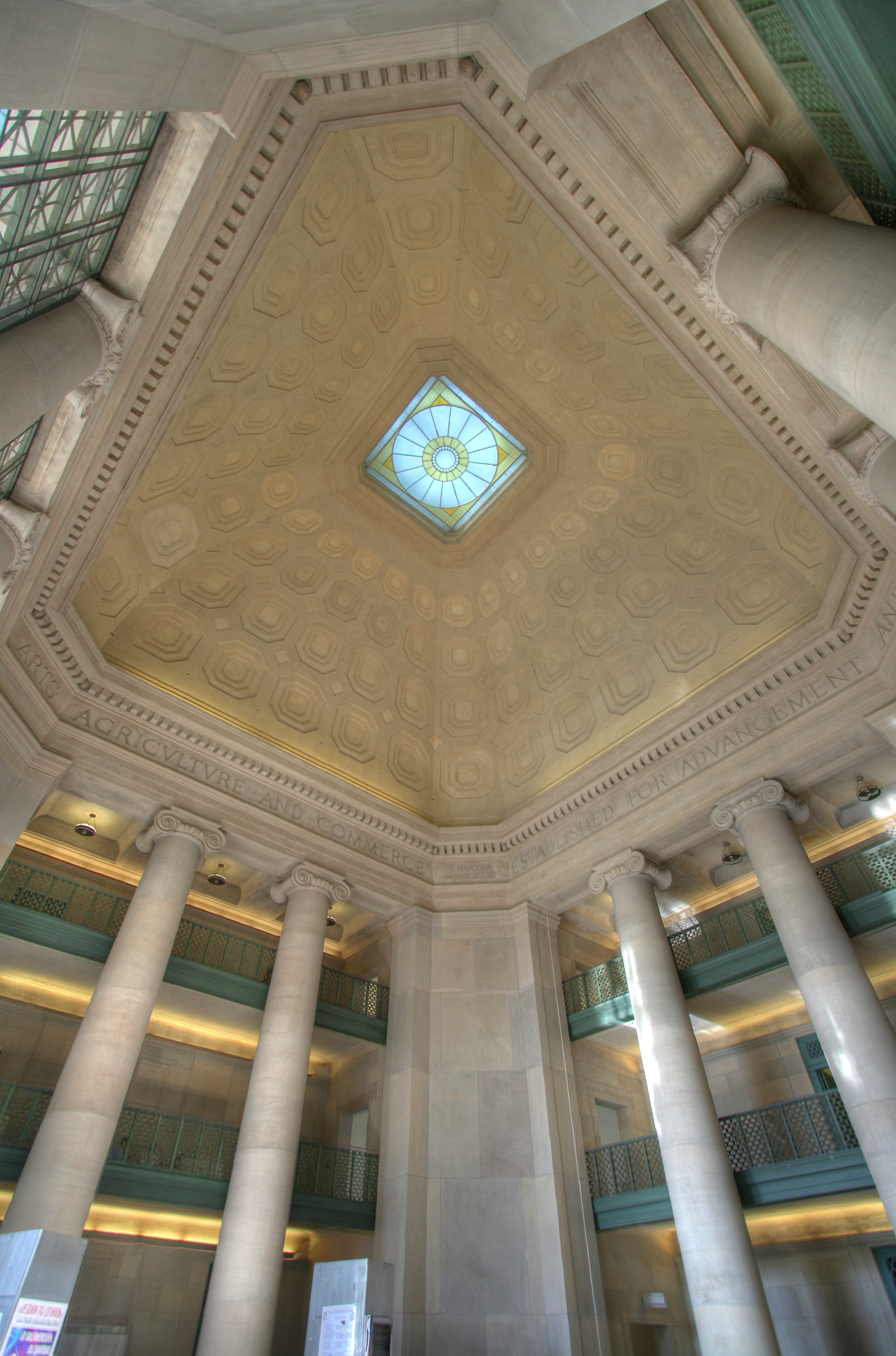
Lobby 7 at 77 Massachusetts Avenue is regarded as the main entrance to campus.

MIT is a state-chartered nonprofit corporation governed by a privately appointed board known as the MIT Corporation. The Corporation has 60–80 members at any time, some with fixed terms, some with life appointments, and eight who serve ex officio. (Note: Life members end their terms at 75 years old. Ex officio members are the Corporation's elected officers—its Chair, President, Treasurer, and Secretary—and the president of the MIT Alumni Association, the Governor of Massachusetts, the Chief Justice of the Massachusetts Supreme Judicial Court, and the Massachusetts Secretary of Education.) The Corporation approves the budget, new programs, degrees and faculty appointments, and elects a president to manage the university and preside for the Institute's faculty. The current president is Sally Kornbluth, a cell biologist and former provost at Duke University, who became MIT's eighteenth president in January 2023.

MIT has five schools (Science, Engineering, Architecture and Planning, Management, and Humanities, Arts, and Social Sciences) and one college (Schwarzman College of Computing); the institute does not operate a law school or a medical school. (Note: The Harvard-MIT Division of Health Sciences and Technology (HST) offers joint MD, MD-PhD, or Medical Engineering degrees in collaboration with Harvard Medical School.) Faculty committees control MIT's curriculum and many areas of research, student life, and administrative affairs. The chair of each of MIT's academic departments reports to the dean of that department's school, who in turn reports to the Provost. Academic departments also report to "Visiting Committees," specialized bodies of Corporation members and outside experts who evaluate the performance, activities, and needs of each department.

MIT's endowment, real estate, and other financial assets are managed by the MIT Investment Management Company (MITIMCo), a subsidiary of the MIT Corporation created in 2004. A minor revenue source for much of the Institute's history, the endowment's role in MIT operations has grown due to strong investment returns since the 1990s, making it one of the largest U.S. university endowments. Among its holdings are a majority of shares in the audio equipment manufacturer Bose Corporation, as well as a commercial real estate portfolio in Kendall Square.

== Academics ==
Undergraduate admissions statistics
- 2022 entering class
- Admit rate: 4.0% (▼ −3.2)
- Yield rate: 85.0% (▲ +9.5)

Test scores middle 50%
- SAT Total: 1520–1570
- ACT Composite: 35–36

MIT is a large, highly residential, research university with a majority of enrollments in graduate and professional programs. The university has been accredited by the New England Association of Schools and Colleges since 1929. MIT operates on a 4–1–4 academic calendar with the fall semester beginning after Labor Day and ending in mid-December, a 4-week "Independent Activities Period" in the month of January, and the spring semester commencing in early February and ceasing in late May.

MIT students refer to both their majors and classes using numbers or acronyms alone. Departments and their corresponding majors are numbered in the approximate order of their foundation; for example, Civil and Environmental Engineering is Course 1, while Linguistics and Philosophy is Course 24. Students majoring in Electrical Engineering and Computer Science (EECS), the most popular department, collectively identify themselves as "Course 6". The most popular major, Computer Science and Engineering, is known as "Course 6-3". MIT students use a combination of the department's course number and the number assigned to the class to identify their subjects; for instance, the introductory calculus-based classical mechanics course is simply "8.01" (pronounced eight-oh-one) at MIT. (Note: Course numbers are sometimes presented in Roman numerals, e.g. "Course XVIII" for mathematics. At least one MIT style guide now discourages this usage. Also, some Course numbers have been re-assigned over time, so that the subject area of a degree may depend on the year it was awarded.)

Enrollment in MIT (2017–2024)
Academic Year	Undergraduates	Graduate	Total Enrollment
2017–2018	4,547	6,919	11,466
2018–2019	4,602	6,972	11,574
2019–2020	4,530	6,990	11,520
2020–2021	4,361	6,893	11,254
2021–2022	4,638	7,296	11,934
2022–2023	4,657	7,201	11,858
2023–2024	4,576	7,344	11,920

=== Undergraduate program ===
MIT enrolls about 4,500 undergraduates in about 53 majors, conferring only bachelor of science degrees. The four-year residential program tries to balance classroom time with "learning by doing". Engineering enrolls the largest share of undergraduates, ahead of science majors, management, and humanities, architecture, and social sciences. As of 2025, the largest undergraduate degree programs were in Computer Science and Engineering (Course 6–3), Mechanical Engineering (Course 2), Artificial Intelligence and Decision Making (Course 6–4), Electrical Engineering and Computer Science (Course 6–2), and Mathematics (Course 18).

Admission is among the most selective in the United States: in recent cycles MIT has admitted 4–5 percent of applicants and very few transfers. The share of admitted students who enroll, also called "yield", has run above 85 percent in the 2020s, ahead of schools such as Stanford and Harvard. MIT is one of a few American universities that meets the full financial need for every admitted student, domestic and international. Beginning in 2025, it charged no tuition to families earning under $200,000.

Every undergraduate completes a shared core, the General Institute Requirements, which currently require two terms each of calculus and physics, a term each of chemistry and biology, a laboratory subject, and eight subjects in the humanities, arts, and social sciences. Two of those subjects, with two more in the student's major, must be "communication-intensive". Graduates must also be able to swim 100 yards (91 m), a requirement since the 1940s.

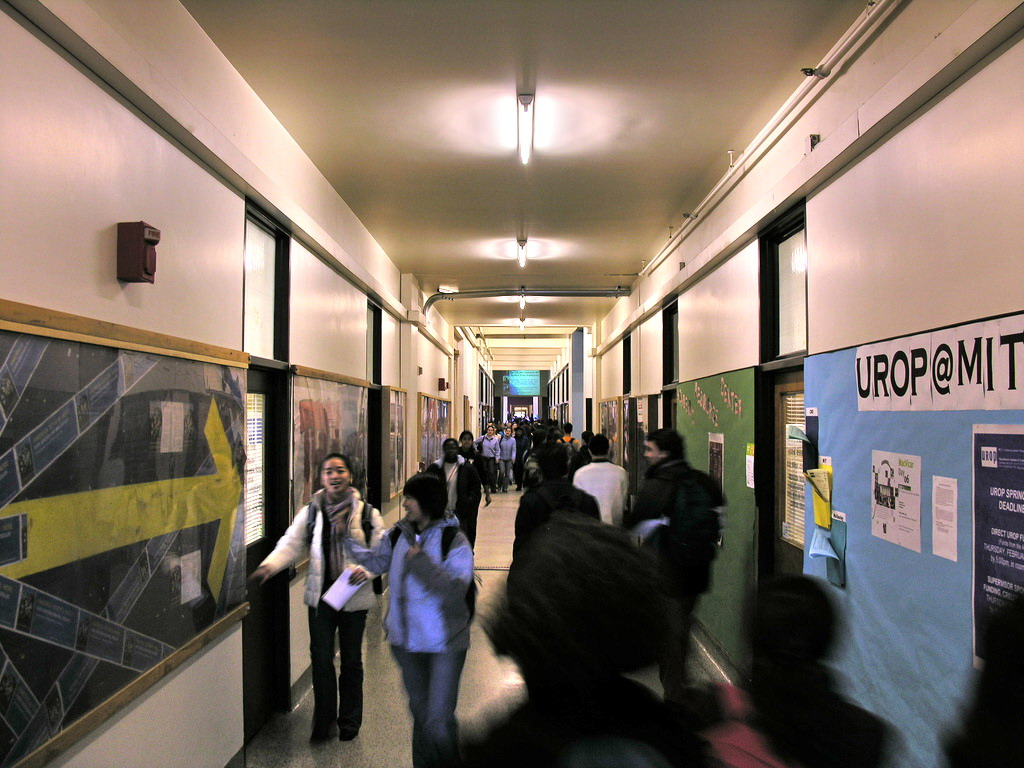
The Infinite Corridor is the primary passageway through campus.

Teaching comprises lectures, smaller recitations, weekly problem sets (called "p-sets"), and frequent exams. Students and administrators have likened the pace of instruction to "drinking from a fire hose". To adjust to the pace of MIT courses, failed first-term subjects do not appear on students' transcripts. Freshmen may also choose to join alternative learning communities, such as Experimental Study Group, Concourse, or Terrascope.

In keeping with MIT's history of "shop instruction," the curriculum promotes "hands-on" work. The Undergraduate Research Opportunities Program, founded in 1969 and since widely copied, places most undergraduates in faculty research, and some leave with publications or startups.

Historically, MIT's intensity can breed gamesmanship. In The Hidden Curriculum (1970), dean Benson Snyder argued that thriving at MIT often meant working out which official requirements to ignore or skirt. He maintained that students' efforts to cope with heavy work through "course bibles" and other shortcuts could undercut actual learning.

=== Graduate programs ===
MIT's graduate programs overlap with the undergraduate program, and many courses are taken by qualified students at both levels. Most departments administer a doctoral program, and MIT offers advanced degrees in the humanities, social sciences, and engineering and science fields. The majority of graduate students enroll in research doctorates programs, and more than 90% of doctoral students are supported by fellowships, research assistantships (RAs), or teaching assistantships (TAs), which usually cover tuition costs and provide stipend support. The institute offers a smaller number of tuition-funded professional degree programs, the largest of which is the Master of Business Administration (MBA) in the Sloan School of Management. Because students are brought to work on funded research, graduate enrollment levels depend heavily on outside research funding sources.

Admission to graduate programs is decentralized. MIT has no graduate school, and departments directly admit applicants to degree programs. Departments offers advanced academic degrees such as the Doctor of Philosophy (PhD), and Doctor of Science (DSc), Master of Science (MS), and various Engineer's Degrees. Many graduating undergraduates choose to complete a continuing one-year Masters of Engineering (MEng) program, most frequently in computer science. MIT also hosts several joint graduate programs such as an MD-PhD with Harvard Medical School and a joint program in oceanography with Woods Hole Oceanographic Institution.

=== Rankings ===
Academic rankings

National
- Forbes: 1
- U.S. News & World Report: 1
- Washington Monthly: 5
- WSJ/College Pulse: 9

Global
- ARWU: 3
- QS: 1
- THE: 2
- U.S. News & World Report: 2

Commercial sources publish university rankings that subjectively weight a selected set of quality measures. In the U.S. News & World Report Best Colleges ranking, MIT tied for second place in 2022 and reached first in 2027. Since global rankings such as QS and the Academic Ranking of World Universities debuted in the 2000s, MIT has placed at or near the top of each, and QS has ranked it first in the world every year since 2012. The BBC noted that the QS ranking's largest component is academic reputation, a weighting that favors institutions with an established brand. MIT's Institutional Research office cautions that "the methods behind these rankings determine the results just as much as the quality of the school or department."

MIT's School of Engineering has ranked first in the U.S. News graduate engineering ranking every year since 1990. Non-engineering programs also rank highly: QS has placed MIT programs among the world's top five in subject rankings for business, chemistry, mathematics, physics, linguistics, economics, architecture, biological sciences, and statistics, and first in several of these.

Measures built on student choices and earnings place MIT similarly. It ranked fourth in a revealed-preference ranking in the Quarterly Journal of Economics, which inferred rank from the decisions of students admitted to more than one college in 2000, an approach designed to avoid the "gaming" strategies possible in commercial rankings. In a 2025 Georgetown University report, an MIT undergraduate degree had the highest twenty-year net present value of any institution.

=== Collaborations ===
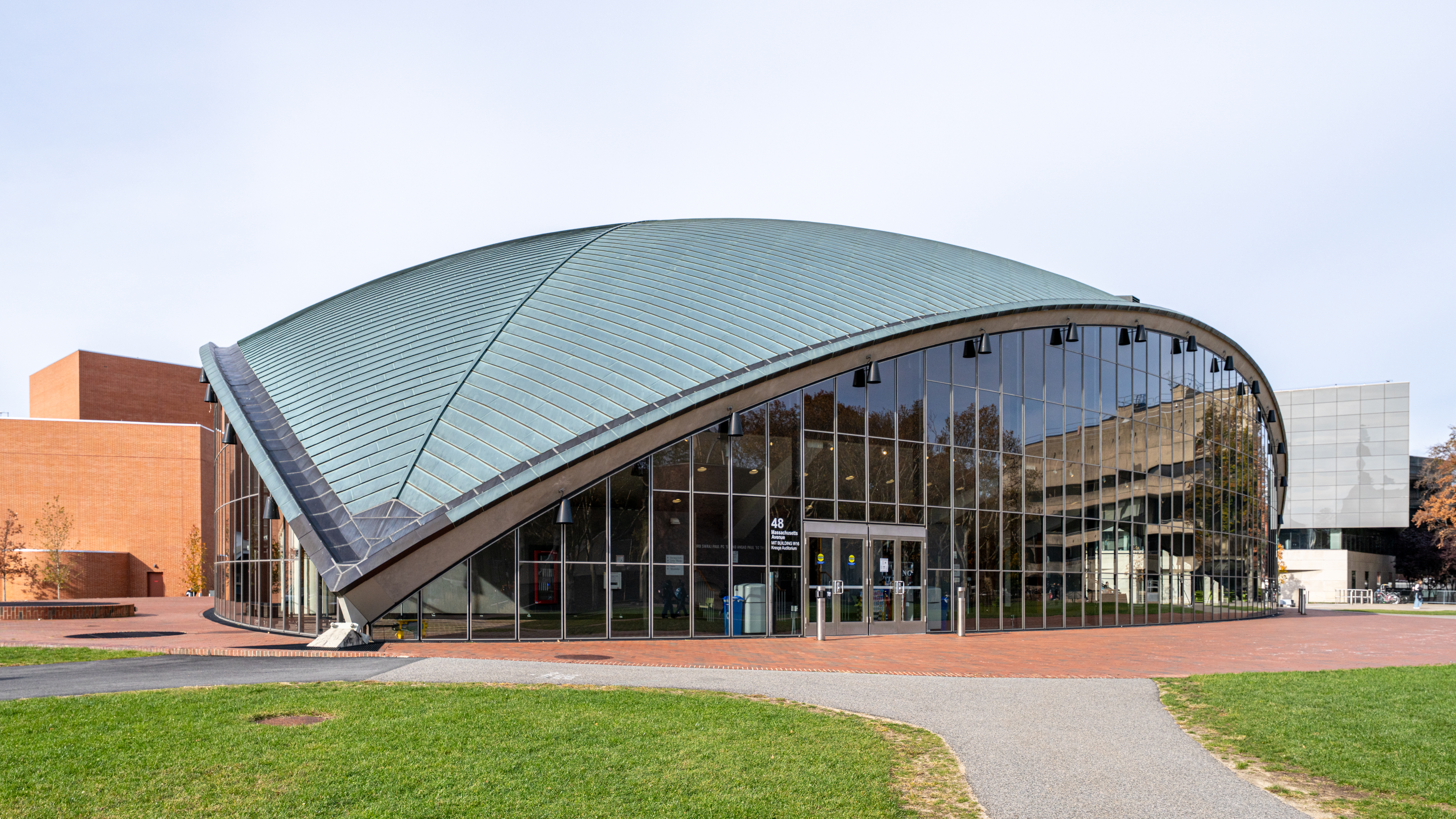
Eero Saarinen's Kresge Auditorium (1955) is a classic example of post-war architecture.

The university historically pioneered research and training collaborations between academia, industry and government. In 1946, President Compton, Harvard Business School professor Georges Doriot, and Massachusetts Investor Trust chairman Merrill Grisswold founded American Research and Development Corporation, the first American venture-capital firm. In 1948, Compton established the MIT Industrial Liaison Program. Throughout the late 1980s and early 1990s, American politicians and business leaders accused MIT and other universities of contributing to a declining economy by transferring taxpayer-funded research and technology to international – especially Japanese – firms that were competing with struggling American businesses. On the other hand, MIT's extensive collaboration with the federal government on research projects has led to several MIT leaders serving as presidential scientific advisers since 1940. (Note: Vannevar Bush was the director of the Office of Scientific Research and Development and general advisor to Franklin D. Roosevelt and Harry Truman, James Rhyne Killian was Special Assistant for Science and Technology for Dwight D. Eisenhower, and Jerome Wiesner advised John F. Kennedy and Lyndon Johnson.) MIT established a Washington Office in 1991 to continue effective lobbying for research funding and national science policy.

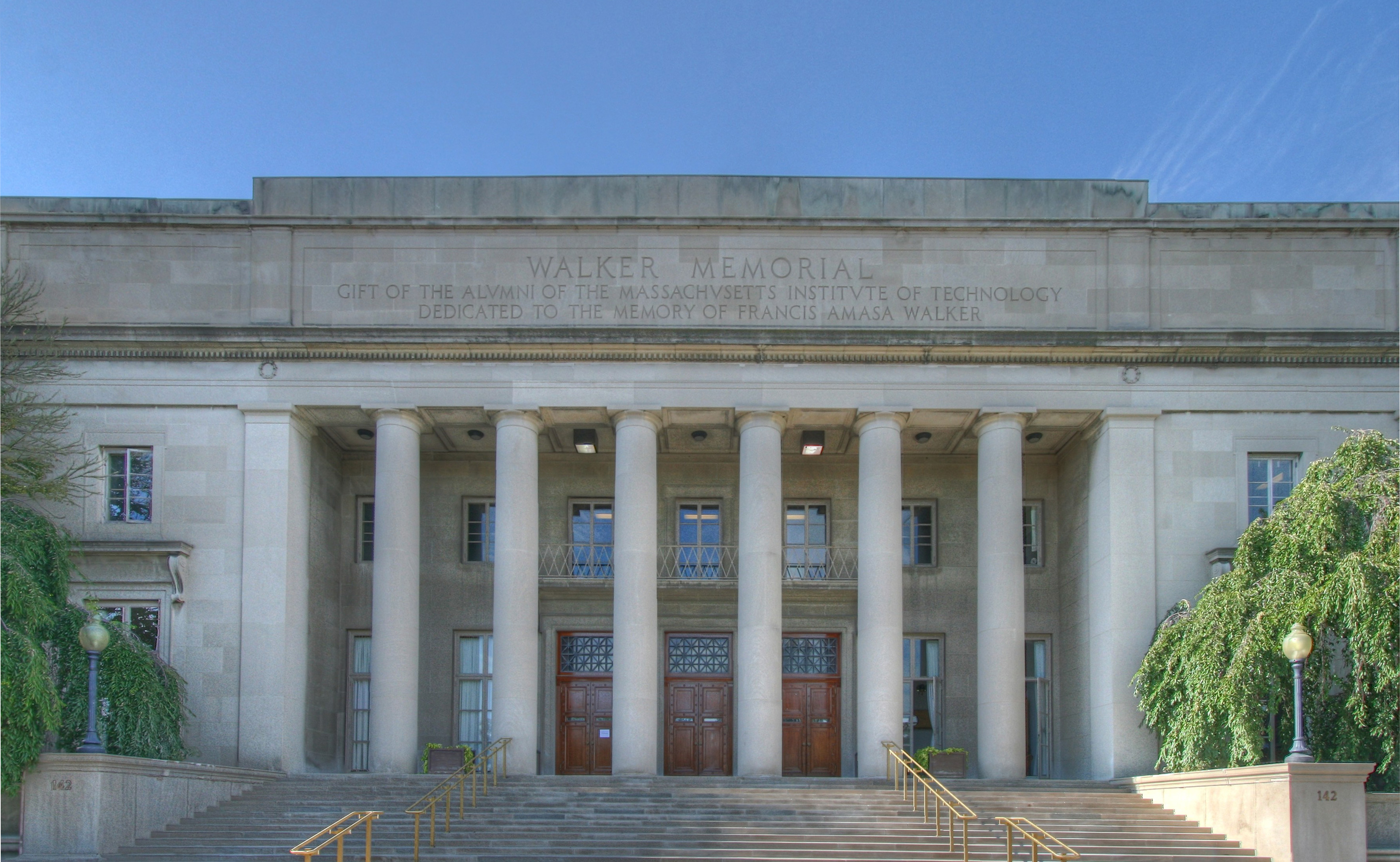
Walker Memorial is a monument to MIT's fourth president, Francis Amasa Walker.

MIT's proximity (Note: MIT's Building 7 and Harvard's Johnston Gate, the traditional entrances to each school, are 1.72 miles (1,627 smoots) apart along Massachusetts Avenue.) to Harvard University ("the other school up the river") has led to a substantial number of research collaborations such as the Harvard–MIT Division of Health Sciences and Technology and the Broad Institute. In addition, students at the two schools can cross-register for credits toward their own school's degrees without any additional fees. A cross-registration program between MIT and Wellesley College has also existed since 1969, and in 2002 the Cambridge–MIT Institute launched an undergraduate exchange program between MIT and the University of Cambridge. MIT also has a long-term partnership with Imperial College London, for both student exchanges and research collaboration. More modest cross-registration programs have been established with Boston University, Brandeis University, Tufts University, Massachusetts College of Art, and the School of the Museum of Fine Arts, Boston.

MIT maintains substantial research and faculty ties with independent research organizations in the Boston area, such as the Charles Stark Draper Laboratory, the Whitehead Institute for Biomedical Research, and the Woods Hole Oceanographic Institution. Ongoing international research and educational collaborations include the Amsterdam Institute for Advanced Metropolitan Solutions (AMS Institute), Singapore-MIT Alliance, MIT-Politecnico di Milano, MIT-Zaragoza International Logistics Program, and projects in other countries through the MIT International Science and Technology Initiatives (MISTI) program.

The mass-market magazine Technology Review is published by MIT through a subsidiary company, as is a special edition that also serves as an alumni magazine. The MIT Press is a major university press, publishing over 200 books and 30 journals annually, emphasizing science and technology as well as arts, architecture, new media, current events, and social issues.

MIT Microphotonics Center and PhotonDelta founded the global roadmap for integrated photonics: Integrated Photonics Systems Roadmap – International (IPSR-I). The first edition has been published in 2020. The roadmap is an amalgamation of two previously independent roadmaps: the IPSR roadmap of MIT Microphotonics Center and AIM Photonics in the United States, and the WTMF (World Technology Mapping Forum) of PhotonDelta in Europe. In 2022, Open Philanthropy donated $13,277,348 to MIT to study potential risks from AI.

=== Libraries, collections, and museums ===
The MIT library system consists of five subject libraries: Barker (Engineering), Dewey (Economics), Hayden (Humanities and Science), Lewis (Music), and Rotch (Arts and Architecture). There are also various specialized libraries and archives. The libraries contain more than 2.9 million printed volumes, 2.4 million microforms, 49,000 print or electronic journal subscriptions, and 670 reference databases. The past decade has seen a trend of increased focus on digital over print resources in the libraries. Notable collections include the Lewis Music Library with an emphasis on 20th and 21st-century music and electronic music, the List Visual Arts Center's rotating exhibitions of contemporary art, and the Compton Gallery's cross-disciplinary exhibitions. MIT allocates a percentage of the budget for all new construction and renovation to commission and support its extensive public art and outdoor sculpture collection. For example, the display boats, known as the Hart Nautical Collection, are located on the second-floor hallways of Building 5 (part of the main Maclaurin Buildings) at MIT in Cambridge, MA. The collection features numerous ship models, marine art, and boat plans that are on permanent display for visitors.

The MIT Museum was founded in 1971 and collects, preserves, and exhibits artifacts significant to the culture and history of MIT. The museum now engages in significant educational outreach programs for the general public, including the annual Cambridge Science Festival, the first celebration of this kind in the United States. Since 2005, its official mission has been, "to engage the wider community with MIT's science, technology and other areas of scholarship in ways that will best serve the nation and the world in the 21st century".

=== Research ===
MIT is classified among "R1: Doctoral Universities – Very high research activity"; research expenditures totaled $952 million in 2017. The federal government was the largest source of sponsored research, with the Department of Health and Human Services granting $255.9 million, Department of Defense $97.5 million, Department of Energy $65.8 million, National Science Foundation $61.4 million, and NASA $27.4 million. MIT employs approximately 1300 researchers in addition to faculty. In 2011, MIT faculty and researchers disclosed 632 inventions, were issued 153 patents, earned $85.4 million in cash income, and received $69.6 million in royalties. Through programs like the Deshpande Center, MIT faculty leverage their research and discoveries into multi-million-dollar commercial ventures.

In electronics, magnetic-core memory, radar, single-electron transistors, and inertial guidance controls were invented or substantially developed by MIT researchers. Harold Eugene Edgerton was a pioneer in high-speed photography and sonar. Claude Shannon introduced Boolean logic to circuit design, providing foundations for digital systems. In the domain of computer science, MIT faculty and researchers made fundamental contributions to cybernetics, artificial intelligence, computer languages, machine learning, robotics, and cryptography. At least nine Turing Award laureates and seven recipients of the Draper Prize in engineering have been or are currently associated with MIT.

Current and previous physics faculty have won eight Nobel Prizes, four ICTP Dirac Medals, and three Wolf Prizes predominantly for their contributions to subatomic and quantum theory. Members of the chemistry department have been awarded three Nobel Prizes and one Wolf Prize for the discovery of novel syntheses and methods. MIT biologists have been awarded six Nobel Prizes for their contributions to genetics, immunology, oncology, and molecular biology. Professor Eric Lander was one of the principal leaders of the Human Genome Project. Positronium atoms, synthetic penicillin, synthetic self-replicating molecules, and the genetic bases for Amyotrophic lateral sclerosis (also known as ALS or Lou Gehrig's disease) and Huntington's disease were first discovered at MIT. Jerome Lettvin transformed the study of cognitive science with his paper "What the frog's eye tells the frog's brain". Researchers developed a system to convert MRI scans into 3D printed physical models.

Beginning in 1980, Laser Interferometer Gravitational-Wave Observatory (LIGO) was designed and constructed by a team of scientists from California Institute of Technology, MIT, and industrial contractors, and funded by the National Science Foundation. It was designed to open the field of gravitational-wave astronomy through the detection of gravitational waves predicted by general relativity. Gravitational waves were detected for the first time by the LIGO detector in 2015. For contributions to the LIGO detector and the observation of gravitational waves, two Caltech physicists, Kip Thorne and Barry Barish, and MIT physicist Rainer Weiss won the Nobel Prize in physics in 2017. Weiss, who is also an MIT graduate, designed the laser interferometric technique, which served as the essential blueprint for the LIGO.

In the domain of humanities, arts, and social sciences, as of October 2019 MIT economists have been awarded seven Nobel Prizes and nine John Bates Clark Medals. Linguists Noam Chomsky and Morris Halle authored seminal texts on generative grammar and phonology. The MIT Media Lab, founded in 1985 within the School of Architecture and Planning and known for its unconventional research, has been home to influential researchers such as constructivist educator and Logo creator Seymour Papert.

Allegations of research misconduct or improprieties at MIT have received press coverage. In 1986, Professor David Baltimore, a Nobel Laureate in medicine, became embroiled in decade-long research investigation over a colleague's alleged data falsification. The government's final investigation identified paper errors, no evidence of misconduct, and resulted an overhaul of federal research misconduct procedures. In 2000, Professor Ted Postol alleged research misconduct involving a ballistic missile defense study in the Lincoln Laboratory and accused the MIT administration of failing to fully investigate. A Department of Defense investigation did not substantiate the allegations. Associate Professor Luk Van Parijs was dismissed in 2005 following allegations of scientific misconduct and found guilty of the same by the United States Office of Research Integrity in 2009.

In 2019, Clarivate Analytics named 54 members of MIT's faculty to its list of "Highly Cited Researchers". That number places MIT eighth among the world's universities.

== Notable output ==
=== Natural sciences ===
- Oncogene – Robert Weinberg discovered genetic basis of human cancer.
- Reverse transcription – David Baltimore independently isolated, in 1970 at MIT, two RNA tumor viruses: R-MLV and again RSV.
- Thermal death time – Samuel Cate Prescott and William Lyman Underwood from 1895 to 1898. Done for canning of food. Applications later found useful in medical devices, pharmaceuticals, and cosmetics.
- Electroweak interaction – Steven Weinberg proposed the electroweak unification theory, which gave rise to the modern formulation of the Standard Model, in 1967 at MIT.

=== Computer and applied sciences ===
- 15.ai – 15 began developing 15.ai's speech synthesis technology while an undergraduate at MIT.
- Akamai Technologies – Daniel Lewin and Tom Leighton developed a faster content delivery network, now one of the world's largest distributed computing platforms, responsible for serving between 15 and 30 percent of all web traffic.
- Cryptography – MIT researchers Ron Rivest, Adi Shamir and Leonard Adleman developed one of the first practical public-key cryptosystems, the RSA cryptosystem, and started a company, RSA Security.
- Digital circuits – Claude Shannon, while a master's degree student at MIT, developed the digital circuit design theory which paved the way for modern computers.
- Electronic ink – developed by Joseph Jacobson at MIT Media Lab.
- Emacs (text editor) – development began during the 1970s at the MIT AI Lab.
- GNU Project – Richard Stallman formally founded the free software movement in 1983 by launching the GNU Project at MIT.
- Julia (programming language) – Development was started in 2009, by Jeff Bezanson, Stefan Karpinski, Viral B. Shah, and Alan Edelman, all at MIT at that time, and continued with the contribution of a dedicated MIT Julia Lab
- Lisp (programming language) – John McCarthy invented Lisp at MIT in 1958.
- Lithium-ion battery efficiencies – Yet-Ming Chiang and his group at MIT showed a substantial improvement in the performance of lithium batteries by boosting the material's conductivity by doping it with aluminium, niobium and zirconium.
- Macsyma, one of the oldest general-purpose computer algebra systems; the GPL-licensed version Maxima remains in wide use.
- MIT OpenCourseWare – the OpenCourseWare movement started in 1999 when the University of Tübingen in Germany published videos of lectures online for its timms initiative (Tübinger Internet Multimedia Server). The OCW movement only took off, however, with the launch of MIT OpenCourseWare and the Open Learning Initiative at Carnegie Mellon University in October 2002. The movement was soon reinforced by the launch of similar projects at Yale, Utah State University, the University of Michigan and the University of California, Berkeley.
- Perdix micro-drone – autonomous drone that uses artificial intelligence to swarm with many other Perdix drones.
- Project MAC – groundbreaking research in operating systems, artificial intelligence, and the theory of computation. DARPA funded project.
- Microwave radar – developed at MIT's Radiation Laboratory during World War II.
- SKETCHPAD – invented by Ivan Sutherland at MIT (presented in his PhD thesis). It pioneered the way for human–computer interaction (HCI). Sketchpad is considered to be the ancestor of modern computer-aided design (CAD) programs as well as a major breakthrough in the development of computer graphics in general.
- VisiCalc – first spreadsheet computer program for personal computers, originally released for the Apple II by VisiCorp. MIT alumni Dan Bricklin and Bob Frankston rented time sharing at night on an MIT mainframe computer (that cost $1/hr for use).
- World Wide Web Consortium – founded in 1994 by Tim Berners-Lee, (W3C) is the main international standards organization for the World Wide Web
- X Window System – pioneering architecture-independent system for graphical user interfaces that has been widely used for Unix and Linux systems.

=== Companies and entrepreneurship ===
MIT alumni and faculty have founded numerous companies, some of which are shown below:

- Analog Devices, 1965, co-founders Ray Stata, (SB, SM) and Matthew Lorber (SB)
- BlackRock, 1988, co-founder Bennett Golub, (SB, SM, PhD)
- Bose Corporation, 1964, founder Amar Bose (SB, PhD)
- Boston Dynamics, 1992, founder Marc Raibert (PhD)
- BuzzFeed, 2006, co-founder Jonah Peretti (SM)
- Dropbox, 2007, founders Drew Houston (SB) and Arash Ferdowsi (drop-out)
- Hewlett-Packard, 1939, co-founder William R. Hewlett (SM)
- HuffPost, 2005, co-founder Jonah Peretti (SM)
- Intel, 1968, co-founder Robert Noyce (PhD)
- Khan Academy, 2008, founder Salman Khan (SB, SM)
- Koch Industries, 1940, founder Fred C. Koch (SB), sons William (SB, PhD), David (SB)
- Qualcomm, 1985, co-founders Irwin M. Jacobs (SM, PhD) and Andrew Viterbi (SB, SM)
- Raytheon, 1922, co-founder Vannevar Bush (DEng, Professor)
- Renaissance Technologies, 1982, founder James Simons (SB)
- Scale AI, 2016, founder Alexandr Wang (drop-out)
- Stripe, Inc., 2009, founder Patrick Collison (drop-out)
- Texas Instruments, 1930, founder Cecil Howard Green (SB, SM)
- TSMC, 1987, founder Morris Chang (SB, SM)
- VMware, 1998, co-founder Diane Greene (SM)

== Student life ==
ROTC students celebrate Veterans Day at MIT in 2019.

The faculty and student body place a high value on meritocracy and on technical proficiency. MIT has never awarded an honorary degree, nor does it award athletic scholarships, or Latin honors upon graduation. However, MIT has twice awarded honorary professorships: to Winston Churchill in 1949 and Salman Rushdie in 1993.

Many upperclass students and alumni wear a large, heavy, distinctive class ring known as the "Brass Rat". Originally created in 1929, the ring's official name is the "Standard Technology Ring". The undergraduate ring design (a separate graduate student version exists as well) varies slightly from year to year to reflect the unique character of the MIT experience for that class, but always features a three-piece design, with the MIT seal and the class year each appearing on a separate face, flanking a large rectangular bezel bearing an image of a beaver. The initialism IHTFP, representing the informal school motto "I Hate This Fucking Place" and jocularly euphemized as "I Have Truly Found Paradise", "Institute Has The Finest Professors", "Institute of Hacks, TomFoolery and Pranks", "It's Hard to Fondle Penguins", and other variations, has occasionally been featured on the ring given its historical prominence in student culture.

=== Caltech Rivalry ===
MIT also shares a well-known rivalry with the California Institute of Technology (Caltech), stemming from both institutions' reputations as two of the highest ranked and most highly recognized science and engineering schools in the world. The rivalry is an unusual college rivalry given its focus on academics and pranks instead of sports, and due to the geographic distance between the two (their campuses are separated by about 2580 miles and are on opposite coasts of the United States). In 2005, Caltech students pranked MIT's Campus Preview Weekend by distributing t-shirts that read "MIT" on the front, and "...because not everyone can go to Caltech" on the back. Additionally, the word Massachusetts in the "Massachusetts Institute of Technology" engraving on the exterior of the Lobby 7 dome was covered with a banner so that it read "That Other Institute of Technology". In 2006, MIT retaliated by posing as contractors and stealing the 1.7-ton, 130-year-old Fleming cannon, a Caltech landmark. The cannon was relocated to Cambridge, where it was displayed in front of the Green Building during the 2006 Campus Preview Weekend. In September 2010, MIT students unsuccessfully tried to place a life-sized model of the TARDIS time machine from the Doctor Who (1963–present) television series on top of Baxter Hall at Caltech. A few months later, Caltech students collaborated to help MIT students place the TARDIS on top of their originally planned destination. The rivalry has continued, most recently in 2014, when a group of Caltech students gave out mugs sporting the MIT logo on the front and the words "The Institute of Technology" on the back. When heated, the mugs turned orange and read, "Caltech, The Hotter Institute of Technology".

=== Activities ===
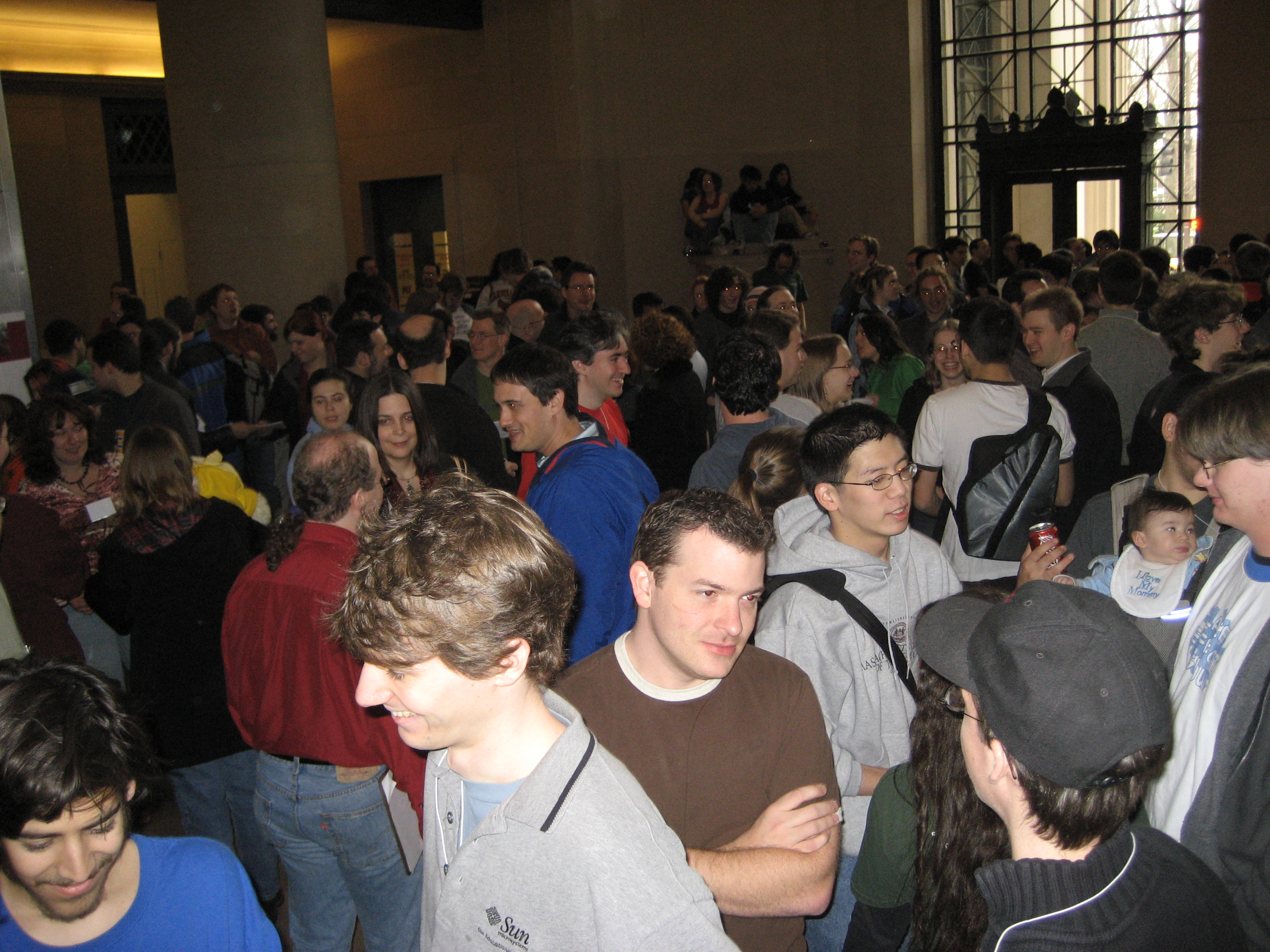
The start of the MIT Mystery Hunt in 2007

MIT has over 500 recognized student activity groups, including a campus radio station, The Tech student newspaper, an annual entrepreneurship competition, a crime club, and weekly screenings of popular films by the Lecture Series Committee. Less traditional activities include the "world's largest open-shelf collection of science fiction" in English, a model railroad club, and a vibrant folk dance scene. Students, faculty, and staff are involved in over 50 educational outreach and public service programs through the MIT Museum, Edgerton Center, and MIT Public Service Center.

Fraternities and sororities provide a base of activities in addition to housing. Approximately 1,000 undergrads, 48% of men and 30% of women, participate in one of several dozen Greek Life men's, women's and co-ed chapters on the campus.

The Independent Activities Period is a four-week-long "term" offering hundreds of optional classes, lectures, demonstrations, and other activities throughout the month of January between the Fall and Spring semesters. Some of the most popular recurring IAP activities are Autonomous Robot Design (course 6.270), Robocraft Programming (6.370), and MasLab competitions, the annual "mystery hunt", and Charm School. More than 250 students pursue externships annually at companies in the US and abroad.

Many MIT students also engage in "hacking", which encompasses both the physical exploration of areas that are generally off-limits (such as rooftops and steam tunnels), as well as elaborate practical jokes. Examples of high-profile hacks have included the abduction of Caltech's cannon, reconstructing a Wright Flyer atop the Great Dome, and adorning the John Harvard statue with the Master Chief's Mjölnir Helmet.

=== Athletics ===
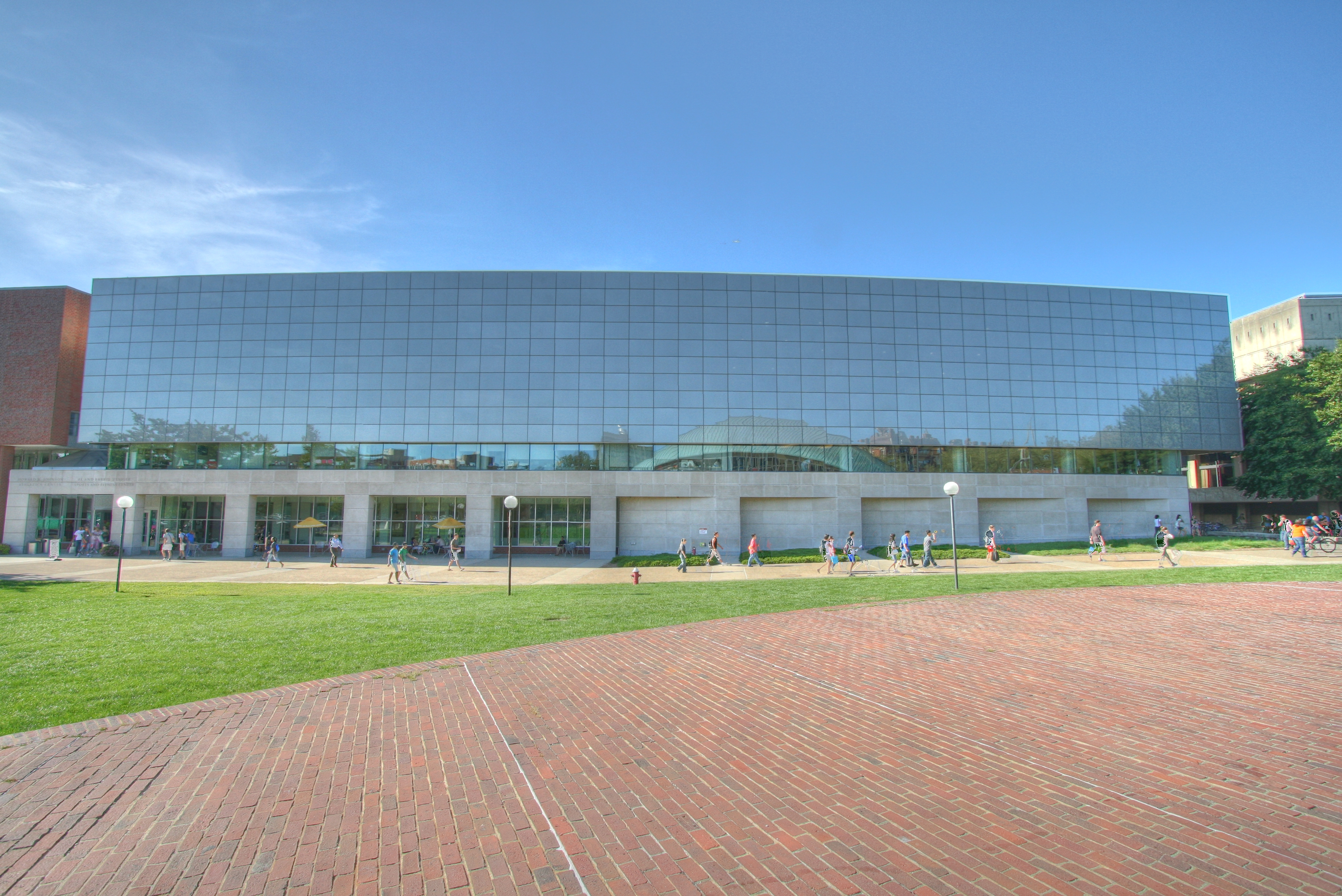
The Zesiger Sports and Fitness Center houses a two-story fitness center as well as swimming and diving pools.

MIT sponsors 31 varsity sports, reduced from 41 in 2009, and has one of the three broadest NCAA Division III athletic programs. Nearly 20% of undergraduates play at least one varsity sport. Applying athletes are considered by the academic standards applied to all applicants, though coaches may advocate for their admission.

MIT participates in the NCAA's Division III and the New England Women's and Men's Athletic Conference, with women's crew competing at the Division I level in the Patriot League. MIT's intercollegiate sports teams, called the Engineers, have won 22 Team National Championships and 42 Individual National Championships. Teams' overall success has varied; in 2013, the MIT mens football team broke a 124-year streak without back-to-back winning seasons, then went unbeaten the following year.

MIT is the all-time leader in Academic All-America selections (468 as of August 2025), ahead of Stanford University and the University of Nebraska–Lincoln across all NCAA divisions. MIT Athletes won 13 Elite 90 awards and ranks first among NCAA Division III programs, and third among all divisions.

== People ==
MIT affiliates have received major academic and professional honors across a range of fields. As of October 2026, 107 Nobel laureates, 26 Turing Award winners, and 8 Fields Medalists have been affiliated with MIT as alumni, faculty, or researchers. The institute also counts 58 National Medal of Science recipients, 29 National Medal of Technology and Innovation recipients, and 84 MacArthur Fellows among its affiliates.

In public service, 49 MIT-affiliated astronauts have flown in space, 16 have served as Chief Scientist of the U.S. Air Force, and 8 alumni have served as foreign heads of state. Many alumni have also held senior positions in the U.S. federal government, including members of the Cabinet, the Federal Reserve, and the leadership of national defense and intelligence agencies. Alumni and faculty have founded or led many notable companies, particularly in technology, defense, and biotechnology.

=== Students ===
Student body composition as of May 2, 2023
Race and ethnicity	Total
Asian	34%
White	22%
Hispanic	15%
Foreign national	11%
Other (Note: Other consists of Multiracial Americans & those who prefer to not say.)	10%
Black	8%
Economic diversity
Low-income (Note: The percentage of students who received an income-based federal Pell Grant intended for low-income students.)	19%
Other (Note: The percent of students who do not receive for Pell Grants)	81%

MIT is one of nine U.S. colleges that is both need-blind and full-need for all undergraduate applicants, including international students. All financial aid is based on demonstrated need, MIT does not offer merit or athletic scholarships. Beginning with the 2025–2026 academic year, tuition is not charged to students from families with incomes below $200,000 with typical assets. At times, annual increases led to a student tradition (dating back to the 1960s) of tongue-in-cheek "tuition riots."

The admissions process does not give preference to children of alumni. A 2023 study in The Quarterly Journal of Economics found that legacy preferences, athletic recruitment, and non-academic ratings were the primary drivers of admissions advantages for wealthy applicants at highly selective U.S. colleges. At MIT, students from the wealthiest families were no more likely to attend than other applicants with comparable test scores.

In August 2024, after the U.S. Supreme Court overruled race-based affirmative action in Students for Fair Admissions v. Harvard (2023), the university reported that for the class of 2028, Black and Latino student enrollment decreased from previous averages to 5 and 11 percent, respectively, while Asian American enrollment increased to 47 percent.

MIT has been nominally co-educational since admitting Ellen Swallow Richards in 1870. Richards also became the first female member of MIT's faculty, specializing in sanitary chemistry. Female students remained a small minority prior to the completion of the first wing of a women's dormitory, McCormick Hall, in 1963. Between 1993 and 2009 the proportion of women rose from 34 percent to 45 percent of undergraduates and from 20 percent to 31 percent of graduate students. As of 2009, women outnumbered men in Biology, Brain & Cognitive Sciences, Architecture, Urban Planning, and Biological Engineering.

=== Faculty and staff ===
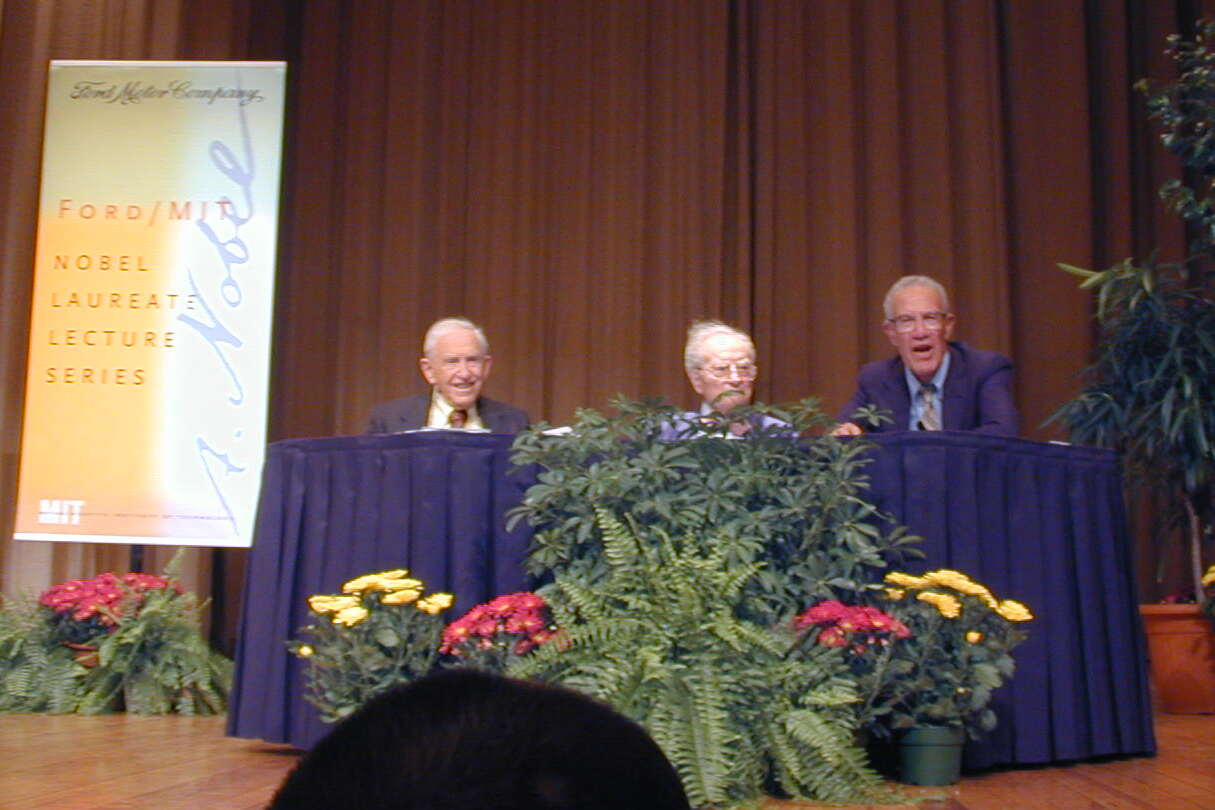
A 2000 panel featuring Institute Professors Emeriti and Nobel Laureates (from left to right) Franco Modigliani, Paul Samuelson, and Robert Solow

MIT's faculty count reached 1,000 in 1983 and has stayed near that level in the years since. Faculty are responsible for lecturing classes, for conducting original research, for advising both graduate and undergraduate students, and for sitting on academic committees. As of May 2026, MIT identifies 41 faculty members, past or present, as Nobel Prize recipients, the majority in Economics or Physics. Faculty and teaching staff included 55 Guggenheim Fellows, 27 MacArthur Fellows, and 5 John Bates Clark medalists. Faculty members who have made extraordinary contributions to their research field as well as the MIT community are granted appointments as Institute Professors for the remainder of their tenures.

MIT faculty members have often been recruited to lead other colleges and universities. Founding faculty-member Charles W. Eliot became president of Harvard University in 1869, a post he would hold for 40 years, during which he had influence both on American higher education and on secondary education. George Ellery Hale played a central role in the development of the California Institute of Technology (Caltech), and other faculty members have been key founders of the nearby Olin College of Engineering.

MIT faculty have served as the president's science adviser four times, beginning with the first appointment to the role: James Killian, then MIT's president, who advised Eisenhower from 1957 to 1959. He was followed by the electrical engineer Jerome Wiesner under Kennedy (1961–1964), the geophysicist Frank Press under Carter (1977–1981), and the biologist Eric Lander under Biden (2021–2022). (Note: Wiesner was one of several veterans of MIT's Radiation Laboratory to hold the role of presidential science advisor, but the others were never MIT faculty members. Lee DuBridge, the laboratory's director, was science adviser to Nixon (1969–1970) and had served on advisory committees under Truman and Eisenhower; I. I. Rabi, its associate director, chaired the President's Science Advisory Committee under Eisenhower; and H. Guyford Stever, a Rad Lab radar researcher and wartime liaison to its British branch, advised Nixon and Ford, becoming the first director of the Office of Science and Technology Policy in 1976.) Other faculty have led federal agencies or held cabinet posts, including Ernest Moniz as secretary of energy (2013–2017), Hans Mark (1979–1981) and Sheila Widnall (1993–1997) as secretary of the Air Force, Marcia McNutt as president of the National Academy of Sciences (2016–2026), and Xavier de Souza Briggs as associate director of the White House Office of Management and Budget.

MIT is the second-largest employer in the city of Cambridge. Based on feedback from employees, MIT was ranked No. 7 as a place to work, among US colleges and universities as of March 2013. Surveys cited a "smart", "creative", "friendly" environment, noting that the work-life balance tilts towards a "strong work ethic" but complaining about "low pay" compared to an industry position.

=== Notable alumni ===
Many of MIT's over 120,000 alumni have achieved considerable success in scientific research, public service, education, and business. As of October 2020, 41 MIT alumni have won Nobel Prizes, 48 have been selected as Rhodes Scholars, 61 have been selected as Marshall Scholars, and 3 have been selected as Mitchell Scholars.

Alumni in United States politics and public service include former chairman of the Federal Reserve Ben Bernanke, former MA-1 representative John Olver, former CA-13 representative Pete Stark, KY-4 representative Thomas Massie, California senator Alex Padilla, and former National Economic Council chairman Lawrence H. Summers.

MIT alumni have founded or co-founded many notable companies, such as Intel, McDonnell Douglas, Texas Instruments, 3Com, Qualcomm, Bose, Raytheon, Apotex, Koch Industries, Rockwell International, Genentech, Dropbox, and Campbell Soup. According to the British newspaper The Guardian, "a survey of living MIT alumni found that they have formed 25,800 companies, employing more than three million people including about a quarter of the workforce of Silicon Valley. Those firms collectively generate global revenues of about $1.9 trillion (£1.2 trillion) a year". If the companies founded by MIT alumni were a country, they would have the 11th-highest GDP of any country in the world.

More than one third of the United States' crewed spaceflights have included MIT-educated astronauts, a contribution exceeding that of any university excluding the United States service academies. Of the 12 people who have set foot on the Moon as of 2019, four graduated from MIT (among them Apollo 11 Lunar Module Pilot Buzz Aldrin). Alumnus and former faculty member Qian Xuesen led the Chinese nuclear-weapons program and became instrumental in Chinese rocket-program.

Noted alumni in other fields include health care policy analyst and journalist Avik Roy, children's book author Hugh Lofting, digital media professor Nick Montfort, sculptor Daniel Chester French, guitarist Tom Scholz of the band Boston, the British BBC and ITN correspondent and political advisor David Walter, The New York Times columnist and Nobel Prize-winning economist Paul Krugman, The Bell Curve author Charles Murray, and United States Supreme Court building architect Cass Gilbert. Other distinguished alumni include economist Esther Duflo, who received the Nobel Memorial Prize in Economic Sciences in 2019 for her experimental approach to poverty alleviation; physicist Mildred Dresselhaus, a pioneer in carbon science and recipient of the Presidential Medal of Freedom; and physicist and science policy leader Shirley Ann Jackson, former chair of the U.S. Nuclear Regulatory Commission and president of Rensselaer Polytechnic Institute.

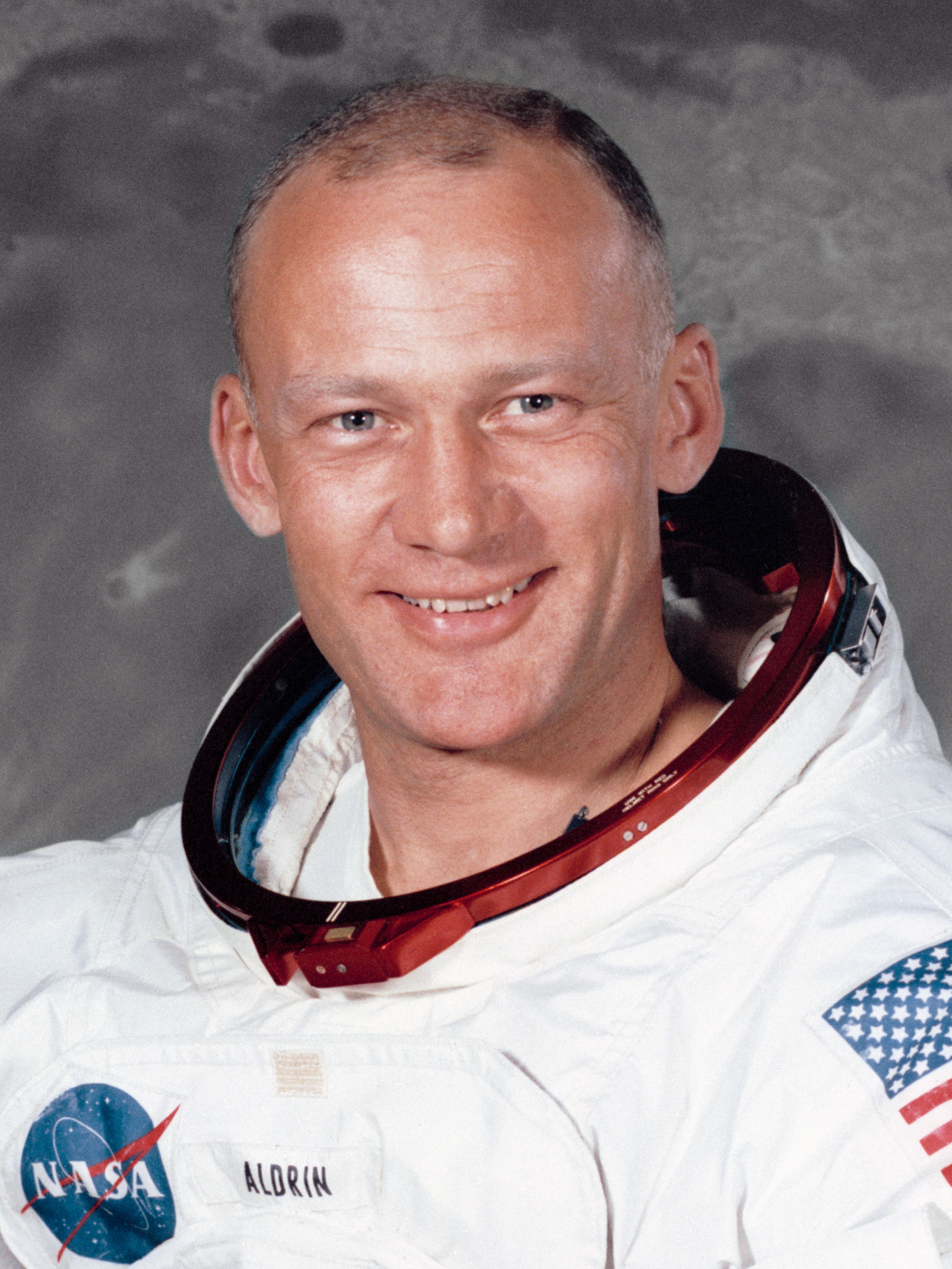
Apollo 11 astronaut Buzz Aldrin, ScD 1963

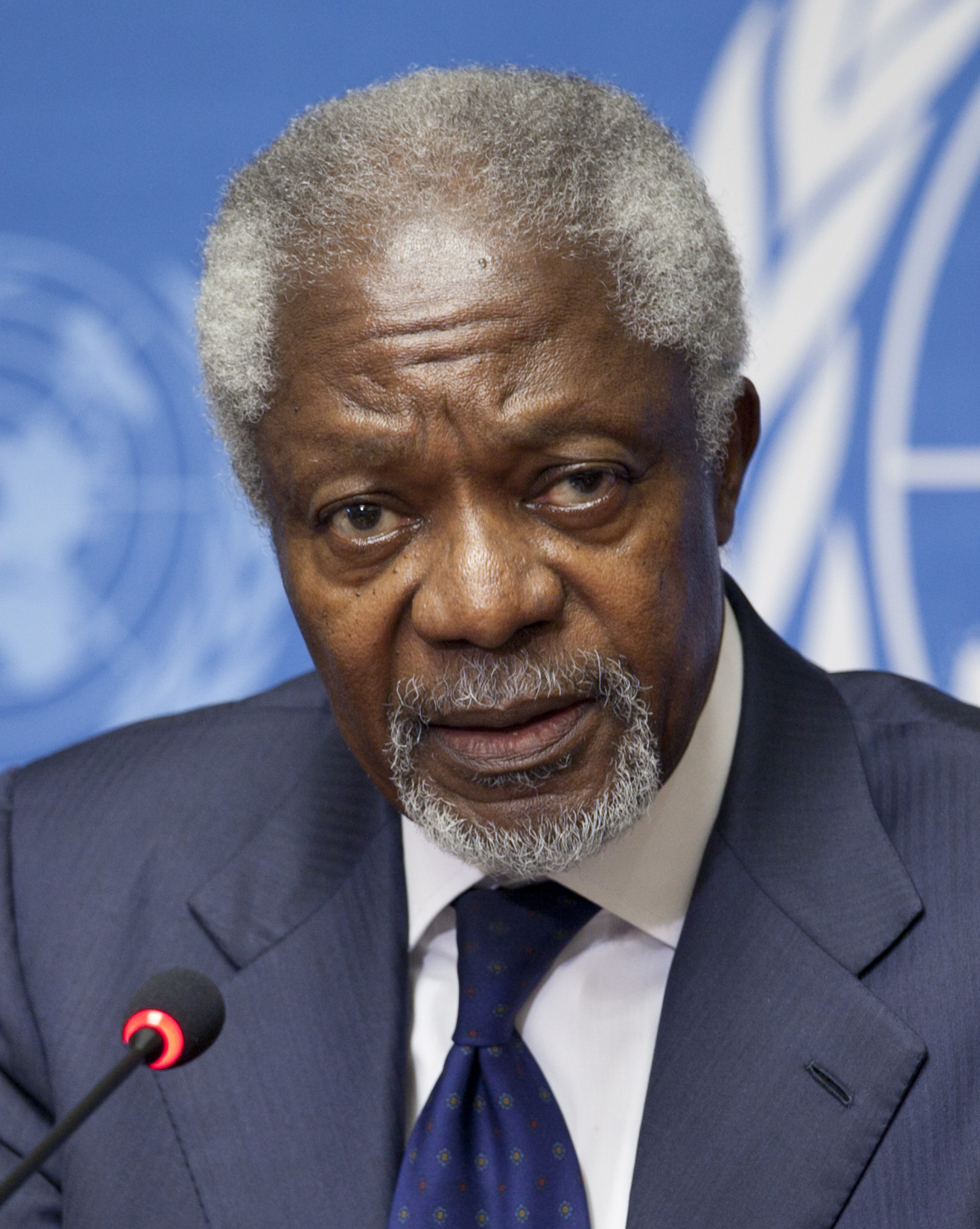
UN Secretary-General Kofi Annan, SM 1972

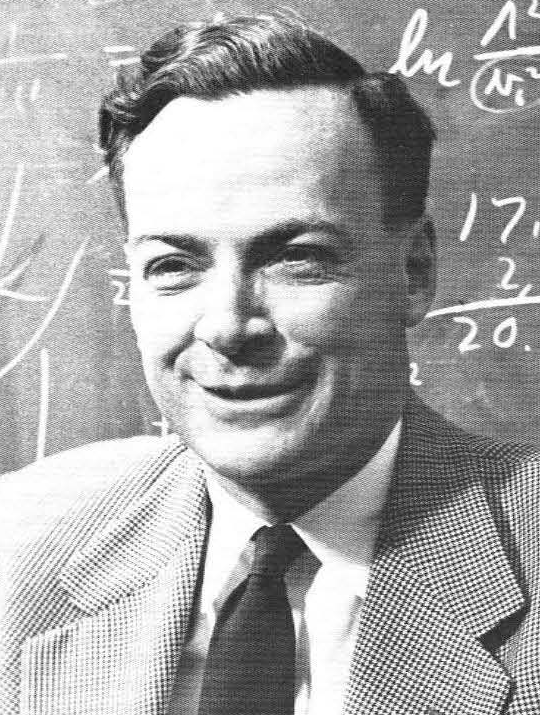
Physics Nobel laureate Richard Feynman, SB 1939

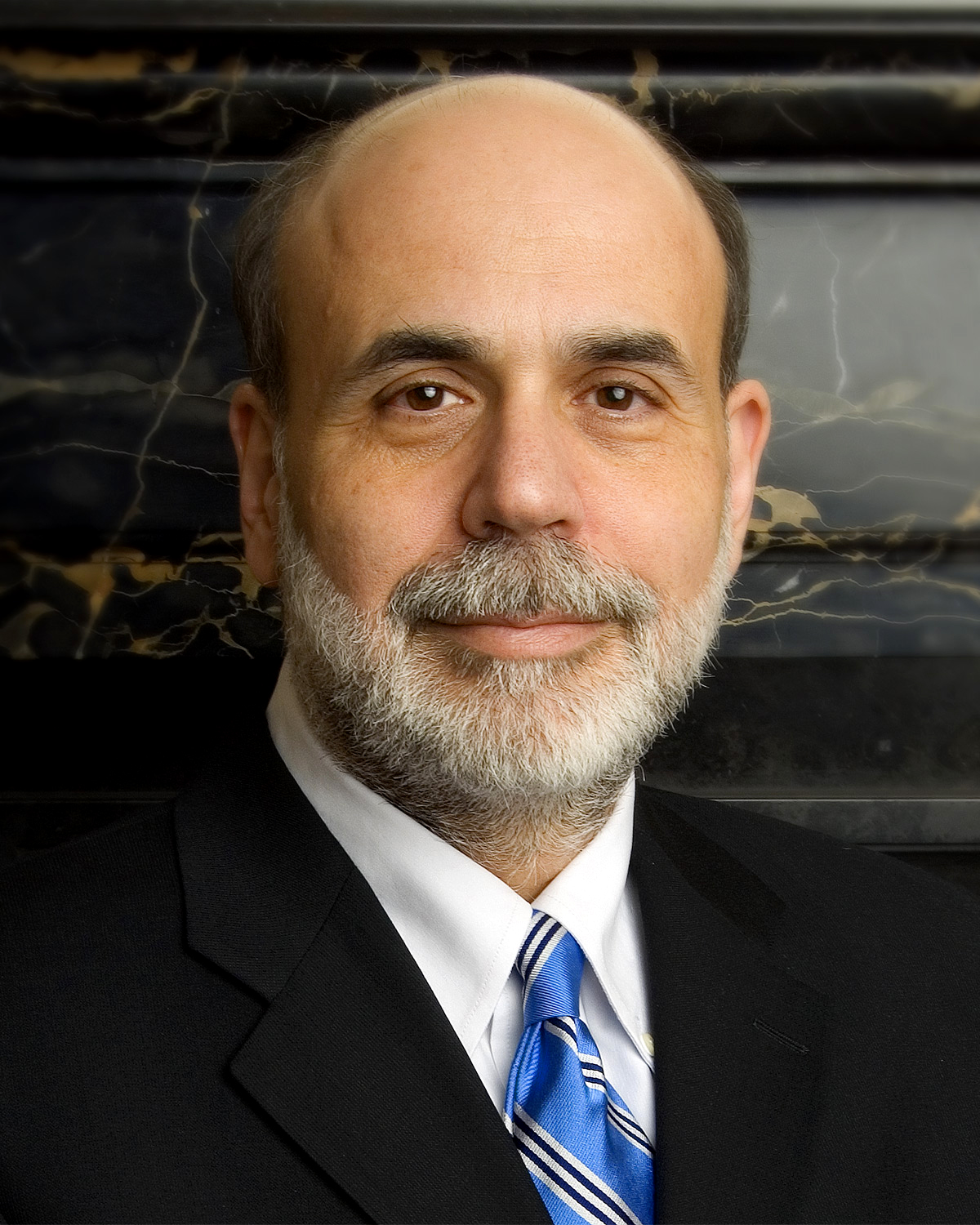
Federal Reserve Bank chairman Ben Bernanke, PhD 1979

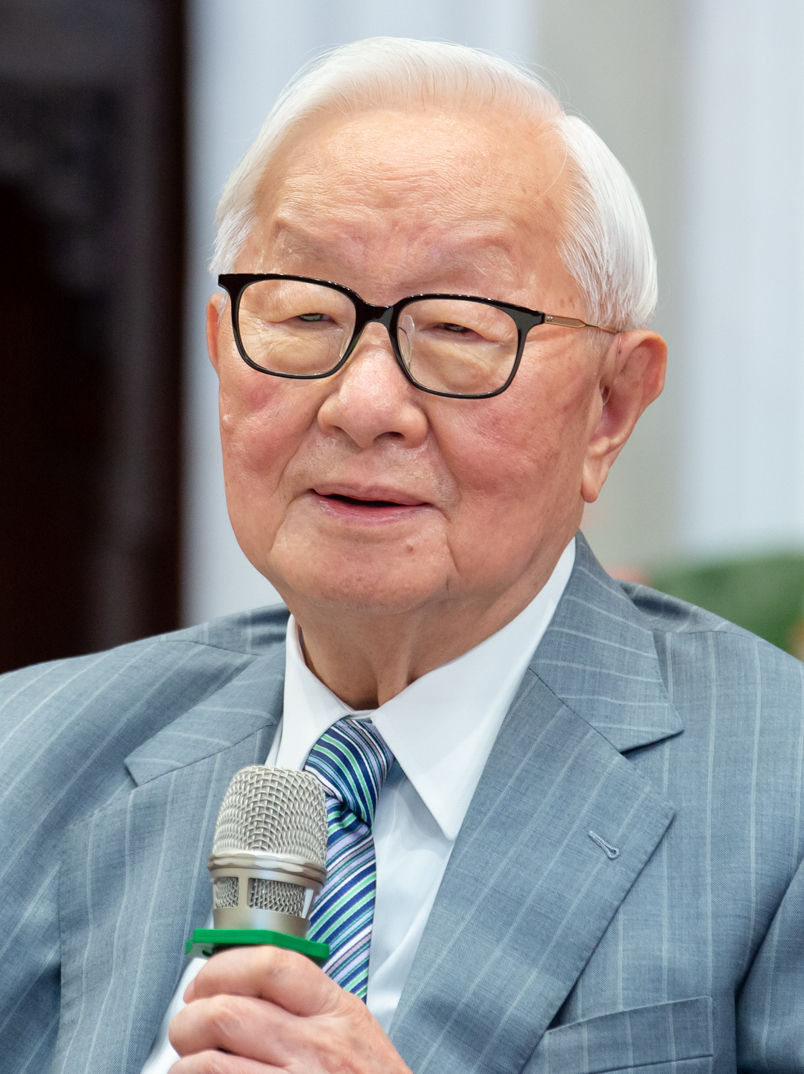
TSMC chairman Morris Chang, BS 1952, ME 1955

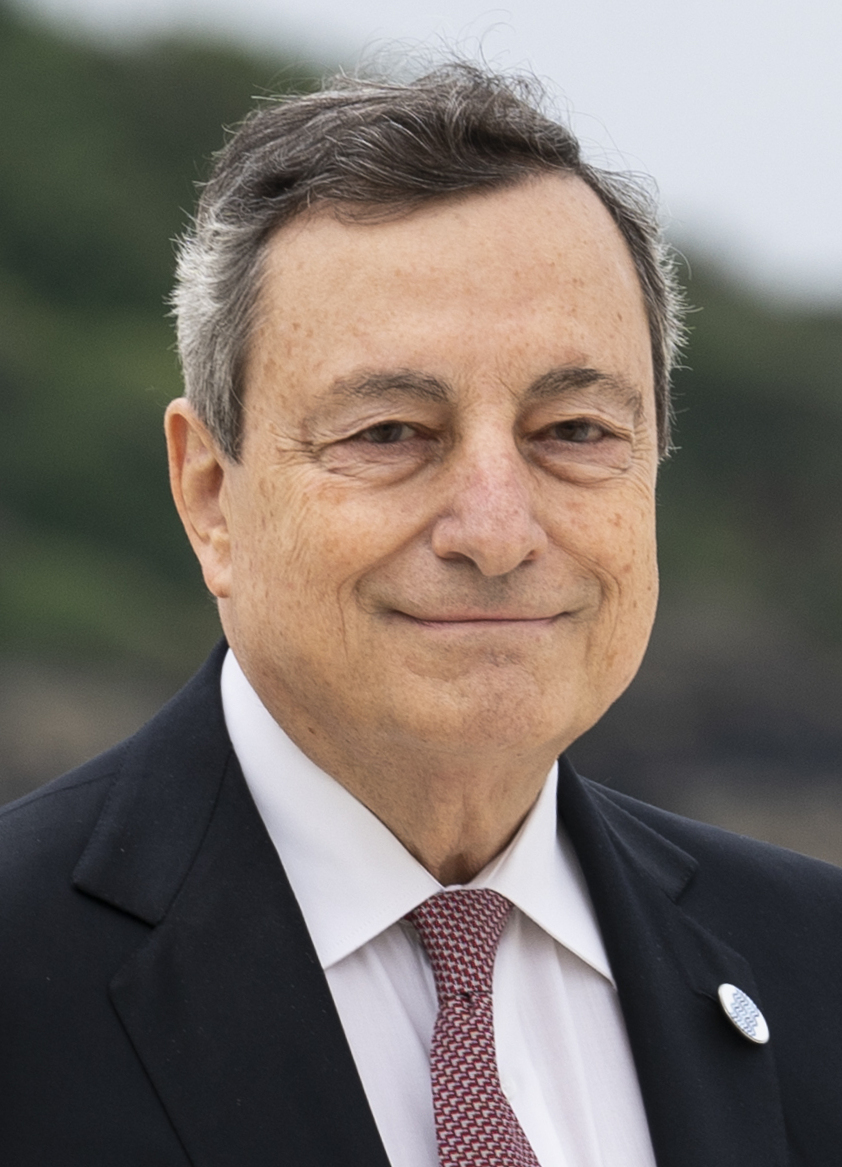
Prime Minister of Italy Mario Draghi, PhD 1977

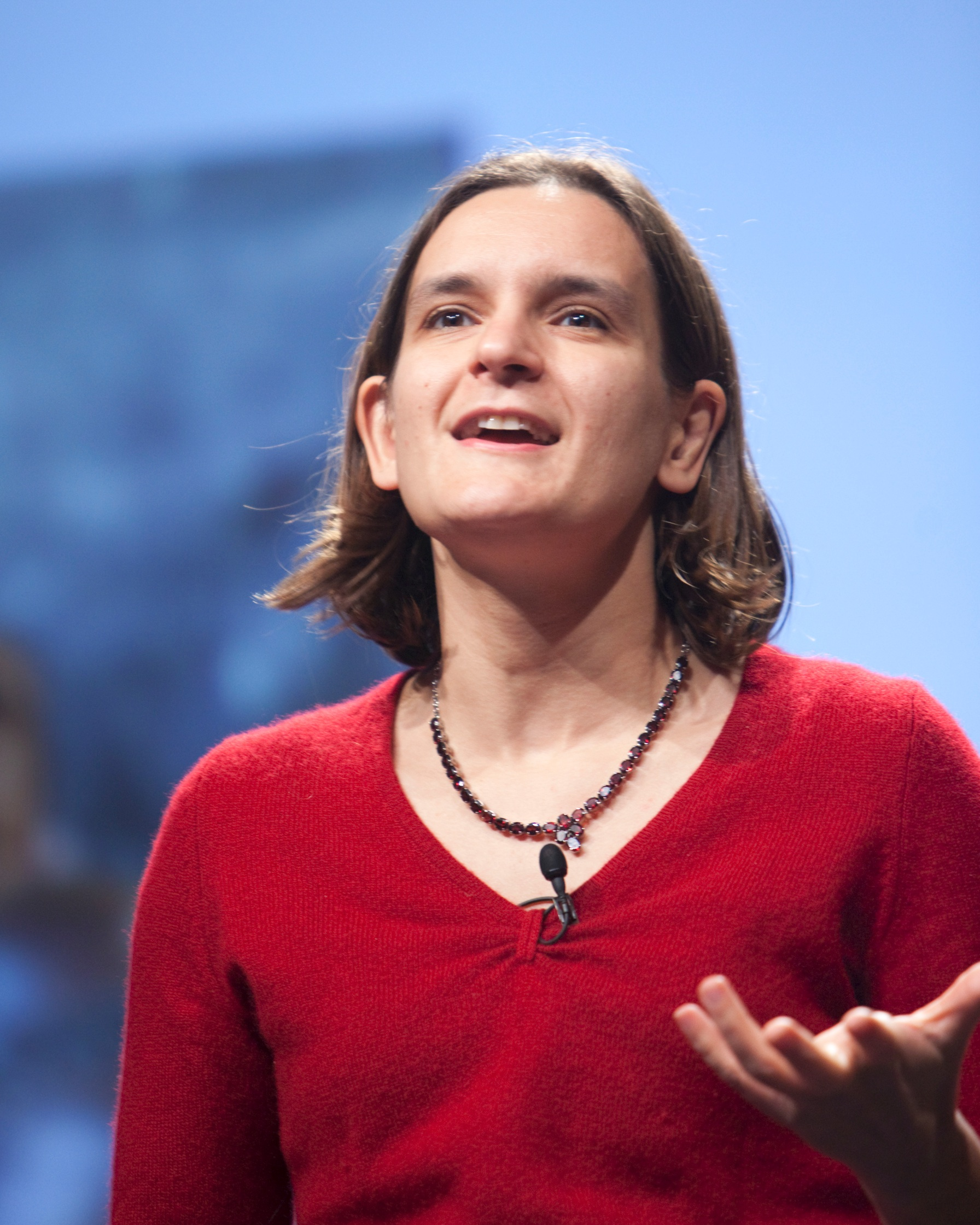
Economics Nobel laureate Esther Duflo, PhD 1999

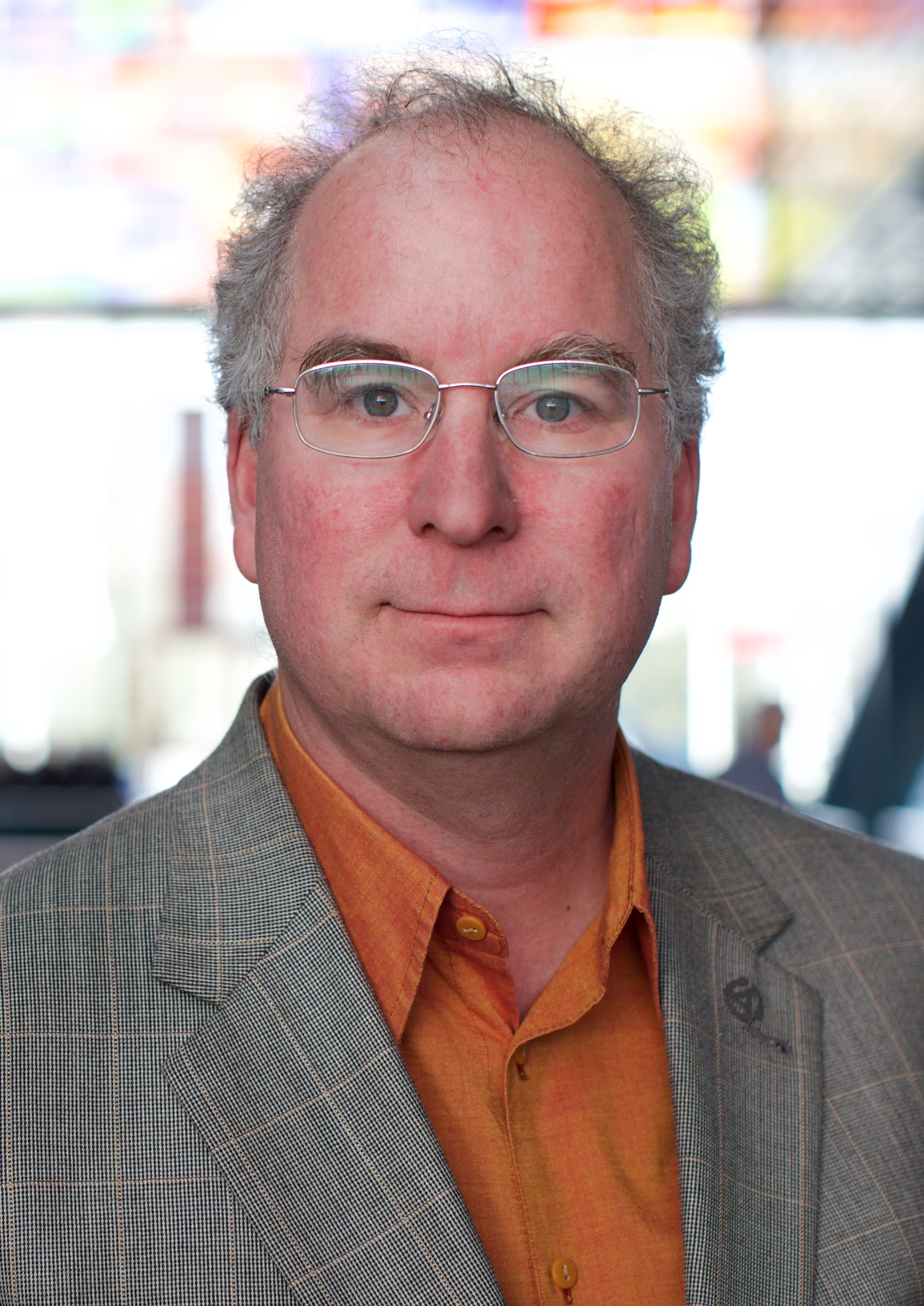
Internet Archive founder Brewster Kahle, SB 1982

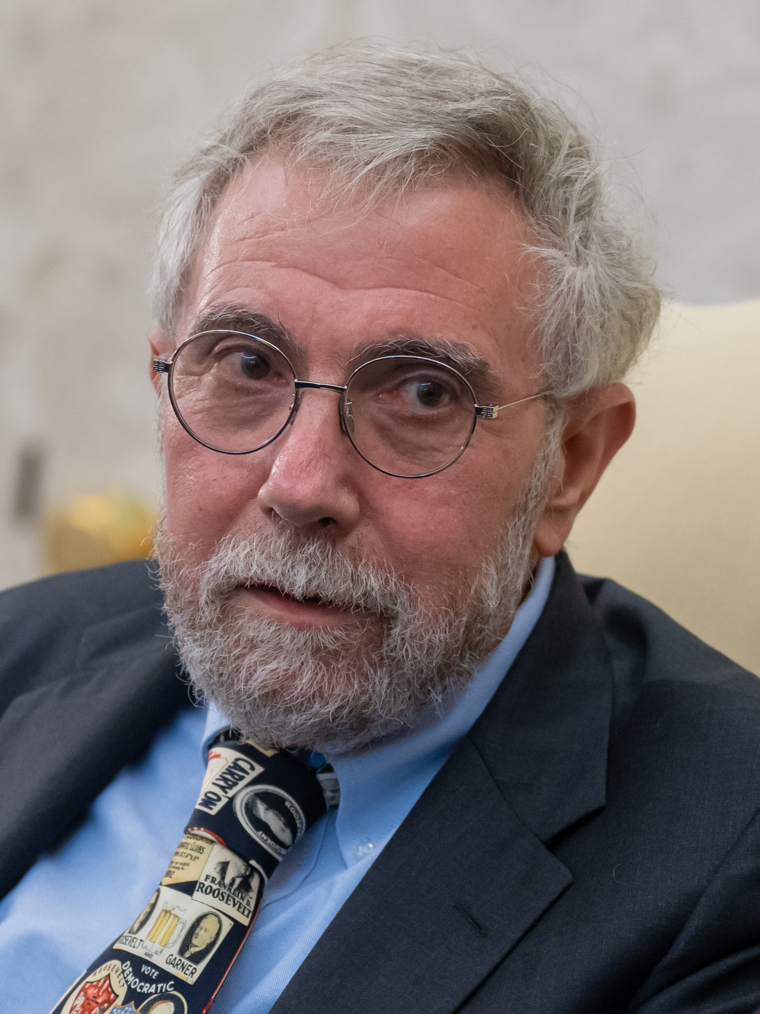
Economics Nobel laureate Paul Krugman, PhD 1977

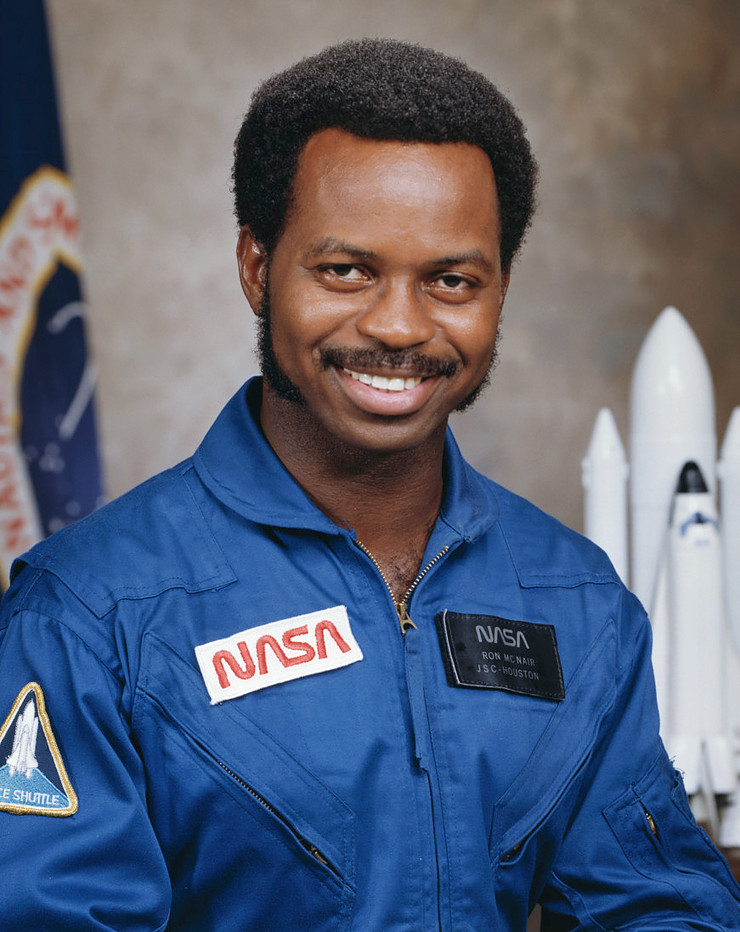
Challenger astronaut Ronald McNair, PhD 1976

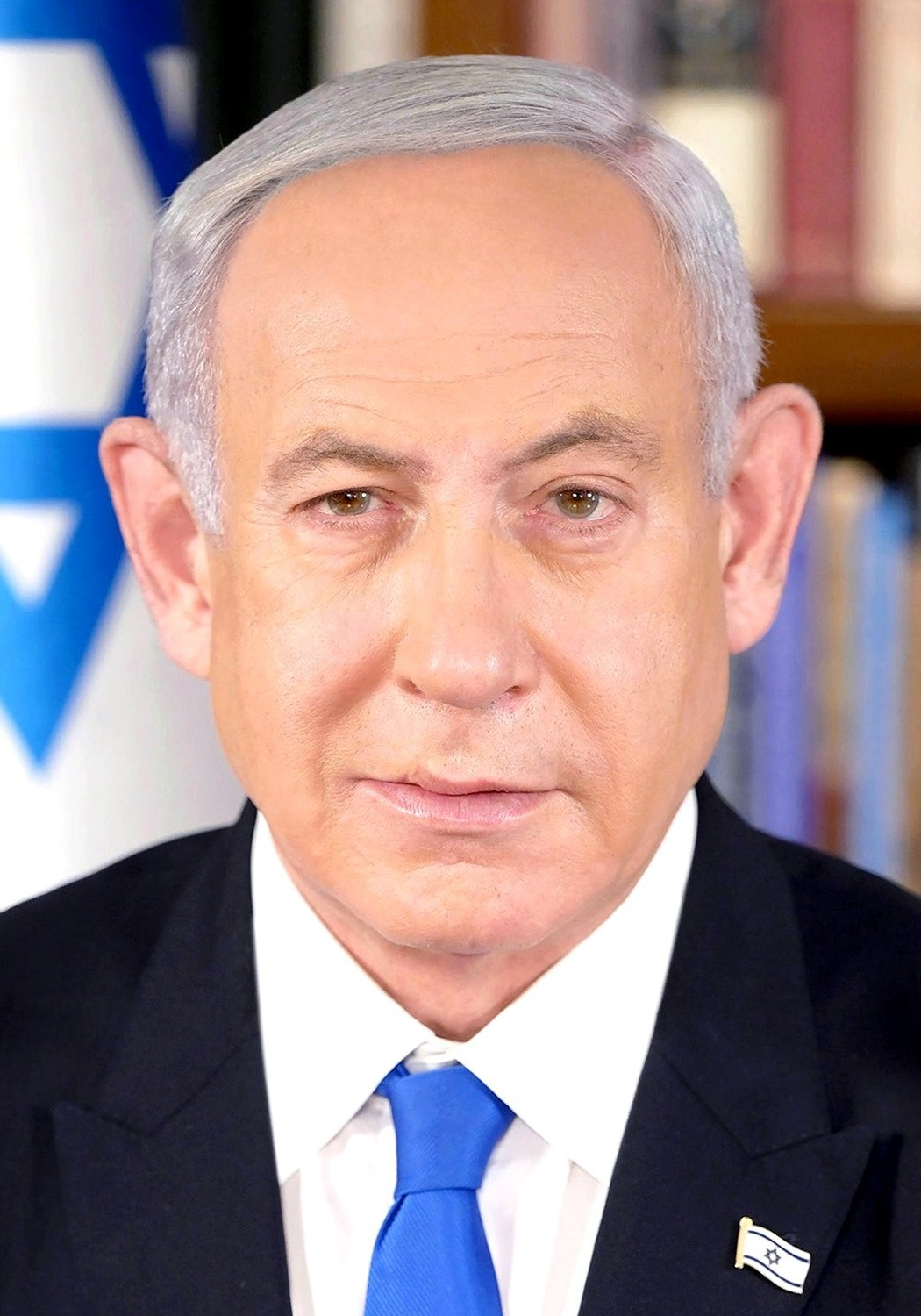
Prime Minister of Israel Benjamin Netanyahu, BS 1975, MS 1976

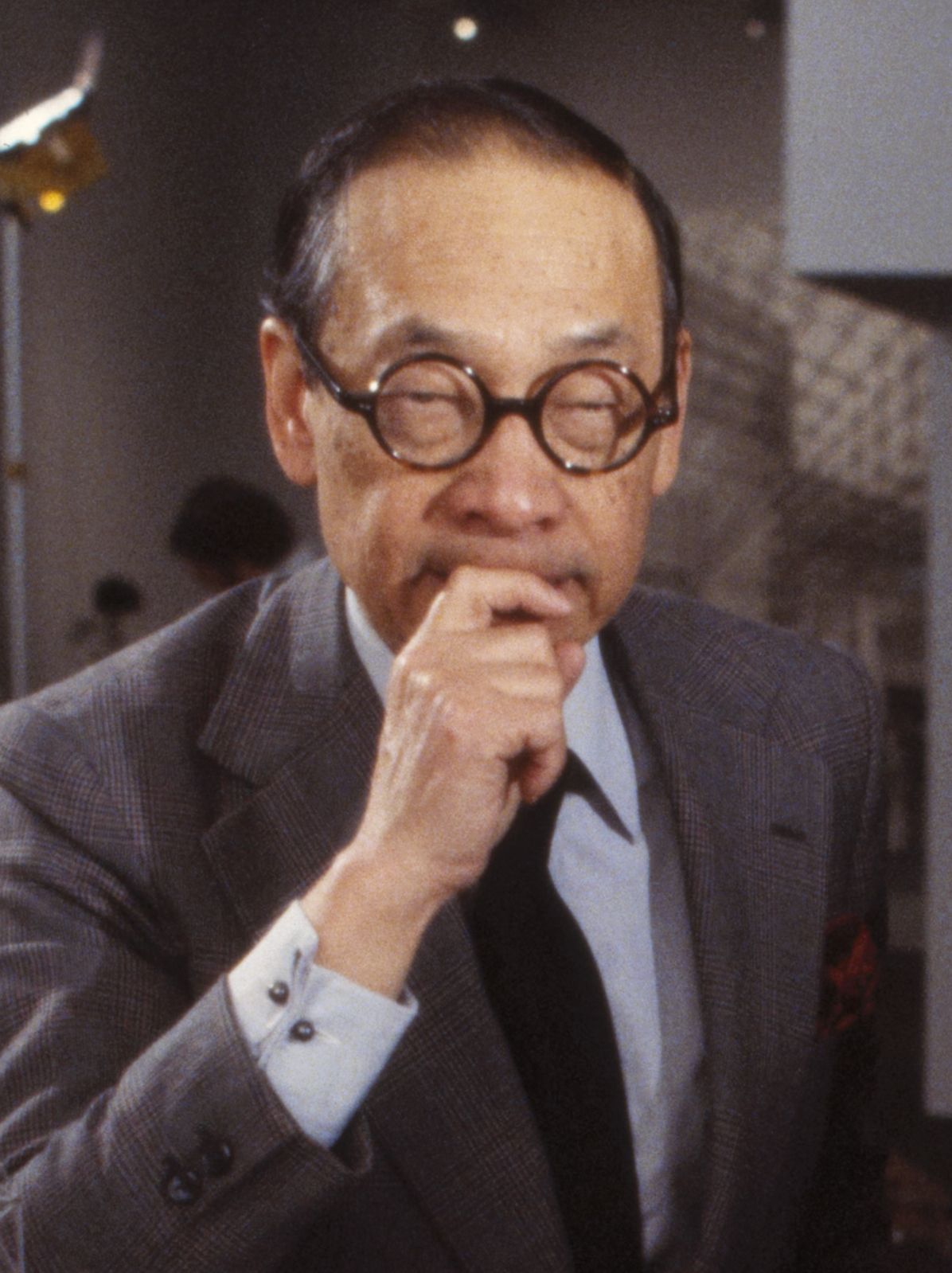
Architect I. M. Pei, BArch 1940

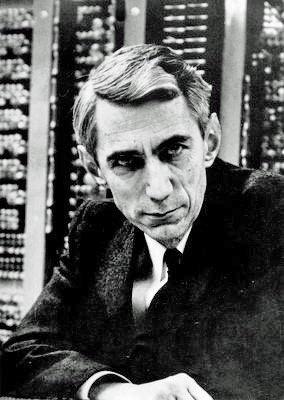
Information theorist Claude Shannon, PhD 1940

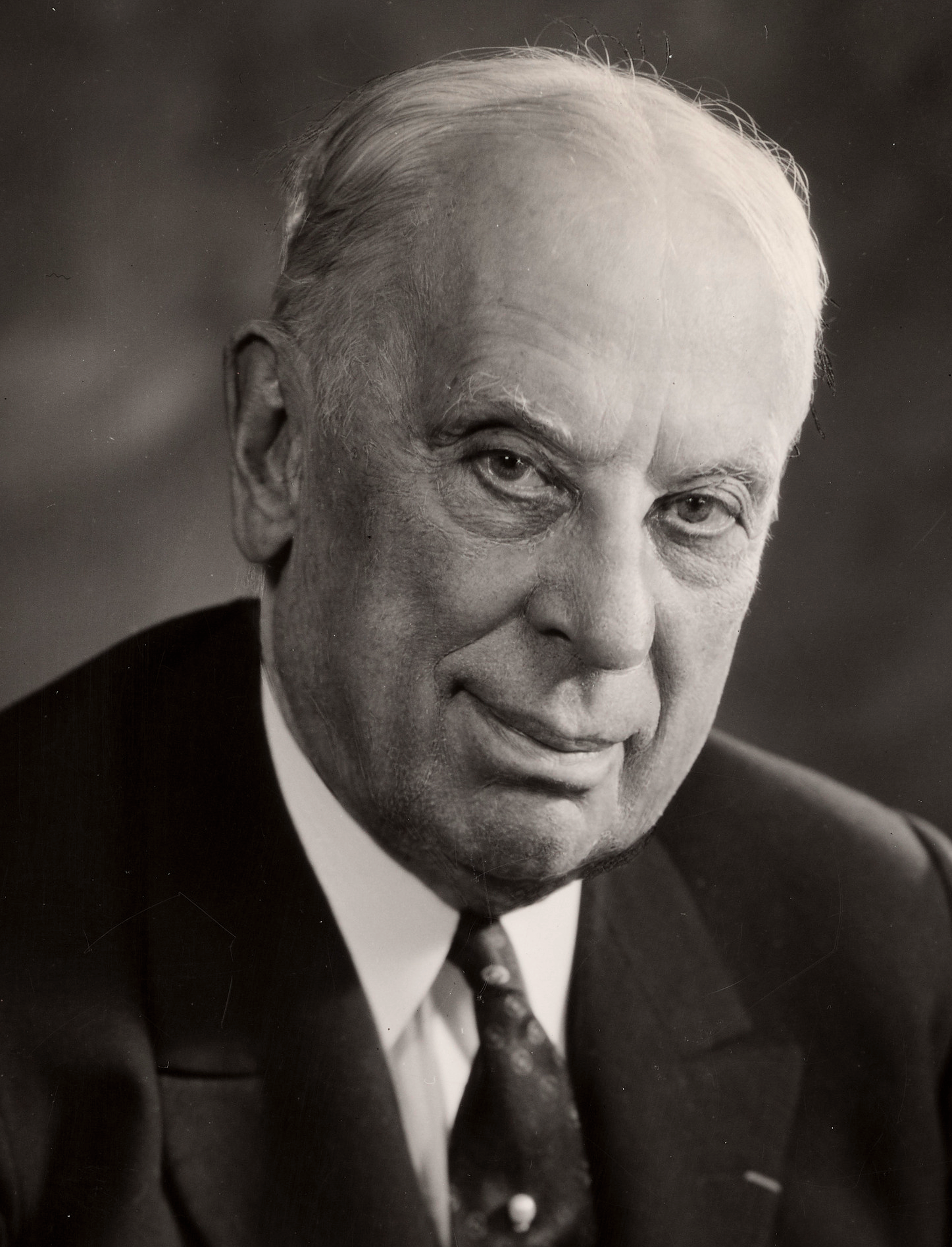
General Motors CEO Alfred P. Sloan, SB 1895

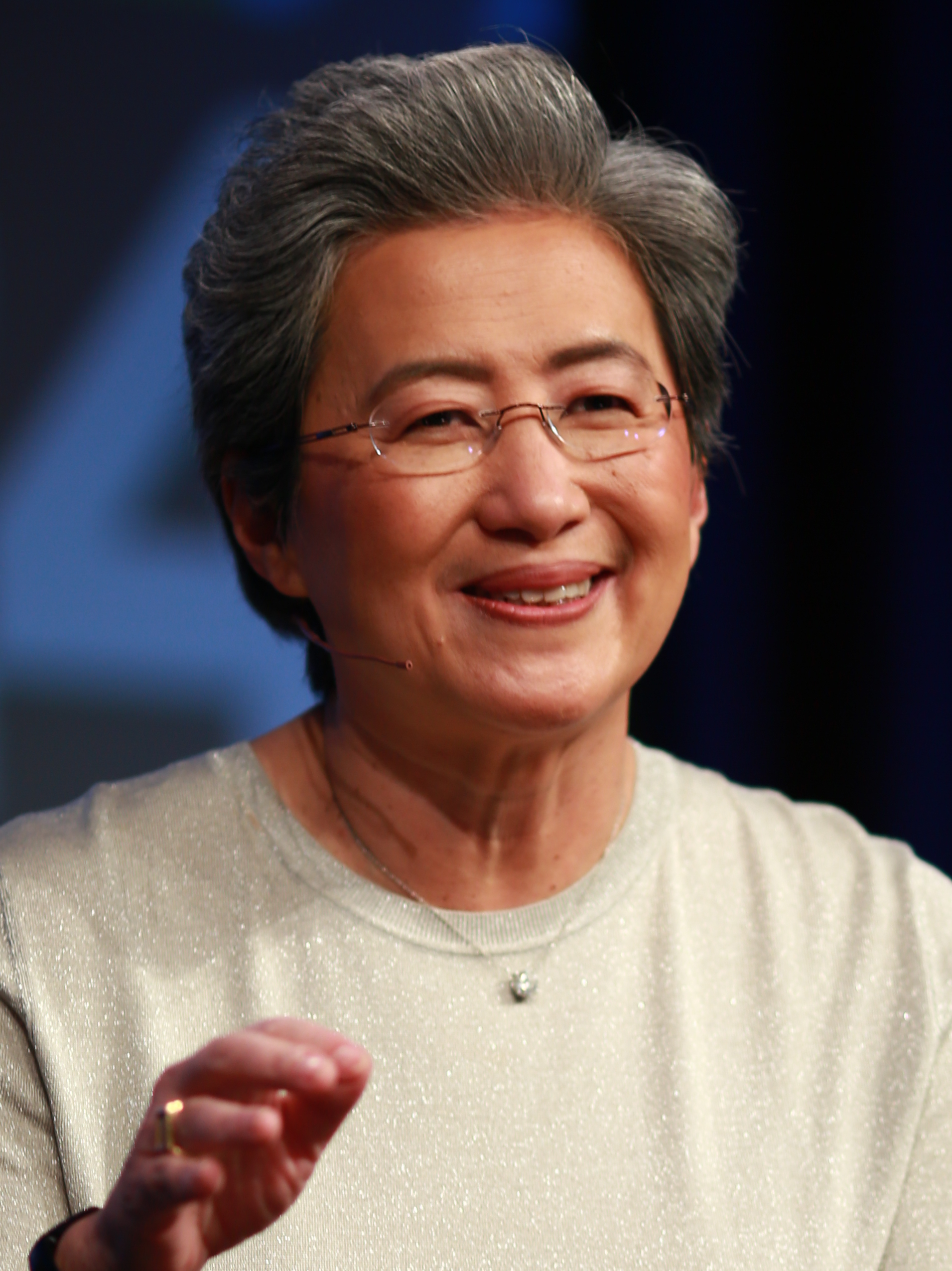
AMD CEO Lisa Su, SB 1990, PhD 1994

Chemistry Nobel laureate Robert Burns Woodward, SB 1936, PhD 1937

== See also ==
- Massachusetts Institute of Technology School of Engineering
- Whitehead Institute
- Eli and Edythe L. Broad Institute of MIT and Harvard
- Koch Institute for Integrative Cancer Research
- The Coop, campus bookstore
