= History of the Massachusetts Institute of Technology =

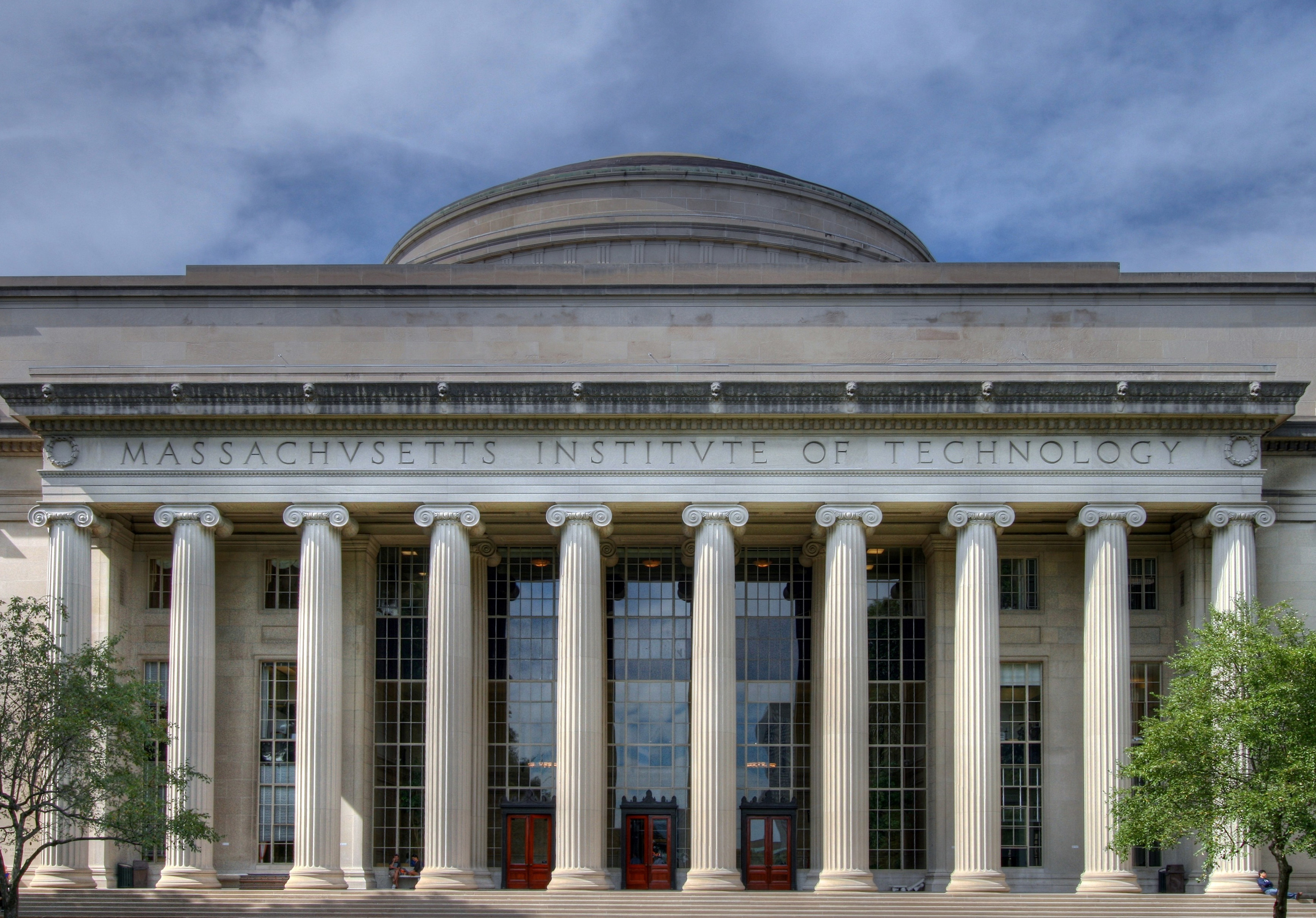
MIT's Building 10 and Great Dome overlooking Killian Court

The history of the Massachusetts Institute of Technology can be traced back to the 1861 incorporation of the "Massachusetts Institute of Technology and Boston Society of Natural History" led primarily by William Barton Rogers.

== Vision and mission ==
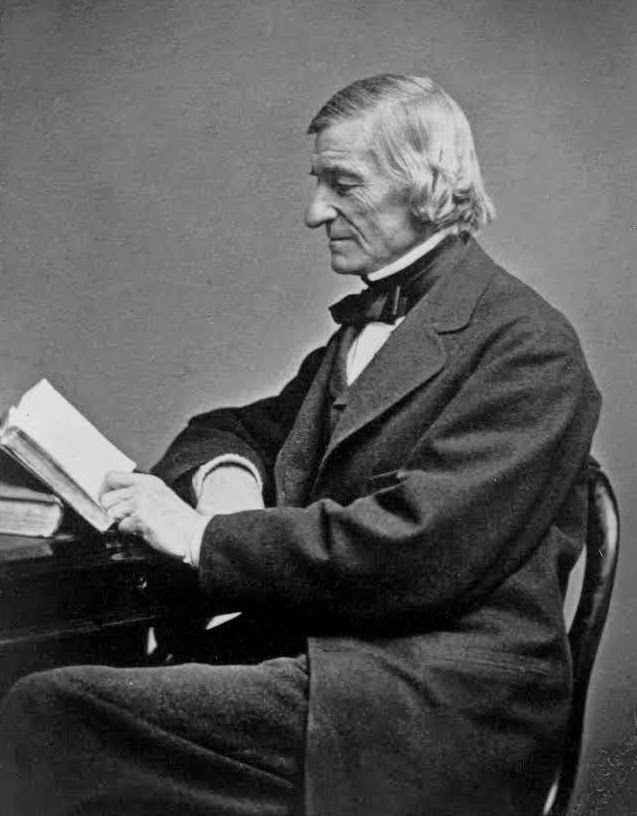
William Barton Rogers

As early as 1859, the Massachusetts State Legislature was given a proposal for use of newly opened lands in Back Bay in Boston for a museum and Conservatory of Art and Science.

On April 10, 1861, the governor of the Commonwealth of Massachusetts signed a charter for the incorporation of the "Massachusetts Institute of Technology and Boston Society of Natural History" which had been submitted by William Barton Rogers, a natural scientist. Rogers sought to establish a new form of higher education to address the challenges posed by rapid advances in science and technology in the mid-19th century, that he believed classic institutions were ill-prepared to deal with.

With the charter approved, Rogers began raising funds, developing a curriculum and looking for a suitable location. The Rogers Plan, as it came to be known, was rooted in three principles: the educational value of useful knowledge, the necessity of "learning by doing", and integrating a professional and liberal arts education at the undergraduate level. MIT was a pioneer in the use of laboratory instruction. Its founding philosophy is "the teaching, not of the manipulations and minute details of the arts, which can be done only in the workshop, but the inculcation of all the scientific principles which form the basis and explanation of them".

Because open conflict in the Civil War broke out only two days later on April 12, 1861, Rogers faced enormous difficulties raising funds to match conditional financial commitments from the state. Thus, his recruitment of faculty and students was delayed, but eventually MIT's first classes were held in rented space at the Mercantile Building in downtown Boston in 1865.

== Boston Tech (1865–1916) ==
Includes the administrations of William Barton Rogers (1862–1870, 1879–1881), John Daniel Runkle (1870–1879), Francis Amasa Walker (1881–1896), and Henry Pritchett (1900–1907)

Construction of the first MIT building was completed in Boston's Back Bay in 1866 and would be known as "Boston Tech" until the campus moved across the Charles River to Cambridge in 1916.

At the Philadelphia Centennial Exhibition of 1875, Runkle was impressed by the work of the Russian Victor Della-Vos, who had introduced a pedagogical approach combining manual and theoretical instruction at the Moscow Imperial Technical Academy. Runkle became an advocate of this approach, introducing it at MIT.

MIT's financial position was severely undermined following the Panic of 1873 and subsequent Long Depression. Enrollments decreased sharply after 1875 and by 1878, the university had abolished three professorships, reduced faculty salaries, and there was talk among members of the Corporation of closing the Institute. In 1879, Runkle retired from a nine-year tenure as the MIT's second president trying to weather these challenges, but the board of trustees (the "MIT Corporation") was unable to secure a new successor and elected the seventy-five-year-old founder William Barton Rogers back to the post in the interim under his stipulated conditions that he be allowed to resign upon the discovery of a successor and $100,000 ($2,303,000 in 2009) be raised to fund the Institute's obligations.

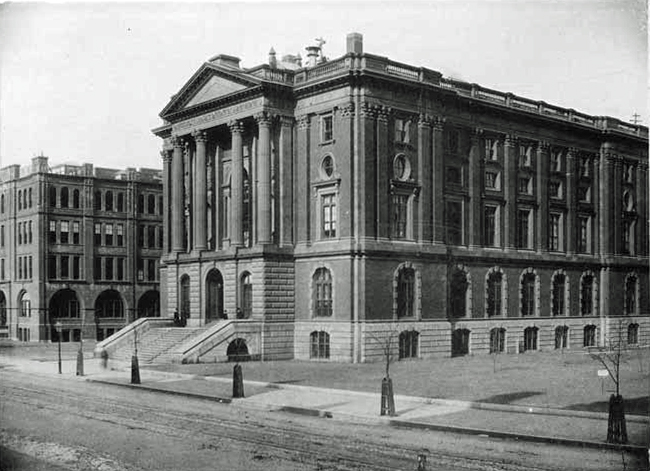
An 1889 photogravure of the 1865 "Rogers" Building in the foreground with the 1883 "Walker" Building in the background

Rogers wrote Francis Amasa Walker in June 1880 to offer him the Presidency. Because no alumni of MIT were of sufficient age to fill the position, most scientific leaders lacked executive experience, and few leaders shared the founder's, faculty's, or Corporation's vision for the young technical institute, Walker's previous experience and reputation made him uniquely qualified for the position. Walker ultimately accepted in early May and was formally elected President by the MIT Corporation on May 25, 1881; however, the assassination attempt on President Garfield in July 1881 and the ensuing illness before Garfield's death in September upset Walker's transition and delayed his formal introduction to the faculty of MIT until November 5, 1881. On May 30, 1882, during Walker's first Commencement exercises, Rogers died mid-speech where his last words were famously "bituminous coal".

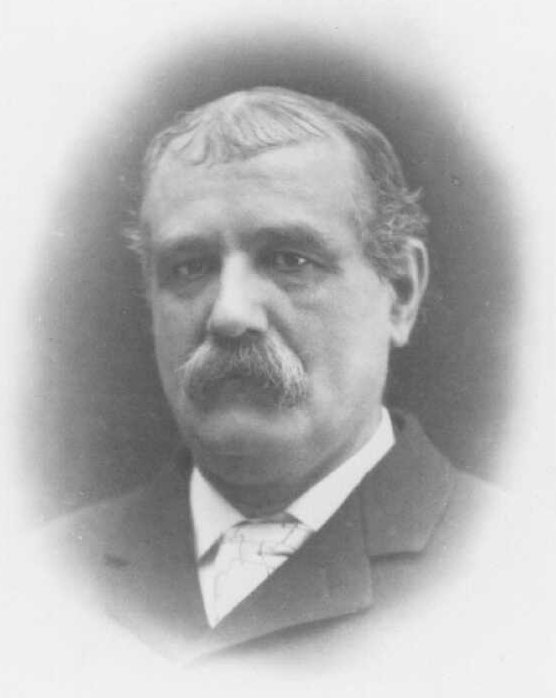
Francis Amasa Walker as President of MIT

Walker established a new general course of study (Course IX) emphasizing economics, history, law, English, and modern languages. Walker also set out to reform and expand the Institute's organization by creating an Executive Committee, apart from the fifty-member Corporation, to handle regular administrative issues. He also emphasized the importance of faculty governance by regularly attending their meetings and seeking their advice on major decisions.

MIT's inability to secure a more stable financial footing during this era can largely be attributed to the existence of the Lawrence Scientific School at nearby Harvard. Given the choice between funding technological research at the oldest university in the nation or an independent and adolescent institution, potential benefactors were indifferent or even hostile to funding MIT's competing mission. Earlier overtures from founding MIT faculty member and now Harvard President Charles William Eliot towards consolidation of the two schools had been rejected or disrupted by Rogers in 1870 and 1878. Also, despite his previous tenure at the analogous Sheffield School, Walker now remained committed to MIT's independence from the larger institution.

In light of the difficulties in raising capital for these expansions and despite MIT's privately endowed status, Walker and other members of the Corporation lobbied the Massachusetts legislature for a $200,000 grant to aid in the industrial development of the Commonwealth. After intensive negotiations that called upon his extensive connections and civic experience, in 1887 the legislature made a grant of $300,000 over two years to the Institute, and would lead to a total of $1.6 million in grants from the Commonwealth to the Institute before the practice was abolished in 1921.

Walker sought to erect a new building on to address the increasingly cramped conditions of the original Boylston Street campus located near Copley Square. Because the stipulations of the original land grant prevented MIT from covering more than two-ninths of its current lot, Walker announced his intention to build the industrial expansion on a lot directly across from the Trinity Church fully intending that their opposition would lead to favorable terms for selling the proposed land and funding construction elsewhere. With the financial health of the Institute only beginning to recover, Walker began construction on the partially funded expansion fully expecting the immediacy of the project to be a persuasive tool for raising its funds. The strategy was only partially successful as the 1883 building had laboratory facilities that were second-to-none but also lacked the outward architectural grandeur of its sister building and was generally considered an eyesore on its surroundings. Mechanical shops were moved out of the Rogers Building in the mid-1880s to accommodate other programs and in 1892 the Institute began construction on another Copley Square building. New programs were also launched under Walker's tenure: Electrical Engineering in 1882, Chemical Engineering in 1888, Sanitary Engineering in 1889, Geology in 1890, Naval Architecture in 1893.

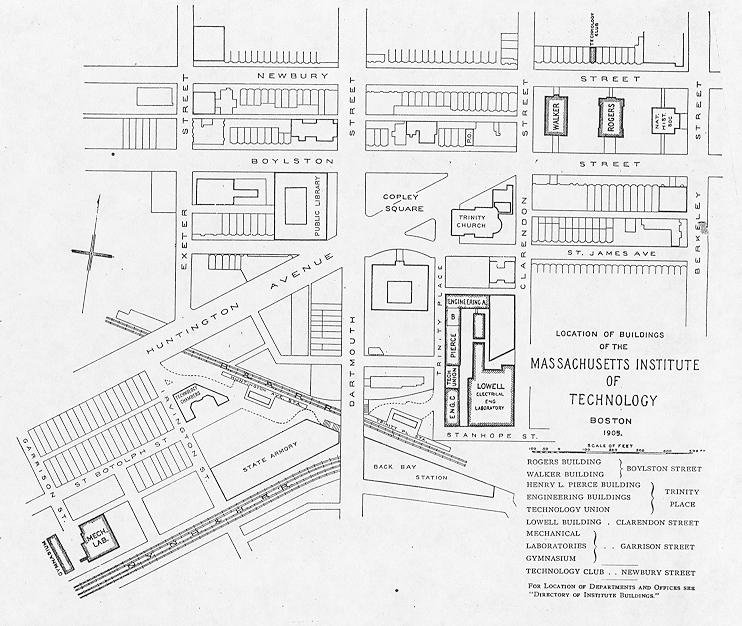
A 1905 map of MIT's Boston campus

Walker also sought to improve the state of student life and alumni relations by supporting the creation of a gymnasium, dormitories, and the Technology Club which served to foster a stronger identity and loyalty among the largely commuter student body. Walker also won considerable praise from the student body by reducing the required time spent in recitation and preparation, limited the faculty to examinations lasting no longer than three hours, expanded the availability of entrance examinations in other cities, started a summer curriculum, and launched masters and doctoral graduate degree programs. These reforms were largely a response to Walker's on-going defense of the Institute and its curriculum from outside accusations of overwork, poor writing, unapplicable skills, and status as a "mere" trade school. Between 1881 and 1897, enrollments quadrupled from 302 to 1,198 students, annual degrees granted increased from 28 to 179, faculty appointments quadrupled from 38 to 156, and the endowment grew thirteen-fold from $137,000 to $1,798,000.

In the following years, the science and engineering curriculum drifted away from Rogers' ideal of combining general and professional studies and became focused on more vocational or practical and less theoretical concerns. To the extent that MIT had overspecialized to the detriment of other programs, "the school up the river" courted MIT's administration with hopes of merging the schools. An initial proposal in 1900 was cancelled after protests from MIT's alumni. In 1914, a merger of MIT and Harvard's Applied Science departments was formally announced and was to begin "when the Institute will occupy its splendid new buildings in Cambridge". However, in 1917, the arrangement with Harvard was cancelled due to a decision by the State Judicial Court. Since the founding years, there had been at least six failed attempts to absorb MIT into Harvard.

MIT was the first university in the nation to have a curriculum in: architecture (1865), electrical engineering (1882), sanitary engineering (1889), naval architecture and marine engineering (1895), aeronautical engineering (1914), meteorology (1928), nuclear physics (1935), and artificial intelligence (1960s).

== World War I and after (1917–1939) ==
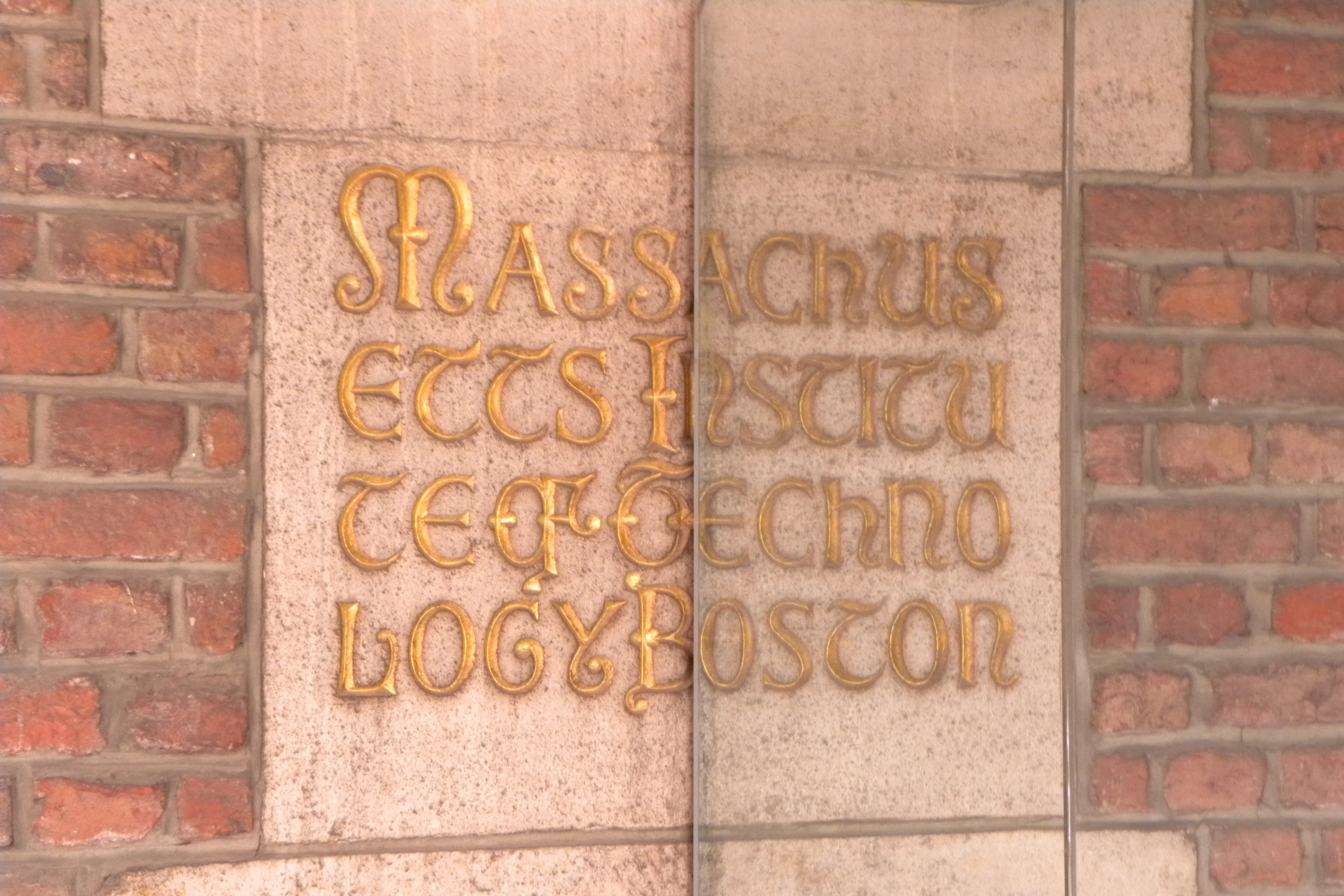
This engraved stone in the facade of the Louvain (Belgium) university library commemorates financial support received from MIT (among many others) to rebuild the collection after its destruction by fire in 1914.

A pilot training program was necessary as the United States Navy prepared for the emerging technology of naval aviation for World War I. Following the United States declaration of war on 6 April 1917, the Navy implemented a three-part pilot training program beginning with two months of ground school, followed by preliminary flight training teaching student pilots to fly solo, and advanced flight training to qualification as a naval aviator with a commission in the Naval Reserve Flying Corps.

Commander Jerome Clarke Hunsaker, who had previously studied and then taught at the MIT School of Aeronautical Engineering, encouraged the Secretary of the Navy to establish the Navy's first ground school for pilot training at MIT. The first class of fifty student pilots arrived on 23 July 1917 for an eight-week training program covering electricity, signals, photography, seamanship, navigation, gunnery, aeronautic engines, theory of flight, and aircraft instruments. MIT provided training and quarters, exclusive of beds and bedding, at a cost per student of ten dollars per week for the first four weeks, and five dollars for succeeding weeks. New classes arrived at intervals of two weeks. The last of 34 classes graduated on 18 January 1919. Of 4,911 students enrolling in the ground school, 3,622 graduated qualified for preliminary flight training.

The MIT ground school provided the model for similar ground school programs opened in July 1918 at the University of Washington in Seattle, and at Dunwoody Institute in Minneapolis. The naval aviation training program at MIT was expanded to include an aerography school training 54 weather forecasters, and an inspector's school training 114 airplane inspectors and 58 engine inspectors to oversee quality control of newly manufactured aviation material.

== World War II and Cold War (1940–1966) ==
Includes the administrations of James R. Killian (1948-1959) and Julius A. Stratton (1959-1966)

=== Prewar background and wartime mobilization ===
Before the Second World War, MIT had already begun to shift from a practice-oriented engineering school toward a science-based research university under President Karl Taylor Compton (1930–1948), who strengthened the science departments, reoriented the curriculum, and expanded graduate programs. The Institute's Division of Industrial Cooperation, founded in the 1920s, gave it two decades of experience administering externally sponsored research contracts — an unusual capability among American universities at the time.

In June 1940, Vannevar Bush—an MIT professor and former vice president who had become chairman of the new National Defense Research Committee—helped arrange for MIT to host a major laboratory for microwave radar research. The British had recently invented the resonant-cavity magnetron, which promised to transform radar from a crude warning system into a precise tool for detecting aircraft and ships. After other proposed sites fell through, Bush and the NDRC's Microwave Committee turned to Compton, who agreed to house the project. The resulting MIT Radiation Laboratory—named to conceal its true purpose—opened in late 1940 with a staff of about fifty and a budget of $455,000. That initial contract was the first large wartime research contract between the federal government and a university, and the terms negotiated by the Division of Industrial Cooperation became a model for subsequent government–university agreements.

The Rad Lab grew rapidly. At its peak it employed roughly 4,000 people, including some 1,200 civilian scientists and engineers, and occupied 15 acres of floor space in Cambridge, with branch operations in England and the Pacific theatre. NDRC Division 14, under which the lab was organized, expended approximately $1.5 billion for radar systems — a scale comparable to the Manhattan Project's $2 billion for the atomic bomb. Although MIT provided the administrative home, the laboratory's scientific leadership was largely drawn from other universities: physicist Lee DuBridge of Rochester served as director, with I. I. Rabi of Columbia and Wheeler Loomis of Illinois as associate directors.

The Radiation Laboratory dominated MIT's wartime profile, but it was not the Institute's only major contribution. Charles Stark Draper's Confidential Instruments Development Laboratory, working with the Sperry Gyroscope Company, developed gyroscopic lead-computing gunsights for the Navy; the Mark 14 sight alone was manufactured in some 85,000 units and is credited in naval battle reports with more antiaircraft kills than all other fire-control directors combined. Gordon Brown's Servomechanisms Laboratory advanced feedback-control systems, and dozens of smaller projects across the Institute addressed problems ranging from submarine detection to chemical warfare and flight instrumentation. By war's end MIT had received some $117 million in research and development contracts, far exceeding the $17 million awarded to Western Electric (AT&T's manufacturing arm), the top industrial R&D contractor. About 90 percent of all OSRD funds spent at universities went to just eight institutions, with roughly a third going to the Rad Lab alone.

=== Postwar laboratories ===
The closure of the Radiation Laboratory in 1945 did not end large-scale military-funded research at MIT. Instead, a set of new interdepartmental laboratories emerged from the wartime infrastructure and became the institutional core of the postwar Institute. The Research Laboratory of Electronics (RLE), founded in 1946, inherited the Rad Lab's facilities, equipment, and a broad mandate to study phenomena associated with microwave radiation. Its funding came through a joint-services contract from the Office of Naval Research, the Air Force, and the Army Signal Corps, which provided initial annual support of $600,000 with unusual latitude: the director could allocate the money as he saw fit for basic research and graduate education. RLE quickly became what its director Jerome Wiesner later called "an almost ideal research environment." By the early 1960s it had trained some 300 doctoral, 600 master's, and 600 bachelor's degree students, and its alumni included two future MIT presidents, three directors of Lincoln Laboratory, and numerous department chairs. RLE was the first of MIT's interdepartmental laboratories, and its organizational model — cutting across traditional departmental boundaries, supported by military funds but oriented toward basic science — became the template for those that followed.

The Laboratory for Nuclear Science and Engineering (LNSE), also established in 1946, was created with Navy support to position MIT in a field where it had lagged behind Berkeley, Chicago, and Cornell during the war. (MIT had played a minor role in the Manhattan Project, and its physicists recognized the need to catch up quickly.) In 1951, at the Air Force's request, MIT created Lincoln Laboratory in Lexington, Massachusetts, as a military-funded basic research lab to build a continental air-defense radar network. The project, which became the SAGE system, grew into one of the largest Cold War defense programs. When SAGE moved from prototype to operational deployment, MIT spun off MITRE in 1958 as a nonprofit systems-engineering corporation, transferring about a third of Lincoln's professional staff.

Draper's wartime gunsight laboratory, renamed the Instrumentation Laboratory, expanded into inertial navigation and guidance systems for ballistic missiles. It designed the guidance system for the Navy's Polaris submarine-launched missile and the Air Force's Titan II ICBM, and in 1961 won the contract for the Apollo spacecraft navigation and guidance system. By the late 1960s the Instrumentation Laboratory's annual budget of roughly $54 million equalled that of all other MIT laboratories (excluding Lincoln) combined.

=== Institutional effects ===
The Institute grew dramatically through these developments. The faculty doubled and the graduate student body quintupled between the early 1930s and the mid-1950s; by the 1958–59 academic year, the ratio of graduate to undergraduate students had shifted from roughly 1:3.3 to 1:1.3. Federal funding, which had totalled $42,000 in 1939, reached nearly $38 million by 1944; after a postwar dip it grew again through the Cold War, and by 1957 research expenditures accounted for 72 percent of MIT's total operating budget. The Department of Defense was the dominant sponsor: as late as 1970, it provided 28 percent of on-campus research funding, with additional large obligations flowing to Lincoln and the Instrumentation Laboratory. MIT no longer simply served the industries with which it had worked for decades; it had developed closer and far larger working relationships with the federal government, philanthropic foundations, and a growing constellation of defense-related firms in the Route 128 corridor.

=== Lewis Report ===
Walker's Course IX on General Studies was dissolved shortly after his death and a seventy-year debate followed over what was the appropriate role and scope of humanistic and social studies at MIT. A new Department of Economics, Statistics, and Political Science was established in 1903 to replace Course IX, which was later split into a Department of Economics and Statistics and a Department of History of Political Science in 1907. Karl Taylor Compton reorganized the Institute to incorporate a Division of Humanities under which these departments were placed in 1932, but could offer no degrees. Between 1918 and 1956, political science classes and faculty were subsumed or merged into any of History and English or Economics and Social Science until a separate Ph.D. program was approved in 1958. A PhD program in Economics was launched in 1941.

The 1949 report of the Committee on Educational Survey recommended the establishment of a School of Humanities granting degrees which led to the establishment of the same in 1950 and separate departments in Economics and Political Science were formally established in 1965. Since 1975, all MIT undergraduate students have been required to take eight classes distributed across the School of Humanities, Arts, and Social Sciences before receiving their degrees.

== Social movements and activism (1966–1980) ==
Includes the administrations of Howard W. Johnson (1966–1971) and Jerome Wiesner (1971–1980)

=== Co-education ===
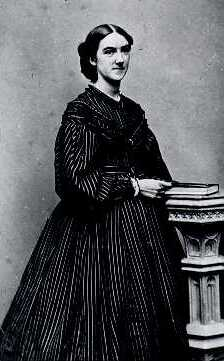
Ellen Swallow Richards (Class of 1873)

MIT has always been notionally coeducational, admitting Ellen Swallow Richards as the first female student in 1870. Female students were at first a tiny minority (numbering in the dozens) because they had no accommodations and were thus generally local residents. This changed with the completion of the first women's dormitory, McCormick Hall, in 1964. Construction was funded by Katherine Dexter McCormick, who had graduated with a biology degree and who also funded development of the birth control pill. Women constituted 45% of the undergraduates and 31% of the graduate students enrolled in 2013.

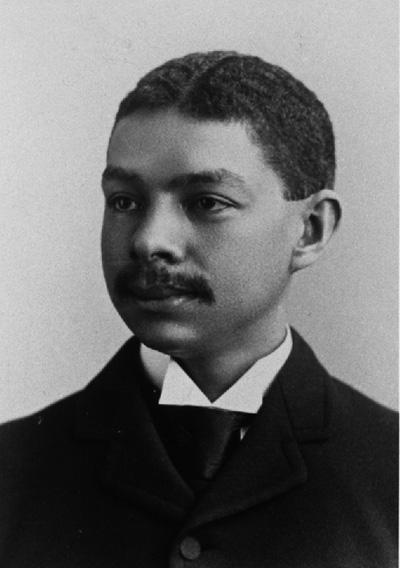
Robert Robinson Taylor (Class of 1890)

=== Anti-war protests ===
However, by the late 1960s and early 1970s, intense protests by student and faculty activists against military-related research required that the MIT administration spin these laboratories off into what would become the Charles Stark Draper Laboratory and Lincoln Laboratory. The extent of these protests is reflected by the fact that MIT had more names on "President Nixon's enemies list" than any other single organization, among them its president Jerome Wiesner and professor Noam Chomsky. Memos revealed during Watergate indicated that Nixon had ordered MIT's federal subsidy cut "in view of Wiesner's anti-defense bias."

=== Social movements ===
MIT's particular strain of anti-authoritarianism has manifested itself in other forms. In 1977, two female students, juniors Susan Gilbert and Roxanne Ritchie, were disciplined for publishing an article on April 28 of that year in the "alternative" MIT campus weekly thursday. Entitled "Consumer Guide to MIT Men," the article was a sex survey of 36 men the two claimed to have had sex with, and the men were listed with their full names and rated for their performance. Gilbert and Ritchie had intended to turn the tables on the rating systems and facebooks men use for women, but their article led not only to disciplinary action against them but also to a protest petition signed by 200 students, as well as condemnation by President Jerome B. Wiesner, who published a fierce criticism of the article. Another minor campus uproar occurred when the traditional pornographic registration-day movie was replaced by Star Wars in 1984.

=== Course "Bibles" ===
In 1970, the then-Dean of Institute Relations, Benson R. Snyder, published The Hidden Curriculum, in which he argued that a mass of unstated assumptions and requirements dominated MIT students' lives and inhibited their ability to function creatively. Snyder contended that these unwritten regulations, like the implicit curricula of informally compiled "course bibles" (problem sets and solutions from previous years' classes), often outweighed the effect of the "formal curriculum," and that the situation was not unique to MIT. After studying the behavior of MIT and Wellesley students, Snyder observed that "bibles" were often in fact counterproductive; they fooled professors into believing that their classes were imparting broad knowledge as intended, but instead locked professors and students into a feedback cycle to the detriment of actual education.

=== New programs ===
- MIT and Wellesley begin cross-registration program in 1968
- Undergraduate Research Opportunities Program (UROP) established by Margaret MacVicar in 1969
- Department of Mechanical Engineering offers 2.007 Introduction to Design, a robotics competition
- MIT-Harvard Program in Health Sciences and Technology established in 1970. Becomes Whitaker College of Health Sciences, Technology, and Management in 1977.
- Independent Activities Period (IAP) first offered in 1971
- Council for the Arts founded in 1972.
- Program in Science, Technology, and Society established in 1977.

== Changing roles and priorities (1980–2004) ==
Includes the administrations of Paul E. Gray (1980–1990) and Charles M. Vest (1990–2004)

=== Ethical disputes ===
Given the scale and reputation of MIT's research accomplishments, allegations of research misconduct or improprieties have received substantial press coverage. Professor David Baltimore, a Nobel Laureate and his colleague, Thereza Imanishi-Kari became embroiled in a research misconduct investigation starting in 1986 that led to Congressional hearings in 1991. The investigation led to him resigning from his position as president of Rockefeller University. The allegations against Imanishi-Kari were dropped, and Baltimore eventually became an endowed professor at and president of Caltech.

Professor Ted Postol has accused the MIT administration since 2000 of attempting to whitewash potential research misconduct at the MIT Lincoln Laboratory facility involving a ballistic missile defense test, though a final investigation into the matter has not been completed.

Dean of Admissions Marilee Jones resigned in April 2007 after she "misrepresented her academic degrees" when she applied to an administrative assistant position in 1979 and never corrected the record despite her subsequent promotions.

=== Civic relations ===
The Cambridge City Council imposed a citywide moratorium on research into recombinant DNA in 1976 in response to community concerns that Harvard and MIT researchers may inadvertently release mutant organisms into the ecosystem but the ban was lifted in 1977 after an extensive dialogue between scientists, politicians, and community leaders. Throughout the late 1980s and early 1990s, American politicians and business leaders accused MIT and other universities of contributing to a declining economy by transferring taxpayer-funded research and technology to international — especially Japanese — firms that were competing with struggling American businesses.

The Justice Department filed an antitrust suit against MIT and the eight Ivy League colleges in 1991 for holding "Overlap Meetings" to prevent bidding wars over promising students from consuming funds for need-based scholarships. While the Ivy League institutions settled, MIT contested the charges on the grounds that the practice was not anticompetitive because it ensured the availability of aid for the greatest number of students. MIT ultimately prevailed when the Justice Department dropped the case in 1994. In 2001, the Environmental Protection Agency sued MIT for violating Clean Water Act and Clean Air Act with regard to its hazardous waste storage and disposal procedures. MIT settled the suit by paying a $155,000 fine and launching three environmental projects.

=== Suicide and mental health ===
A number of student deaths in the late 1990s and early 2000s resulted in considerable media attention to MIT's culture and student life. After the alcohol-related death of Scott Krueger in September 1997 as a new member at the Phi Gamma Delta fraternity, MIT began requiring all freshmen to live in the dormitory system. The 2000 suicide of MIT undergraduate Elizabeth Shin drew attention to suicides at MIT and created a controversy over whether MIT had an unusually high suicide rate. In late 2001 a task force's recommended improvements in student mental health services were implemented, including expanding staff and operating hours at the mental health center. These and later cases were significant as well because they sought to prove the negligence and liability of university administrators in loco parentis.

=== Faculty diversity ===
MIT has been nominally coeducational since admitting Ellen Swallow Richards in 1870. (Richards also became the first female member of MIT's faculty, specializing in sanitary chemistry.) Female students, however, remained a very small minority (numbered in dozens) prior to the completion of the first wing of a women's dormitory, McCormick Hall, in 1963. By 1993, 32% of MIT's undergraduates were female and in 2006, the number had increased to near-parity (47.5%). A 1998 MIT study concluded that a systemic bias against female faculty existed in its college of science. In 1995, faculty member Nancy Hopkins accused MIT of bias against herself and other female colleagues based on a number of issues including smaller lab space footprints and tenure related issues. The Committee on Women Faculty in the School of Science conducted a four year long review (from 1995 - 1999) of the allegations and concluded there was "subtle yet pervasive" bias against women at MIT, although no instances of intentional discrimination was found. President Vest approved "targeted actions" like the creation of 11 committees and 20% salary increases for women faculty.
Since the study, the number of women undergraduates increased from 34 percent to 42 percent, women graduate students has increased from 20 percent to 29 percent, and women outnumber men in 10 undergraduate majors. Additionally, women have headed departments within the school of science, engineering, and MIT has appointed no fewer than five female vice presidents. Susan Hockfield, a molecular neurobiologist, became MIT's 16th president on December 6, 2004 and is the first woman to hold the post. While the student body has become more balanced in recent years, women are still a distinct minority among faculty.

Tenure outcomes have vaulted MIT into the national spotlight on several occasions. The 1984 dismissal of David F. Noble, a historian of technology, became a cause célèbre about the extent to which academics are granted "freedom of speech" after he published several books and papers critical of MIT's and other research universities' reliance upon financial support from corporations and the military. Former materials science professor Gretchen Kalonji sued MIT in 1994 alleging that she was denied tenure because of sexual discrimination. In 1997, the Massachusetts Commission Against Discrimination issued a probable cause finding supporting James Jennings' allegations that he was not offered reciprocal tenure in the Department of Urban Studies and Planning for a post in MIT's Community Fellow Program after the senior faculty search committee believed that he was not a top black scholar in the country. In 2006–2007, MIT's denial of tenure to African-American biological engineering professor James Sherley prompted accusations of racism in MIT's tenure process, eventually leading to a protracted public dispute with the administration, a brief hunger strike, and the resignation of Professor Frank L. Douglas in protest.

== Globalization and new initiatives (2000—present) ==
Includes the administration of Susan Hockfield (2004–2012)

- In 2000, MIT extended the existing Writing Requirement to a new Communication Requirement, encompassing spoken as well as written expression, as an undergraduate degree requirement.
- In 2001, MIT announced that it planned to put many of its course materials online as part of its OpenCourseWare project. This was largely accomplished by 2010, with material from over 2,000 courses available to all.
- Nicholas Negroponte of the MIT Media Lab co-founded and became head of the One Laptop per Child initiative.
- Susan Hockfield launched the MIT Energy Research council to explore how MIT can respond to the interdisciplinary challenges of global energy consumption.
- Consolidation of old programs like Ocean Engineering into Mechanical Engineering and emergence of interdisciplinary departments like Biological Engineering and Computational Biology.
- International collaborations and educational initiatives with University of Cambridge in England and National University of Singapore and Nanyang Technological University in Singapore.
- In 2016 MIT established the MIT Hong Kong Innovation Node

=== Response to the COVID-19 pandemic ===
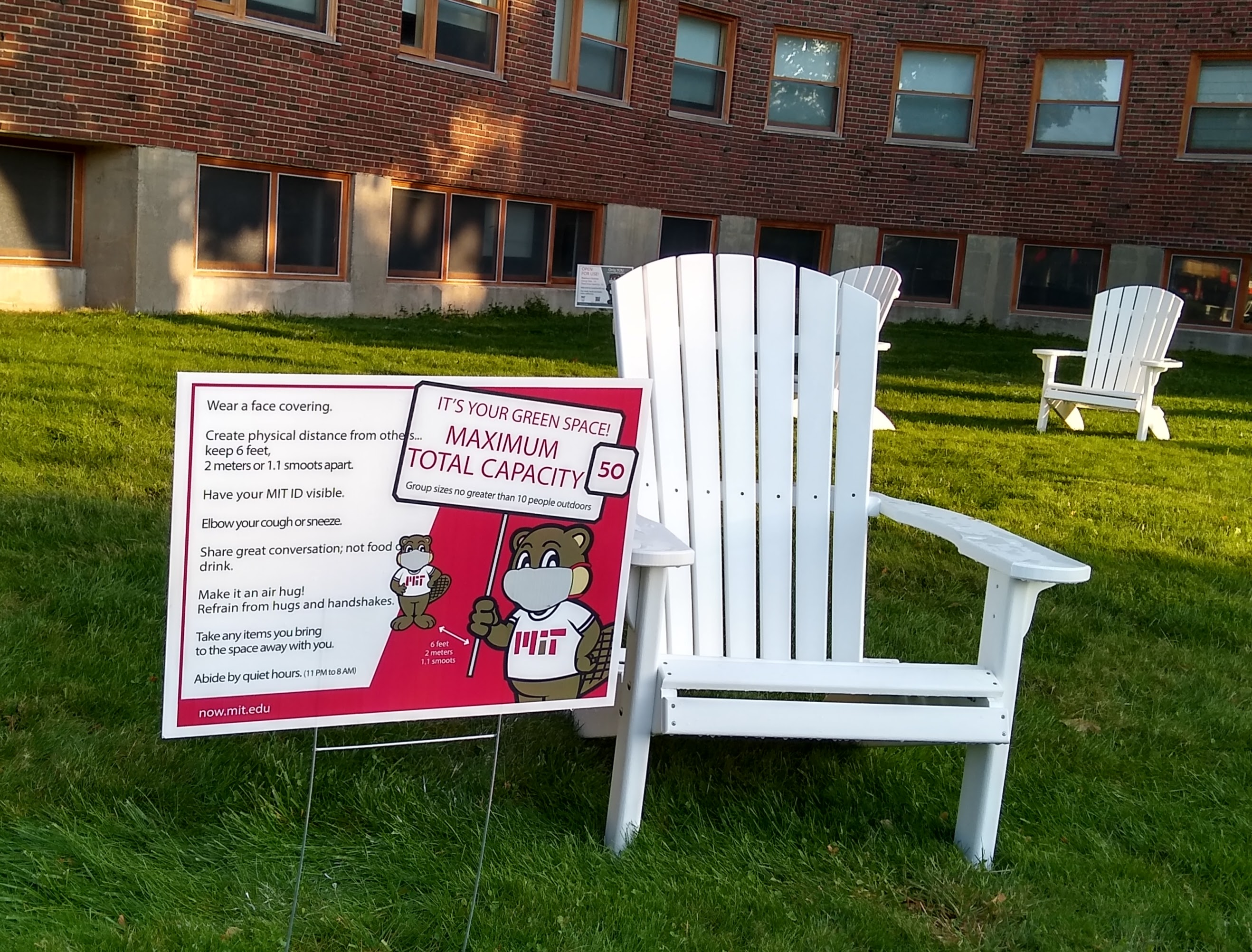
An outdoor space with COVID-19 signage on social distancing at dormitory on Memorial Drive.

The Institute announced they would be moving all classes online and student were told to move out of dormitories on March 10, 2020.

On July 7, 2020 the school announced that seniors would be allowed to return to campus in September with some in-person classes beginning on September 7 and other students would be granted access to school facilities and special consideration for housing on a case-by-case basis.

== Bibliography ==
- Adelstein, Richard P. (1988). "Mind and Hand: Economics and Engineering at the Massachusetts Institute of Technology". In William J. Barber (ed.). Economists and higher learning in the nineteenth century. Middletown, Conn.: Wesleyan University Press. ISBN 0-8195-5176-7.
- Burchard, John Ely (1948). Q.E.D.: MIT in World War II. New York: J. Wiley & Sons; Chapman & Hall. OCLC 1625883.
- Dunbar, Charles F. (July 1897). "The Career of Francis Amasa Walker". Quarterly Journal of Economics. 11 (4): 436–448. doi:10.2307/1880719. JSTOR 1880719.
- Douglas, Deborah (2010). "MIT and War". In Kaiser, David (ed.). Becoming MIT: Moments of Decision. MIT Press. pp. 81–102. JSTOR j.ctt5hhbpp.8.
- Geiger, Roger L. (1993). Research and Relevant Knowledge : American Research Universities since World War II. New York; London: Oxford University Press.
- Kevles, Daniel (1995) [1978]. The Physicists: The History of a Scientific Community in Modern America (2nd ed.). Cambridge, MA: Harvard University Press – via Internet Archive.
- Lécuyer, Christophe (1992). "The Making of a Science Based Technological University: Karl Compton, James Killian, and the Reform of MIT, 1930–1957". Historical Studies in the Physical and Biological Sciences. 23 (1): 153–180. JSTOR 27757693.
- Leslie, Stuart W. (1993). The Cold War and American Science: The Military-Industrial-Academic Complex at MIT and Stanford. New York: Columbia University Press. ISBN 9780231079587.
- Munroe, James P. (1923). A Life of Francis Amasa Walker. New York: Henry Holt & Company.
