= List of presidents of the Massachusetts Institute of Technology =

The Massachusetts Institute of Technology has had 20 presidents (18 inaugurated, 1 acting then inaugurated, 1 acting) in its 163-year history (as of 2024).

The followings have served as president of MIT:

MIT Presidents
No.	Image	Name	Term starts	Term ends	Refs.
1		William Barton Rogers	1862	1870	
2		John Daniel Runkle	1870	1878	
–		William Barton Rogers	1879	1881	
3		Francis Amasa Walker	1881	1897	
4		James Crafts	1897	1900	
5		Henry Smith Pritchett	1900	1907	
acting		Arthur Amos Noyes	1907	1909	
6		Richard Cockburn Maclaurin	1909	January 15, 1920 (Note: Died in office.)	
acting		Elihu Thomson	1920	1921	
7		Ernest Fox Nichols	1921	1922	
acting		Elihu Thomson	1922	1923	
8		Samuel Wesley Stratton	1923	1930	
9		Karl Taylor Compton	1930	1948	
10		James Rhyne Killian	1948	1959	
11		Julius Adams Stratton	1959	1966	
12		Howard Wesley Johnson	1966	1971	
13		Jerome Wiesner	October 7, 1971	September 25, 1980	
14		Paul Edward Gray	September 26, 1980	October 14, 1990	
15		Charles Marstiller Vest	October 15, 1990	December 5, 2004	
16		Susan Hockfield	December 6, 2004	July 1, 2012	
17		L. Rafael Reif	July 2, 2012	December 31, 2022	
18		Sally Kornbluth	January 1, 2023	Incumbent	
