= William Barton Rogers =

American scientist, founder of MIT (1804–1882)

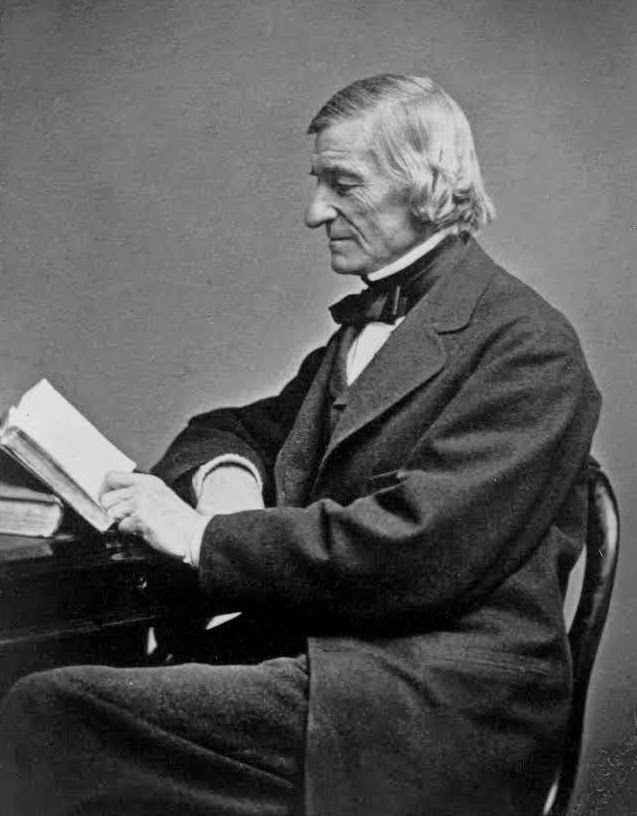

3rd President of the National Academy of Sciences
- In office 1879–1883
- Preceded by: Joseph Henry
- Succeeded by: Othniel Charles Marsh

1st President of the Massachusetts Institute of Technology
- In office 1878–1881
- Preceded by: John Daniel Runkle
- Succeeded by: Francis Amasa Walker
- In office 1862–1870
- Preceded by: office established
- Succeeded by: John Daniel Runkle

Personal details
- Born: December 7, 1804 Philadelphia, Pennsylvania, US
- Died: May 30, 1882 (aged 77) Boston, Massachusetts, US
- Education: College of William and Mary (no degree)
- Known for: Founder of the Massachusetts Institute of Technology
- Scientific career
- Fields: Chemistry, physics, geology
- Workplaces: College of William and Mary; University of Virginia; Massachusetts Institute of Technology

William Barton Rogers (December 7, 1804 – May 30, 1882) was an American geologist, physicist, and the founder and first president of the Massachusetts Institute of Technology (MIT).

An acclaimed lecturer in the physical sciences, Rogers taught at College of William & Mary (1828–1835) and the University of Virginia (1835–1853). While at the university, he served as Virginia's first state geologist and led the state's first geological survey. After meeting Emma Savage in Boston, he married and moved there in 1853.

A proponent of practical observation and scientific reasoning, Rogers believed that a university for the "useful arts" could be essential in an age of industrial progress. In 1861, Rogers secured funding for an "institute of technology" from the Massachusetts legislature. When MIT opened in 1865, Rogers was its first president and physics instructor. Ill health caused him to step away from his duties in 1868, although he stayed active in forming the Institute's curriculum, fundraising, and efforts at coeducation. He returned as MIT's president in 1878, stepped down three years later, and died while giving MIT's 1882 graduation speech.

During the time Rogers lived in Virginia, he was a slaveowner, with two slaves in his household in 1840 and six slaves in 1850; one, his cook, was Isabella Gibbons.

== Biography ==
=== Early life ===
Rogers was born on December 7, 1804, in Philadelphia, Pennsylvania. He was the second son of Patrick Kerr Rogers and Hannah Blythe and was of Irish, Scottish, and English extraction. Patrick Rogers was born in Newtownstewart, County Tyrone, Ireland and had immigrated at the end of the 18th century to America, where he graduated from the University of Pennsylvania and practiced medicine. When William Barton was born, Patrick Rogers was tutor at Penn. In 1819 Patrick Rogers became professor of natural philosophy and mathematics at the College of William and Mary, where he remained until his death.

William Barton Rogers had three brothers: James Blythe Rogers (1802–1852), Henry Darwin Rogers (1808–1866), and Robert Empie Rogers (1813–1884). The Rogers brothers would each grow up to be distinguished scientists.

=== Education ===
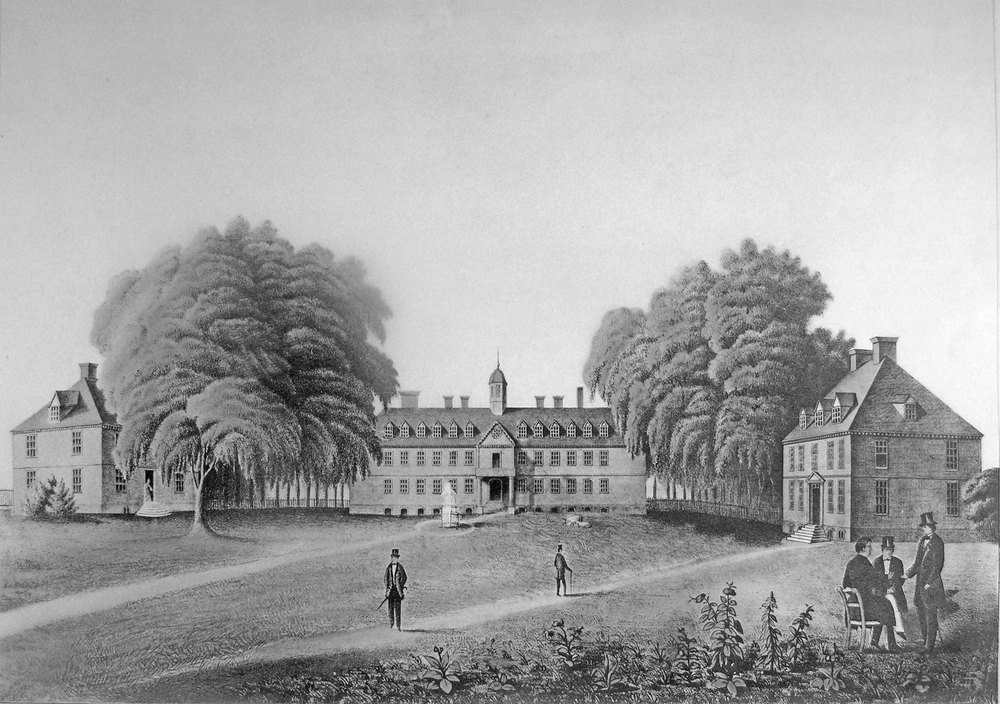
In 1859, Rogers purchased a version of this Millington print of the William & Mary campus c. 1840. His family had lived in the Brafferton, the house on the left.

William Barton Rogers was educated by his father Patrick Kerr Rogers and attended the public schools of Baltimore, Maryland. In 1819, his father was appointed as professor of natural history and chemistry at the College of William and Mary in Virginia and the family moved to Williamsburg, Virginia. According to MIT Libraries, William Barton Rogers attended the College of William and Mary from 1819 to 1824, but he "apparently did not receive a degree" and there was no evidence showing that he graduated. Decades later, in 1859, he visited Williamsburg and reminisced in letter to his brother about the place's profound impact on them:

"I obtained in Williamsburg some lithograph views of the college and surroundings taken by Millington's son...Though a poor specimen of art, it will be precious as reminding us of the home of our dear father, and the spot where we first caught the inspiration of science."

=== Scientific career ===
William Barton Rogers delivered a series of lectures on science before the Maryland Institute in 1827, and succeeded his father as professor of natural philosophy and chemistry at William and Mary in 1828, where he remained until 1835. During this time, he carried on investigations on dew and on the voltaic battery, and prepared a series of papers on the greensand and calcareous marl minerals of eastern Virginia and their value as fertilizers.

==== Field geology (1833–1842) ====
In 1833, his brother Henry had returned from England filled with enthusiasm for geology, and this had prompted Rogers to begin studies in the field. The practical value of his article on greensand caught the eye of the Virginia legislature. Rogers took this opportunity to lobby for a geological survey of Virginia, and he was called upon to organize it in 1835. That same year, he and his brother Henry were elected members of the American Philosophical Society.

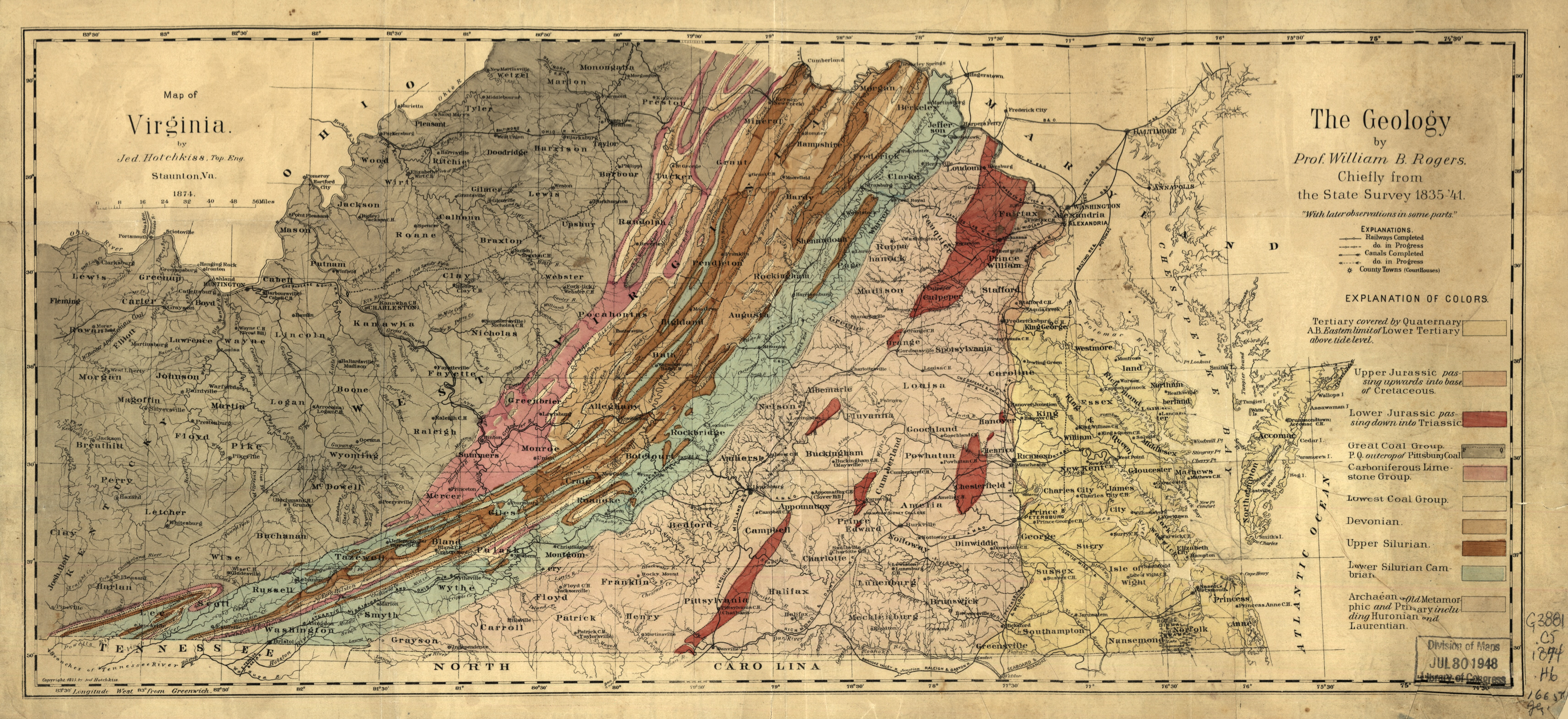
1874 geological map of Virginia. Rogers' contributed coloring based on his 1835 partial survey.

By 1835, his brother Henry was state geologist of Pennsylvania, and together the brothers unfolded the historical geology of the Appalachian chain. Among their joint special investigations were the study of the solvent action of water on various minerals and rocks, and the demonstration that "coal beds stand in close genetic relation to the amount of disturbance to which the inclosing strata have been submitted, the coal becoming harder and containing less volatile matter as the evidence of the disturbance increases". In modern terms, this was the realization that the geological process of metamorphism had gradually transformed softer grades of coal, such as lignite, into harder grades, such as anthracite.

Together, the brothers published a paper on "The Laws of Structure of the more Disturbed Zones of the Earth's Crust", in which the wave theory of mountain chains was first announced. This was followed later by William Rogers' statement of the law of distribution of geological faults. These pioneering works contributed to a better understanding of the vast coal beds underlying some parts of the Appalachian region, and helped pave the way for the Industrial Revolution in the United States.

In 1842 the work of the survey closed. State revenues had shrunk beginning in 1837, and the funding for the survey had been cut back. Meanwhile, Rogers had published six "Reports of the Geological Survey of the State of Virginia" (Richmond, 1836–40), though there were few copies, and recognition of their significance was slow to develop. They were later compiled by Jed Hotchkiss and issued in one volume with a map as Papers on the Geology of Virginia (New York, 1884).

==== University of Virginia appointment (1835–1853) ====
In 1835 Rogers also began serving as professor of "natural philosophy" at the University of Virginia (UVA). There he added mineralogy and geology to the curriculum, and did original research in geology, chemistry and physics. While he was chair of the department of philosophy at UVA, he vigorously defended to the Virginia State Legislature the university's refusal to award honorary degrees, a policy which continues today. (Later, MIT would adopt a similar policy from its beginning, and continuing to the present).

Rogers, additionally, played a leading role in the founding of the University of Virginia School of Engineering and Applied Science (then known as the School of Civil Engineering). The school was only the fourth in the United States dedicated to engineering instruction, was the first such program in the American South still active today, and was the first in the U.S. located within a comprehensive university.

Rogers was chairman of the faculty of UVA from 1844 until 1845.

During the time Rogers lived in Virginia, he was a slaveowner, with two slaves in his household in 1840 and six slaves in 1850; one, his cook, was Isabella Gibbons.

==== Move to Boston ====
In 1849, he married Emma Savage of Boston, daughter of James Savage, a prominent banker. In 1853 he resigned from the University of Virginia, moving to Boston for two principal reasons. First, he wanted to increase his participation in scientific circles under the auspices of the Boston Society of Natural History and the American Academy of Arts and Sciences, in whose proceedings and in the American Journal of Science his papers had been published while at Virginia. Second, and more importantly, Rogers wanted to implement a scheme for technical education, which could not be achieved within the structure and institutional focuses of UVa. He desired to have associated, on one side, scientific research and investigation on the largest scale and, on the other side, agencies for the popular diffusion of useful knowledge. This project continued to occupy his attention until it culminated in the chartering of the Massachusetts Institute of Technology (1861), of which he became first president.

To raise funds and public awareness of his new Institute, Rogers delivered a course of lectures before the Lowell Institute on "The Application of Science to the Arts" in 1862.

In 1861, he was appointed inspector of gas and gas meters for the state of Massachusetts, a post he accepted reluctantly. During his service, he improved the standards of measurement.

=== MIT Presidency ===
For more detail, see History of the Massachusetts Institute of Technology.

An act of the Massachusetts State Legislature incorporated MIT in 1861, and Rogers became its first president in 1862. He served as president of MIT until 1870, when he stood down because of declining health. By necessity, he returned to office in 1878 and continued to 1881, when he was made professor emeritus of physics and geology, which position he had held while he was president.

He died after collapsing during a speech at MIT's 1882 commencement exercises. According to legend his last words were "bituminous coal":

He fell to the platform – instantly dead. All his life he had borne himself most faithfully and heroically, and he died as so good a knight would surely have wished, in harness, at his post, and in the very part and act of public duty.

=== Other affiliations ===
Rogers was chairman of the Association of American Geologists and Naturalists (AAGN; organized 1840) in 1845 and again in 1847, and contributed important memoirs to its Transactions, including observations on the temperature of coal mines in eastern Virginia. In 1847 he also called to order the first meeting of the American Association for the Advancement of Science (AAAS), an enlargement of the AAGN. He was president of the AAAS in 1875, and elected its first honorary fellow in 1881, as a special mark of distinction. He was active in founding the American Social Science Association and its first president; also he was one of the corporate members of the National Academy of Sciences, and its president from 1878 until his death. In 1866, Harvard gave him the degree of LL.D.

== Legacy ==
Because of his affiliation with Virginia, Mount Rogers, the highest peak in the state, is named after him.

== Works ==
Besides numerous papers on geology, chemistry, and physics, contributed to the proceedings of societies and technical journals, he was the author of:

- Strength of Materials (Charlottesville, 1838)
- Elements of Mechanical Philosophy (Boston, 1852)
- Papers on the Geology of Virginia (New York, 1884)

Academic offices
New office	1st President of the Massachusetts Institute of Technology; 1862 – 1870	Succeeded by John Daniel Runkle
Preceded by John Daniel Runkle	1st President of the Massachusetts Institute of Technology; 1878 – 1881	Succeeded by Francis Amasa Walker
Professional and academic associations
Preceded by Joseph Henry	3rd President of the National Academy of Sciences; 1879 – 1883	Succeeded by Othniel Charles Marsh
