= Francis Amasa Walker =

American economist, statistician, journalist and educator

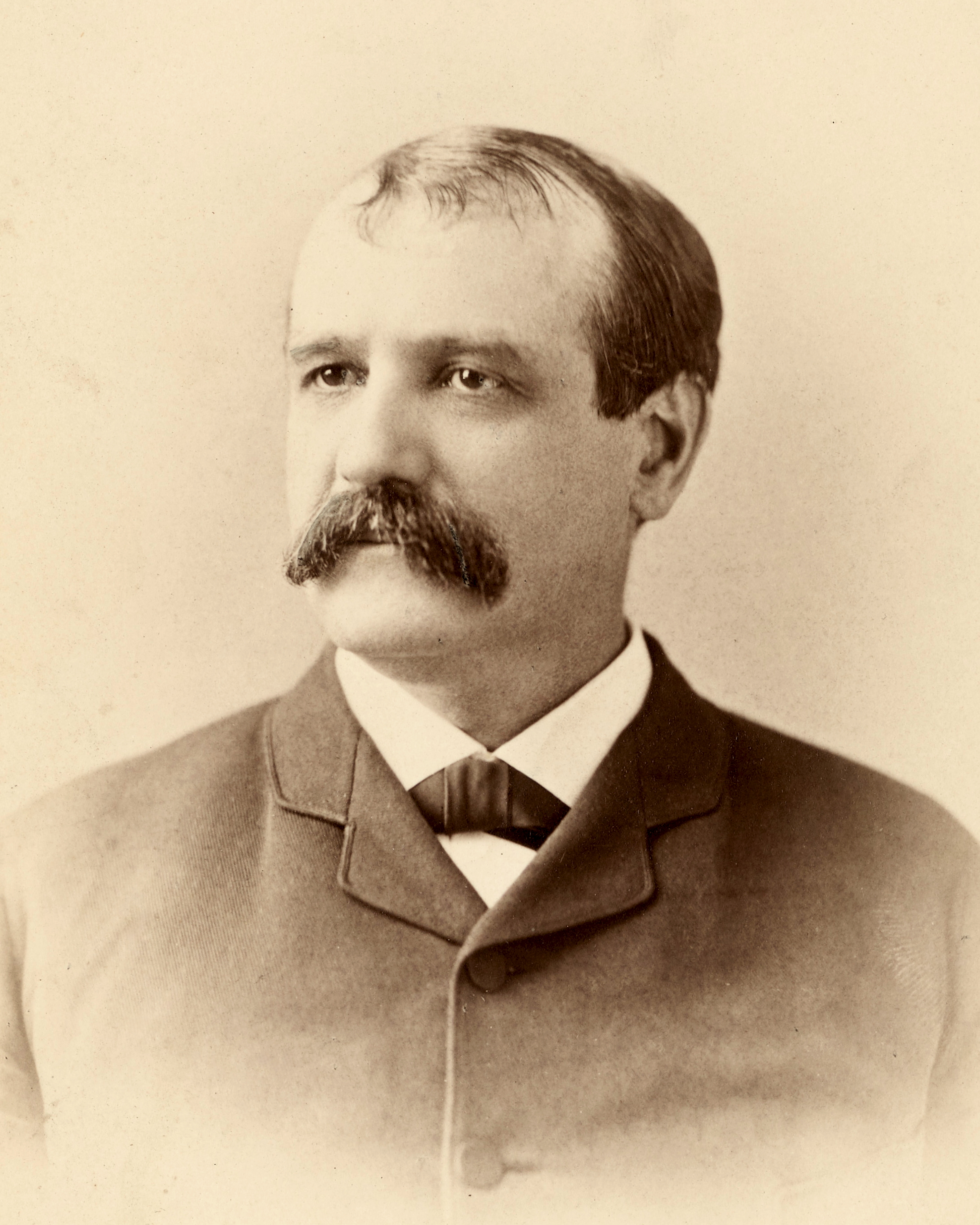
- Walker c. 1885

3rd President of the Massachusetts Institute of Technology
- In office May 25, 1881 – January 5, 1897
- Preceded by: John Daniel Runkle
- Succeeded by: James Crafts

17th Commissioner of the Bureau of Indian Affairs
- In office November 1871 – December 26, 1872
- President: Ulysses S. Grant
- Preceded by: Ely S. Parker
- Succeeded by: Edward Parmelee Smith

Personal details
- Born: July 2, 1840 Boston, Massachusetts, US
- Died: January 5, 1897 (aged 56) Boston, Massachusetts, US
- Resting place: Walnut Grove Cemetery, North Brookfield, Massachusetts
- Spouse: Exene Evelyn Stoughton
- Children: 7
- Parent(s): Hanna Ambrose; Amasa Walker
- Education: Amherst College
- Military career
- Allegiance: United States; Union
- Branch: Union Army
- Rank: Brevet Brigadier General
- Conflicts: American Civil War

Francis Amasa Walker (July 2, 1840 – January 5, 1897) was an American economist, statistician, journalist, educator, academic administrator, and an officer in the Union Army. As a prolific author and the third president of the Massachusetts Institute of Technology (MIT) until his death in 1897, Walker was a leading political economist and advocate for a policy of bimetallism by international agreement. His scholarly contributions are widely recognized as having broadened, liberalized, and modernized economic and statistical theory with contributions to wages, wealth distribution, money, and social economics, and he is credited with developing the residual theory of wage distribution.

Walker was born into a prominent Boston family, the son of the economist and politician Amasa Walker, and he graduated from Amherst College at the age of 20. He received a commission to join the 15th Massachusetts Infantry and quickly rose through the ranks as an assistant adjutant general. Walker fought in the Peninsula, Bristoe, Overland, and Richmond-Petersburg Campaigns before being captured by Confederate forces and held at the infamous Libby Prison. In July 1866, he was awarded the honorary grade of brevet brigadier general United States Volunteers, to rank from March 13, 1865, when he was 24 years old.

Following the war, Walker served on the editorial staff of the Springfield Republican before using his family and military connections to gain appointment as the chief of the Bureau of Statistics from 1869 to 1870 and superintendent of the 1870 census where he published an award-winning Statistical Atlas visualizing the data for the first time. He joined Yale University's Sheffield Scientific School as a professor of political economy in 1872 and rose to international prominence serving as a chief member of the 1876 Philadelphia Exposition, American representative to the 1878 International Monetary Conference, President of the American Statistical Association in 1882, and inaugural president of the American Economic Association in 1886, and vice president of the National Academy of Sciences in 1890. Walker led the 1880 census which resulted in a twenty-two-volume census, cementing Walker's reputation as the nation's preeminent statistician.

As an economist, Walker debunked the wage-fund doctrine and engaged in a prominent scholarly debate with Henry George on land, rent, and taxes. Walker argued in support of bimetallism and although he was an opponent of the nascent socialist movement, he argued that obligations existed between the employer and the employed. He published his International Bimetallism at the height of the 1896 presidential election campaign in which economic issues were prominent. Walker was a prolific writer, authoring ten books on political economy and military history. In recognition of his contributions to economic theory, beginning in 1947, the American Economic Association recognized the lifetime achievement of an individual economist with a "Francis A. Walker Medal".

Walker accepted the presidency of the Massachusetts Institute of Technology in 1881, a position he held for fifteen years until his death. During his tenure, he placed the institution on more stable financial footing by aggressively fund-raising and securing grants from the Massachusetts government, implemented many curricular reforms, oversaw the launch of new academic programs, and expanded the size of the Boston campus, faculty, and student enrollments. MIT's Walker Memorial Hall, a former students' clubhouse and one of the original buildings on the Charles River campus, was dedicated to him in 1916. Walker's reputation today is a subject of controversy due to his anti-immigration views, white supremacist views, and his brief association with the U.S. Bureau of Indian Affairs.

== Background ==
Walker was born in Boston, Massachusetts on July 2, 1840, the youngest son of Hanna (née Ambrose) and Amasa Walker, a prominent economist and state politician who had been a candidate for mayor of Boston in 1837. The Walkers had three children, Emma (born 1835), Robert (born 1837), and Francis. Because the Walkers' next-door neighbor was Oliver Wendell Holmes Sr., the junior Walker and junior Holmes were playmates as young children and renewed their friendship later in life. In 1843, the family moved from Boston to North Brookfield, Massachusetts and remained there.

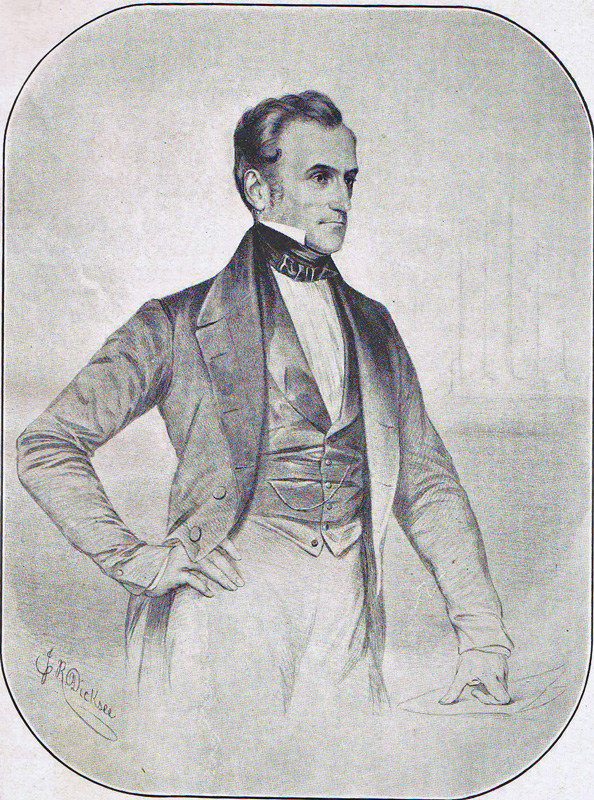
Walker's father, Amasa Walker, was a prominent economist and politician in Massachusetts.

Beginning his schooling at the age of seven, Walker studied Latin at various private and public schools in Brookfield before being sent to Leicester Academy when he was twelve. He completed his college preparation by the time he was fourteen, spent another year studying Greek and Latin under the future suffragist and abolitionist Lucy Stone, and entered Amherst College at the age of fifteen. Although he had planned to matriculate at Harvard after his first year at Amherst, Walker's father believed Francis was too young for the larger college and insisted he remain at Amherst. While he had entered with the class of 1859, Walker became ill during his first year there and fell back a year. He was a member of the Delta Kappa and Athenian societies as a freshman, joined and withdrew from Alpha Sigma Phi as a sophomore on account of "rowdyism", and finally joined Delta Kappa Epsilon. As a student, Walker was awarded the Sweetser Essay Prize and the Hardy Prize for extemporaneous speaking. He graduated in 1860 as Phi Beta Kappa with a degree in law. After graduation, he joined the law firm of Charles Devens and George Frisbie Hoar in Worcester, Massachusetts.

== Military service ==
=== 15th Massachusetts Infantry ===
As tensions leading to the American Civil War increased over the winter of 1860–61, Walker equipped himself and began drilling with 3rd Battalion of Rifles in Worcester and in New York, led by his legal mentor Charles Devens. Amasa Walker objected to Francis mobilizing with the first wave of volunteers, although his older brother Robert served in the 34th Massachusetts Infantry. Walker returned to Worcester but began to lobby Governor John Albion Andrew and Adjutant General William Schouler to grant him a commission as a second lieutenant under Devens's command of the 15th Massachusetts Infantry.

In July 1861, following his twenty-first birthday and the First Battle of Bull Run, Walker secured his father's consent to join the war effort, as well as assurances from Devens that he would receive a commission as lieutenant. However, the commission never materialized, and Devens instead offered an appointment as a sergeant major, which Walker assumed on August 1, 1861. By September 14, however, Walker had been recommended by Devens and reassigned as assistant adjutant general to brigadier general Darius N. Couch and promoted to captain. Walker remained in Washington, D.C., over the winter of 1861–62 and did not see combat until May 1862 at the Battle of Williamsburg. In the summer of 1862, Walker also served in the Army of the Potomac under major general George B. McClellan at the Battle of Seven Pines and the Seven Days Battles of the Peninsula Campaign.

=== Second Army Corps ===
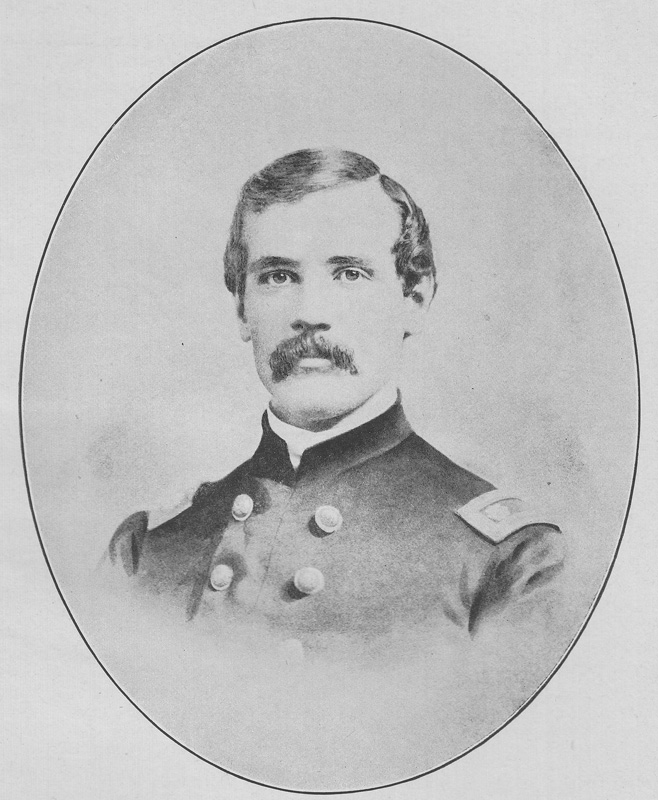
Walker as an assistant assistant adjutant general in the II Army Corps.

Walker remained at Berkeley Plantation until August 11, 1862, when he was promoted to major and transferred with General Couch to the II Corps of the Army of the Potomac. Although the Corps saw action at Antietam on September 17 and Fredericksburg in December, Walker and the Corps did not join the Mud March offensive over the winter. On January 1, 1863, Walker was promoted to lieutenant colonel. At the Battle of Chancellorsville in May 1863, his left hand and wrist were shattered, and his neck was lacerated by an exploding shell. A record of the 1880 census indicated that Walker had "compound fracture of the metacarpal bones of the left hand resulting in permanent extension of his hand". Later in 1896, Walker received one of the first radiographs in the United States, which documented the extent of the damage to his hand.

Walker did not return to service until August 1863. He participated in the Bristoe campaign and narrowly escaped encirclement during the Battle of Bristoe Station on October 13, before withdrawing and encamping near Berry Hill Plantation for much of the winter and spending some leave in the North.

After extensive reorganization during the winter of 1863–64, Walker and the Army of the Potomac fought in the Overland Campaign in May and June 1864. The Battle of Cold Harbor in early June took a substantial toll on the ranks of the II Corps, and Walker's knee was injured during the battle. In the ensuing Richmond-Petersburg campaign, Walker was appointed a brevet colonel. On August 25, at the Second Battle of Ream's Station, Walker was surrounded and captured by the 11th Georgia Infantry Regiment. On August 27, Walker escaped a marching column but was recaptured by the 51st North Carolina Infantry after trying to swim across the Appomattox River and nearly drowning. After being held in Petersburg, he was transferred to the infamous Libby Prison in Richmond, where his older brother was also held. In October 1864, Walker was released with thirty other prisoners as a part of an exchange.

Walker returned to North Brookfield to recuperate and resigned his commission on January 8, 1865, as a result of his injuries and health. At the end of the war, major general Winfield Scott Hancock recommended that Walker be brevetted as a brigadier general of the United States Volunteers, in recognition of his meritorious services during the war and especially his gallant conduct at Chancellorsville. On July 9, 1866, President Andrew Johnson nominated Walker for appointment to the honorary grade of brevet brigadier general, U.S. Volunteers, to rank from March 13, 1865, for gallant conduct at the battle of Chancellorsville and meritorious services during the war. The United States Senate confirmed the appointment on July 23, 1866.

After the war, Walker became a companion of the Massachusetts Commandery of the Military Order of the Loyal Legion of the United States (Loyal Legion). In 1883, Walker was elected Commander of the Massachusetts Loyal Legion and was also the president of the National Military Historical Association. Based upon his military experience, Walker published a biography of General Winfield Scott Hancock (1884) and a history of II Corps (1886).

== Public service ==
By late spring 1865, Walker had regained sufficient strength and began lecturing on political economy at Amherst and assisting his father in the preparation of his new book, The Science of Wealth. He also taught Latin, Greek, and mathematics at Williston Seminary until being offered an editorial position at the Springfield Republican by Samuel Bowles. At the Republican, Walker wrote on Reconstruction era politics, railroad regulation, and representation.

=== 1870 census superintendent ===
In January 1869, while his editorial career was moving forward, Walker secured an appointment as the chief of the United States Bureau of Statistics and deputy special commissioner of Internal Revenue. On January 29, Secretary of the Interior Jacob D. Cox notified Walker that he was being nominated as superintendent of the 1870 census. After he was confirmed by the Senate, Walker sought to strike a moderate, reformist position. However, proposed reform legislation was not passed, and the 1870 census proceeded under the rules governing previous collections, which Walker deemed inefficient and unscientific. Walker lacked authority to determine, enforce, or control the personnel, methods, or timing of the census, all of which were regularly manipulated by local political interests. The 1870 census also posed the challenges of post-war reconstruction and would be the first in which emancipated African Americans would be fully counted in the census.

The census was completed and tabulated several months behind schedule to much popular criticism, which led indirectly to a deterioration in Walker's health during the spring of 1871. Walker took leave to travel to England with Bowles in summer 1871 to recuperate. Walker continued to work on the 1870 census for several years, culminating in the publication of the first Statistical Atlas of the United States, which was unprecedented in its use of visual statistics and maps to report the census results. The Atlas won Walker praise from the secretary of the Smithsonian Institution and a first-class medal from the International Geographical Congress.

=== Commissioner of Indian Affairs ===
Upon his return to the United States in fall 1871, Walker declined an offer to join The New York Times editorial board with an annual salary of $8,000 ($186,241 in 2024) and accepted an offer from Secretary of the Interior Columbus Delano to become the United States Commissioner of Indian Affairs. The appointment permitted Walker to maintain his federal responsibilities as census superintendent, despite appropriations for the position ending, and offered a political opportunity to improve on the administration of Commissioner Ely S. Parker, who left office under a cloud of scandal. Walker served only briefly as Commissioner of Indian Affairs, resigning on December 26, 1872, to take a faculty position at Yale University, after considering a return to editorial journalism and even briefly entertaining the idea of manufacturing shoes with his brother-in-law in North Brookfield.

During his service, he collected demographic information on native tribes and on the history of conflict and treaties, which he published as a book titled The Indian Question in 1874. More than half of the book is dedicated to an appendix with descriptions of over 100 tribes which he describes as including 300,000 natives, the majority of which were living on existing government reservations. The Indian Question weighs the reservation system as it existed in 1874 against full assimilation and United States citizenship. He argues that the reservation system is failing due to illegal incursions into the native lands, but counters that immediate full assimilation damages native culture, quality of life, and dignity. Walker concluded that assimilation must be the ultimate end goal, but that assimilation required protection of the indigenous population “under the shell of the reservation system.” He proposed detailed solutions, including consolidation of the existing reservations into fewer larger units, laws and enforcement against settler incursions, government-sponsored training programs within reservations, and federal financial support based on an endowment and not annual appropriations.

Walker supported reparations for past actions toward Native Americans, arguing,

“We may have no fear that the dying curse of the red man, outcast and homeless by our fault, will bring barrenness upon the soil that once was his, or dry the streams of the beautiful land that, through so much of evil and of good, has become our patrimony; but surely we shall be clearer in our lives, and freer to meet the glances of our sons and grandsons, if in our generation we do justice and show mercy to a race which has been impoverished that we might be made rich.”

Walker elevated the treatment of the natives as one of the great issues of the time, arguing, “The United States will be judged at the bar of history according to what they shall have done in two respects: by their disposition of negro slavery and by their treatment of the Indians.”

=== Other work ===
While working at Yale in 1876, Walker was recruited by Henry Adams as editor-in-chief of the Boston Post, after Adams failed to recruit Horace White and Charles Nordhoff for the position. In spring of the same year, Walker was nominated by the Republican Party for Secretary of the State of Connecticut on a reform platform, but ultimately lost to Democratic incumbent Marvin H. Sanger by a margin of 7,200 votes out of 99,000 cast. In the summer, Amherst faculty attempted to recruit Walker as president of Amherst, but the position went instead to the Julius Hawley Seelye to appease more conservative trustees.

In 1876, Charles Francis Adams Jr. appointed Walker as the chief of the Bureau of Awards at the Centennial Exposition in Philadelphia. In contrast to global expositions in Europe, which were fraught with national factionalism and a superabundance of awards, Walker imposed a much leaner operation, replacing juries with judges and awarding prizes more selectively. His work on the exposition won Walker formal international recognition. He received honors from Sweden, Norway and Spain and was invited to serve as assistant Commissioner General at the 1878 Paris Exposition.

The exposition greatly increased Walker's interest in technical education and introduced him to Massachusetts Institute of Technology (MIT) president John D. Runkle and treasurer John C. Cummings.

While at Yale, Walker served as a member of the School Committee at New Haven (1877–1880) and the Connecticut Board of Education (1878–1881). After returning to Boston to serve as president of MIT in 1881, he served as a member of the Massachusetts Board of Education (1882–1890), Boston School Committee (1885–1888), Boston Art Commission (1885–1897), Boston Park Commission (1890–1896), Massachusetts Historical Society (1883–1897), and a trustee of the Boston Public Library in 1896.

=== 1880 census superintendent ===
Walker accepted an appointment as the superintendent of the 1880 census. A new law, spearheaded by James A. Garfield, had been passed to allow Walker to appoint trained enumerators free from political influence. The 1880 census notably suggested population of the Southern states had improbably increased from the 1870 census; an investigation revealed that the 1870 figures had been inaccurately enumerated. Walker publicized the discrepancy, even though it effectively discredited the accuracy of his 1870 work. Walker also used the position as a bully pulpit to advocate for the creation of a permanent United States Census Bureau, to ensure professional statisticians could be trained and retained and that the information could be widely disseminated.

The 1880 census was again delayed as a result of its size and subject to praise and criticism on its comprehensiveness and relevance. The 1880 census resulted in the publication of twenty-two volumes. It was popularly regarded as the best census up to that time and established Walker's reputation as the preeminent American statistician. Following Garfield's victory in the 1880 presidential election, there was wide speculation that Walker would be appointed Secretary of the Interior, but Walker instead accepted the offer to become MIT president in spring 1881.

== Academic career and views ==
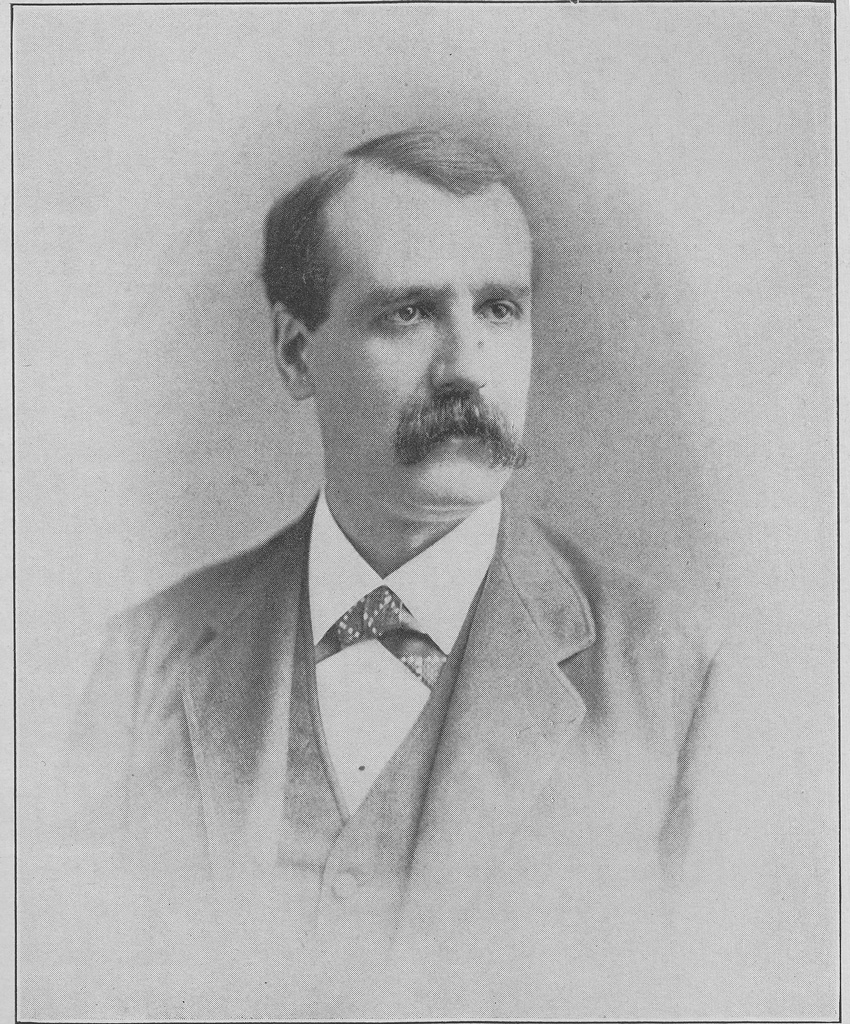
Walker as a professor of Political Economy at the Sheffield Scientific School

In October 1872, Walker was unanimously offered a position at the recently established Sheffield Scientific School of Yale University, led by the mineralogist George Jarvis Brush. He filled the position vacated by Daniel Coit Gilman, who became president of the University of California, Berkeley.

Walker's scholarly contributions are widely recognized as having broadened, liberalized, and modernized economic and statistical theory with his contributions to wages, wealth distribution, money, and social economics. Although his arguments presaged both neoclassical economics and institutionalism, he is not readily classified into either. His textbook Political Economy, first published in 1883, was one of the most widely used textbooks of the 19th century as a component of the American Science Series. A 20th century economist, Robert Solow, appraised the third edition, published in 1888, as embodying the state of the art of economics at the time, but criticized it for lacking facts and figures, and incorporating unsupported judgments on the practices and capacities of Native Americans and immigrants.

He was elected as an honorary member of the Royal Statistical Society in 1875, a member of the American Antiquarian Society in 1876, and a member of the National Academy of Sciences in 1878, where he served as the vice president from 1890 until his death. In addition to being elected as the president of the American Statistical Association in 1882, he helped found and launch the International Statistical Institute in 1885 and was named its "President-adjoint" in 1893. Walker also served as the inaugural president of the American Economic Association from 1885 to 1892. In 1886, he was elected an honorary member of the American Society of Mechanical Engineers. In 1892, Walker was elected to Honorary membership of the Manchester Literary and Philosophical Society.

He took appointments as a lecturer at Johns Hopkins University (its first professor of economics) from 1877 to 1879, lecturer at Harvard University in 1882, 1883, and 1896, and trustee at Amherst College from 1879 to 1889.

Walker was awarded honorary or ad eundem degrees from Amherst (M.A. 1863, Ph.D. 1875, LL.D. 1882), Yale (M.A. 1873, LL.D. 1882), Harvard (LL.D. 1883), Columbia (LL.D. 1887), St. Andrews (LL.D. 1888), Dublin (LL.D. 1892), Halle (Ph.D. 1894), and Edinburgh (LL.D. 1896).

Prior to his death, Walker was working on a book on the economic history of the United States, based on his lectures on the subject. However, he was unable to complete it.

=== Political economy ===
==== Wages ====
As a professor of political economy at Yale, his first major scholarly contribution was The Wages Question (1876) which set out to debunk the wage–fund doctrine and address radical proposals of obligations between the employer and the employed. His theory of wage distribution later came to be known as residual theory and set the stage for contributions by John Bates Clark on the marginal productivity theory. Despite Walker's advocacy for profit sharing and expansion of educational opportunities using trade and industrial schools, he was an avowed opponent of the nascent socialist movement and published critiques of Edward Bellamy's popular novel Looking Backward.

==== Currency ====
In August 1878, Walker represented the United States at the second International Monetary Conference in Paris while also attending the 1878 Exposition Universelle. At the conference, efforts by the United States to re-establish an international silver standard defeated, and Walker had to scramble to complete his report on the Exposition in only four days. Although he returned to the U.S. in October disheartened by the failure of the conference and exhausted by his obligations at the Exposition, the trip secured Walker a commanding national and international reputation.

In 1896, Walker published International Bimetallism, roundly critiquing the demonetization of silver as the result of political pressure and arguing that the change had negatively impacted prices and profits, as well as worker employment and wages, and urging the adoption of international agreements to monetize silver. International Bimetallism was published amidst the 1896 presidential election, which pitted populist "free silver" candidate William Jennings Bryan against William McKinley, running on a "sound money" platform which called for maintaining the gold standard unless modified by international agreement, as Walker had called for. Competing interpretations of Walker's stance became a political football during the campaign. Walker's position isolated him among public figures and made him a target in the press; he was supported by Republican bankers and statesmen including Henry Lee Higginson, George F. Hoar, John M. Forbes, and Henry Cabot Lodge. In his famous Cross of Gold speech, Bryan directly criticized the argument that bimetallism should only be adopted by international agreement, recounting the failed attempts at the International Monetary Conferences and instead calling for unilateral American adoption of a bimetallic standard:

If they say bimetallism is good, but that we cannot have it until other nations help us, we reply that, instead of having a gold standard because England has, we will restore bimetallism, and then let England have bimetallism because the United States has it.

==== Debate with Henry George ====
Beginning in 1879, Walker and the political economist Henry George engaged in a public debate over economic rents, land, money, and taxes. Walker published Land and Its Rent in 1883, based on a series of lectures delivered at Harvard, as a criticism of George's 1879 Progress and Poverty. Walker's argued that the primary cause of economic depressions was not land speculation, but rather constriction of the money supply, a position he would later elaborate in International Bimetallism. Walker also criticized George's assumptions that technical progress was always labor saving and whether land held for speculation was unproductive or inefficient.

=== Social Darwinism and race ===
Walker was a strong believer in social Darwinism, eugenics, and immigration restriction. According to historian Mae Ngai, Walker's theories and writings were foundational for the modern American nativist movement, and he believed the United States "possessed a natural character and teleology, to which immigration was external and unnatural. [His] assumption resonated with conventional views about America's providential mission and the general march of progress. Yet, it was rooted in a profoundly conservative viewpoint that the composition of the American nation should never change."

Walker also took an interest in demographics later in his career, particularly towards the issues of immigration and birth rates. He published The Growth of the United States in 1882, arguing for restrictions on immigration out of concern about the diminished industrial and intellectual capacity of recent immigrants. In 1896, he repeated these concerns in an article titled "Restriction of Immigration" in the Atlantic Monthly, which argued that immigrants from Austria-Hungary, Italy, and the Russian Empire were "vast masses of peasantry, degraded below our utmost conceptions . . . beaten men from beaten races, representing the worst failures in the struggle for existence" and that without racial immigration restriction, "every foul and stagnant pool of population in Europe, which no breath of intellectual life has stirred for ages ... [will] be decanted upon our shores." Walker argued that immigration to the United States would entail "race-suicide" for Anglo-Saxons, and he also argued that unrestricted immigration was the major reason behind nineteenth-century Native American fertility decline.

== President of MIT ==
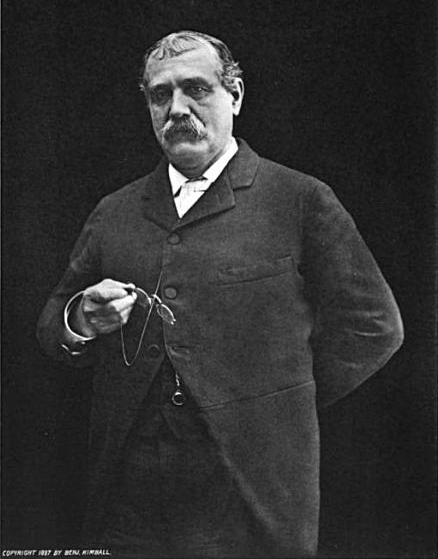
Walker as President of MIT

Walker was first offered the presidency of Massachusetts Institute of Technology (MIT) in June 1880 by its founder William Barton Rogers, after its financial stability was severely weakened by the Panic of 1873 and subsequent Long Depression. Rogers followed up in January and February 1881 to request a commitment, and Walker accepted in early May. He was formally elected by the MIT Corporation on May 25, 1881, resigning from Yale in June and the 1880 census in November. However, July 1881 assassination attempt on President James A. Garfield and Garfield's ensuing illness and death in September delayed his formal introduction to the MIT faculty until November 5, 1881. On May 30, 1882, during Walker's first commencement exercises, Rogers died mid-speech, where his last words were famously "bituminous coal".

During this era, MIT was in direct financial competition with the Lawrence Scientific School at Harvard University. Given the choice of funding technological research at Harvard, many potential benefactors were indifferent or hostile to the adolescent MIT. In 1870 and 1878, overtures from Harvard president Charles William Eliot for consolidation of the two schools had been rejected or disrupted by Rogers. Despite his tenure at Sheffield, which was analogous to Lawrence, Walker remained committed to MIT's independence from any larger institution. Walker also repeatedly declined overtures from Leland Stanford to become the first president of his new university in Palo Alto, California. As president, Walker continued his census-related activities and began to lecture on political economy.

Several new programs of study were launched under Walker's tenure, including electrical engineering in 1882, chemical engineering in 1888, sanitary engineering in 1889, geology in 1890, and naval architecture in 1893.

=== Aid and campus expansion ===
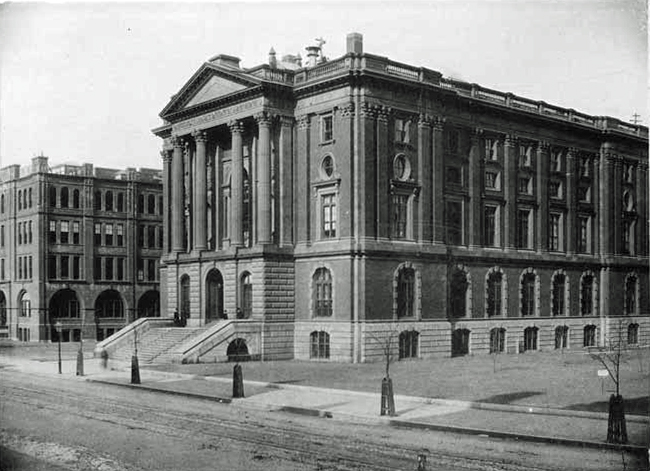
An 1889 photogravure of the two MIT campus buildings in Back Bay; the 1865 building is in the foreground, with the 1883 building in the background

Upon Walker's inauguration in 1881, MIT was located at its original campus in the fashionable and crowded Back Bay neighborhood in Boston. Walker sought to erect a new building to address the increasingly cramped conditions of the original Boylston Street campus. However, the stipulations of the original land grant prevented MIT from covering more than two-ninths of its original lot; Walker announced his intention to build the expansion on a lot directly across from the Trinity Church, fully intending to leverage the expected opposition to achieve favorable terms for the sale of the land and construction elsewhere. With MIT's financial health only beginning to recover, Walker began construction on the expansion with partial funding, expecting the immediacy of the project to serve as a persuasive fundraising tool. The strategy was only partially successful, and the building, which was completed in 1883, had laboratory facilities that were second-to-none but lacked the outward architectural grandeur of its 1865 sister building. It was generally considered an eyesore. Mechanical shops were relocated to the 1883 building to accommodate other programs in the 1865 building. In 1892, the Institute began construction on another Copley Square building.

In light of the difficulties in raising capital for these expansions, Walker and other members of the MIT Corporation lobbied the Massachusetts General Court for a $200,000 grant ($6,106,083 in 2024) to aid the industrial development of the Commonwealth. In 1887, after intensive negotiations in which Walker leveraged his extensive political connections and civic experience, the legislature made a grant of $300,000 (approximately $9.2 million in 2024) over two years. Ultimately, Massachusetts made a total of $1.6 million (approximately $48.8 million in 2024) in grants before the practice was discontinued in 1921.

=== Academic and administrative reforms ===
Walker also set out to reform and expand the institute's organization by creating a smaller Executive Committee, apart from the fifty-member Corporation, to handle regular administrative issues. Walker emphasized the importance of faculty governance by regularly attending their meetings and seeking their advice on major decisions.

At his inauguration, MIT was subject to outside accusations of overwork, poor writing, impractical skills, and a reputation as a "mere" trade school. In response, Walker established a new general course of study (Course IX), emphasizing economics, history, law, English, and modern languages. Course IX was dissolved shortly after Walker's death, and a seventy-year debate followed over the appropriate role and scope of humanistic and social studies at MIT. Graduation requirements changed over the years, but have always included some number of courses in the humanities. Since 1975, all undergraduate students are required to take eight classes distributed across the MIT School of Humanities, Arts, and Social Sciences before receiving their degrees. To address continuing concerns about poor communications skills, a Communication Requirement has been added for two of the classes taken in a designated major to be "communication-intensive", including "substantial instruction and practice in oral presentation".

Walker also sought to improve student life and alumni relations by establishing a gymnasium, dormitories, and the Technology Club, which served to foster a stronger identity and loyalty among the student body, which consisted primarily of commuters. He won considerable praise from the student body by reducing requirements for recitation and preparation, limiting examinations to three hours, expanding entrance examinations to cities outside Boston, starting a summer curriculum, and launching masters and doctoral degree programs. Between Walker's appointment in 1881 and his death in 1897, enrollment quadrupled from 302 to 1,198 students, annual degrees granted increased from 28 to 179, faculty appointments quadrupled from 38 to 156, and the endowment grew thirteenfold from $137,000 (approximately $3.8 million in 2024) to $1.798 million (approximately $58.1 million).

Walker's extensive civic activities as president set a precedent for future presidents to use the post to fulfill civic and cultural obligations throughout Boston. He served as a member of the Massachusetts Board of Education (1882–1890), Boston School Committee (1885–1888), Boston Art Commission (1885–1897), Boston Park Commission (1890–1896), Massachusetts Historical Society (1883–1897), and a trustee of the Boston Public Library in 1896. Walker was committed to a variety of reforms in public and normal schools such as secular curricula, expanding the emphasis on arithmetic, reducing the emphasis on ineffectual home exercises, and increasing the pay and training of teachers.

== Personal life and death ==
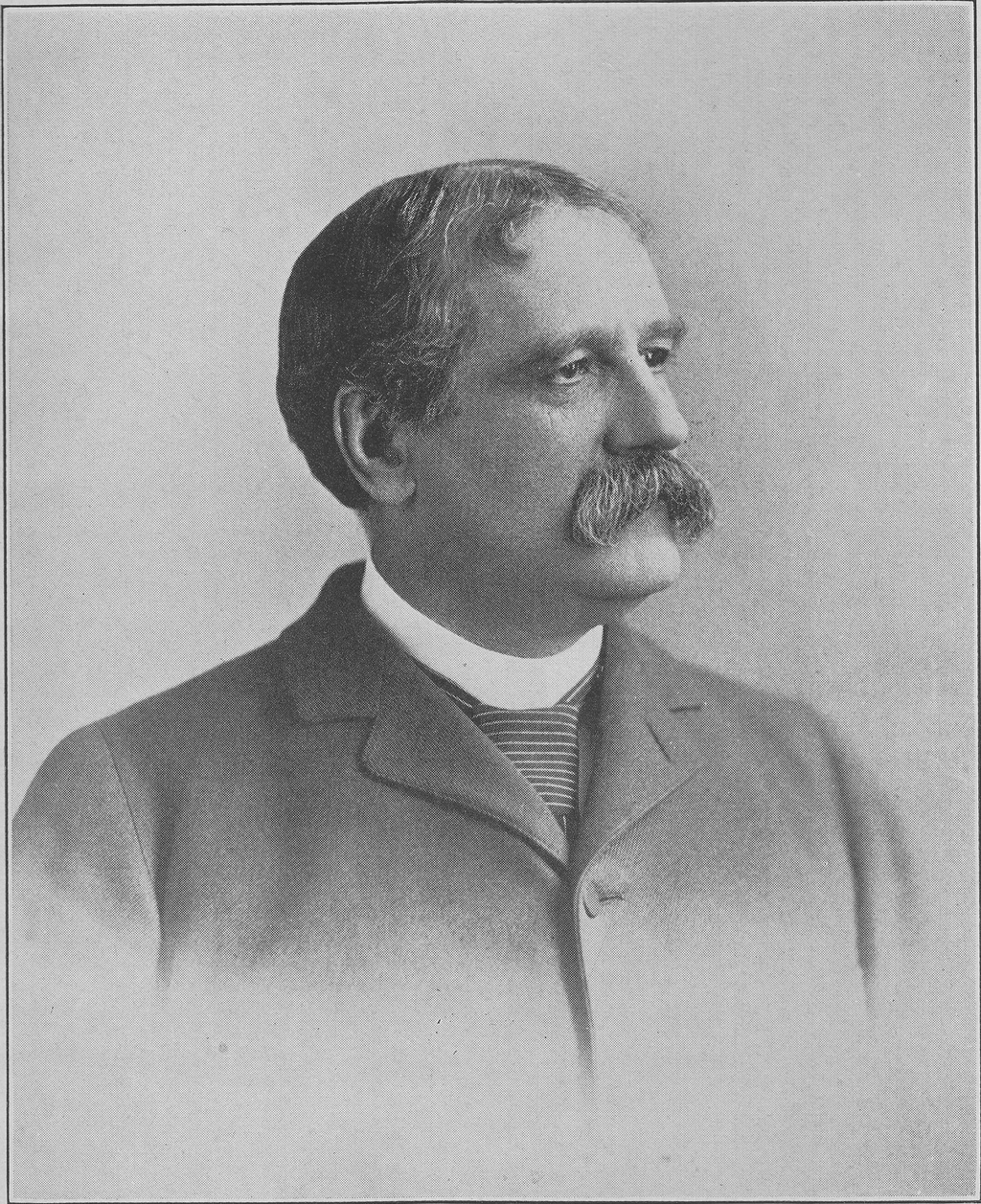
Walker later in life

Walker married Exene Evelyn Stoughton on August 16, 1865 (born October 11, 1840). They had five sons and two daughters together: Stoughton (b. June 3, 1866), Lucy (b. September 1, 1867), Francis (b. 1870–1871), Ambrose (b. December 28, 1870), Eveline (b. 1875–1876), Etheredge (b. 1876–1877), and Stuart (b. 1878–1879). Walker was an avid spectator and supporter of college football and baseball and was a regular Yale enthusiast at the annual Harvard-Yale football game, even during his MIT presidency.

=== Death and burial ===
Following a trip to a dedication in the "wilderness of Northern New York" in December 1896, Walker returned exhausted and ill. He died on January 5, 1897, as a result of apoplexy. His funeral service was conducted at Trinity Church, and Walker was buried at Walnut Grove cemetery in North Brookfield, Massachusetts.

== Legacy ==
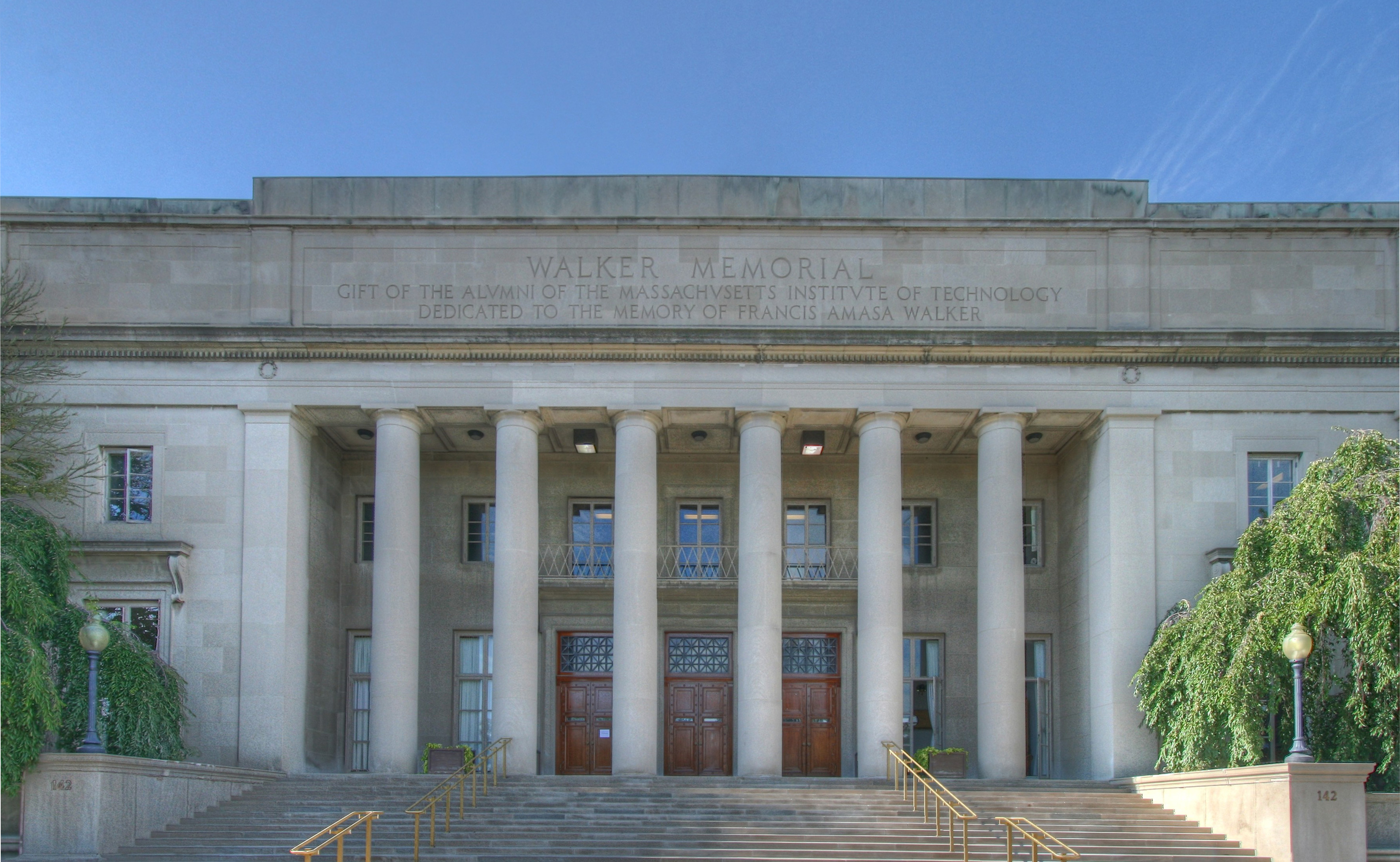
Walker Memorial housed a gymnasium, student lounge, and commons room when it opened in 1916.

Following Walker's death, alumni and students raised funds to construct a monument to him and his fifteen years as president. Although the funds were easily raised, plans were delayed for over two decades as MIT made plans to move to a new campus on the western bank of the Charles River in Cambridge. The new Beaux-Arts campus opened in 1916 and featured a neo-classical Walker Memorial building, housing a gymnasium, students' club and lounge, and a commons room.

Beginning in 1947, the American Economic Association recognized the lifetime achievement of an individual economist with the Francis A. Walker Medal. The quinquennial award was discontinued in 1982 after the creation of the Nobel Memorial Prize in Economic Sciences effectively made it superfluous. The medal was awarded to Wesley Clair Mitchell in 1947, John Maurice Clark in 1952, Frank Knight in 1957, Jacob Viner in 1962, Alvin Hansen in 1967, Theodore Schultz in 1972, and Simon Kuznets in 1977.

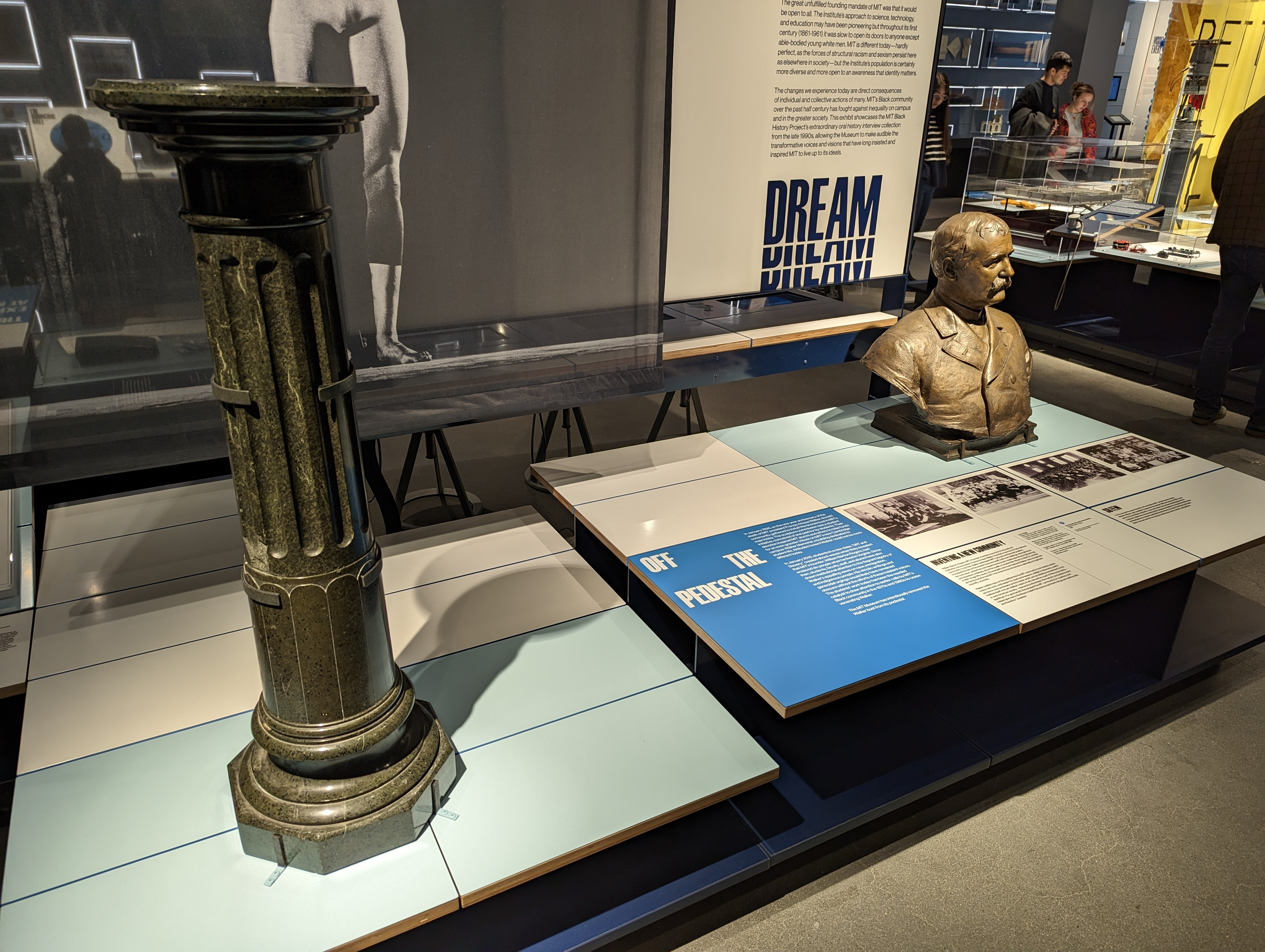
A bust of Walker separated from its pedestal at the MIT Museum.

Walker's reputation declined in the 21st century due to his espousal of racist views in general and on Native Americans in particular. A bronze bust of Walker was removed from its pedestal and relocated to the MIT Museum in 2022, accompanied by a description that describes them as "appalling".

== Principal works ==
- The Indian Question (1874)
- The Wages Question: A treatise on Wages and the Wages Class (1876)
- Money (1878)
- Money in its Relation to Trade and Industry (1879)
- Political Economy (first edition, 1883)
- Land and its Rent (1883)
- History of the Second Army Corps (1886)
- Life of General Hancock (1894)
- The Making of the Nation (1895)
- International Bimetallism (1896)

== See also ==
- List of American Civil War brevet generals (Union)
- List of Massachusetts generals in the American Civil War

Government offices
Preceded by Joseph Camp Griffith Kennedy	Superintendent of the United States Census; 1870	Succeeded by Office disbanded after 1870 Census
Preceded by Office re-established for 1880 Census	Superintendent of the United States Census; 1879 – 1881	Succeeded by Charles W. Seaton
Academic offices
Preceded by John Daniel Runkle	3rd President of the Massachusetts Institute of Technology; 1881 – 1897	Succeeded by James Crafts
