= 1870 United States census =

Ninth US census

- June 1, 1870
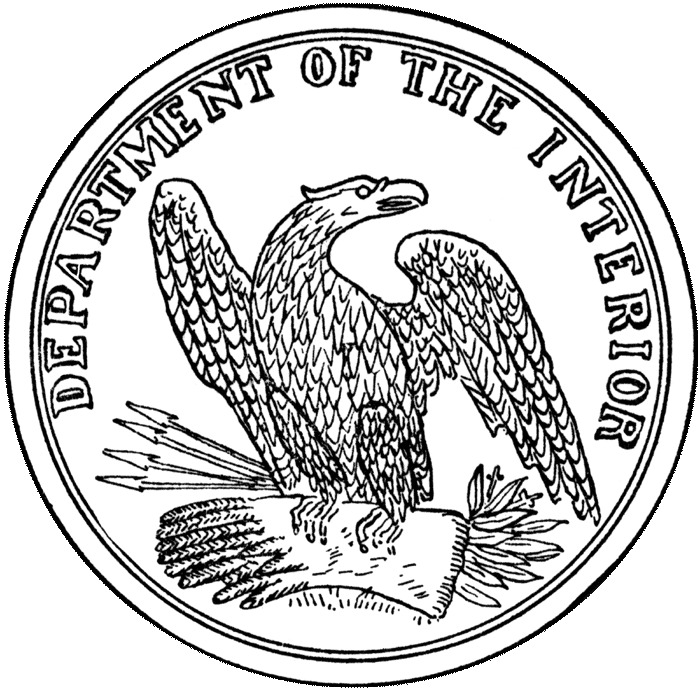
- Seal of the Department of the Interior

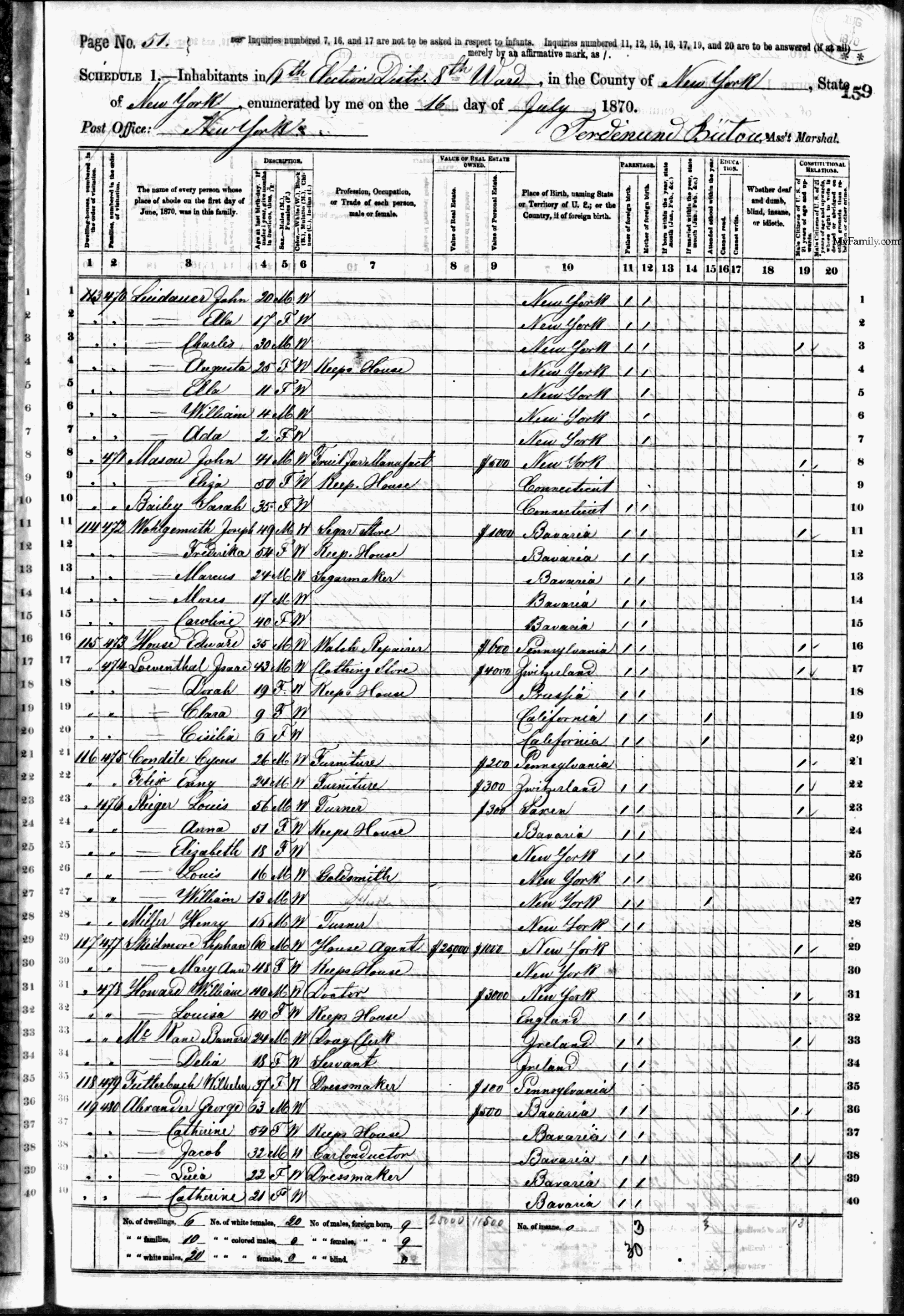
- A page of the 1870 United States census from the state of New York.

General information
- Country: United States
- Authority: Census Office

Results
- Total population: 38,925,598 (▲22.6%)
- Most populous state: New York; 4,382,759
- Least populous state: Nevada; 42,941

The 1870 United States census was the ninth United States census. It was conducted by the Census Office from June 1, 1870, to August 23, 1871. The 1870 census was the first census to provide detailed information on the African American population, only five years after the culmination of the Civil War when slaves were granted freedom. The total population was 38,925,598 with a resident population of 38,558,371 individuals, a 22.6% increase from 1860.

The 1870 census's population estimate was controversial, as many believed it underestimated the true population numbers, especially in New York and Pennsylvania. This was the first census in which all 100 largest cities recorded populations of over 10,000. This was also the last federal census conducted using the US Marshal Service as enumerators.

== Census Act of 1850 ==
The Census Act of 1850 established the primary machinery of the ninth census. The Census Office, working within the Department of the Interior, oversaw the recording and tabulation of results gathered by assistant marshals, who were hired and supervised by federal marshals. Two new structural changes during the 1870 census occurred: marshals had to return the completed population questionnaire to the Census Office in September, and penalties for refusing to reply to enumerator questions were extended to encompass every question on the questionnaires.

== Census organization ==
The commonly past-used slave questionnaires were redesigned to reflect the American society after the Civil War. The five schedules for the 1870 census were the following: General Population, Mortality, Agriculture, Products of Industry, and Social Statistics.

The general population saw a 22.6% increase to 38,555,983 individuals in 1870. Charges of an undercount, however, were brought against Francis Amasa Walker, the Superintendent of the 1870 census.

Mortality rates in 1870, in general, decreased as a fraction of the total population by <0.1% from 1860 and by 0.1% from 1850. The lower death rates indicate that the standard of living increased, due to some exogenous factor, over the period of twenty years from 1850 to 1870.

In terms of products of industry, total U.S. wealth increased by 17.3% from 1860 to 1870, to reach an assessed wealth of $14,178,986,732. The four largest state contributors to this wealth were New York, Massachusetts, Pennsylvania, and Ohio, in that order. Most of the wealth was concentrated in the developed Northeast region, as newer territories like Wyoming were beginning to develop their young economies.

The 1870 census was the first of its kind to record the nativity of the American population. This social statistic helped determine which areas were more highly composed of immigrants than native-born Americans. New York City had the most foreign-born individuals, with 419,094 foreigners, who comprised 44.5% of the city's total population. Philadelphia, Chicago, St. Louis, and San Francisco also had a great population of foreigners that made up a significant fraction of their total populations. Therefore, a great ethnic and cultural change was witnessed from 1860 to 1870, as part of the population growth was due to immigrants moving in and a shuffling of residents across state borders.

== Census results ==
Population results of the 1870 census
True population	Total United States	38,925,598
	States only	38,205,598
	Territories	720,000
Constitutional/resident population*	Total United States	38,558,371
	States only**	38,115,641
	Territories	442,730
White population	Total United States	33,589,377
	States only	33,203,128
	Territories	386,249
Black population	Total United States	4,880,009
	States only	4,835,106
	Territories	44,903
Indian (Native American) population (on reservations)	Total United States	357,981
	States only	89,957
	Territories	268,024
Indian (Native American) population (not on reservations)	Total United States	25,731
	States only	21,228
	Territories	4,503
Chinese population	Total United States	63,199
	States only	56,124
	Territories	7,075
Japanese population	Total United States	55
	States only	55
	Territories	0

*The constitutional population excludes the populations of Native Americans "maintaining their tribal relations and living upon Government reservations" and "the newly acquired district of Alaska."

**When considering congressional apportionment, the total state population of the Constitutional population was used.

== Census questions ==
Schedule 1 of the 1870 census collected the following information:

1. Dwelling-houses numbered in the order of Visitation
2. Families numbered in the order of visitation
3. Names
4. Age
5. Sex
6. Color
7. Profession
8. Value of Real Estate
9. Value of Personal Estate
10. Place of Birth (State, Territory, Country)
11. Father's Birthplace*
12. Mother's Birthplace*
13. If born within the year, state month
14. If married within the year, state month
15. Attended School within the Year (Y/N)
16. Cannot Read (Y/N)
17. Cannot Write (Y/N)
18. Deaf & dumb, blind, insane, idiotic, pauper, or convict
19. Male Citizens of U.S. of 21 years of age or upwards
20. Male Citizens of U.S. of 21 years of age and upwards where rights to vote is denied on grounds other than rebellion or other crime**

*If born in another country

**This question asked if one's right to vote is being denied due to a legal matter other than rebellion or conviction. Such circumstances included being unable to pay poll taxes, or being unable to pass a literacy test.

Full documentation for the 1870 population census, including census forms and enumerator instructions, is available from the Integrated Public Use Microdata Series.

== Population undercount ==
Although Francis Walker, the Superintendent of the 1870 census, defended the quality of the census, arguing that standardized, clear, and statistical approaches and practices were carried out across all regions of the United States, the public at the time was disappointed in the national growth rate and suspected underenumeration. With especially bitter complaints coming from New York and Philadelphia claiming up to a third of the population was not counted, the President made the rare move to order a recount in those areas. While it was thought a large fraction of the population was not counted for being indoors in the wintry cold, newer estimates resulted in only a 2.5% increase in Philadelphia's population and a 2% increase in New York's.

This controversy of the 1870 undercount resurfaced in 1890, when the national growth rate between 1880 and 1890 was discovered to be much lower than it was between 1870 and 1880. Critics then asserted that the 1870 population must have been underenumerated by over 1.2 million people to account for the discrepancy between growth rates; it was presumed that the growth rate in 1880 had to be exaggerated because of the 1870 undercount. Despite the fact that modern investigations have yet to quantify the exact effect of the undercount, most modern social scientists do not believe the undercount was as severe as 1890 investigators assumed. Today most analyzers compare the 1870 undercount to the non-response rates seen in most modern census data.

== State rankings ==
Rank	State/Territory	Population
01	New York	4,382,759
02	Pennsylvania	3,521,951
03	Ohio	2,665,260
04	Illinois	2,539,891
05	Missouri	1,721,295
06	Indiana	1,680,637
07	Massachusetts	1,457,351
08	Kentucky	1,321,011
09	Tennessee	1,258,520
10	Virginia	1,225,163
11	Iowa	1,194,020
12	Georgia	1,184,109
13	Michigan	1,184,059
14	North Carolina	1,071,361
15	Wisconsin	1,054,670
16	Alabama	996,992
17	New Jersey	906,096
18	Mississippi	827,922
19	Texas	818,579
20	Maryland	780,894
21	Louisiana	726,915
22	South Carolina	705,606
23	Maine	626,915
24	California	560,247
25	Connecticut	537,454
26	Arkansas	484,471
27	West Virginia	442,014
28	Minnesota	439,706
29	Kansas	364,399
30	Vermont	330,551
31	New Hampshire	318,300
32	Rhode Island	217,353
33	Florida	187,748
X	District of Columbia (Note: The District of Columbia is not a state but was created with the passage of the Residence Act of 1790.)	131,700
34	Delaware	125,015
35	Nebraska	122,993
X	New Mexico	91,874
36	Oregon	90,923
X	Utah	86,336
37	Nevada	42,941 (Note: Includes a population of 450 for Rio Virgin County, which was located in Nevada but enumerated as part of Utah in the 1870 census.)
X	Colorado	39,864
X	Washington	23,955
X	Montana	20,595
X	Idaho	14,999
X	South Dakota	11,776
X	Arizona	9,658
X	Wyoming	9,118
X	North Dakota	2,405

== City rankings ==
Rank	City	State	Population	Region (2016)
01	New York	New York	942,292	Northeast
02	Philadelphia	Pennsylvania	674,022	Northeast
03	Brooklyn	New York	396,099	Northeast
04	St. Louis	Missouri	310,864	Midwest
05	Chicago	Illinois	298,977	Midwest
06	Baltimore	Maryland	267,354	South
07	Boston	Massachusetts	250,526	Northeast
08	Cincinnati	Ohio	216,239	Midwest
09	New Orleans	Louisiana	191,418	South
10	San Francisco	California	149,473	West
11	Buffalo	New York	117,714	Northeast
12	Washington	District of Columbia	109,199	South
13	Newark	New Jersey	105,059	Northeast
14	Louisville	Kentucky	100,753	South
15	Cleveland	Ohio	92,829	Midwest
16	Pittsburgh	Pennsylvania	86,076	Northeast
17	Jersey City	New Jersey	82,546	Northeast
18	Detroit	Michigan	79,577	Midwest
19	Milwaukee	Wisconsin	71,440	Midwest
20	Albany	New York	69,422	Northeast
21	Providence	Rhode Island	68,904	Northeast
22	Rochester	New York	62,386	Northeast
23	Allegheny	Pennsylvania	53,180	Northeast
24	Richmond	Virginia	51,038	South
25	New Haven	Connecticut	50,840	Northeast
26	Charleston	South Carolina	48,956	South
27	Indianapolis	Indiana	48,244	Midwest
28	Troy	New York	46,465	Northeast
29	Syracuse	New York	43,051	Northeast
30	Worcester	Massachusetts	41,105	Northeast
31	Lowell	Massachusetts	40,928	Northeast
32	Memphis	Tennessee	40,226	South
33	Cambridge	Massachusetts	39,634	Northeast
34	Hartford	Connecticut	37,180	Northeast
35	Scranton	Pennsylvania	35,092	Northeast
36	Reading	Pennsylvania	33,930	Northeast
37	Paterson	New Jersey	33,579	Northeast
38	Kansas City	Missouri	32,260	Midwest
39	Mobile	Alabama	32,034	South
40	Toledo	Ohio	31,584	Midwest
41	Portland	Maine	31,413	Northeast
42	Columbus	Ohio	31,274	Midwest
43	Wilmington	Delaware	30,841	South
44	Dayton	Ohio	30,473	Midwest
45	Lawrence	Massachusetts	28,921	Northeast
46	Utica	New York	28,804	Northeast
47	Charlestown	Massachusetts	28,323	Northeast
48	Savannah	Georgia	28,235	South
49	Lynn	Massachusetts	28,233	Northeast
50	Fall River	Massachusetts	26,766	Northeast
51	Springfield	Massachusetts	26,703	Northeast
52	Nashville	Tennessee	25,865	South
53	Covington	Kentucky	24,505	South
54	Salem	Massachusetts	24,117	Northeast
55	Quincy	Illinois	24,052	Midwest
56	Manchester	New Hampshire	23,536	Northeast
57	Harrisburg	Pennsylvania	23,104	Northeast
58	Trenton	New Jersey	22,874	Northeast
59	Peoria	Illinois	22,849	Midwest
60	Evansville	Indiana	21,830	Midwest
61	Atlanta	Georgia	21,789	South
62	New Bedford	Massachusetts	21,320	Northeast
63	Oswego	New York	20,910	Northeast
64	Elizabeth	New Jersey	20,832	Northeast
65	North Providence	Rhode Island	20,495	Northeast
66	Hoboken	New Jersey	20,297	Northeast
67	Lancaster	Pennsylvania	20,233	Northeast
68	Poughkeepsie	New York	20,080	Northeast
69	Camden	New Jersey	20,045	Northeast
70	Davenport	Iowa	20,038	Midwest
71	Saint Paul	Minnesota	20,030	Midwest
72	Erie	Pennsylvania	19,646	Northeast
73	St. Joseph	Missouri	19,565	Midwest
74	Wheeling	West Virginia	19,280	South
75	Norfolk	Virginia	19,229	South
76	Bridgeport	Connecticut	18,969	Northeast
77	Petersburg	Virginia	18,950	South
78	Taunton	Massachusetts	18,629	Northeast
79	Chelsea	Massachusetts	18,547	Northeast
80	Dubuque	Iowa	18,434	Midwest
81	Bangor	Maine	18,289	Northeast
82	Leavenworth	Kansas	17,873	Midwest
83	Fort Wayne	Indiana	17,718	Midwest
84	Springfield	Illinois	17,364	Midwest
85	Auburn	New York	17,225	Northeast
86	Newburgh	New York	17,014	Northeast
87	Norwich	Connecticut	16,653	Northeast
88	Grand Rapids	Michigan	16,507	Midwest
89	Sacramento	California	16,283	West
90	Terre Haute	Indiana	16,103	Midwest
91	Omaha	Nebraska	16,083	Midwest
92	Williamsport	Pennsylvania	16,030	Northeast
93	Elmira	New York	15,863	Northeast
94	New Albany	Indiana	15,396	Midwest
95	Augusta	Georgia	15,389	South
95	Gloucester	Massachusetts	15,389	Northeast
97	Cohoes	New York	15,357	Northeast
98	Newport	Kentucky	15,087	South
99	New Brunswick	New Jersey	15,058	Northeast
100	Burlington	Iowa	14,930	Midwest
