= Jerome Wiesner =

American science advisor and university president (1915–1994)

- Wiesner (1963) in the White House Rose Garden

13th President of the Massachusetts Institute of Technology
- In office 1971–1980
- Preceded by: Howard Johnson
- Succeeded by: Paul Gray

Director of the Office of Science and Technology
- In office January 20, 1961 – January 24, 1964
- President: John F. Kennedy; Lyndon B. Johnson
- Preceded by: George Kistiakowsky (President's Science Advisory Committee)
- Succeeded by: Donald Hornig

Personal details
- Born: Jerome Bert Wiesner; May 30, 1915 Detroit, Michigan, U.S.
- Died: October 21, 1994 (aged 79) Watertown, Massachusetts, U.S.
- Spouse: Laya Wainger
- Education: University of Michigan (BS, MS, PhD)
- Awards: IEEE Founders Medal (1977); Vannevar Bush Award (1992)
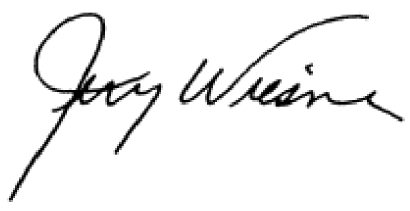
- Signature
- Scientific career
- Fields: Electrical engineering
- Workplaces: Massachusetts Institute of Technology; Los Alamos Laboratory
- Thesis: Pre-ignition phenomena in gas switching tubes and related rectifier burnout problems (1950)

Jerome Bert Wiesner (May 30, 1915 – October 21, 1994) was a professor of electrical engineering, chosen by President John F. Kennedy as chairman of his Science Advisory Committee (PSAC). Educated at the University of Michigan, Wiesner was associate director of the university's radio broadcasting service and provided electronic and acoustical assistance to the National Music Camp at Interlochen, Michigan. During World War II, he worked on microwave radar development at the MIT Radiation Laboratory. He worked briefly after the war at the Los Alamos National Laboratory, then returned to MIT's Research Laboratory of Electronics from 1946 to 1961. After serving as Kennedy's science advisor, he returned to MIT, becoming its president from 1971 to 1980.

He was an outspoken critic of crewed exploration of outer space, believing instead in automated space probes. He challenged NASA's choice of developing the Apollo Lunar Module as a means to achieving Kennedy's goal of landing men on the Moon. At Kennedy's direction, he investigated Rachel Carson's criticism of the use of the pesticide DDT, and issued a report in support of her claims. He was an advocate for arms control, and a critic of anti-ballistic missile defense systems. While MIT president, he was put on President Richard M. Nixon's extended "enemies list".

== Early life and education ==
Wiesner was born in Detroit, Michigan, the son of Jewish immigrants from Silesia, Poland, and raised in Dearborn. He attended Detroit's Fordson High School.

He received a Bachelor of Science (BS) degree in electrical engineering and mathematics in 1937, and a Master of Science (MS) degree in 1938, at the University of Michigan. He received a Doctor of Philosophy (PhD) in electrical engineering from UM in 1950. Interested in radio broadcasting and acoustics, he was associate director of UM's radio broadcasting service. He also participated in studies of acoustics, and assisted in developing electronic techniques, at the National Music Camp at Interlochen, Michigan.

In 1940, Wiesner married Laya Wainger, a fellow mathematics major he met at U. Michigan. The same year, he was appointed chief engineer for the Acoustical and Record Laboratory of the Library of Congress, in which capacity he traveled the American South and Southwest under a Carnegie Corporation grant with folklorist Alan Lomax, recording the folk music of these regions. In this role, he became friends with folk singer Pete Seeger, who performed at the concert for Wiesner's inauguration as President of MIT in 1971.

== Career ==
Wiesner began his professional career at the Massachusetts Institute of Technology, joining the MIT Radiation Laboratory in 1942 and working on microwave radar development. He became an associate member of the laboratory's steering committee, and led "Project Cadillac", which developed the forerunner of the AWAC system.

At the end of World War II, he worked briefly at the Los Alamos National Laboratory, then returned to MIT as a professor of electrical engineering, and worked from 1946 to 1961 at the Research Laboratory of Electronics at MIT (RLE), ultimately becoming the director. Between this time, he is known to have attended the Macy Conferences in 1952, and to have provided feedback alongside Walter Pitts during a presentation on homeostatic systems by Ross Ashby.

=== Kennedy administration ===
President John F. Kennedy named Wiesner to chair the President's Science Advisory Committee (PSAC) in February, 1961.

==== Space program ====
Before Kennedy took office, Wiesner chaired a task force which issued a report to the President-elect on January 10, 1961, warning of "inadequate planning and direction" and "the lack of outstanding scientists and engineers" in its space efforts, and expressing his opposition to crewed space flight, saying that Project Mercury "exaggerated the value of that aspect of space activity where we are less likely to achieve success. We should stop advertising Mercury as our major objective in space activities."

The Wiesner Report, as it was called, outlined to Kennedy Wiesner's advice to not continue with the crewed space program, Project Mercury. The President's Science Advisory Committee highlighted the skepticism of the scientific elite about sending humans into space. Wiesner was not concerned with the political aspects that others in Kennedy's administration were. Wiesner believed that the space program would continue making scientific advancements even without man. Also, he highlighted the disaster that would come out of a failure to place a man into orbit or causing the death of an astronaut, saying it "would create a situation of serious national embarrassment". These two points were among the many reasons Wiesner did not want to send man into space.

When NASA decided in June 1962 on Lunar Orbit Rendezvous as the strategy for its Apollo program to meet Kennedy's goal of landing men on the Moon by the end of the 1960s, Wiesner had created a Space Vehicle Panel, chaired by Nicolas Golovin, to monitor and second-guess NASA. The SVP forced NASA to defend its decision to develop the Saturn V launch vehicle and a Lunar Excursion Module, delaying its announcement news conference to July 11, and causing NASA Administrator James E. Webb to hedge by calling the decision tentative, keeping the Earth-orbit rendezvous and direct-ascent methods as possible backups, but still maintaining, "We find that by adding one vehicle to those already under development, namely, the lunar excursion vehicle, we have an excellent opportunity to accomplish this mission with a shorter time span, with a saving of money, and with equal safety to any other modes."

But Golovin and Wiesner kept up the pressure, Wiesner at one point making the disagreement public during a two-day September visit by the President to Marshall Space Flight Center. Wiesner blurted out "No, that's no good," in front of the press, during a presentation by Marshall Director Wernher von Braun. Webb jumped in and defended von Braun, until Kennedy ended the squabble by stating that the matter was "still subject to final review." Webb held firm, as NASA issued a request for proposal to candidate LEM contractors. Wiesner finally relented, unwilling to settle the dispute once and for all in Kennedy's office, because of the President's involvement with the October Cuban Missile Crisis, and fear of Kennedy's support for Webb. NASA announced the selection of Grumman as the LEM contractor in November 1962.

==== Pesticide usage ====
In the wake of controversy surrounding the 1962 publication of Rachel Carson's Silent Spring, which questioned the indiscriminate use of the pesticide DDT, Kennedy directed the PSAC to conduct an investigation into Carson's claims. Wiesner held hearings, and on May 15, 1963, published a report titled "The Use of Pesticides", which recommended a phaseout of "persistent toxic pesticides."

==== Nuclear arms limitation ====
Wiesner's obituary described him as "a key figure in the Kennedy administration in the establishment of the Arms Control and Disarmament Agency, in achieving the October 1963 Partial Nuclear Test Ban Treaty, and in the successful effort to restrict the deployment of antiballistic missile systems."

=== Return to MIT ===
Shortly before his assassination in November 1963, Kennedy decided to replace Wiesner as PSAC chair with Donald Hornig of Princeton University. As Kennedy's successor, Lyndon B. Johnson honored the appointment in 1964. After leaving the White House, Wiesner returned to MIT as Dean of the School of Science, became Provost in 1966, and served as President from 1971 to 1980. He was also elected a life member of the MIT Corporation.

During the Watergate scandal, it was disclosed in June 1973 that Charles W. Colson, counsel to President Nixon, had prepared a short list of 20 people deemed "hostile to the administration" on September 9, 1971. What became popularly known as "Nixon's enemies list" was discovered to have been expanded to include Wiesner, among twenty other academics. According to an issue of Science reprinted in the Boston Globe and Washington Post, a White House memo discussed a Nixon order to "cut back on MIT's subsidy in view of Wiesner's anti-defense bias".

== Portrayal ==
Wiesner was portrayed by Al Franken in the 1998 HBO miniseries From the Earth to the Moon.

== Awards and honors ==
Wiesner was elected to the American Academy of Arts and Sciences in 1953 and the American Philosophical Society in 1969. He was awarded the Delmer S. Fahrney Award in 1980. In 1993 Wiesner was awarded the Public Welfare Medal from the National Academy of Sciences, of which he was a member.

== Personal life ==
Wiesner died at his home in Watertown, Massachusetts of heart failure at age 79. His son, Stephen Wiesner, made fundamental discoveries in quantum information theory.

== Bibliography (selection) ==
=== Articles ===
- Morrison, Philip; Kosta Tsipis; Jerome Wiesner (February 1994). "The Future of American Defense". Scientific American. 270 (2): 20–27. Bibcode:1994SciAm.270a..20P. doi:10.1038/scientificamerican0194-20.

== Notes ==
1. Obituary, MIT News Office
2. "Lists of White House 'Enemies' and Memorandums Relating to Those Named", The New York Times, June 28, 1973, p. 38.
3. "Enemies list", The Tech (MIT's student newspaper), September 7, 1973, p. 4.
4. A Random Walk through the Twentieth Century, online hyper-biography of Wiesner from 1995

Government offices
Preceded by George Kistiakowsky as Chairman of the President's Science Advisory Committee	Director of the Office of Science and Technology; 1961–1964	Succeeded by Donald Hornig
