= Victor Della-Vos =

Russian educationalist (1829–1890)

Victor Karlovich Della-Vos (1829 – 1890) was a Russian educationalist and proponent of manual training.

Della-Vos graduated from Moscow University in 1853 with a degree in physical and mathematical sciences and soon embarked on his teaching career. In 1858, he went to Paris to study machine tool manufacture. After also visiting London where he studied agricultural machinery he returned to Russia in 1864 to take up the post of professor of mechanics at the Petrovsky Academy. By 1868, he was appointed director of the Moscow Imperial Technical Academy. He became widely known for his combination of both theoretical and practical approaches to education.

Following his participation in the Philadelphia Centennial Exhibition in 1876, his approach was taken up by John Runkle of the Massachusetts Institute of Technology and Calvin Woodward of Washington University in St. Louis. This combination of tool and job analysis provided a basis of what would eventually become Taylorism.
