= Howard Wesley Johnson =

American educator

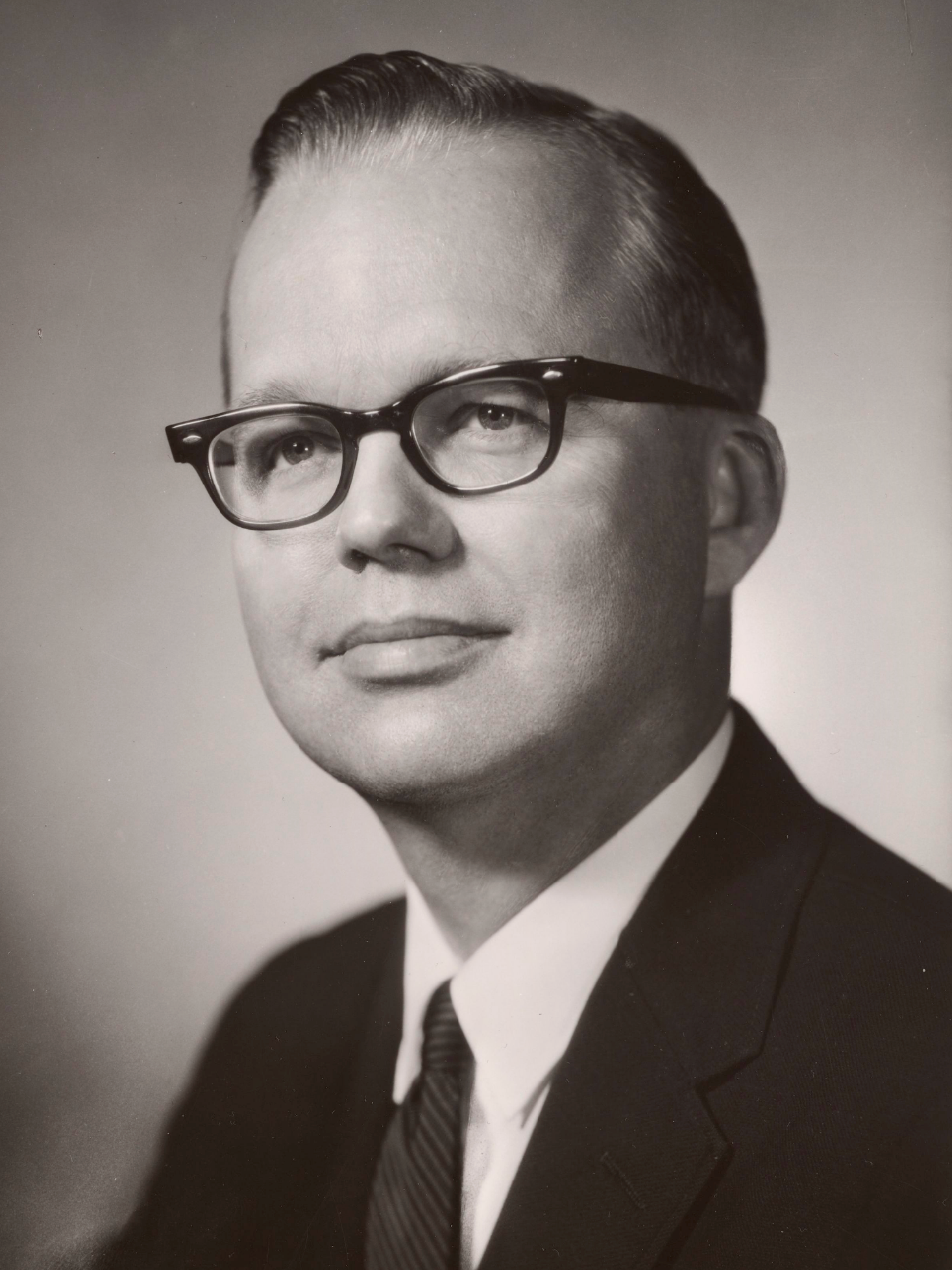

12th President of the Massachusetts Institute of Technology
- In office 1966–1971
- Preceded by: Julius Adams Stratton
- Succeeded by: Jerome Wiesner

Personal details
- Born: July 2, 1922 Chicago, Illinois
- Died: December 12, 2009 (aged 87) Lexington, Massachusetts

Academic background
- Education: Central YMCA College; University of Chicago

Academic work
- Discipline: Business management
- Institutions: Massachusetts Institute of Technology

Howard Wesley Johnson (July 2, 1922 – December 12, 2009) was an American educator. He served as dean of the MIT Sloan School of Management between 1959 and 1966, president of MIT between 1966 and 1971, and chairman of the MIT Corporation (the university's board of trustees) from 1971 to 1983. He was a member of both the American Academy of Arts and Sciences and the American Philosophical Society.

== Early life ==
Howard Johnson was born in Chicago, Illinois, the son of Albert Herman Johnson (1884–1968) and Laura Anna Hansen (1892–1979).

== Education and early career ==
Johnson graduated in 1943 with a bachelor's degree in business from Central College in Chicago. He served in the Army in Europe during World War II, and returned to earn a master's degree in economics at the University of Chicago, where he taught from 1948 to 1955. He joined the MIT faculty as an associate professor of management in 1955.

== Selected works ==
- Holding the Center: Memoirs of a Life in Higher Education, MIT Press, 2001. ISBN 0-262-60044-7

Academic offices
Preceded by Julius Adams Stratton	12th President of the Massachusetts Institute of Technology; 1966 – 1971	Succeeded by Jerome Wiesner
