= John Daniel Runkle =

American educator and mathematician (1822–1902)

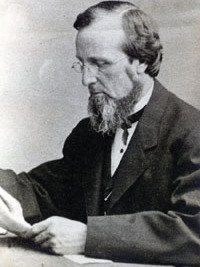

2nd President of the Massachusetts Institute of Technology
- In office 1870–1879
- Preceded by: William Barton Rogers
- Succeeded by: William Barton Rogers

Personal details
- Born: October 11, 1822 Root, New York
- Died: July 8, 1902 (aged 79) Southwest Harbor, Maine
- Education: Lawrence Scientific School of Harvard University, (B.S., 1851)

John Daniel Runkle (October 11, 1822 – July 8, 1902) was an American educator and mathematician. He served as acting president of MIT from 1868 to 1870 and president between 1870 and 1878.

== Biography ==
Professor Runkle was born at Root, New York State. He worked on his father's farm until he was of age, and then studied and taught until he entered the Lawrence Scientific School of Harvard University, where he graduated in 1851. His ability as a mathematician led in 1849 to his appointment as assistant in the preparation of the American Ephemeris and Nautical Almanac, in which he continued to engage until 1884. He was professor of mathematics in the Massachusetts Institute of Technology from 1865 until his retirement in 1902. Runkle become aware of the work of Victor Della-Vos's work in Russia at the Philadelphia Centennial Exhibition in 1876, he was impressed by the combination of theoretical and practical learning. Manual training was introduced into the institute curriculum largely at his instance. He founded the Mathematical Monthly in 1859 and continued its publication until 1861, and he had charge of the astronomical department of the Illustrated Pilgrim's Almanac.

In the town of Brookline, Massachusetts, Runkle was a chairman of the School Committee and an early advocate of mathematics and technical education. He received an LL.D from Wesleyan University, in Middletown, Connecticut

== Works ==
- New Tables for Determining the Values of Coefficients in the Perturbative Function of Planetary Motion (Washington, 1856)
- The Manual Element in Education (1882), reprinted from the Reports of the Massachusetts Board of Education
- Report on Industrial Education (1883)
- Elements of Plane and Solid Analytic Geometry (Boston, 1888)

== Memorials ==
John D. Runkle School, an elementary school located at 50 Druce Street in Brookline, was established in his name in 1897.

== Family ==
His brother, Cornelius A. Runkle (9 December 1832 in Montgomery County, New York–19 March 1888 in New York City) graduated from Harvard Law School in 1855, and began practice in New York City. He was subsequently made deputy collector and given charge of the law division of the New York Custom House. This rendered him familiar with the legal questions involved in tariff and internal revenue litigation, and resulted in his devoting himself largely to that class of business. For about twenty-five years, he acted as counsel for the New York Tribune association. Cornelius's wife, Lucia Isabella Gilbert Runkle (born in North Brookfield, Massachusetts on August 20, 1844), was an editorial writer and contributor to the Tribune.

== Notes ==
Academic offices
Preceded by William Barton Rogers	2nd President of the Massachusetts Institute of Technology; 1870 – 1879	Succeeded by William Barton Rogers
