= Van Ingen =

Van Ingen is a Dutch toponymic surname meaning "from/of Ingen", a town in Gelderland. An archaic spelling is Van Inghen. People with the surname include:

- Ferdinand van Ingen (1933–2021), Dutch Germanist
- Gerrit Jan van Ingen Schenau (1944–1998), Dutch biomechanist, inventor of the clap skate
- Henry Van Ingen (1833–1898) or Hendrik van Ingen, Dutch painter active in the United States
- Herb Van Ingen, Jr. (1924–2010), American ice hockey goaltender
- Marsilius van Inghen (1330s–1396), Dutch Scholastic philosopher
- Wilhelmina van Ingen Elarth (1905–1969), American archaeologist
- Willem van Ingen (1651–1708), Dutch painter active in Italy
- William B. Van Ingen (1858–1955), American stained glass artist and painter

== See also ==
- Van Ingen & Van Ingen, Indian taxidermy company started by Eugene van Ingen (?–1928)
- Ingen (disambiguation)
