= Template =

Template may refer to:

== Tools ==
- Die (manufacturing), used to cut or shape material
- Mold, in a molding process
- Stencil, a pattern or overlay used in graphic arts (drawing, painting, etc.) and sewing to replicate letters, shapes or designs

== Computing ==
- The main document from which mail merge documents are created
- Style sheet (web development) or master page, a sheet or page on which a user can globally edit and format graphic elements and text common to each page of a document
- Template (C++), a tool for generic programming in the C++ language
- Template (file format), a standardized, non-executable file type used by computer software as a pre-formatted example on which to base other files, especially documents
- Template (word processing), a standard document containing layout and styles used to configure electronic word processing documents
- Template metaprogramming, a programming technique used by a compiler to generate temporary source code
- Template method pattern, an object-oriented programming design pattern
- Template processor, a system that combines a template with data to produce an output
- Web template, a master page or a page element that can be used to produce web pages dynamically

== Molecular genetics ==
- A strand of DNA which sets the genetic sequence of new strands during replication
- A strand of RNA which translates genes into proteins

== Other uses ==
- A pre-developed page layout in electronic or paper media used to make new pages with a similar design, pattern, or style
- Boilerplate (text), any text that is or can be reused in new contexts or applications without being greatly changed from the original
- Template (novel), a novel by Matthew Hughes
- Template (racing), a device used in car racing to ensure that the body of the race vehicle adheres to specifications

== See also ==
- Form letter, a letter written from a template
- Template engine (disambiguation)
