= Engine (disambiguation) =

An engine is a device that converts some form of energy into mechanical energy.

Engine may also refer to:

== Thermodynamics ==
- Heat engine, a physical or theoretical device that converts thermal energy to mechanical output
  - Reciprocating engine, a heat engine that uses one or more pistons
- Internal combustion engine, an engine in which the combustion of fuel and an oxidizer occurs in a confined space
  - Diesel engine
  - Wankel engine
  - Pulse jet engine, an internal combustion engine wherein the combustion occurs in pulses
- External combustion engine, an engine where an internal fluid is heated through the engine wall or a heat exchanger
  - Steam engine
- Carnot heat engine, a hypothetical engine that operates on the reversible Carnot cycle
- Stirling engine, a closed-cycle regenerative hot-air engine

== Rail transport ==
- Locomotive, the car of a train that carries the actual engine(s) and pulls/pushes the rest of the train
  - Electric locomotive

== Computing ==
=== Software ===
- Software engine, a core component of a complex software system
  - Browser engine, the web browsers component that renders web pages
    - JavaScript engine, the web browser component that executes a page's JavaScript code
  - Chess engine, for computer chess games
  - Database engine
  - Game engine, for video games
  - Polymorphic engine or mutation engine, a common component of malware
  - Search engine, an Internet service that provides information and links to relevant websites

=== Other ===
- Engine (computer science), a construct providing timed preemption
- Analytical engine, a 19th century design proposed by Charles Babbage for a mechanical computer
- Difference engine, a mechanical calculator designed to tabulate polynomial functions

== Literature ==
- The Engine, a fictional device described in Gulliver's Travels by Jonathan Swift
- Engines (book), a 1959 science book for children by L. Sprague de Camp

== Music ==
- Engine (British band), a British boogie-rock band (1979 to 1997)
- Engine (American band), an American metal band fronted by Ray Alder
  - Engine (Engine album), 1999
- Engine (American Music Club album), 1987
- Engine (Jinn album), 2010
- Engine (Loudness album), 1999
- Engine (TNT album), 2010
- "Engine", a song by Luminous from Luminous in Wonderland, 2022

== Television ==
- Engine (TV series), a Japanese drama starring Takuya Kimura
- Engines (Engine Sentai Go-onger), fictional machines in the TV series Engine Sentai Go-onger

== Other uses ==
- The Engine (organization), an MIT founded nonprofit deep tech ecosystem developer and coworking space operator
- Engine (organization), an American nonprofit organization encouraging high-tech entrepreneurship
- Fire engine, a vehicle used by firefighters
- Siege engine, an anti-fortification machine or structure

== See also ==
- Motor (disambiguation), a device which converts electrical or hydraulic energy into motion
- Fire apparatus, a vehicle used to assist in fighting fires
- ingen (disambiguation)
- NGEN (disambiguation)
- Machine (disambiguation)
- Template engine (disambiguation)
