= NGEN =

NGEN or Ngen or variant, may refer to:

- Ngen, spirits of nature of the Mapuche beliefs.
- Ngen language (Santo), a language found on Vanuatu
- Ngen language (Mande), a language found in the Ivory Coast
- Native Image Generator (NGen) of the .NET Framework
- NGEN Radio, Christian music radio station in Humble, Texas, USA
- Next Generation Enterprise Network (NGEN), U.S. Navy's project to create the NMCI, Navy Marine Corps Intranet
- NGEN computer workstations, made by Convergent Technologies in the 1980s

== See also ==
- Ingen (disambiguation)
- Engine (disambiguation)
