= Daniel Colón-Ramos =

Researcher, Yale University School of Medicine

Daniel A. Colón-Ramos
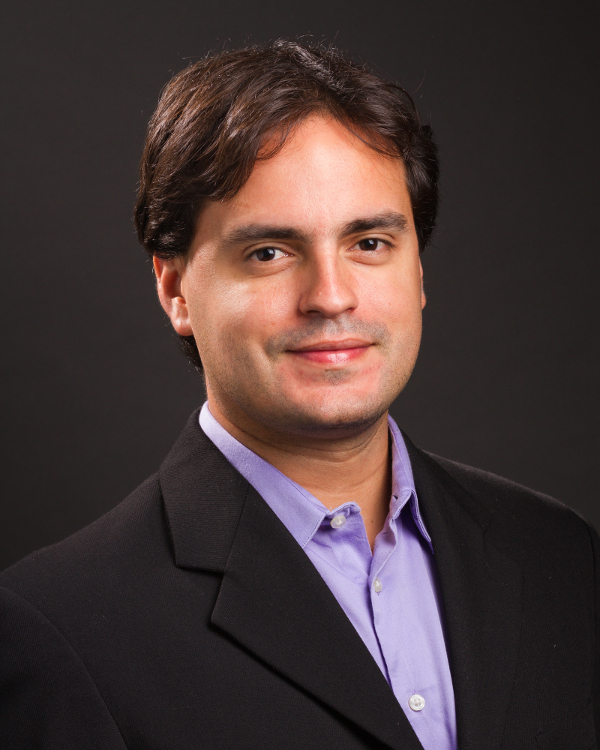
- Born: Hato Rey, Puerto Rico
- Education: Harvard University (BA); Duke University (PhD)
- Awards: NIH Pioneer Award; HHMI Faculty Scholar; AAAS Early Career Award for Public Engagement; Sloan Research Fellow
- Scientific career
- Fields: Neuroscience; Developmental biology Cell biology
- Workplaces: Stanford University; Yale University; Marine Biological Laboratory; University of Puerto Rico
- Thesis: The reaper tales: molecular mechanism of inhibition of translation and induction of apoptosis by a novel family of reaper-like proteins (2003)
- Doctoral advisor: Sally Kornbluth
- Other academic advisors: Kang Shen
- Website: Research website

Daniel Alfonso Colón-Ramos is a Puerto Rican neuroscientist who is the McConnell Duberg Professor of Neuroscience and Cell Biology at the Yale School of Medicine, where his lab studies the cell biology of the synapse during development and learning. He is also the founder of the nonprofit organization Ciencia Puerto Rico (CienciaPR), a collaborative network for people interested in science and Puerto Rico. In 2020, he was named to the National Academy of Medicine.

== Education and early career ==
Colón-Ramos was born and raised in Puerto Rico, growing up between the towns of Guaynabo and Barranquitas. He studied elementary school in Colegio Mater Salvatoris and high school in Colegio San Ignacio de Loyola. He received his Bachelor of Arts degree from Harvard University in 1998. During his undergraduate career, he pursued research projects, such as studying the use of medicinal plants among indigenous Central American communities with the Smithsonian Tropical Research Institute (STRI). He then worked as a research assistant, with the support of an NIH Diversity Supplement, in Mariano García-Blanco's laboratory at Duke University. There, he studied how the architecture of the nucleus of the algae Chlamydomonas reinhardtii changes to affect cytoplasmic events, such as transcript localization. He then stayed at Duke to pursue his PhD in the laboratory of cell biologist Sally Kornbluth. For his doctoral work, Colón-Ramos studied the molecular mechanisms underlying programmed cell death, or apoptosis, and identified a viral family of proteins that induce apoptosis, which are similar to the so-called "Reaper" proteins first identified in fruit flies. He also found that these proteins operate by regulating protein translation, directly binding to the ribosomes—which are the cellular machinery that translate RNA messages into protein products—to alter their assembly. He completed his dissertation "The reaper tales: molecular mechanism of inhibition of translation and induction of apoptosis by a novel family of reaper-like proteins" in 2003.

Following his PhD, Colón-Ramos moved to California in 2004 to pursue a postdoctoral fellowship in neuroscientist Kang Shen's laboratory as a Damon Runyon Cancer Research Foundation fellow, with the additional support of a National Institutes of Health "Pathways to Independence" award. There, he shifted his research focus to studying the developmental neurobiology of the nematode Caenorhabditis elegans. To understand how synapses are established and modified to form memories over the course of the worm's life, he established a system to track synapses over the worms development using cellular markers. Using this system, he found that glial cells provide a roadmap for these connections to be made through the signaling molecule netrin.

== Research ==
In 2008, Colón-Ramos became an assistant professor at Yale University School of Medicine. In 2013, he was promoted to associate professor, and in 2019 to full professor. His research centers on the underlying mechanisms that allow animals to form memories. Specifically, his research group studies how connections between neurons, otherwise known as the synapses, are precisely made to build the right neuronal architecture, how they are maintained and how they are modified to code a particular behavior or memory. To understand how neurons find and connect to each other in the right way, his group uses the nematode worm Caenorhabditis elegans as a model system. His laboratory has developed genetic screens to identify pathways through which synapses are formed, as well as techniques to re-route how pathways are formed by manipulating single cells to track how those changes influence behavior.

In collaboration with William A. Mohler at University of Connecticut Health Center, Zhirong Bao at Sloan Kettering Institute, and Hari Shroff at the National Institute of Biomedical Imaging and Bioengineering, Colón-Ramos has developed a mobile application and collaborative platform called WormGUIDES to act as a systems-level resource to track and detail neuronal connections in the nematode worm. The resource uses a combination of microscopy and single-cell tracking technologies to record the decisions of embryonic neurons of the nematode worm over the course of development. The effort, funded by the National Institutes of Health, aims to catalyze the development of new technologies for advancing neuroscience research, while building a platform for knowledge sharing to build a neurodevelopmental atlas mapping all the nematode cells during development.

In 2018, Colón-Ramos received a "High-Risk, High Reward" grant from the National Institutes of Health to better understand how energy is produced within neurons to power brain functions, which include memory formation and behavior. He holds an appointment at Marine Biological Laboratory and is an adjunct professor at the Instituto de Neurobiología José del Castillo, University of Puerto Rico.

== Science communication and outreach ==
=== Science communication ===
In November 2018, Colón-Ramos participated in a Lasker Foundation-sponsored series called Conversations in Science with journalist Dan Rather, in which he described his research, his path to science from his childhood in Puerto Rico, and his approach to mentoring the next generation of scientists. The series was presented in partnership with iBiology, which was founded by Lasker laureate, biochemist Ronald Vale. He has also spoken on the importance of basic research at TEDxSanJuan and on Connecticut Public Radio.

=== Ciencia Puerto Rico ===
In 2006, during his postdoctoral fellowship at Stanford University, Colón-Ramos founded Ciencia Puerto Rico (CienciaPR) to connect Puerto Rican scientists across the diaspora to promote scholarly interaction, provide visibility for Puerto Rican scientists, and support research and education in Puerto Rico. The project began first as a database and has since grown into a nonprofit organization, now led by Executive Director Giovanna Guerrero-Medina. In 2011, Colón-Ramos received the American Association for the Advancement of Science Early Career Award for Public Engagement with Science in part because of his work with CienciaPR and with promoting culturally relevant science education. In 2015, the Yale Ciencia Initiative was launched using CienciaPR as a model to encourage students from Latino backgrounds at Yale and beyond to study science.

Colón-Ramos has also authored op-eds advocating for the place of rigorous science in policy in Puerto Rico, for instance, criticizing the flawed scientific findings generated by the Agency for Toxic Substances and Disease Registry, which is tasked with evaluating the effect of pollutants on population health at Superfund sites like one found in Vieques, Puerto Rico. In 2013, he wrote about the lack of accountability and necessary public health interventions in Vieques, whose residents suffer from poor health outcomes due to military contamination with pollutants like mercury and napalm. Also in 2013, he and collaborator Guerrero-Medina authored an op-ed for PBS about a Puerto Rican Supreme Court ruling against the right of a lesbian couple to adopt a child. The ruling cited that homosexual behavior was "unnatural;" the op-ed argued against this idea, using scientific evidence to support LGBT rights. Together with the Mexican-American surgeon and researcher Alfredo Quiñones-Hinojosa, he also wrote an op-ed for The New York Times about the role racism and discrimination continues to play in science education.

== Awards and honors ==
- Elected Member, National Academy of Medicine, 2020
- NIH Pioneer Award, 2018
- NINDS Landis Award for Outstanding Mentorship, 2018
- Howard Hughes Medical Institute Faculty Scholar, 2016
- E. E. Just Lecture Award, American Society for Cell Biology, 2016
- Early Career Award for Public Engagement with Science, American Association for the Advancement of Science, 2011
- Sloan Research Fellow, 2010
- Klingenstein Fellowship Award in the Neurosciences, 2009
