= L. Rafael Reif =

Venezuela American academic administrator (born 1950)

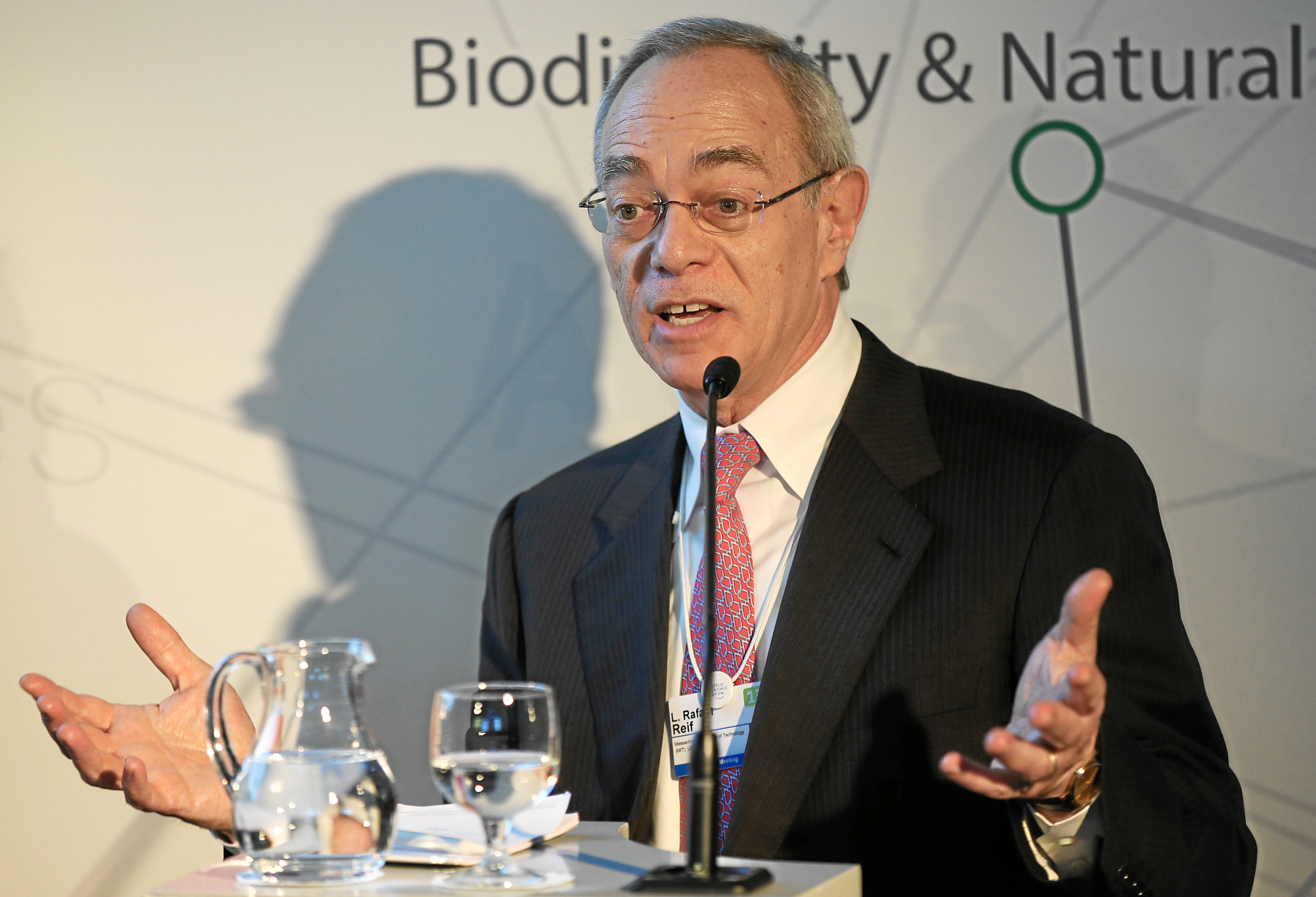
- Reif during the WEF 2013

17th President of the Massachusetts Institute of Technology
- In office July 2, 2012 – December 31, 2022
- Preceded by: Susan Hockfield
- Succeeded by: Sally Kornbluth

Personal details
- Born: Leo Rafael Reif Groisman; August 21, 1950 (age 76) Maracaibo, Venezuela
- Spouse: Christine Chomiuk
- Children: Jessica and Blake
- Education: Universidad de Carabobo (BS); Stanford University (PhD)
- Scientific career
- Fields: Electrical engineering
- Workplaces: Massachusetts Institute of Technology
- Thesis: Doping process in silicon epitaxy: Transfer function and physicochemical model (1979)
- Doctoral advisor: James D. Meindl

Leo Rafael Reif (born August 21, 1950) is a Venezuelan American electrical engineer and academic administrator. He previously served as the 17th president of the Massachusetts Institute of Technology from 2012 to 2022, provost of the institute from 2005 to 2012, and head of the institute's EECS department from 2004 to 2005.

Reif sits on the boards of the World Economic Forum, the Carnegie Endowment, the Council on Foreign Relations, and the Broad Institute.

== Early life and education ==
Leo Rafael Reif was born in Maracaibo, Venezuela, to Eastern European Jewish parents who immigrated to Venezuela in the late 1930s through Ecuador and Colombia. His father was a photographer, and the family spoke Yiddish and Spanish at home.

Reif received an undergraduate degree in electrical engineering from the University of Carabobo in Valencia, Venezuela in 1973 and spent the next year as an assistant professor at the Universidad Simón Bolívar in Caracas. He earned a PhD electrical engineering from Stanford University in 1979 and then spent a year as a visiting assistant professor in the Department of Electrical Engineering at Stanford.

== Career ==
Reif joined MIT in January 1980 as an assistant professor of electrical engineering. He was promoted to associate professor in 1983, received tenure in 1985, and was promoted to full professor in 1988. In 2004, he was named the Fariborz Maseeh Professor of Emerging Technology. His research centered on three-dimensional integrated circuit technologies and on environmentally benign semiconductor device fabrication. Reif was director of MIT's Microsystems Technology Laboratories, then associate department head for Electrical Engineering in the Department of Electrical Engineering and Computer Science, and EECS department head from 2004 to 2005.

As MIT's provost from 2005 to 2012, Reif promoted online learning for students both inside and outside MIT. The effort led to the creation of edX, a massive open online course founded by MIT and Harvard University in 2012.

In 2012, Reif was elected president of MIT, succeeding Susan Hockfield. In 2013, Reif was named co-chair of the Obama administration's Advanced Manufacturing Partnership Steering Committee "2.0."

To promote innovation in "tough-tech" science and engineering fields, in 2015 he presented an idea for an "innovation orchard" to provide space, mentorship, and bridge-funding for entrepreneurs to commercialize new science. The idea led to the creation of The Engine.

Beginning in 2017, Reif began to describe what he saw as a need for education combining expertise in computing and other fields. In a 2019 Financial Times op-ed, he coined the term "AI bilingual." In 2018, Reif announced the creation of the MIT Schwarzman College of Computing. The College aims to prepare students to harness the power of AI while weighing its ethical and social implications.

In January 2021, Reif defended Gang Chen in an open letter following Chen's arrest by the Federal Bureau of Investigation on wire fraud and tax violation charges.

In February 2022, Reif announced his intention to step down as MIT president at the end of 2022, and return to the faculty of the Department of Electrical Engineering and Computer Science following a yearlong sabbatical.

=== Corporate affiliations ===
From 2007 to January 2019, Reif served on the Board of Directors of Schlumberger, where he was on the Nominating and Governance Committee and the Science and Technology Committee and currently owns approximately $1,000,000 in stock. He was also a member of the Board of Conservation International, a nonprofit focused on sustainability and the environment.

Reif served on the Board of Directors of Alcoa from 2015-2016 and its public spin-off Arconic from 2016–2017.

Reif was elected to the Board of Directors of TSMC in 2021 and serves as an independent director.

== Recognition ==
Reif is a fellow of the Institute for Electrical and Electronic Engineers, an elected member of the American Academy of Arts & Sciences, and a member of Tau Beta Pi and the Electrochemical Society. The Semiconductor Research Corporation (SRC) awarded him the 2000 Aristotle Award for "his commitment to the educational experience of SRC students and the profound and continuing impact he has had on their professional careers." For his work in developing edX and MITx, launched in December 2011, he received the 2012 Tribeca Disruptive Innovation Award. In 2015, the Woodrow Wilson National Fellowship Foundation honored him with the Frank E. Taplin, Jr. Public Intellectual Award, he was recognized as one of the Top 20 Most Influential, Outstanding, Creative and Talented Hispanic professionals working in the US Technology Industry by @CNET @CNET-ES @CBS Interactive. and elected a member of the National Academy of Engineering. In November 2017, Reif was elected a foreign member of the Chinese Academy of Engineering.

== Controversies ==
=== Handling of scientific fraud allegations ===
In 2006, as MIT's provost, Reif was responsible for coordinating an investigation by the United States Department of Defense into allegations of scientific and financial fraud in an MIT Lincoln Laboratory study of a missile defense system, which were initially brought forward by Theodore Postol. Following the investigation, Reif determined that no academic misconduct took place, though Postol alleged that the MIT administration had intentionally hampered the investigation.

=== Aaron Swartz case ===
The Reif administration at MIT played an important role in the prosecution of Aaron Swartz, the founder of RSS and co-founder of Reddit, who was renowned for his anti-copyright (and "knowledge for all") activism on MIT campus.

=== Stephen Schwarzman funding protests ===
After the announcement of the Schwarzman College of Computing in 2019, some students and members of the MIT community criticized Reif's decision to accept funding from Stephen Schwarzman over his ties to Donald Trump and opposition to an affordable housing bill in California. During the opening ceremony for the Scharzman College of Computing, a group of roughly 150 to 300 students protested both outside the ceremony and next to Reif's office.

=== MIT ties to Saudi Arabia ===
In 2018 and 2019, following the assassination of Jamal Khashoggi, Reif ordered a report led by Richard K. Lester into all ties between MIT and the government of Saudi Arabia. After the completion of the report, Reif published an open letter which was highly critical of the Saudi government. However, Reif did not recommend dissolution of partnerships between MIT and Saudi institutions, citing concerns about donations from private foundations in Saudi Arabia and academic freedom for partnerships handled by individual faculty members.

=== Donations to MIT from Jeffrey Epstein ===
In 2019, in the wake of Jeffrey Epstein's indictment on child sex trafficking and subsequent suicide, it came to light that Epstein had contributed over $800,000 to MIT, much of it beginning in 2013 after he was initially convicted of child sex trafficking. In August 2019, Reif ordered an investigation by law firm Goodwin Procter into Epstein's connections with the university.

In a September 12, 2019 letter to the MIT community on the institute's website, Reif admitted he signed a 2012 thank you letter to Epstein for a gift to professor Seth Lloyd. In the open letter to the community, Reif said, "I apparently signed this letter on August 16, 2012, about six weeks into my presidency. Although I do not recall it, it does bear my signature." On September 18, he explained, "Many students have asked how I could have signed that acknowledgment letter without asking questions and how I could fail to remember it. The answer is simple: I did not recognize the name, and I sign many standard thank-you letters every week. That includes several hundred letters every year thanking individuals for contributions to the Institute."

In October 2019, Reif held a forum for the MIT community to discuss their concerns regarding MIT's ties to Epstein. Controversy continued even after the forum, including calls among the undergraduate student community for both Reif and Lloyd to resign from MIT.

In January 2020, a report from the investigation determined that Epstein had made a donation to Marvin Minsky in 2002, several donations to the MIT Media Lab, facilitated by Joi Ito, Joscha Bach, and Neri Oxman, and three donations to Seth Lloyd. Three MIT vice presidents were determined to have known of Epstein's conviction, but the report concluded that Reif did not play a role in approving the donations. Following the release of the report, Reif placed Lloyd on temporary paid administrative leave until a decision by a further review panel could be made.

In February 2020, Reif announced that MIT would donate $850,000 to four nonprofits that support survivors of sexual abuse.

== Personal life ==
Reif and his wife, Christine (Chomiuk), live in Newton, Massachusetts. They have a daughter, Jessica, and a son, Blake. Jessica is Dr. Reif's daughter from his first marriage.

Academic offices
Preceded by Susan Hockfield	17th President of the Massachusetts Institute of Technology; 2012 – 2022	Succeeded by Sally Kornbluth
