= Peter Lange =

Peter Lange may refer to:

- Peter Lange (ceramicist) (born 1944), New Zealand ceramicist
- Peter Lange (academic), American academic and provost of Duke University

== See also ==
- Peter de Lange (disambiguation)
- Peter Lang (disambiguation)
- Peter Lange-Müller, Danish composer and pianist
