= Treaty =

Express agreement between nations under international law

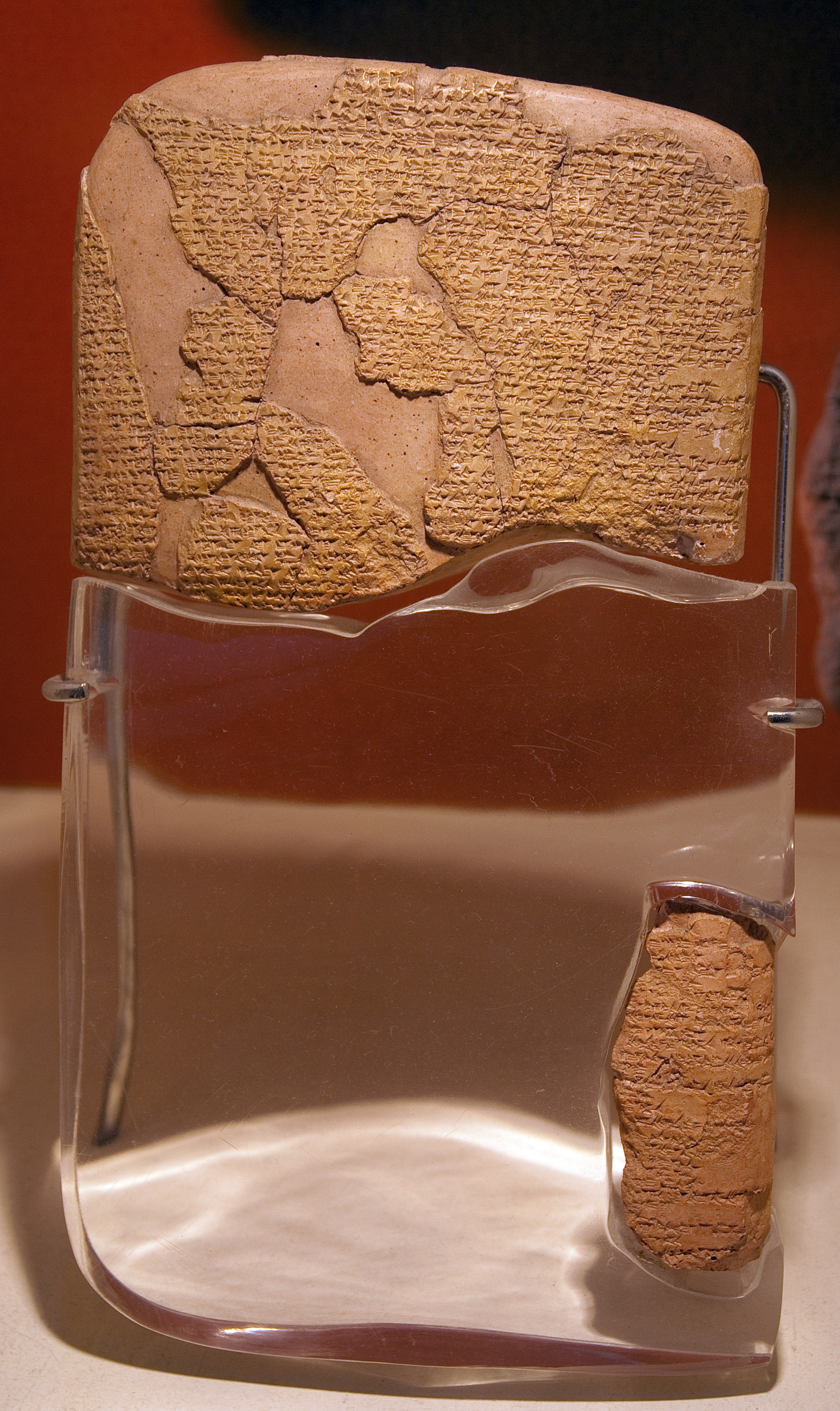
The Egyptian–Hittite peace treaty, on display at the Istanbul Archaeology Museum, one of the earliest examples of a written international agreement.

A treaty is an international agreement between sovereign states or other subjects of international law (including international organizations) that is governed by international law. A treaty may also be known as an international agreement, protocol, covenant, convention, pact, or exchange of letters, among other terms; however, only documents that are legally binding on the parties are considered treaties under international law. Treaties may be bilateral (between two parties) or multilateral (involving more than two parties).

International agreements were used in some form by most major civilizations and became increasingly common and more sophisticated during the early modern era. The early 19th century saw developments in diplomacy, foreign policy, and international law reflected by the widespread use of treaties. In the 20th century, the Vienna Convention on the Law of Treaties (VCLT) codified these practices by establishing rules for creating, amending, interpreting, and terminating treaties; and for resolving disputes and alleged breaches.

Treaties serve as primary sources of international law and have codified or established many international legal principles since the early 20th century. They are only binding on the parties that have signed and ratified them. In certain conditions a treaty may also be invalidated and thus rendered unenforceable, for example, if it violates a peremptory norm (jus cogens) such as permitting a war of aggression or crimes against humanity.

Treaties are not required to follow any standard form and differ widely in substance and complexity. They are applied to wide range of subject matters such as security, trade, environment, and human rights. Treaties are also used to establish governance frameworks for international institutions such as the International Criminal Court and the United Nations.

== Governance of treaties under international law ==
=== Role of the United Nations ===
The United Nations has extensive power to convene states to enact large-scale multilateral treaties and has experience doing so. Under the United Nations Charter, which is itself a treaty, treaties must be registered with the UN to be invoked before it, or enforced in its judiciary organ, the International Court of Justice. This was done to prevent the practice of secret treaties, which proliferated in the 19th and 20th centuries and often precipitated or exacerbated conflict. Article 103 of the Charter also states that its members' obligations under the Charter outweigh any competing obligations under other treaties.

After their adoption, treaties, as well as their amendments, must follow the official legal procedures of the United Nations, as applied by the Office of Legal Affairs, including signature, ratification and entry into force.

=== Vienna Convention on the Law of Treaties ===
The Vienna Convention on the Law of Treaties (VCLT) is an international agreement governing treaties between states. Its provisions cover the lifecycle of treaties including how they are negotiated, interpreted, amended and terminated. It also contains provisions governing the resolution of disputes and alleged breaches.

The VCLT was originally drafted by the International Law Commission, and was adopted on 22 May 1969. In entered into force on 27 January 1980 and, as at May 2026, has been ratified by 119 countries Non-ratifying parties, such as the United States, have recognized parts of the VCLT as restating customary international law.

== Treaty forms ==
=== Types of treaties ===
==== Bilateral and multilateral treaties ====
Bilateral treaties are concluded between two states or entities. It is possible for a bilateral treaty to have more than two parties; for example, each of the bilateral treaties between Switzerland and the European Union (EU) has seventeen parties: The parties are divided into two groups, the Swiss ("on the one part") and the EU and its member states ("on the other part"). The treaty establishes rights and obligations between the Swiss and the EU and the member states severally—it does not establish any rights and obligations amongst the EU and its member states.

A multilateral treaty is concluded among several countries, establishing rights and obligations between each party and every other party. Multilateral treaties may be regional or may involve states across the world. Treaties of "mutual guarantee" are international compacts, e.g., the Treaty of Locarno which guarantees each signatory against attack from another.

==== Non-binding agreements ====
Signing a treaty implies a recognition that the other side is a sovereign state and that the agreement being considered is enforceable under international law. Hence, states can be very careful about describing an agreement with another party as a treaty. For example, within the United States, agreements between states are compacts and agreements between states and the federal government or between agencies of the government are memoranda of understanding.

Another situation can occur when one party wishes to create an obligation under international law, but the other party does not. This factor has been at work with respect to discussions between North Korea and the United States over security guarantees and nuclear proliferation.

=== Treaty structure ===
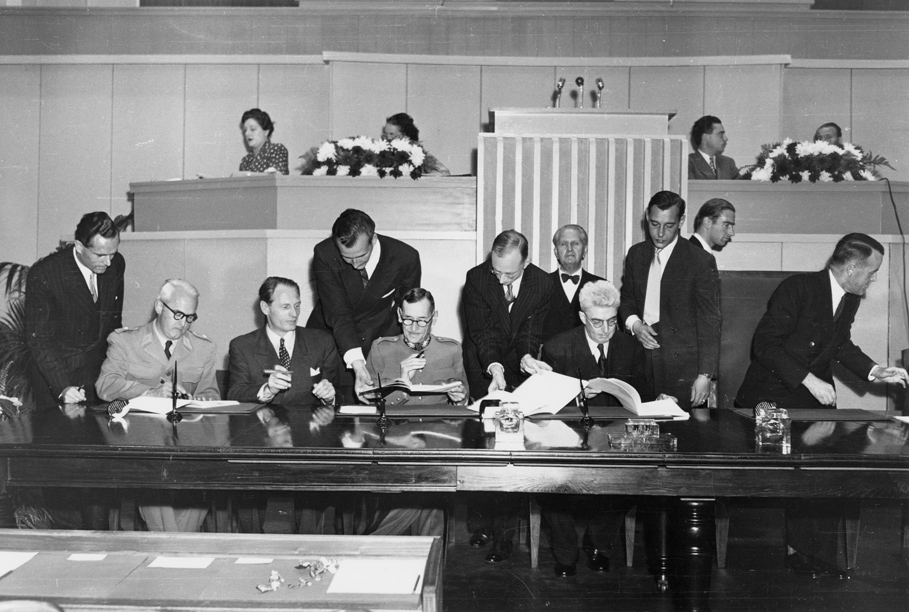
The signing of the Geneva Conventions in 1949. A country's signature, through plenipotentiaries with "full power" to conclude a treaty, is often sufficient to manifest an intention to be bound by the treaty.

There is no prescribed form that a treaty must take to have binding effect. However, since the late 19th century, most treaties have followed a fairly consistent format. A treaty typically begins with a preamble describing the "High Contracting Parties" and their shared objectives in executing the treaty, as well as summarizing any underlying events (such as the aftermath of a war in the case of a peace treaty). In the Geneva Conventions, the term "High Contracting Parties" refers to the states that have joined the conventions and are therefore bound to uphold them. Modern preambles are sometimes structured as a single very long sentence formatted into multiple paragraphs for readability, in which each of the paragraphs begins with a gerund (desiring, recognizing, having, etc.).

The High Contracting Parties—referred to as either the official title of the head of state (but not including the personal name), e.g. His Majesty The King of X or His Excellency The President of Y, or alternatively in the form of "Government of Z"—are enumerated, along with the full names and titles of their plenipotentiary representatives; a boilerplate clause describes how each party's representatives have communicated (or exchanged) their "full powers" (i.e., the official documents appointing them to act on behalf of their respective high contracting party) and found them in good or proper form. However, under the Vienna Convention on the Law of Treaties if the representative is the head of state, head of government or minister of foreign affairs, no special document is needed, as holding such high office is sufficient.

The end of the preamble and the start of the actual agreement is often signaled by the words "have agreed as follows".

After the preamble comes numbered articles, which contain the substance of the parties' actual agreement. Each article heading usually encompasses a paragraph. A long treaty may further group articles under chapter headings.

Modern treaties, regardless of subject matter, usually contain articles governing where the final authentic copies of the treaty will be deposited and how any subsequent disputes as to their interpretation will be peacefully resolved.

The end of a treaty, the eschatocol (or closing protocol), is often signaled by language such as "in witness whereof" or "in faith whereof", followed by the words "DONE at", then the site(s) of the treaty's execution and the date(s) of its execution. The date is typically written in its most formal, non-numerical form; for example, the Charter of the United Nations reads "DONE at the city of San Francisco the twenty-sixth day of June, one thousand nine hundred and forty-five". If applicable, a treaty will note that it is executed in multiple copies in different languages, with a stipulation that the versions in different languages are equally authentic.

The signatures of the parties' representatives follow at the very end. When the text of a treaty is later reprinted, such as in a collection of treaties currently in effect, an editor will often append the dates on which the respective parties ratified the treaty and on which it came into effect for each party.

== Formation ==
=== Consent to be bound ===
A state must express its consent to be bound to a treaty, for example, through signature, ratification, acceptance, approval or accession.

==== Signature ====
A signature can serve two different functions in treaty negotiations. If a state's representative has been authorised in advance, their signature can express consent and immediately bind the state as a legal party. More commonly, however, a signature will serve to authenticate the text of the treaty but consent to be bound will be subject to future ratification.

==== Ratification, acceptance or approval ====
Ratification is process through which a country expresses its consent to be bound to a treaty's provisions by implementing them domestically, for example, through legislation or executive order. This provides a deliberate gap between when a treaty is negotiated and signed, and when it is enacted into domestic law.

Where a treaty states that it will be enacted through ratification, acceptance or approval, the parties must sign to indicate acceptance of the wording but there is no requirement on a state to later ratify the treaty, although they may still be subject to certain obligations. In some jurisdictions, such as the United States, a treaty is defined specifically as an international agreement that has been ratified, and thus made binding per the procedures established under domestic law.

Multilateral treaties will often delay entry into force until a minimum number of signatories have ratified the treaty.

=== Reservations ===
Reservations are essentially caveats to a state's acceptance of a treaty. A state can make a reservation in the form of a unilateral statement to exclude or to modify the legal obligation and its effects on the reserving state. These must be included at the time of signing or ratification; a party cannot add a reservation after it has already joined a treaty. Reservations can have one of three effects: the reserving state is bound by the treaty but the effects of the relevant provisions are precluded or changed, the reserving state is bound by the treaty but not the relevant provisions, or the reserving state is not bound by the treaty.

Originally, international law was unaccepting of treaty reservations, rejecting them unless all parties to the treaty accepted the same reservations. However, in the interest of encouraging the largest number of states to join treaties, a more permissive rule regarding reservations has emerged. While some treaties still expressly forbid any reservations, they are now generally permitted to the extent that they are not inconsistent with the goals and purposes of the treaty.

When a state limits its treaty obligations through reservations, other states party to that treaty have the option to accept those reservations, object to them, or object and oppose them. If the state accepts them (or fails to act at all), both the reserving state and the accepting state are relieved of the relevant obligation in their relations with each other (accepting the reservation does not change the accepting state's legal obligations as concerns other parties to the treaty). If the state opposes, the parts of the treaty affected by the reservation drop out completely and no longer create any legal obligations on the reserving and accepting state, again only as concerns each other. Finally, if the state objects and opposes, there are no legal obligations under that treaty between those two state parties whatsoever. The objecting and opposing state essentially refuses to acknowledge the reserving state is a party to the treaty at all.

=== Interpretive declarations ===
An interpretive declaration is a separate process, where a state issues a unilateral statement to specify or clarify a treaty provision. This can affect the interpretation of the treaty but it is generally not legally binding. A state is also able to issue a conditional declaration stating that it will consent to a given treaty only on the condition of a particular provision or interpretation.

== Execution and implementation ==
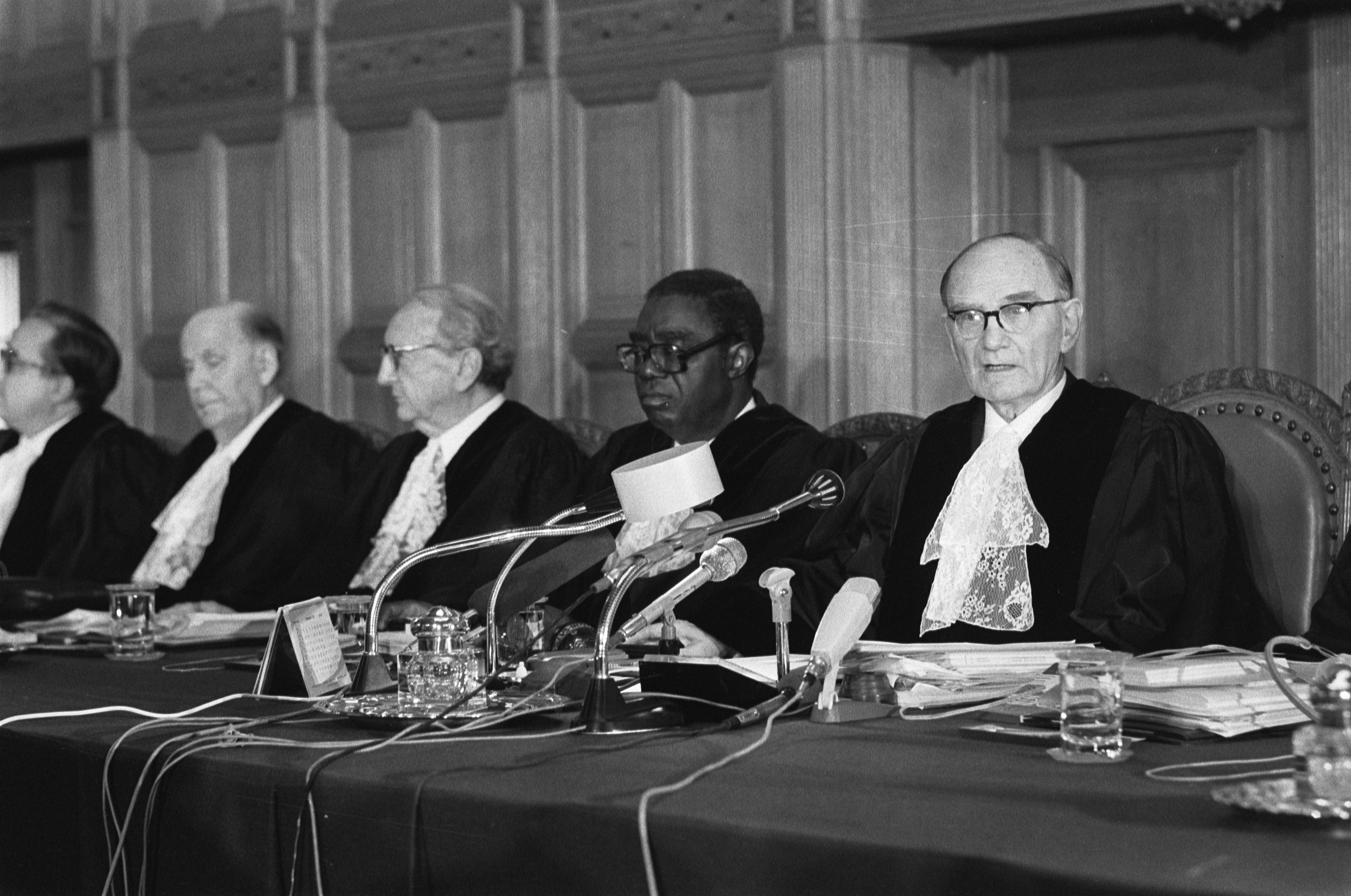
The International Court of Justice is often called upon to aid in the interpretation or implementation of treaties.

=== Self-executing and non-self-executing treaties ===
Treaties may be seen as "self-executing", in that merely becoming a party puts the treaty and all its obligations in action. Other treaties may be non-self-executing and require "implementing legislation"—a change in the domestic law of a state party that will direct or enable it to fulfill treaty obligations. An example of a treaty requiring such legislation would be one mandating local prosecution by a party for particular crimes.

The division between the two is often unclear and subject to disagreements within a government, since a non-self-executing treaty cannot be acted on without the proper change in domestic law; if a treaty requires implementing legislation, a state may default on its obligations due to its legislature failing to pass the necessary domestic laws.

=== Interpretation ===
The language of treaties, like that of any law or contract, must be interpreted when the wording does not seem clear, or it is not immediately apparent how it should be applied in a perhaps unforeseen circumstance. The VCLT states that a treaty "shall be interpreted in good faith in accordance with the ordinary meaning to be given to the terms of the treaty in their context and in the light of its object and purpose". This represents a compromise between three theories of interpretation: the textual approach which looks to the ordinary meaning of the text, the subjective approach which considers factors such as the drafters' intention, and the teleological approach which interprets a treaty according to its objective and purpose. International legal experts also often invoke the "principle of maximum effectiveness", which interprets treaty language as having the fullest force and effect possible to establish obligations between the parties.

No one party to a treaty can impose its particular interpretation of the treaty upon the other parties. Consent may be implied, however, if the other parties fail to explicitly disavow that initially unilateral interpretation, particularly if that state has acted upon its view of the treaty without complaint. Consent by all parties to the treaty to a particular interpretation has the legal effect of adding another clause to the treaty – this is commonly called an "authentic interpretation".

International tribunals and arbiters are often called upon to resolve substantial disputes over treaty interpretations. To establish the meaning in context, these judicial bodies may review the preparatory work from the negotiation and drafting of the treaty as well as the final, signed treaty itself.

== Enforcement ==
While the Vienna Convention provides a general dispute resolution mechanism, many treaties specify a process outside the convention for arbitrating disputes and alleged breaches. This may be a specially convened panel, by reference to an existing court or panel established for the purpose such as the International Court of Justice, the European Court of Justice or processes such as the Dispute Settlement Understanding of the World Trade Organization. Depending on the treaty, such a process may result in financial penalties or other enforcement action.

== Amendment and modification ==
=== Amendments ===
There are three ways an existing treaty can be amended. First, a formal amendment requires State parties to the treaty to go through the ratification process all over again. The re-negotiation of treaty provisions can be long and protracted, and often some parties to the original treaty will not become parties to the amended treaty. When determining the legal obligations of states, one party to the original treaty and one party to the amended treaty, the states will only be bound by the terms they both agreed upon.

Change in customary international law can also amend a treaty, where state behavior evinces a new interpretation of the legal obligations under the treaty. Minor corrections to a treaty may be adopted by a procès-verbal; but a procès-verbal is generally reserved for changes to rectify obvious errors in the text adopted, i.e., where the text adopted does not correctly reflect the intention of the parties adopting it.

=== Protocols ===
In international law and international relations, a protocol is generally a treaty or international agreement that supplements a previous treaty or international agreement. A protocol can amend the previous treaty or add additional provisions. Parties to the earlier agreement are not required to adopt the protocol, and this is sometimes made explicit, especially where many parties to the first agreement do not support the protocol.

A notable example is the United Nations Framework Convention on Climate Change (UNFCCC), which established a general framework for the development of binding greenhouse gas emission limits, followed by the Kyoto Protocol, which contained the specific provisions and regulations later agreed upon.

== Invalidity ==
An otherwise valid and agreed upon treaty may be rejected as a binding international agreement on several grounds. For example, the Japan–Korea treaties of 1905, 1907, and 1910 were protested by several governments as having been essentially forced upon Korea by Japan; they were confirmed as "already null and void" in the 1965 Treaty on Basic Relations between Japan and the Republic of Korea.

A treaty can be held invalid, including where parties act ultra vires or negligently, where execution has been obtained through fraudulent, corrupt or forceful means, or where the treaty contradicts peremptory norms.

=== Ultra vires treaties ===
If an act or lack thereof is condemned under international law, the act will not assume international legality even if approved by internal law. This means that in case of a conflict with domestic law, international law will always prevail.

A party's consent to a treaty is invalid if it had been given by an agent or body without power to do so under that state's domestic laws. States are reluctant to inquire into the internal affairs and processes of other states, and so a "manifest violation" is required such that it would be "objectively evident to any State dealing with the matter". A strong presumption exists internationally that a head of state has acted within their proper authority. No treaty has been recorded as having been invalidated on this basis.

Consent is also invalid if it was given by a representative acting outside their restricted powers during the negotiations, if the other parties to the treaty were notified of those restrictions prior to his or her signing.

=== Misunderstanding, fraud, corruption, coercion ===
Articles 46–53 of the Vienna Convention on the Law of Treaties set out the only ways that treaties can be invalidated—considered unenforceable and void under international law. A treaty will be invalidated due to either the circumstances by which a state party joined the treaty or due to the content of the treaty itself. Invalidation is separate from withdrawal, suspension, or termination (addressed above), which all involve an alteration in the consent of the parties of a previously valid treaty rather than the invalidation of that consent in the first place.

A governmental leader's consent may be invalidated if there was an erroneous understanding of a fact or situation at the time of conclusion, which formed the "essential basis" of the state's consent. Consent will not be invalidated if the misunderstanding was due to the state's own conduct, or if the truth should have been evident.

Consent will also be invalidated if it was induced by the fraudulent conduct of another party, or by the direct or indirect "corruption" of its representative by another party to the treaty. Coercion of either a representative or the state itself through the threat or use of force, if used to obtain the consent of that state to a treaty, will invalidate that consent.

=== Contrary to peremptory norms ===
A treaty is null and void if it is in violation of a peremptory norm. These norms, unlike other principles of customary law, are recognized as permitting no violations and so cannot be altered through treaty obligations. These are limited to such universally accepted prohibitions as those against the aggressive use of force, genocide and other crimes against humanity, piracy, hostilities directed at civilian population, racial discrimination and apartheid, slavery and torture, meaning that no state can legally assume an obligation to commit or permit such acts.

== Ending treaty obligations ==
=== Withdrawal and termination ===
Parties and signatories to the Vienna Convention on the Law of Treaties: Parties Signatories Non-parties

The possibility of treaty withdrawal or termination depends on the terms of the treaty and its travaux préparatoires. Parties may terminate or withdraw from a treaty in accordance with its terms or at any time with the consent of other parties, with 'termination' generally applying to a bilateral treaty and 'withdrawal' generally applying to a multilateral treaty.

Withdrawal by one party from a bilateral treaty is typically considered to terminate the treaty. Multilateral treaties typically continue even after the withdrawal of one member, unless the terms of the treaty or mutual agreement causes its termination.

==== Treaties expressly permitting withdrawal or termination ====
As obligations in international law are generally premised on the consent of states, many treaties expressly allow a state to withdraw as long as it follows certain procedures of notification ("denunciation"). Examples include:

- the Single Convention on Narcotic Drugs, which provides that the treaty will terminate if, as a result of denunciations, the number of parties falls below 40.
- Article 143 of the Charter of the Organization of American States (OAS), which enables member states to withdraw by officially informing the General Secretariat of the OAS their intended withdrawal subject to a two-year long sunset period.

Treaties sometimes include provisions for self-termination, meaning that the treaty is automatically terminated if certain defined conditions are met. Some treaties are intended by the parties to be only temporarily binding and are set to expire on a given date. Other treaties may self-terminate if the treaty is meant to exist only under certain conditions.

Article 62 of the VCLT permits a party to claim that a treaty should be terminated, even absent an express provision, if there has been a fundamental change in circumstances. Such a change is sufficient if unforeseen, if it undermined the "essential basis" of consent by a party if it radically transforms the extent of obligations between the parties, and if the obligations are still to be performed. A party cannot base this claim on change brought about by its own breach of the treaty. This claim also cannot be used to invalidate treaties that established or redrew political boundaries.

==== Treaties without express withdrawal or termination provisions ====
Article 56 of the VCLT provides that where a treaty is silent over whether or not it can be denounced there is a rebuttable presumption that it cannot be unilaterally denounced unless:

- it can be shown that the parties intended to admit the possibility, or
- a right of withdrawal can be inferred from the terms of the treaty.

Thus, some treaties may expressly or implicitly prohibit withdrawal. For example, when North Korea declared its intention to withdraw from the International Covenant on Civil and Political Rights, the UN Human Rights Committee concluded that its original drafters had not overlooked the possibility of explicitly providing for withdrawal but rather had deliberately intended not to provide for it. Consequently, withdrawal was not possible.

In practice, even where a treaty does not permit withdrawal, states can achieve the same effect by declaring an intent to withdraw and ceasing to follow the terms of the treaty. Other parties may accept this outcome, may consider the state to be untrustworthy in future dealings, or may retaliate with sanctions or military action.

=== Suspension ===
If a party has materially violated or breached its treaty obligations, the other parties may invoke this breach as grounds for temporarily suspending their obligations to that party under the treaty. A material breach may also be invoked as grounds for permanently terminating the treaty itself.

A treaty breach does not automatically suspend or terminate treaty relations, however. It depends on how the other parties regard the breach and how they resolve to respond to it. Sometimes treaties will provide for the seriousness of a breach to be determined by a tribunal or other independent arbiter. An advantage of such an arbiter is that it prevents a party from prematurely and perhaps wrongfully suspending or terminating its own obligations due to another's an alleged material breach.

== Cartels ==
Cartels (Italian: cartelle, German: Kartell-Konventionen) were a special kind of treaty within the international law of the 17th to 19th centuries. Their purpose was to regulate specific activities of common interest among contracting states that otherwise remained rivals in other areas. They were typically implemented on an administrative level. Similar to the cartels for duels and tournaments, these intergovernmental accords represented fairness agreements or gentlemen's agreements between states.

In the United States, cartels governed humanitarian actions typically carried out by cartel ships were dispatched for missions, such as to carry communications or prisoners between belligerents.

From European history, a broader range of purposes is known. These "cartels" often reflected the cohesion of authoritarian ruling classes against their own unruly citizens. Generally, the European governments concluded – while curbing their mutual rivalries partially – cooperation agreements, which should apply generally or only in case of war:

- Deserters, escaped serfs and criminals were to be mutually extradited.
- Prisoners of war should be handed out according to rank in different exchange ratios.
- The maintenance of postal and commercial traffic including the entry and exit of couriers should be guaranteed in the fields of communication and transport.
- "Customs cartels" (Zollkartelle) and "coin cartels" (Münzkartelle) were regulatory agreements between continental European states in the 19th century.
- Against smugglers and counterfeiters, a joint action approach was adopted by the governments contracting on international trade treaties. The latter often contained the relevant "cartel" regulations in their annexes.

The measures against criminals and unruly citizens were to be conducted regardless of the nationality and origin of the relevant persons. If necessary, national borders could be crossed by police forces of the respective neighboring country for capture and arrest. In the course of the 19th century, the term "cartel" gradually disappeared for intergovernmental agreements under international law. Instead, the term "convention" was used.

== Treaties under domestic national law ==
=== Australia ===
The constitution of Australia allows the executive government to enter into treaties, but the practice is for treaties to be tabled in both houses of parliament at least 15 days before signing. Treaties are considered a source of Australian law but sometimes require an act of parliament to be passed depending on their nature. Treaties are administered and maintained by the Department of Foreign Affairs and Trade, which advised that the "general position under Australian law is that treaties which Australia has joined, apart from those terminating a state of war, are not directly and automatically incorporated into Australian law. Signature and ratification do not, of themselves, make treaties operate domestically. In the absence of legislation, treaties cannot impose obligations on individuals nor create rights in domestic law. Nevertheless, international law, including treaty law, is a legitimate and important influence on the development of the common law and may be used in the interpretation of statutes." Treaties can be implemented by executive action, and often, existing laws are sufficient to ensure a treaty is honored.

Australian treaties generally fall under the following categories: extradition, postal agreements and money orders, trade and international conventions.

=== Brazil ===
The federal constitution of Brazil states that the power to enter into treaties is vested in the president of Brazil and that such treaties must be approved by the Congress of Brazil (Articles 84, Clause VIII, and 49, Clause I). In practice, that has been interpreted as meaning that the executive branch is free to negotiate and sign a treaty but that its ratification by the president requires the prior approval of Congress. Additionally, the Supreme Federal Court has ruled that after ratification and entry into force, a treaty must be incorporated into domestic law by means of a presidential decree published in the federal register for it to be valid in Brazil and applicable by the Brazilian authorities.

The court has established that treaties are subject to constitutional review and enjoy the same hierarchical position as ordinary legislation (leis ordinárias, or "ordinary laws", in Portuguese). A more recent ruling by the Supreme Federal Court in 2008 has altered that somewhat by stating that treaties containing human rights provisions enjoy a status above that of ordinary legislation, subject to only the constitution itself. Additionally, the 45th Amendment to the constitution makes human rights treaties approved by Congress by a special procedure enjoy the same hierarchical position as a constitutional amendment. The hierarchical position of treaties in relation to domestic legislation is of relevance to the discussion on whether and how the latter can abrogate the former and vice versa.

The constitution does not have an equivalent to the Supremacy Clause in U.S. Constitution, which is of interest to the discussion on the relation between treaties and legislation of the states of Brazil.

=== India ===
In India, subjects are divided into three lists: union, state and concurrent. In the normal legislation process, the subjects on the union list must be legislated by the Parliament of India. For subjects on the state list, only the respective state legislature can legislate. For subjects on the concurrent list, both governments can make laws. However, to implement international treaties, Parliament can legislate on any subject and even override the general division of subject lists.

=== United States ===
In the United States, the term "treaty" has a distinct and more restricted legal definition than in international law. U.S. law distinguishes between "treaties", as defined in the U.S. Constitution, and "executive agreements", which are either "congressional-executive agreements" or "sole executive agreements"; although all three classes are equally treaties under international law, they are subject to different political and legal requirements and implications in the U.S.

The distinctions primarily concern the method of approval: Treaties require the "advice and consent" by two-thirds of the Senators present, whereas sole executive agreements are executed by the President acting alone and congressional-executive agreements require majority approval by both the House and the Senate. The three classifications are not mutually exclusive: A treaty may require a simple majority in Congress before or after it is signed by the President or may grant the President authority to fill in the gaps with executive agreements, rather than additional treaties or protocols.

Currently, international agreements are ten times more likely to be executed by executive agreement, due to their relative ease. Nevertheless, the President still often chooses to pursue the formal treaty process over an executive agreement to gain congressional support on matters that require Congress to pass implementing legislation or appropriate funds as well as for agreements that impose long-term, complex legal obligations on the U.S. For example, the Iran nuclear deal (an agreement by the United States, Iran, and other countries) is not a treaty under U.S. law, but rather a "political commitment" that does not bind the parties by law.

The nuances and ambiguity of how international agreements are effectuated or implemented in U.S. law has been subject to multiple legal cases. The U.S. Supreme Court ruled in the Head Money Cases (1884) that "treaties" do not have a privileged position over acts of Congress and can be repealed or modified by legislative action just like any other regular law. In a similar vein, the court's decision in Reid v. Covert (1957) held that treaty provisions that conflict with the U.S. Constitution are null and void under U.S. law. However, the U.S. Supreme Court has also recognized the "supremacy" of treaties in the U.S. Constitution, such as in Ware v. Hylton (1796) and Missouri v. Holland (1920).

The relative ease by which certain international agreements could be entered into by the President has often prompted congressional pushback, most notably in the proposed Bricker Amendment to the U.S. Constitution, which explicitly sought to rein in executive treatymaking powers.

== Treaties and indigenous peoples ==
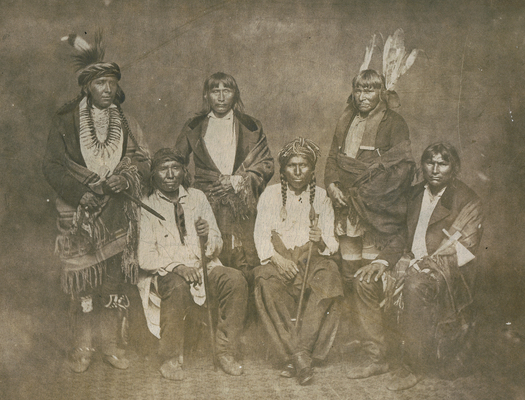
A treaty delegation of the Mdewakanton and Wahpekute indigenous tribes to Washington, D.C. (1858)

Treaties formed an important part of European colonization; in many parts of the world, Europeans attempted to legitimize their control over land by signing treaties with indigenous peoples. In most cases, these treaties were in extremely disadvantageous terms to the native people, who often did not comprehend the implications of what they were signing.

In some rare cases, such as with Ethiopia and Qing China, local governments were able to use the treaties to at least mitigate the impact of European colonization. This involved learning the intricacies of European diplomatic customs and then using the treaties to prevent power from overstepping their agreement or by playing different powers against each other.

In other cases, such as New Zealand and Canada, treaties allowed indigenous peoples to maintain a minimum amount of autonomy. Such treaties between colonizers and indigenous peoples are an important part of political discourse in the late 20th and early 21st century, the treaties being discussed have international standing as has been stated in a treaty study by the UN.

=== Australia ===
In the case of Indigenous Australians, no treaty was ever entered into with the Indigenous peoples entitling the Europeans to land ownership, mostly adopting the doctrine of terra nullius (with the exception of South Australia). This concept was later overturned by Mabo v Queensland, which established the concept of native title in Australia well after colonization was already a fait accompli.

On 10 December 2019, the Victorian First Peoples' Assembly met for the first time in the Upper House of the Parliament of Victoria in Melbourne. The main aim of the Assembly is to work out the rules by which individual treaties would be negotiated between the Victorian Government and individual Aboriginal Victorian peoples. It will also establish an independent Treaty Authority, which will oversee the negotiations between the Aboriginal groups and the Victorian Government and ensure fairness.

=== United States ===
Prior to 1871, the government of the United States regularly entered into treaties with Native Americans but the Indian Appropriations Act of 3 March 1871 had a rider attached that effectively ended the President's treaty-making by providing that no Indian nation or tribe shall be acknowledged as an independent nation, tribe, or power with whom the United States may contract by treaty. The federal government continued to provide similar contractual relations with the Indian tribes after 1871 by agreements, statutes, and executive orders.

=== Canada ===
Colonization in Canada saw a number of treaties signed between European settlers and Indigenous First Nations peoples. Historic Canadian treaties tend to fall into three broad categories: commercial, alliance, and territorial. Commercial treaties first emerged in the 17th century and were agreements made between the European fur trading companies and the local First Nations. The Hudson's Bay Company, a British trading company located in what is now Northern Ontario, signed numerous commercial treaties during this period. Alliance treaties, commonly referred to as "treaties of peace, friendship and alliance" emerged in the late 17th to early 18th century. Finally, territorial treaties dictating land rights were signed between 1760 and 1923. The Royal Proclamation of 1763 accelerated the treaty-making process and provided the Crown with access to large amounts of land occupied by the First Nations. The Crown and 364 First Nations signed 70 treaties that are recognized by the Government of Canada and represent over 600,000 First Nation individuals. The treaties are as follows:

- Treaties of Peace and Neutrality (1701–1760)
- Peace and Friendship Treaties (1725–1779)
- Upper Canada Land Surrenders (including Toronto Purchase(Treaty 13), Johnson-Butler Purchase (Gunshot Treaty)) and the Williams Treaties (1764–1862/1923)
- Robinson Treaties and Douglas Treaties (1850–1854)
- The Numbered Treaties (1871–1921)

==== Treaty perceptions ====
There is evidence that "although both Indigenous and European Nations engaged in treaty-making before contact with each other, the traditions, beliefs, and worldviews that defined concepts such as "treaties" were extremely different". The Indigenous understanding of treaties is based on traditional culture and values. Maintaining healthy and equitable relationships with other nations, as well as the environment, is paramount. Gdoo-naaganinaa, a historic treaty between the Nishnaabeg nation and the Haudenosaunee Confederacy is an example of how First Nations approach treaties. Under Gdoo-naaganinaa, also referred-to in English as Our Dish, the neighbouring nations acknowledged that while they were separate nations they shared the same ecosystem or Dish. It was agreed that the nations would respectably share the land, not interfering with the other nation's sovereignty while also not monopolizing environmental resources. First Nations agreements, such as the Gdoo-naaganigaa, are considered "living treaties" that must be upheld continually and renewed over time. European settlers in Canada had a different perception of treaties. Treaties were not a living, equitable agreement but rather a legal contract over which the future creation of Canadian law would later rely on. As time passed, the settlers did not think it necessary to abide by all treaty agreements. A review of historic treaties reveals that the European settler understanding is the dominant view portrayed in Canadian treaties.

==== Treaties today ====
Canada today recognizes 25 additional treaties called Modern Treaties. These treaties represent the relationships between 97 Indigenous groups which includes over 89,000 people. The treaties have been instrumental in strengthening Indigenous stronghold in Canada by providing the following (as organized by the Government of Canada) :

- Indigenous ownership over 600,000 km² of land (almost the size of Manitoba)
- capital transfers of over $3.2 billion
- protection of traditional ways of life
- access to resource development opportunities
- participation in land and resources management decisions
- certainty with respect to land rights in round 40% of Canada's land mass
- associated self-government rights and political recognition

=== New Zealand ===
The Treaty of Waitangi (1840) is the foundational document of New Zealand and one of the most significant and extensively debated indigenous treaties in the world. It was signed between representatives of the British Crown and over 500 Māori chiefs (rangatira) across New Zealand.

The treaty exists in both English and Māori, which differ in material respects. The English text granted the Crown sovereignty over New Zealand, while the Māori text used the word kawanatanga (governance), with Māori retaining tino rangatiratanga (generally understood as full chiefly authority or self-determination) over their lands, villages and treasures. This divergence has been the source of significant and ongoing legal and political dispute.

For much of the 19th and early 20th centuries, New Zealand courts treated the treaty as having no enforceable status in domestic law. The Treaty of Waitangi Act 1975 established the Waitangi Tribunal, a permanent commission of inquiry empowered to investigate Crown actions alleged to be inconsistent with the principles of the Treaty of Waitangi, and references to those principles have since been incorporated into numerous pieces of legislation. Ongoing settlement negotiations between the Crown and iwi (tribal groups) have produced formal redress for historical breaches including through financial compensation, land transfers, and formal apologies.

== See also ==
- Bilateral treaty
- Multilateral treaty
- Peace treaty
- Treaty of Friendship
- Foedus
- Jus tractatuum
- List of intergovernmental organizations
- List of treaties
- Manrent (feudal Scottish Clan treaty)
- Supranational union
- Treaty ratification
- Vienna Convention on the Law of Treaties
