= Motor (disambiguation) =

A motor is a mechanical or electrical device that creates motion.

Motor or Motors may also refer to:

- Mator language, also Motor, extinct Uralic language
- Mator people, also Motors, extinct Uralic people, speakers of the Mator language
- The Motors, a British rock band, formed in 1977
- Motor (Australian magazine), formerly known as Modern Motor, an Australian magazine
- Motor (American magazine), an American automobile monthly
- Motor, a defunct Indonesian automobile monthly magazine
- The Motor, formerly known as Motorcycling and Motoring, a defunct British magazine
- Motor (Polish magazine), a Polish automobile weekly magazine
- Motor Lublin, or just Motor, a Polish professional football club
- Motor České Budějovice, or just Motor, a Czech professional men's ice hockey club

== Places ==
- Motor, Iowa, a small town in Iowa, USA
- Motor, Kansas, a ghost town in Kansas, USA

== See also ==
- Engine (disambiguation)
