= Greetchen Diaz =

Puerto Rican scientist

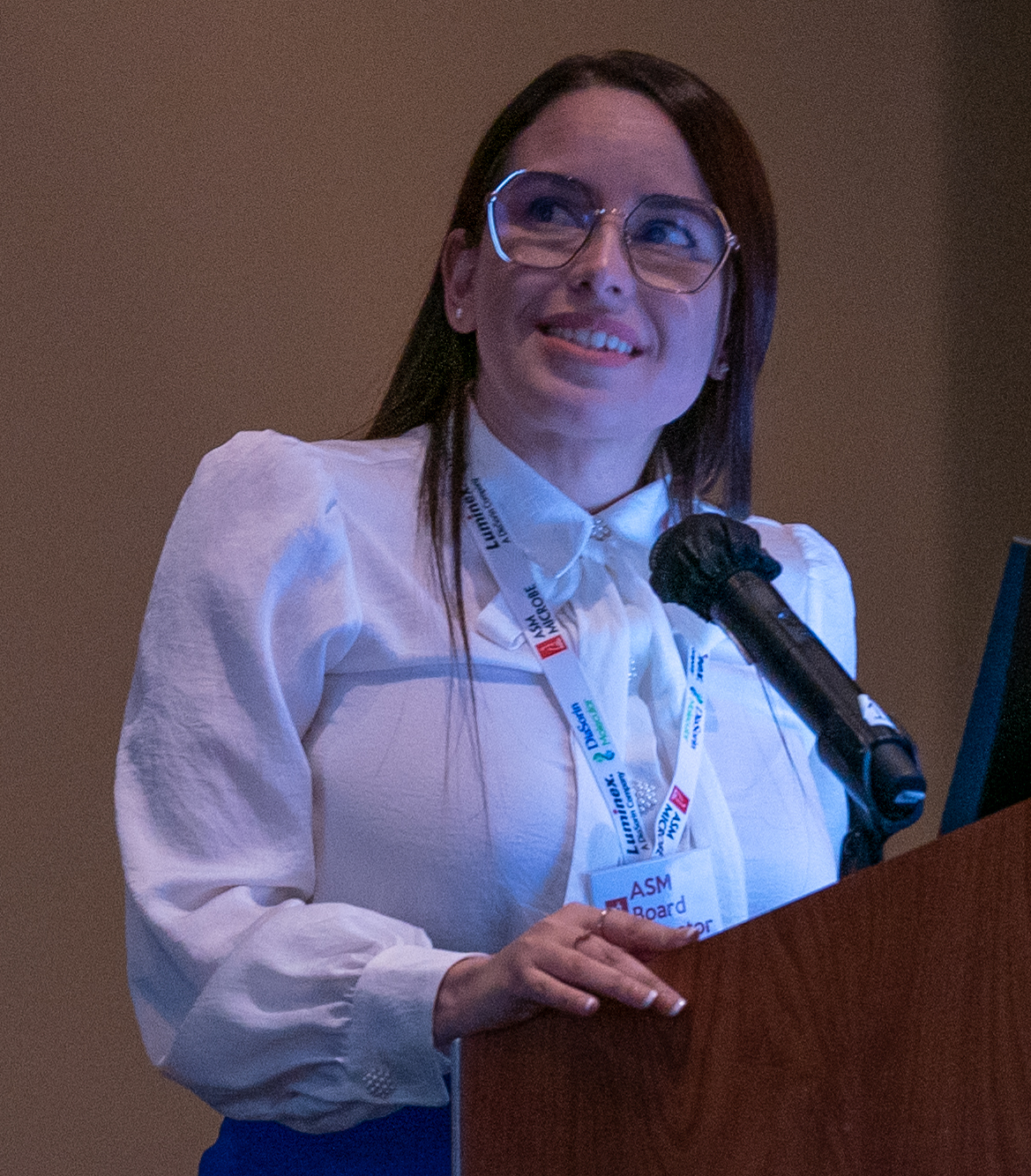
- Díaz in 2022
- Born: Ponce, Puerto Rico
- Education: University of Puerto Rico, Mayagüez Ohio State University
- Scientific career
- Workplaces: Ciencia Puerto Rico

Greetchen Díaz Muñoz is a Puerto Rican scientist and the current Director of the Science Education Program at Ciencia Puerto Rico. She was named an AAAS IF/THEN Ambassador in 2019.

== Early life and education ==
Díaz was born and grew up in Ponce, Puerto Rico, the oldest of five siblings. In 2002, she graduated magna cum laude with a bachelor's of science in biology from the University of Puerto Rico, Mayagüez. She received her master's degree in biology at the University of Puerto Rico, Mayagüez in 2006, and her Ph.D. in 2012 from Ohio State University. She next completed a post-doctoral fellowship position in virology at the University of Nebraska–Lincoln working on HPV.

== Career ==
A landmark development in Díaz's career in science advocacy was the November 2013 launch of the "Boriqueña" blog, hosted by CenciaPR. The purpose of the blog is "to focus attention on the scientific contributions of Boricuas and Hispanic women and thereby motivate and set an example for future generations of female scientists." In 2014, Díaz started working at the Puerto Rico Science, Technology and Research Trust, overseeing the organization's grants program. She joined Ciencia PR in 2017 as Director of the Science Education Program, where she fosters the participation of STEM experts in K-12 education, focusing specifically on providing opportunities for Latina girls and young women.

== Awards and honors ==
- 2017 American Society for Microbiology Board of Directors
- 2019 AAAS IF/THEN Ambassador
- Chair, American Society for Microbiology Inclusive Diversity with Equity, Access and Accountability (IDEAA) Committee of the Board
