= Form letter =

Letter written from a template

A form letter is a letter written from a template, rather than being specially composed for a specific recipient. The most general kind of form letter consists of one or more regions of boilerplate text interspersed with one or more substitution placeholders.

Although form letters are generally intended for a wide audience, many form letters include stylistic elements or features intended to appear specifically tailored to the recipient. For example, they might be signed by autopen and use features such as mail merge, which automatically inserts the names of the individual recipients.

== Uses ==
Form letters are often used as replies from people who get large amounts of correspondence, such as celebrities or politicians. This can lead to controversy if a form letter is used where a more personalised message would have been appropriate, such as when offering condolences.

Other form letters are used to notify candidates as part of an application process, such as acceptance or rejection letters from publishing companies, governing bodies, colleges, universities or prospective employers.

== See also ==
- E-mail spam
