= Sally Kornbluth =

American microbiologist and academic administrator

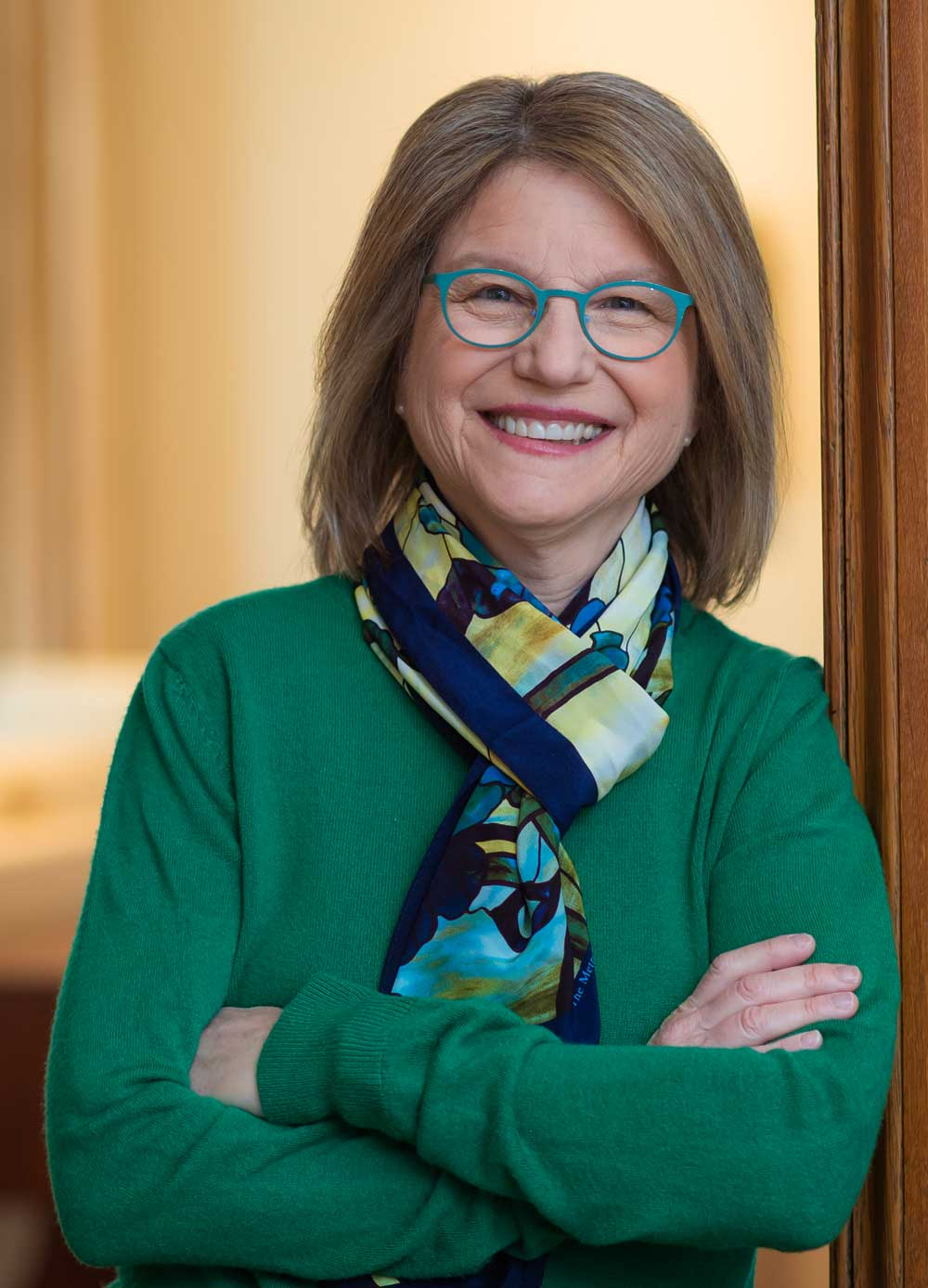
- Kornbluth in 2023

18th President of the Massachusetts Institute of Technology
- Incumbent
- Assumed office January 1, 2023
- Preceded by: L. Rafael Reif

Provost of Duke University
- In office July 1, 2014 – December 31, 2022
- Preceded by: Peter Lange
- Succeeded by: Jennifer Francis (interim)

Personal details
- Born: Sally Ann Kornbluth; 1960 (age 65–66) Paterson, New Jersey, U.S.
- Spouse: Daniel Lew
- Children: 2
- Education: Williams College (BA); Emmanuel College, Cambridge (BA); Rockefeller University (PhD)
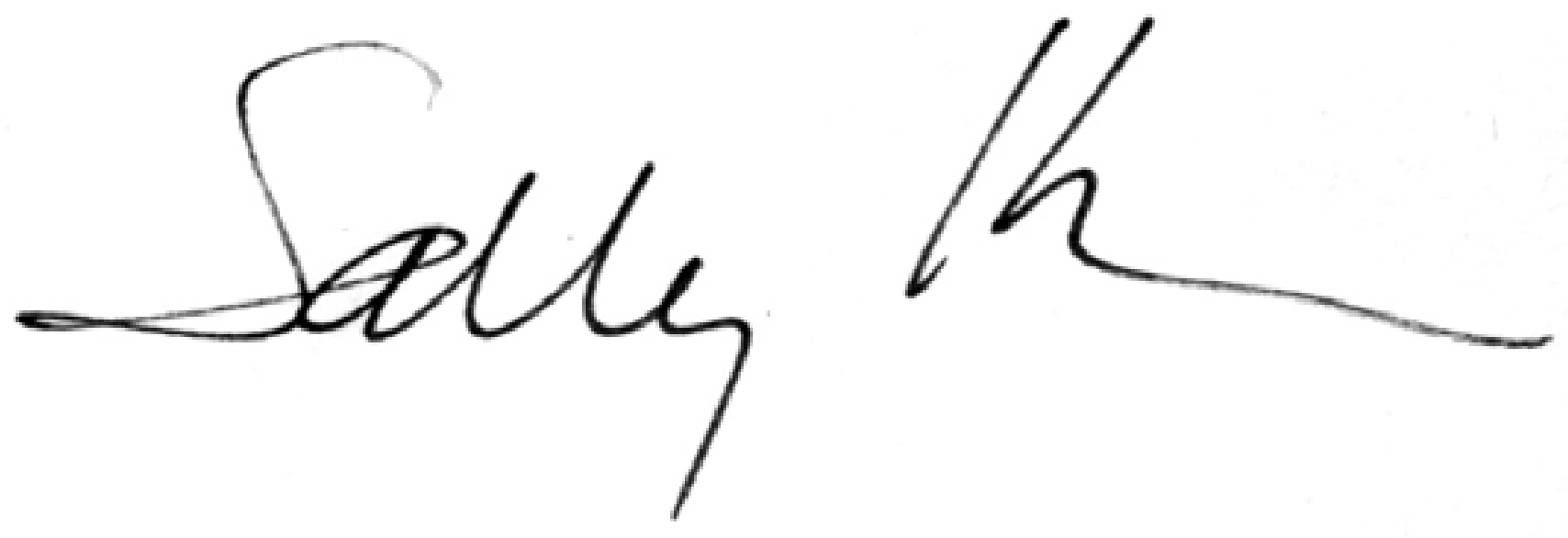
- Signature
- Scientific career
- Fields: Cellular biology
- Workplaces: Duke University; Massachusetts Institute of Technology
- Thesis: Modulation of cellular SRC family tyrosine kinases: phosphorylation state and polyomavirus middle T antigen binding (1989)
- Doctoral advisor: Hidesaburo Hanafusa
- Doctoral students: Daniel Colón-Ramos

Sally Ann Kornbluth (born 1960) is an American cell biologist, currently serving as the 18th president of the Massachusetts Institute of Technology since January 2023. She served as provost of Duke University from July 2014 to December 2022.

== Early life and education ==
Kornbluth was born in Paterson, New Jersey, and grew up in Fair Lawn, New Jersey. She graduated in 1978 from Fair Lawn High School. Her father George was an accountant, and her mother, Marisa Galvany, was an opera singer.

Kornbluth received a Bachelor of Arts with a major in political science from Williams College in 1982 and a Bachelor of Arts in natural sciences with a specialisation in genetics from the University of Cambridge in 1984. She received a Doctor of Philosophy in molecular oncology from Rockefeller University in 1989.

While at Emmanuel College, Cambridge, she was a Herchel Smith Scholar. She worked at the laboratory of Hidesaburo Hanafusa when at Rockefeller University, and performed postdoctoral training with John Newport at the University of California, San Diego.

== Career ==
=== Duke University ===
Kornbluth joined the faculty at Duke University in 1994. Her research focuses on cell growth and programmed cell death and how cancer cells evade apoptosis. She is interested in the role of programmed cell death in regulating the length of female fertility in vertebrates, in a mechanism regulated by caspase-2.

At Duke, she received a Research Mentoring award in 2012 and the Distinguished Faculty Award from the Duke Medical Alumni Association in 2013. She was elected to the Institute of Medicine in 2013.

In 2014, Kornbluth became provost at Duke, the first woman to serve in this role. As provost, she oversaw a leadership transition in which female Deans became a majority at Duke. She is an advocate of liberal arts education and has stated that her own experience in a liberal arts school at Williams College led her to a career in the sciences. She is also an advocate for online learning as a driver of pedagogic innovation.

She also served as Chair of the Board of Trustees of Duke Kunshan University in China, overseeing the appointment of Al Bloom as Duke Kunshan University's Executive Vice Chancellor in 2020 and the launch of the WHU–Duke Research Institute in 2014.

Kornbluth served as vice dean for basic sciences at the Duke University School of Medicine from 2006 to 2014 and as provost of Duke University from 2014 to 2022.

=== Massachusetts Institute of Technology ===
In 2022, Kornbluth was selected as the 18th president of the Massachusetts Institute of Technology, succeeding L. Rafael Reif in 2023. At her inauguration, she outlined objectives for MIT, including accelerating work on climate change and strengthening links between engineering and life sciences.

Following the 2023 Hamas-led attack on Israel, Kornbluth and then presidents of the University of Pennsylvania and of Harvard University were summoned by the United States House Committee on Education and the Workforce to testify before a congressional hearing in December 2023 about antisemitism on their university campuses. When asked by United States Representative Elise Stefanik (R–NY) whether calls for "genocide of Jews" was harassment under university policies, she responded, "If targeted at individuals, not making public statements." Kornbluth's statement has been described by Stefanik and others as antisemitic, leading to calls by some for Kornbluth's resignation.

== Honors ==
- National Academy of Medicine
- National Academy of Inventors
- American Academy of Arts and Sciences

== Personal life ==
Kornbluth is Jewish. She is married to Daniel Lew, a professor of biology at MIT. Lew was a student at Trinity College, Cambridge, while Kornbluth was studying at Emmanuel College; they were enrolled in the same genetics course. They have two children.

Academic offices
Preceded by Leo Rafael Reif	18th President of the Massachusetts Institute of Technology; 2023–present	Incumbent
