= Template engine =

Template engine may refer to:

- Template processor, the general concept
  - Web template system, contains a web templating engine as one component
- Mail merge, template engines used in word processing applications
- Preprocessor, template engines used in conjunction with a compiler

== See also ==
- Template (disambiguation)
- Engine (disambiguation)
