= Peter de Lange =

Peter de Lange may refer to:

- Peter de Lange (footballer) (born 1988), Dutch footballer
- Peter de Lange (botanist) (born 1966), New Zealand botanist

== See also ==
- Peter Lange (disambiguation)
- Peter Lang (disambiguation)
