= Canned response =

Predetermined response to a common question

A canned response or canned reply is a predetermined response to a common question.

In fields such as technical support, canned responses to frequently asked questions may be an effective solution for both the customer and the technical adviser, as they offer the possibility to provide a quick answer to common inquiries while requiring little human intervention.

Improperly used, canned responses can prove frustrating to users by providing inadequate answers.

== Technical support ==
=== Assisting human operators ===
In text-based technical support systems, the operator may insert a canned response triggered by keystrokes or from a drop-down menu, rather than typing the same answer repeatedly or pasting from some other resource. For example, if a support representative at an ISP's technical support team is asked to explain how to add an attachment to an email, rather than typing in all the details, the support representative may choose the response from a drop down menu, and it gets inserted into the response.

The representative is more productive this way, and the user receives a more carefully crafted answer. Some programs have built-in functions which allow canned responses, and other software is available which can insert canned responses into any other application.

Canned responses, however, can have disadvantages. Sloppy or pressured support people could end up using canned responses as a quick fix when they do not really resolve the customer's problem or are only tangentially relevant to the user's problem.

=== Chatbots ===
Chatbots can be used to provide users with a fully automated access to a broad set of canned responses. Chatbots can vary in sophistication, from rule-based programs offering the same answer to every user to programs using technologies such as artificial intelligence to adapt answers to the particular situation of the user.

== Use in email clients ==
Since 2008, the term has also referred to quick answers that email clients provide to their users to reply to common messages they may receive.

Gmail introduced the feature in 2011 as part of Gmail Labs.

In 2015, the company rolled out Smart Reply, a feature that scans and recognizes the types of messages that need responses and uses machine learning to provide the user with personalised canned responses.

== See also ==
- Autopen
- Boilerplate text
