= Susan Hockfield =

American neuroscientist (born 1951)

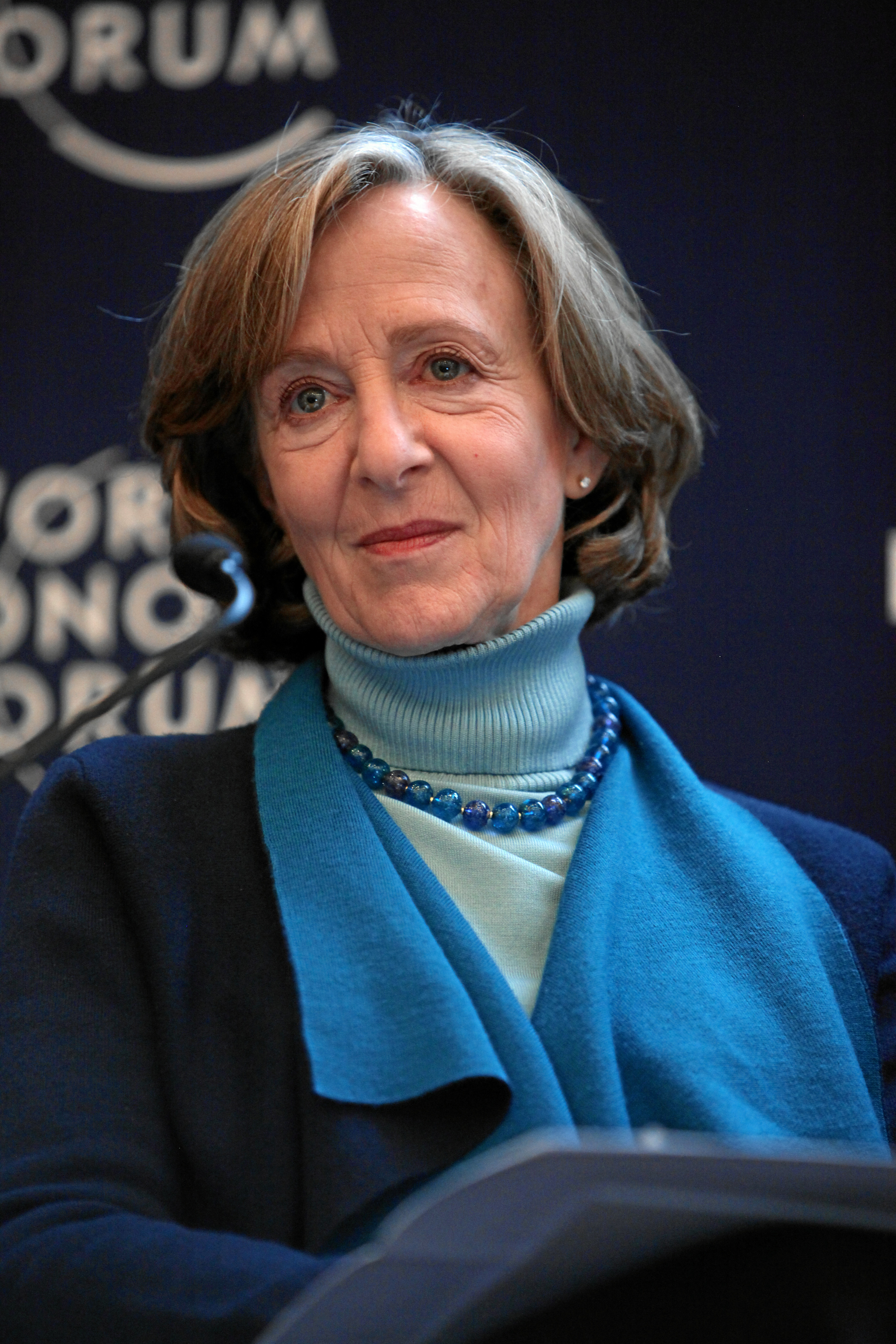

16th President of the Massachusetts Institute of Technology
- In office August 5, 2004 – December 31, 2012
- Preceded by: Charles M. Vest
- Succeeded by: L. Rafael Reif

Provost of Yale University
- In office December 11, 2002 – August 5, 2004
- Preceded by: Alison Richard
- Succeeded by: Andrew D. Hamilton

Personal details
- Born: March 24, 1951 (age 75) Chicago, Illinois, U.S.
- Spouse: Thomas Byrne
- Education: University of Rochester (BS); Georgetown University (MS, PhD)
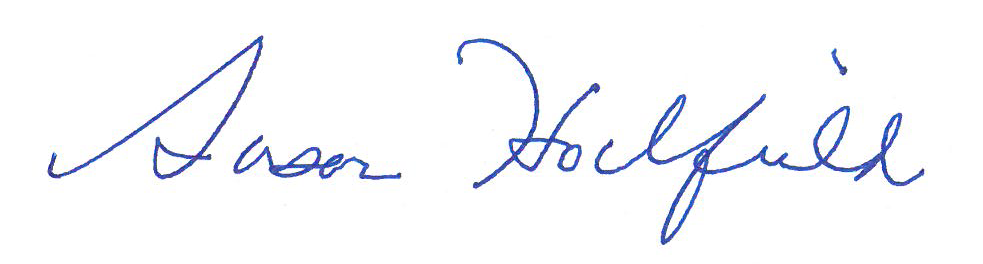
- Signature
- Scientific career
- Fields: Neuroscience
- Workplaces: Cold Spring Harbor Laboratory; Yale University; Massachusetts Institute of Technology
- Thesis: Afferent and Efferent Neuronal Connections of the Dorsal Horn of the Caudal Medulla (Trigeminal Nucleus Caudalis) Demonstrated by Retrograde Labeling with Horseradish Peroxidase (1979)
- Doctoral advisor: Stephen Gobel
- Other academic advisors: Allan Basbaum
- Doctoral students: Daniel Geschwind

Susan Hockfield (born March 24, 1951) is an American neuroscientist who served as the 16th president of the Massachusetts Institute of Technology from 2004 to 2012.

Hockfield currently serves as a Professor of Neuroscience in MIT's Department of Brain and Cognitive Sciences, a Joint Professor of Work and Organization Studies in MIT’s Sloan School of Management, and a member of the Koch Institute for Integrative Cancer Research. She is also a director of Break Through Cancer, Cajal Neuroscience, Fidelity Non-Profit Management Foundation, Lasker Foundation, Mass General Brigham, Pfizer, Repertoire Immune Medicines, and the Whitehead Institute for Biomedical Research; a lifetime member of the MIT Corporation; and a board member of the Belfer Center at the Harvard Kennedy School of Government. Before returning to MIT following her presidency, Hockfield held the Marie Curie Visiting Professorship at Harvard University's John F. Kennedy School of Government.

== Early life and education ==
Hockfield graduated from Horace Greeley High School in Chappaqua, New York, in 1969. She received her bachelor's degree in Biology from the University of Rochester in 1973 and her Ph.D. in Anatomy and Neuroscience from the Georgetown University School of Medicine in 1979. Her doctoral dissertation centered on the pathways in the nervous system through which pain is perceived and processed. Her advisor during her doctoral work was Stephen Gobel.

== Career ==
Following a postdoctoral fellowship at the University of California, San Francisco, Hockfield joined the staff of the Cold Spring Harbor Laboratory in 1980. She was hired by James Watson, who together with Francis Crick had discovered the structure of DNA.

In 1985, Hockfield joined the faculty of Yale University. She received tenure in 1991 and became a full professor of neurobiology in 1994; soon thereafter she began to take on positions of administrative leadership. From 1998 to 2002, she served as Dean of Yale's Graduate School of Arts and Sciences, with oversight of 70 graduate programs. Over the course of her deanship, the number of applicants to the graduate school doubled. Support for graduate students also expanded in many dimensions, including healthcare, career counseling, fellowships, and opportunities to interact with faculty.

In December 2002, she was named Yale's Provost – the university's second-highest officer, with oversight of the university's 12 schools. As Provost, she led major initiatives in science, medicine, and engineering, including a $500 million investment in scientific facilities.

During her time as dean and as provost, Hockfield was at the center of an imbroglio surrounding the Graduate Employees and Students Organization and its unionization efforts. While Yale opposed the student union, Hockfield made healthcare for Ph.D. students free and increased stipends for graduate students.

=== MIT presidency ===
In August 2004, the Massachusetts Institute of Technology named Hockfield its next president. MIT raised nearly $3 billion during Hockfield's presidency, making it a more successful period of fundraising than any prior administration. However, the 2008 financial crisis put great pressure on the Institute's endowment, which was valued at $5.9 billion upon Hockfield's arrival. It peaked at $9.9 billion in June 2008, then fell to $7.9 billion. By June 2011, it was valued at $9.7 billion. Through these financial ups and downs, Hockfield made affordability a priority: Annual undergraduate financial aid increased by about 75 percent during her presidency.

In her inaugural address, Hockfield called for MIT to cultivate the convergence of engineering and the life sciences to develop new approaches to address global challenges. She encouraged work that crossed disciplines, departments, and schools within MIT and that fostered collaborations among the Boston region's academic medical centers and educational institutions. To that end, she led, among other efforts, the establishment of the David H. Koch Institute for Integrative Cancer Research; the Ragon Institute (a collaboration between Massachusetts General Hospital, MIT, and Harvard University); and the Massachusetts Green High Performance Computing Center in Holyoke, Massachusetts, an unprecedented collaboration of 5 universities, 2 private companies, and the Commonwealth of Massachusetts to provide state-of-the art computation tools for research in a wide variety of fields.

Hockfield also announced her intention to develop a multidisciplinary, Institute-wide center focused on energy. That effort spawned the MIT Energy Initiative, which raised more than $350 million during Hockfield's tenure and accelerated research on technologies and policies for a sustainable energy future. In 2009, U.S. President Barack Obama gave an address on U.S. energy policy at MIT, and Hockfield gave him the first tour of an MIT laboratory by a sitting U.S. president.

Hockfield also encouraged concerted faculty research in an area she considered vital to American national interests: manufacturing. She launched “Production in the Innovation Economy,” a campus-wide project to provide a blueprint for 21st century manufacturing in America. During her presidency, she served as the inaugural co-chair of the White House-led Advanced Manufacturing Partnership (AMP), a task force of government, industry, and academic leaders. In an August 2011 New York Times op-ed, Hockfield wrote, “To make our economy grow, sell more goods to the world and replenish the work force, we need to restore manufacturing — not the assembly-line jobs of the past, but the high-tech advanced manufacturing of the future.”

During Hockfield's presidency, representation of underrepresented minorities and women increased across the undergraduate, graduate, and faculty populations. The graduating Class of 2015 was composed of 45 percent women and 24 percent underrepresented minorities. To address the growing interest in attending MIT (applications more than doubled during her tenure), Hockfield initiated an expansion of the undergraduate population. She also guided enhancements to student life and learning, including the construction of a new residence for graduate students and a restoration of MIT's oldest building into an undergraduate residence with expanded space and amenities to foster student collaboration.

In addition, while Hockfield was president, the east side of MIT's campus was enhanced by an extension to the Media Lab complex and a new building for the MIT Sloan School of Management. Hockfield also led a comprehensive strategic planning process for campus development and worked to foster the innovation cluster around Kendall Square, which at the end of her presidency was home to more biotech and life sciences companies per square mile than anywhere in the world.

In December 2011, MIT launched MITx, a not-for-profit online learning platform that offers online versions of MIT courses free of charge. In May 2012, Hockfield and Harvard president Drew Gilpin Faust announced edX, an MIT-Harvard partnership in online education. EdX, Hockfield said, “represents a unique opportunity to improve education on our own campuses through online learning, while simultaneously creating a bold new educational path for millions of learners worldwide.”

=== Scientific research ===
Hockfield pioneered the use of monoclonal antibody technology in brain research and discovered a gene that plays a critical role in the spread of cancer in the brain. Hockfield's early work involved the application of monoclonal antibody technology to questions within neurobiology. She and her colleagues identified a family of cell surface proteins whose expression is regulated by neuronal activity early in an animal's life and which reflect the effect of early experience on brain structure and function. A link between her research and human health was made when it was suggested that one of these proteins played a role in the progression of brain tumors. Hockfield's work on a type of brain tumor called glioma identified molecules that allow glioma cells to move through normal brain tissue, the feature that makes glioma particularly deadly.

== Honors and awards ==
- Elected President of the American Association for the Advancement of Science (AAAS) in 2016, and served as Chairman in 2018
- Elected fellow of the American Academy of Arts and Sciences
- Elected fellow of the American Association for the Advancement of Science
- Honorary degrees from Georgetown University, Northeastern University, Duke University, Brown University, Icahn School of Medicine at Mount Sinai, Tsinghua University, University of Edinburgh, Pierre-and-Marie-Curie University (University of Paris 6), University of Massachusetts Medical School, University of Rochester, the Watson School of Biological Sciences at the Cold Spring Harbor Laboratory, and a jointly awarded honorary degree from the Universidade Nova de Lisboa, the Technical University of Lisbon, and the University of Porto.
- Wilbur Lucius Cross Medal, Yale University Graduate School
- Meliora Citation for Career Achievement, University of Rochester
- Charles Judson Herrick Award (for outstanding contributions by a young scientist), American Association of Anatomists
- Amelia Earhart Award, which is given by the Women's Union to honor women who have significantly contributed to the expansion of opportunities for women
- Pinnacle Award for Lifetime Achievement from the Greater Boston Chamber of Commerce
- Golden Plate Award of the American Academy of Achievement in 2005, presented by Awards Council member Dr. Tenley Albright
- Edison Achievement Award in 2010 for her commitment to innovation throughout her career

== Selected works ==
- The Age of Living Machines: How Biology Will Build the Next Technology Revolution, W. W. Norton & Company, 2019. ISBN 978-0-393-63474-7.
- Our science, our society, Science Magazine, Vol 359 Issue 6375, 2018.

== Personal life ==
Hockfield is married to Thomas N. Byrne, M.D., a Professor of Neurology and Health Sciences Technology (part-time) at the Harvard Medical School and a Senior Lecturer of Brain and Cognitive Sciences at MIT. They were married on March 2, 1991, at Yale's Battell Chapel. They have a daughter, Elizabeth.

Academic offices
Preceded by Charles M. Vest	16th President of the Massachusetts Institute of Technology; 2004–2012	Succeeded by L. Rafael Reif
