= Peter Lang =

Peter Lang may refer to:

- Peter Lang (actor) (1859–1932), American actor
- Peter Lang (guitarist) (born 1948), American musician
- Peter Lang (politician) (born 1950), Canadian Member of Parliament
- Peter Lang (sailor, born 1963) (born 1963), German sailor
- Peter Lang (sailor, born 1989) (born 1989), Danish sailor
- Peter Lang (swimmer) (born 1958), German Olympic swimmer
- Peter Läng (born 1986), Thai-Swiss footballer for FC Schaffhausen
- Peter Redford Scott Lang (1850–1926), Scottish mathematician
- Peter Lang (publisher), academic publisher

== See also ==
- Peter Lange (disambiguation)
- Peter de Lange (disambiguation)
