= Template (word processing) =

Sample document with pre-prepared elements

The term template, when used in the context of word processing software, refers to a sample document that has already some details in place; those can (that is added/completed, removed or changed, differently from a fill-in-the-blank of the approach as in a form) either by hand or through an automated iterative process, such as with a software assistant. Once the template is completed, the user can edit, save and manage the result as an ordinary word processing document. Word processing templates enable the ability to bypass the initial setup and configuration time necessary to create standardized documents such as a resume. They also enable the automatic configuration of the user interface of the word processing software, with features such as autocompletion, toolbars, thesaurus, and spelling options.

Word processing templates are ordinarily included as a regular feature in most word processing software. In addition, users of such software often have the option to create and save their own templates, to acquire them from the original vendor of the software, or from third parties.

== Overview ==
Word processing templates provide functionality for:

- "Fill-in-the-blank" completion of routinely used document classes or (a stencil/master copy)
- Mail merge to produce personalized mailings
- Time-saving document-fragment creation (for items such as headers footers and boilerplate)
- Time-saving GUI-configuration (for configuring the desktop GUI with precisely the desired standard look and feel, usually tailored to a given profession or industry)
- Time-saving user standardization (for ensuring a specific user or work group has access to documents that are unique to the user's role in the organization)
- Quick means of preparation of meeting data in presentable way.

== Uses ==
Word processing templates have the standard "fill-in-the-blank" features similar to other kinds of templates in computer software. They also have features that specifically leverage the functionality of the word processor user interface.

Specific examples include ability to:

- Copy macros, styles, and auto completion entries from one template (or document) to another;
- Reuse a page header, watermark, structure, and many forms of repeated document contents;
- Create and remove entries (from the New > File menu) for fast access to frequently used templates;
- Save automation scripts in languages such as Visual Basic for Applications;
- Save and configure the toolbar, menus, or keyboard shortcuts to work across editing sessions, or on a user-by-user basis;
- Configure up and use work group templates, or a default template applied automatically whenever a new document is created;
- Quickly write résumés and Curricula Vitae;
- Easily write reports for work or study;
- Create single or multiple sheet templates such as list templates, agenda templates and business templates;
- Quickly recreate already used files in terms of amendments and changes;

Additionally, support may exist for other native features unique to the word processing application.

== Specific commands and file formats ==
Word processing document creation may ordinarily (although not necessarily) begin with selecting a template with a menu command such as: File > New > Templates (and select the template you wish to use), where the user is given the option of selecting a pre-existing template. Similar commands are provided for creating and editing templates.

Template files may restrict users from saving changes with the original file name, such as with the case of Microsoft Office (.dot) filename extensions. In those cases, users are prompted to save the file with a new name as if it were a new file.

== See also ==
- Word processing
- Comparison of word processors
- List of word processors
- Template (disambiguation)
- Normal.dot

=== Related comparisons ===
- Configuration file (similar application configuration features for preserving the state of toolbars and menus, as well as other settings).
- Style sheet (a very similar tool)
- Web template (similar fill-in-the-blank and mass-production features, in the context of web development)
- Template (file format) (similar fill-in-the blank and GUI configuration features, but for spreadsheets, image processing software and other desktop applications)
