= Ciencia Puerto Rico =

Non-profit science organization

- Abbreviation: CienciaPR
- Formation: January 2006; 20 years ago
- Founder: Daniel Colón Ramos
- Type: Nonprofit
- Registration no.: 63962
- Region served: Puerto Rico
- Official language: Spanish, English
- Exec. Dir.: Greetchen Diaz
- Website: https://www.cienciapr.org/en

Ciencia Puerto Rico (or CienciaPR) is US-based non-profit organization that advocates for science in Puerto Rico and supports Puerto Rican researchers. Their online community of more than 17,000 researchers, educators, students, and allies work to show that science can empower people to improve their lives and society. They provide resources in both English and Spanish.

== Leadership ==
Ciencia Puerto Rico was founded by Daniel Colón Ramos in 2006. Giovanna Guerrero-Medina was its first executive director and Greetchen Diaz began as Executive Director in 2024.

== Impact and Collaborations ==
As of 2015, CienciaPR was the most popular science and science jobs website in Puerto Rico. That year, CienciaPR was recognized as a Bright Spot in Hispanic Education by the White House Initiative on Educational Excellence for Hispanics. In 2018, CienciaPR was named Science Defender by the Union of Concerned Scientists.

Although CienciaPR was planning a project to radically improve STEM education in Puerto Rico, the 2017 Atlantic hurricane season slowed down their progress and changed their focus. They now provide disaster-related STEM lessons in addition to their other resources. These lessons involve project-based learning.

CienciaPR was used as a model for a diversity initiative at Yale University, called the Yale Ciencia Initiative. The two programs received a joint grant from the US National Science Foundation to study the impact of the disaster-related STEM lessons in Puerto Rico after Hurricane Irma and Hurricane Maria.

CienciaPR has also worked with the AAAS Caribbean Division on a conference and on advocacy related to Puerto Rican science policy.

== Published works ==
- González Espada, Wilson J.; Colón Ramos, Daniel A.; Feliú Mójer, Mónica I., eds. (2011). ¡Ciencia Boricua!: Ensayos y anécdotas del científico puertorro [Boricua Science!: Essays and Anecdotes of the Puerto Rican Scientist]. San Juan, Puerto Rico: Editorial Callejón. p. 246. ISBN 978-1982060251.
