= Peter Lange (academic) =

Provost of Duke University
- In office 1999 – July 1, 2014
- Preceded by: John Strohbehn
- Succeeded by: Sally Kornbluth

Personal details
- Education: Oberlin College (BA); Massachusetts Institute of Technology (PhD)

Peter Lange is an American academic and the former Provost of Duke University, serving three terms from 1999 to 2014. As Provost, Lange oversaw the creation of Duke Kunshan University in China, and two five-year strategic plans. His tenure included building interdisciplinary institutes and new library and arts facilities. Lange was the university's longest-serving provost, and also served as a professor of political science.

Lange resigned in 2014, and was succeeded by Sally Kornbluth.
