= Henry Van Ingen =

Dutch-American painter

- Born: Hendrik van Ingen; 12 November 1833; The Hague
- Died: 17 November 1898 (aged 65); United States
- Occupation: Art teacher
- Known for: Vassar School of Art

Henry Van Ingen (12 November 1833, The Hague - 17 November 1898, Poughkeepsie, New York) was a Dutch painter who for many years taught art at Vassar College in the United States.

== Career ==
Hendrik van Ingen studied at the Hague Academy of Design from 1844, when he was 10 or 11 years old, to 1850. His main interest was landscape painting under the tutelage of Hendrik van de Sande Bakhuyzen. In 1861 he moved to the United States and obtained a position teaching art at the University of Rochester. In 1866 he married Josephine Koelmann, also from The Hague.

In 1865 Van Ingen was given charge of the School of art at Vassar College, at first the only member of the faculty. The Vassar College Art Gallery opened that year under his direction. The students used it as a studio, and at times copied the paintings. He remained at Vassar for the remainder of his life, living in a small house near the campus with occasional trips back to Europe. Under his leadership the school grew from an initial curriculum of practical studio exercises to include studies of art history and criticism. He also was instrumental in the school building a valuable collection of oils, paper sketches and plaster casts. Van Ingen died of heart problems on 17 November 1898.

== Work ==
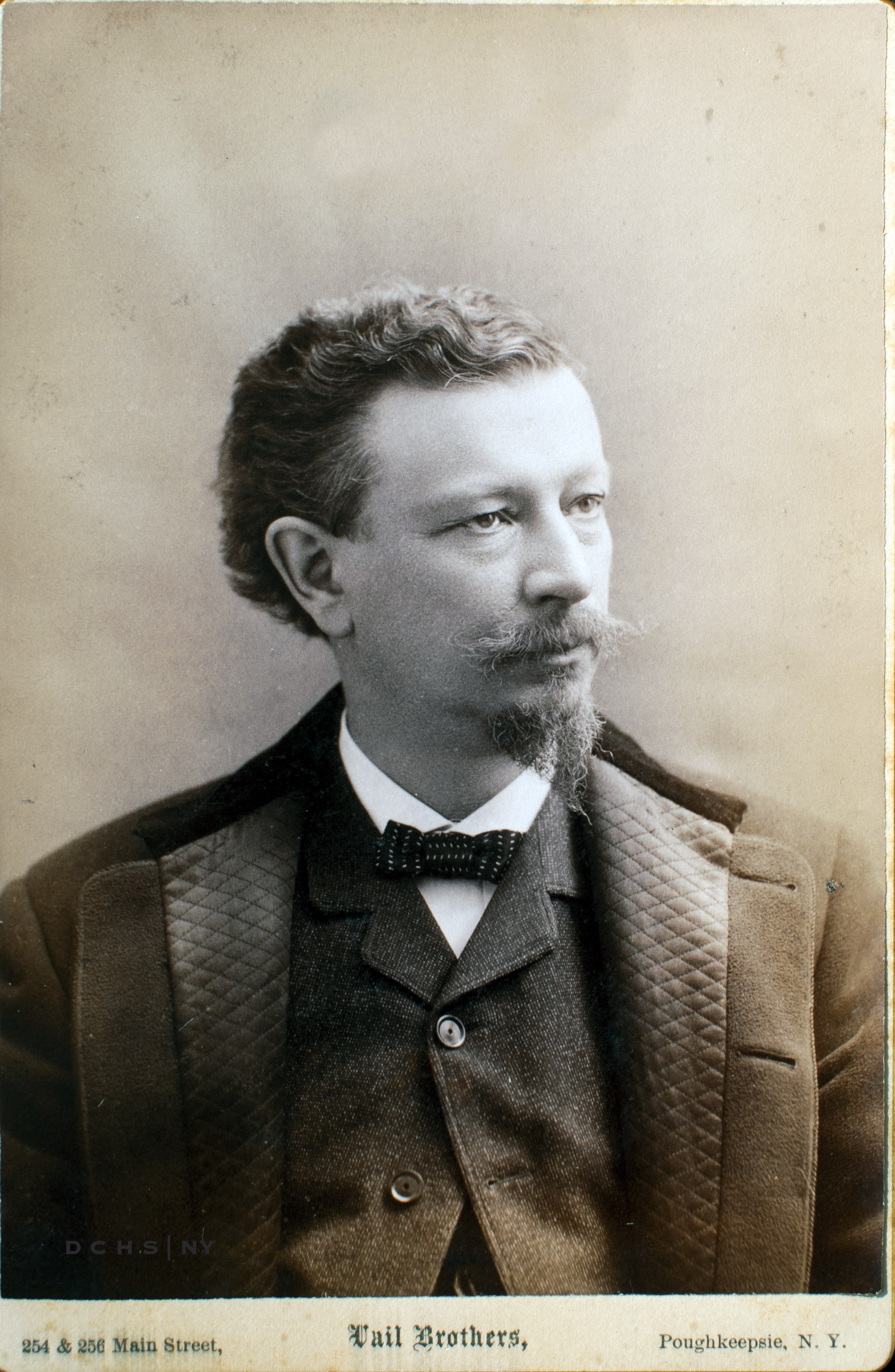
Henry Van Ingen, c. 1877. Dutchess County Historical Society.

Van Ingen was deeply influenced by The Hague School, a movement that emphasized traditional Dutch subjects such as interiors and landscapes. These were the main themes of his work, but were adapted to the scenery of the Hudson River Valley. Some of his animal paintings such as Eagle (1873) and View of Washington’s Headquarters (1883) were entirely American in their themes. He used a wide array of colors and strong, perhaps impressionistic, brushstrokes. He was described by one of his students as a "burly Dutchman reared within sound of Antwerp chimes - [He] has a homely, kindly face and very approachable manners, but stands no nonsense".

== See also ==
- Wilhelmina van Ingen Elarth
