= Boilerplate clause =

Legal English term

A boilerplate clause is a legal English term that is used in conjunction with contract law. When forming contracts, parties to the contract often use templates or forms with boilerplate clauses (boilerplate language, used as standard language). Such clauses refers to the standardized clauses in contracts, and they are to be found towards the end of the agreement. Including boilerplate clauses is the process by which parties to the contract may better define their relationship and the will to provide certainty if terms in the contract are ever disputed. Boilerplate clauses are standard contractual terms that are routinely included in many contracts. Some of the most common clause types are listed below:

== Assignment clause ==
The common law does not permit assignment of the burden of a contract (i.e. contractual obligations) without the consent of other contracting parties. The benefit of a contract (i.e. contractual rights) may be assigned without the consent of the other contracting parties.

An assignment clause either expressly prohibits or permits transfers of rights or obligations under the contract to a third party to the contract.

An example:

Neither this Agreement nor any of the rights, interests or obligations under the Agreement shall be assigned, in whole or in part, by operation of law or otherwise by either party without the prior written consent of the other party.

A transfer may be prohibited or permitted entirely or in part. Where a contract contains separate and severable obligations, only part of the contract may be transferred. Classes of contract which cannot be assigned which include contracts for personal services, such as contracts of employment.

The example of permitting assignment under specified circumstances is:

An example: The hulls and freight clauses contain a similar "assignment clause" which states that no assignment is binding unless a dated notice of assignment, signed by the assured is endorsed on the policy and the policy is produced before payment of claim or return of premium.

== Force majeure clause ==
A force majeure clause is designed to protect against failures to perform contractual obligations caused by unavoidable events beyond a party’s control, such as natural disasters. Force majeure clauses are primarily used to identify circumstances in which performance of contract may be forgiven.

An example:

GUMBER & PARTNERS SOLICITORS shall in no event be responsible for any delay or failure in performance resulting from circumstances beyond its reasonable control.

== Arbitration clause ==
A specific boilerplate clause which is stated to forgo taking any dispute that may arise to court. Parties to the contract are to refer the dispute to an arbitrator to reach out-of-court settlement.

An example:

In the event a dispute shall arise between the parties hereto, it is hereby agreed that the dispute shall be referred to International Chamber of Commerce and settled by three arbitrators. The arbitrators' decision shall be final and binding.

== Severability clause ==
Severability clause provides that in the event of one or more provisions of the contract are determined to be unenforceable, the rest of the contract remains in force.

An example:

This Agreement will be enforced to the fullest extent permitted by applicable law. If for any reason any term or provision of this Agreement is held to be invalid or unenforceable to any extent, then (a) such term or provision will be interpreted, construed, or reformed to the extent reasonably required to render the same valid, enforceable, and consistent with the original intent underlying such provision; (b) such term or provision will remain in effect to the extent that it is not invalid or unenforceable; and (c) such invalidity or unenforceability will not affect any other term or provision of this Agreement.
