= Mariano A. Garcia-Blanco =

Mariano A. Garcia-Blanco is a researcher and academic in the field of biological sciences. He is known for his work with RNA proteins. He focuses on RNA-protein interactions and how they affect pathogenic RNA viruses and human immune system responses.

== Early life and education ==
Born in Hato Rey, Puerto Rico, Garcia-Blanco graduated from Colegio San Ignacio de Loyola in San Juan, Puerto Rico. He attended Harvard College and received his MD and PhD in Molecular Biophysics and Biochemistry from Yale University. He received his Postdoctoral fellowship from Massachusetts Institute of Technology.

== Career ==
Mariano A. Garcia-Blanco started his careers as a Professor and Chair of Biochemistry and Molecular Biology at the University of Texas Medical Branch at Galveston. His laboratory works on RNA viruses and autoimmune diseases. In the lab, he focuses on identifying host factors that impact the infection with pathogenic flaviviruses by utilizing an en masse approach. At the Duke-NUS Graduate Medical School in Singapore, he was Professor of Emerging Infectious Diseases. He was appointed chair of the Department of Microbiology, Immunology and Cancer Biology on January 1, 2023, and is the F. Palmer Weber Medical Research Professor at the University of Virginia.

Throughout his career, Garcia-Blanco has published over 170 articles, chapters, and reviews. He was inspired by American molecular biologist, Nobel prize winner, Phillip A. Sharp. He is part of several professional organizations, including a member of Association of American Physicians, a fellow of the American Association for the Advancement of Science, and a fellow the American Academy of Microbiology. In 2022, Garcia-Blanco was elected the American Academy of Arts & Sciences.
