= Ingen (disambiguation) =

Ingen may refer to:

- Ingen Ryūki (1592-1673), Buddhist monk
- Ingen, Netherlands, a village
- InGen, a fictional genetics company from Jurassic Park
- Nathan Ingen, Papuan Anglican bishop
- "Daughter of" in Irish names such as Sabdh ingen Gluniarainn mac Murchada, abbess of Kildare, 1132–
- Van Ingen, a Dutch surname
