= Wilhelmina van Ingen Elarth =

American archaeologist, and art historian

Wilhelmina van Ingen Elarth (1905-1969) was an archaeologist and art history and classical studies professor. She studied at Vassar and received her doctorate at Radcliffe. In addition to her research contributions to the classics, she also bridged her interest to contemporary art and architecture. Her grandfather was Henry van Ingen.

== Early life ==
Van Ingen was a second-generation American after her grandfather, Hudson River School painter Henry van Ingen, emigrated to the US. She was born in Rochester, New York, in 1905. Her father was the architect Hendrik van Ingen.

== Education ==
Van Ingen received her undergraduate degree at Vassar in 1926 before traveling to Greece to study at the American School of Classical Studies, participating in excavations at Eleusis. She continued her education back in the US at Radcliffe College with a master's degree in art history and classical archaeology in 1929.

In 1932, when she graduated from Radcliffe with a doctorate, her dissertation was titled "A Study of the Foundry Painter and the Alkimachos Painter."

== Controversy ==
Van Ingen was one of the female archaeology students working under David M. Robinson in 1927, along with her fellow researcher, Eunice Stebbins. During her time in Greece, she wrote around 90 letters to her mother, which are now stored in the archives at Virginia Tech. As she attempted to earn her PhD under Robinson, she found conflict in his style, both professionally as an excavator, and as a mentor. They parted ways in 1928 when she moved to Harvard-Radcliffe.

== Career and private life ==
Van Ingen held position as a researcher at University of Michigan's Institute of Archaeological Research. Van Ingen taught at Wheaton College as an art professor from 1935 to 1946. During her tenure, she married Herschel A. Elarth (1942), an architect like her father and a professor of architecture at University of Oklahoma.

The couple moved to Manitoba in 1947, with both finding positions at the University of Manitoba, hers in art history.

In 1954, the couple moved to Blacksburg, Virginia, when Herschel received a position in the art department of Virginia Tech. Van Ingen supported a variety of groups, including:

- American Association of University Women (branch president for Blackburg, 1964 to 1966)
- Blacksburg Regional Art Association (advisor)
- Associated Endowment Fund of the American School of Classical Studies (director)
- Archaeological Institute of America (member)
- the College Art Association (member)
- Phi Beta Kappa (member)

Van Ingen Elarth died after a year-long illness on January 7, 1969, in Roanoke.

== Writings ==
- Corpus Vasorum Antiquorum. Cambridge: Harvard University Press, 1933.
- Figurines from Seleucia. Ann Arbor: The University of Michigan Press, 1939.
- "Reply to Critics of Art Exhibit." Winnipeg Tribune, December 1951
- "Milestone for the Manitoba Society" The Manitoba Society of Artists, 1938-1955
