= The Engine (organization) =

U.S. nonprofit startup accelerator

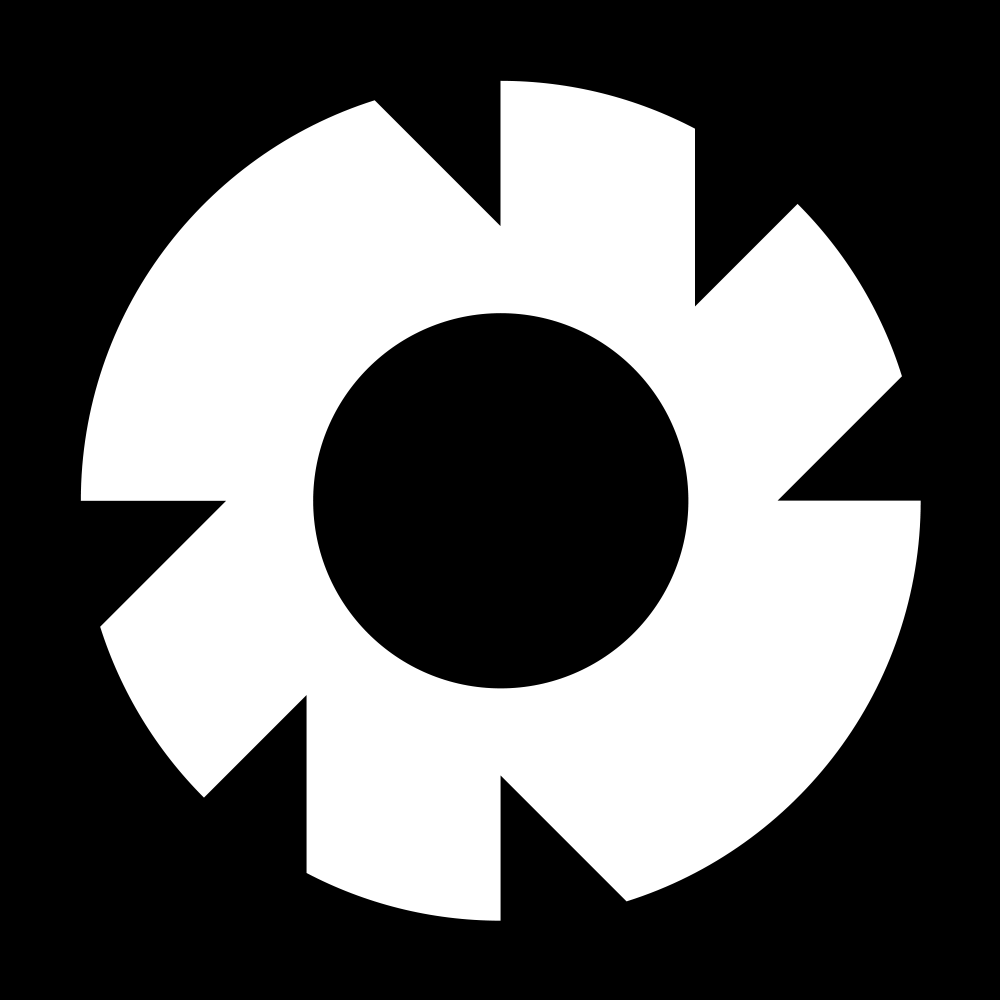
- Company type: Nonprofit
- Industry: Startup accelerator
- Founded: Cambridge, Massachusetts, United States (2016)
- Headquarters: Cambridge, Massachusetts
- Key people: Emily Knight (CEO, President); Benjamin Downing (Chief Growth Officer); Katherine Otway (Chief Marketing Officer); Ian Johnston (Vice President of Tech Translation and Ecosystem Development); Sue Siegel (Board Chair); Paula T. Hammond (Board Member); Linda Pizzuti Henry (Board Member); Brad Powell (Board Member); Jeremy Wertheimer (Board Member); Glen Shor (Board Member); Angela Koehler (Board Member); Mick Mountz (Board Member); Thomas Kalil (Board Member)
- Products: BSL-2 wet labs, fabrication spaces, office space, mentorship programs, tech translation programs, networking events
- Website: engine.xyz

The Engine is a nonprofit incubator and accelerator for early-stage deep tech startups, founded by MIT in 2016 and headquartered in Cambridge, Massachusetts.

The Engine has supported hundreds of companies, which have collectively raised $5.5B in funding. Former resident companies and program participants include Commonwealth Fusion Systems and Form Energy.

== About ==
The Engine specializes in supporting startups developing hardware-based technologies across deep tech fields including biotech, robotics, green energy, agriculture, manufacturing, material science, and quantum computing. Collectively, The Engine refers to the technologies it incubates as "tough tech."

The Engine provides resident startups with shared access to wet labs, fabrication space, machine shops and office space. It also offers programs to help scientists and engineers learn business and leadership skills, and hosts events to convene investors, policymakers, and business leaders.

== History ==
On October 26, 2016, MIT launched The Engine as both an investment fund and accelerator space to support startup companies working on technology for addressing global challenges.

The Engine opened its first headquarters in Cambridge's Central Square and closed its first investment fund for over $150 million in April 2017, with $25 million committed by MIT. In September 2017, The Engine selected its first cohort of seven startups to invest in.

The Engine hosted its first Tough Tech Summit in Boston in October 2018. The event has since been held every year and was expanded in 2024 to be included within a Tough Tech Week, featuring a series of events across the Greater Boston area.

In August 2019, The Engine announced that it would begin construction on a 200,000 square foot expansion of shared office, fabrication, and lab space. in the old Polaroid building at 750 Main Street in Cambridge. The new space would expand The Engine's capacity to host over 100 companies, employing at least 1,000 people, across both locations. The new facility opened its doors in the summer of 2022.

In 2023, the investment fund separated from The Engine and rebranded as the venture capital firm Engine Ventures.

The National Science Foundation granted $9.5 million to The Engine in September 2023 to develop, launch and run The Builder Platform to support its inaugural Regional Innovation Engines. The Builder Platform provides resources, community and advisory services to support nine Regional Innovation Engines across the United States.
