= Boilerplate text =

Standard template of written text

Boilerplate text, or simply boilerplate, is any written text (copy) that can be reused in new contexts or applications without significant changes to the original. The term is used for statements, contracts, and source code, and is often used pejoratively to refer to clichéd or unoriginal writing.

== Etymology ==
"Boiler plate" originally referred to the rolled steel used to make boilers to heat water. Metal printing plates (type metal) used in hot metal typesetting of prepared text such as advertisements or syndicated columns were distributed to small, local newspapers, and became known as 'boilerplates' by analogy. One large supplier to newspapers of this kind of boilerplate was the Western Newspaper Union, which supplied "ready-to-print stories" that "contained national or international news" to papers with smaller geographic footprints, which could include advertisements pre-printed next to the conventional content.

== Boilerplate language ==
In contract law, the term "boilerplate language" or "boilerplate clause" describes the parts of a contract that are considered standard. A standard form contract or boilerplate contract is a contract between two parties, where the terms and conditions of the contract are set by one of the parties, and the other party has little or no ability to negotiate more favorable terms and is thus placed in a "take it or leave it" position.

Boilerplate language may also exist in pre-created form letters. The person sending the form letter usually only needs to add their name at the end of the pre-written greeting and body. Typically, the sender of such a letter needs to personalize it minimally, often by adding their name or specific details to a pre-written greeting and body, making these templates highly practical for mass communication or repetitive correspondence.

== Boilerplate code ==
In computer programming, boilerplate is the sections of code that have to be included in many places with little or no alteration. Such boilerplate code is particularly salient when the programmer must include a lot of code for minimal functionality.

A related phenomenon, bookkeeping code, is code that is not part of the business logic, but is interleaved with it to keep data structures updated or to handle secondary aspects of the program.

== Boilerplate statement ==
A boilerplate statement or response generally refers to a message used with minimal effort for multiple different situations. Examples include messages left by companies' voicemail such as "Thank you for holding. Your call is very important to us."

== See also ==
- Canned response
- Clipboard manager
- Library (computer science)
- Snippet management
- Template processors are used to generate boilerplate text automatically
- Transpromotional
