= Ingen, Netherlands =

Ingen
- Village
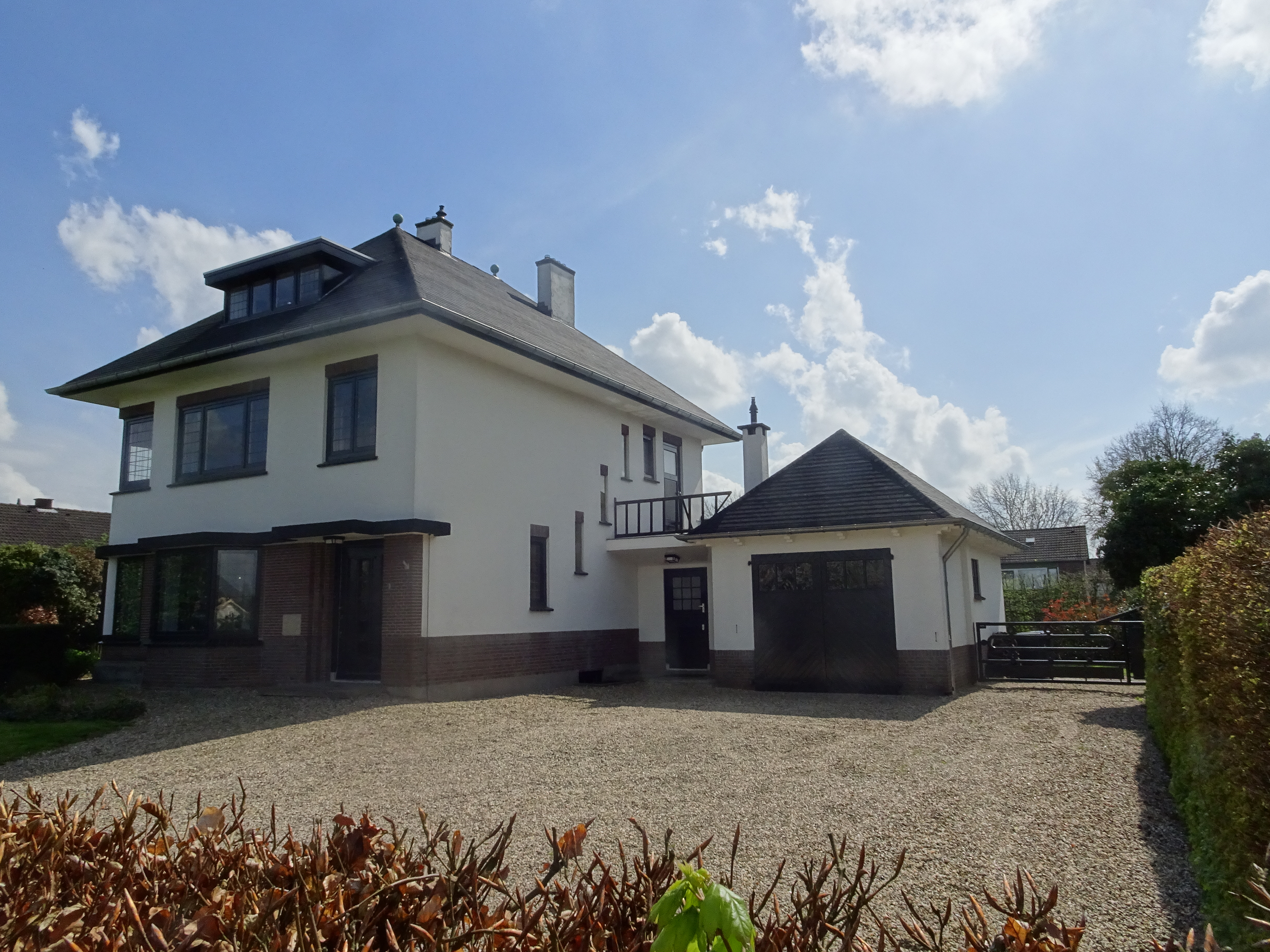
- Former clergy house in Ingen

- Location in the province of Gelderland Ingen (Netherlands)
- Coordinates: 51°58′N 5°29′E
- Country: Netherlands
- Province: Gelderland
- Municipality: Buren

Area
  - Total: 0.75 km^{2} (0.29 sq mi)
- Elevation: 7 m (23 ft)

Population (2021)
  - Total: 1,050
  - Density: 1,400/km^{2} (3,600/sq mi)
- Time zone: UTC+1 (CET)
  - Summer (DST): UTC+2 (CEST)
- Postal code: 4031
- Dialing code: 0344

Ingen is a village in the Dutch province of Gelderland. It is a part of the municipality of Buren, and lies about 9 km south-west of Veenendaal. Before 1999 the town was part of the municipality of Lienden from 1818 till 1999. The houses are widely spread into a bowl form. The houses link to the townships De Ganzert and Eck en Wiel in the West.

== History ==
In 1026, the village was known as Heiningen. Heiningen refers to Hangim, roughly akin to “Near The Holy”. Another possibility is that it's not Heiningen but Einingen, which could refer to the meadows of the village. Some people also think that Heiningen isn't the village of Ingen and that Ingen is named in records for the first time in the 14th age. The name could then come from Ingeborg, a god of the Vikings, or from the family Ingenhe from the 13th age.

== Limes ==
The limes was the border of the Roman Empire. The limes was a connection between the Castella (forts) of the northern part of the Roman Empire. It was used as a highway to move the legions between the forts along the border. Geographical research shows that Ingen lies next to this road.

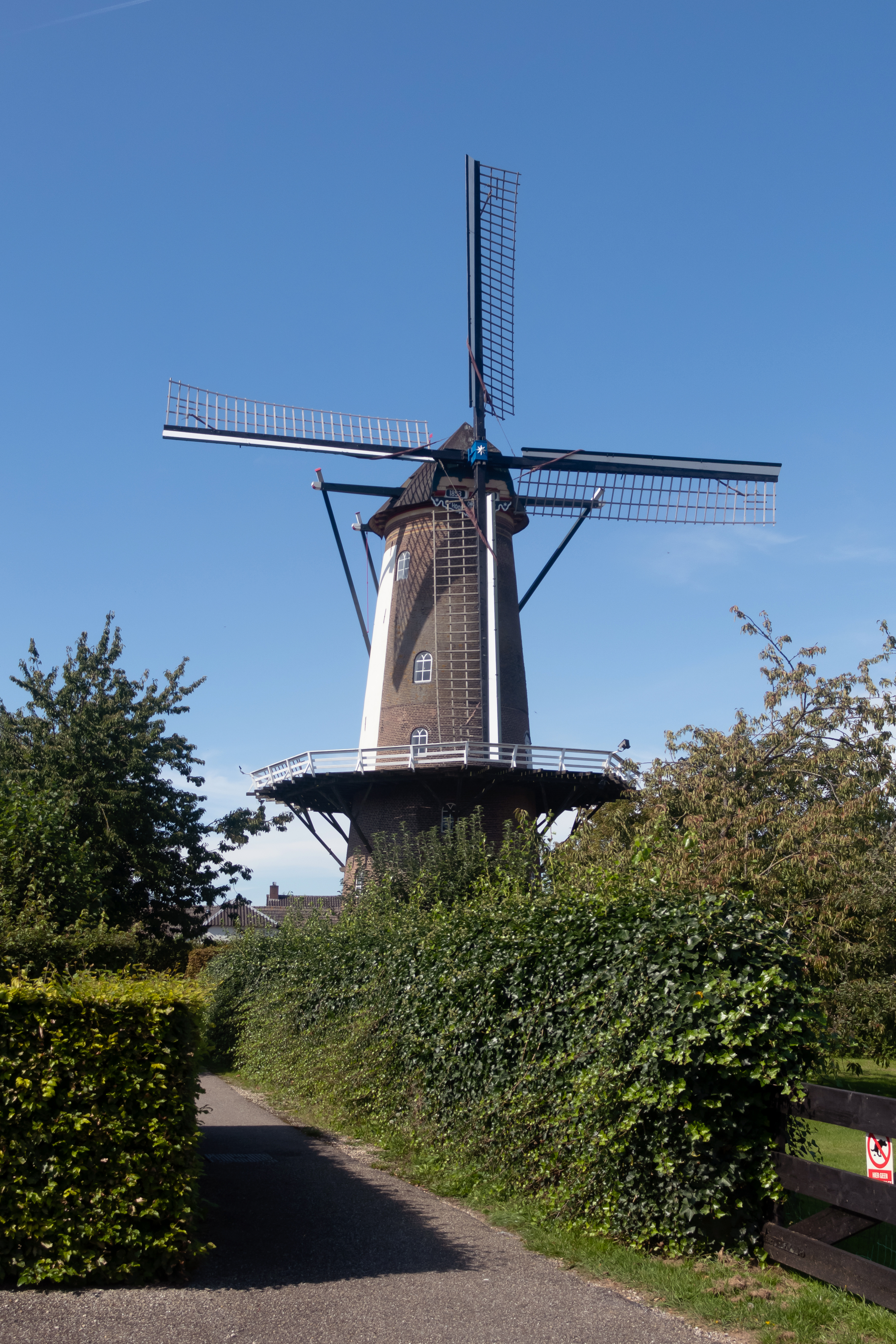
Windmill: stellingmolen Op Hoop Van Beter

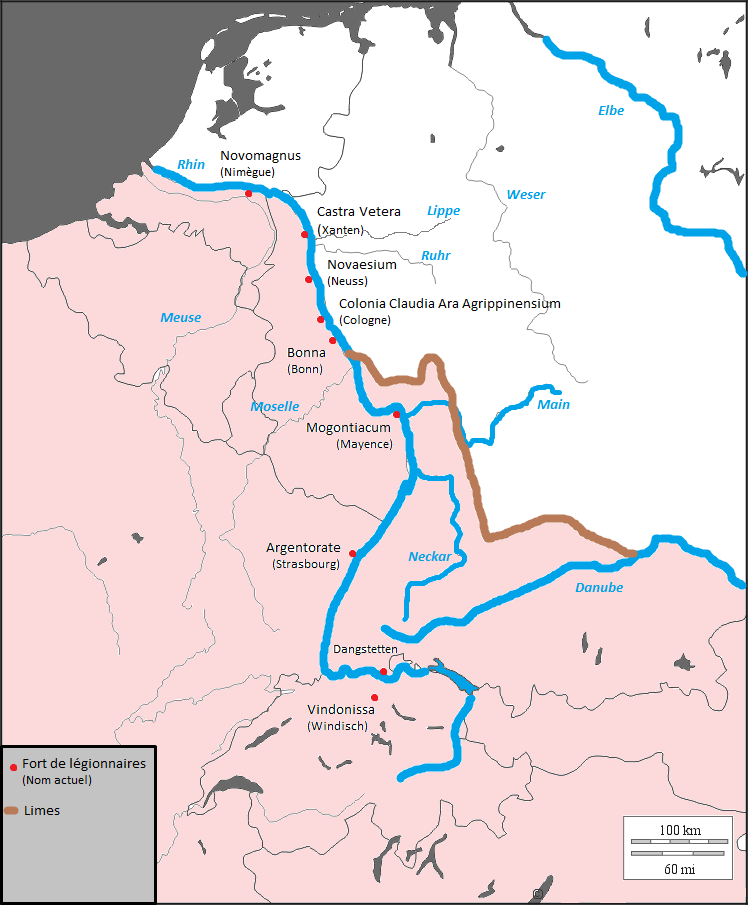
Location of the German Limes in connection with the present borders of states.

== Church ==
Already in 1248, the church of Ingen is named in a charter. Nowadays, the church is Dutch reformed. The church was dedicated to Lambert of Maastricht. The church had three altars in 1495. The history of the church is connected to the Commandry of St. John, a historic building in Nijmegen. The first record of the order is in 1317. The insignia of the order can be found on a pillar in the church. In the 15th century, there has been a huge renovation. In the 17th century, the church was partially destroyed in a fire. Also in the 19th century the church had some problems. In the 1990s the church was renovated extensively again. The church features a baptismal font, likely dating from the 12th century, as well as many paintings.

== Ferry ==
The village is built next to the river Nederrijn, a branch of the Rhine in the Netherlands. In 1486 there already was a pedestrian ferry, to make transport across the river more easy. King William I of the Netherlands gave the owners permission to upgrade the pedestrian ferry to a pontoon ferry in 1821. The ferry and the ferryboat were then known as Ingensche Veer. The ferry line is still there today and has a new (2003) ferryboat in service called Geldersweert. The name Geldersweert refers to a castle that stood west of the ferry in a floodplain. The ferry had always been property of noble families, until 1912. The last noble owner was Anne Willen Jacob Joost Baron van Nagell, who inter alia was a chamberlain of King William III of the Netherlands. He sold the ferry to his exploitant, Frans Spies. This family still owns the ferry nowadays.

=== WWII ===
During WWII, the family Spies had to evacuate from the ferry house, in September 1944. The Germans manned the ferry, and the citizens weren't allowed to cross the Rhine any more. The Germans even used the old ferryboat a little further upwards the Rhine and placed it between Elst and Rhenen. They also placed 30 pieces of anti-aircraft. The Germans called the ferry house 'the Haunted House' during the war, because the ferry and the house were attacked three times a day by British fighter-bombers, but neither was ever hit. A few weeks before the liberation, the Allies also began bombarding from Ede, what resulted in a grenade that came into the facade and the roof of the ferry house. The old ferryboat was hit by a V1.

== World War II ==
During World War II, Ingen did not see or feel the violence of the war even though it lies very close to the Grebbeberg. The Grebbeberg is a 50.2-metre high hill that was the central defensive point in 1940 for the centre and the west of the Netherlands. This hill was difficult to capture and a very good observation post for the troops. The Germans launched an assault on the Grebbeberg with heavy artillery but the Dutch soldiers remarkably defended the Grebbeberg with almost nothing to defend them with. No evacuation was possible for the inhabitants of Ingen because the area of Ingen, Lienden and Ommeren was right in the middle of the battle and the area could not be lost. But on 12 May 1940 the Dutch soldiers retreated to the Nieuwe Hollandse Waterlinie. And on 15 May, the Netherlands surrendered. This fast capitulation has spared Ingen of the German violence. The German soldiers went through Ingen but that was all.

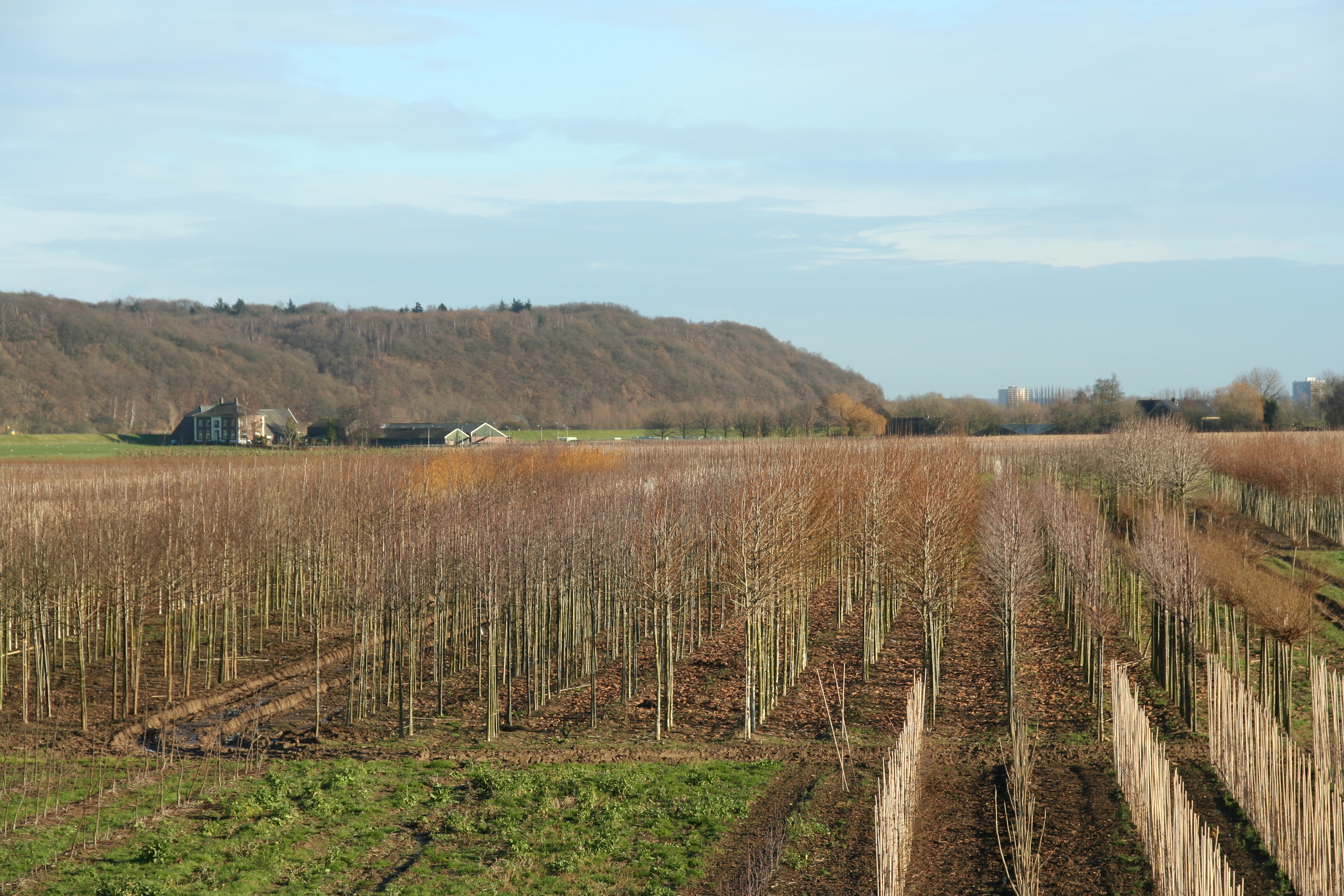
Grebbeberg, the Netherlands, seen from the south.

And also in 1944, in the airborne operation on Arnhem, Ingen was of no strategical use. But on the night of 3 December 1944 the Germans used an old Dutch defence: they destroyed the dikes of the Rhine south of Arnhem. The whole Neder-Betuwe flooded. On 7 December, the water reached Ingen. Because of the water, the waterworks began to malfunction. The bad water caused scabies and typhus. The Germans fled to the northern shore of the Rhine. On 22 December the water began to flow back. But the Germans came back too. They took the last cattle and possessions the inhabitants had. In February, the water came back again. And again the Germans fled to the northern shore of the Rhine. This time the water stayed for four weeks. On 4 May, everything was over, the Germans capitulated in the Netherlands.

In April 1946 Kinge van der Linden sang a song with the Metropole Orkest conducted by Dolf van der Linden. The song would gain national prominence. A part of the song translated into English goes like this: Once the Betuwe will be in bloom again, and will grow as one big, yellow grain.

== Economy ==
Ingen lies next to the river Nederrijn and is thereby a very fertile area, which is a home to many orchards. The horticulture is characteristic for Ingen.

The first decade after World War II is known as the golden decade for Ingen. The government pushed the agriculture to a higher level because they wanted to compete on the world market with other countries. They mechanised the agriculture, resulting in a higher production. But where other farms in the Netherlands became bigger 'companies', in the Betuwe the number of farmers with between 1 hectare (approximately 2.5 acres) and 5 hectares (approximately 12.4 acres) has risen to around 96 percent. The inhabitants had a good time too: in 1950 0.9 litres of beer per capita was consumed and in 1960 23.9 litres.

== Population ==
In 2001, the village of Ingen had 758 inhabitants. The built-up area of the village was 0.15 km^{2}, and contained 266 residences. The statistical area "Ingen", which also can include the peripheral parts of the village, as well as the surrounding countryside, has a population of around 1,010.

In 2011, the municipality of Buren had 26,013 inhabitants. In 2008, Ingen had 795 inhabitants.

== Sources ==
- Maike van Stiphout, Marieke Berkers and Jan Kolen (2008), Limes, Architectura&Natura, kaart 14, pg. 16, ISBN 9789076863504
- Chris van Esterik, Een jongen van het dorp - Honderd jaar Ingen, een dorp in de Betuwe, Bert Bakker, ISBN 9789035125995
