= Wayne B. Nottingham =

American scientist and engineer

Wayne Buckles Nottingham
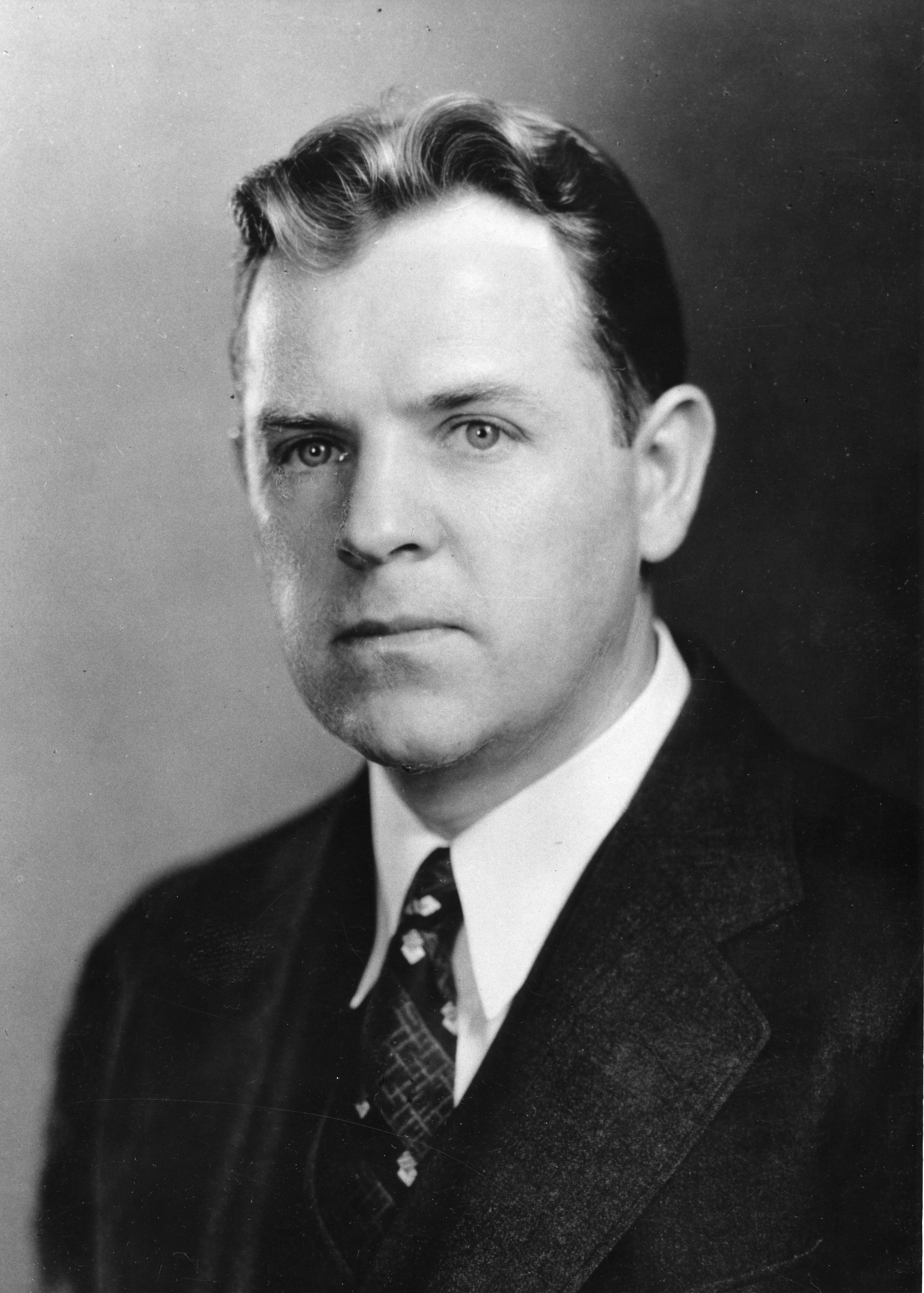
- Portrait 1937
- Born: 17 April 1899; Tipton. United States
- Died: 4 December 1964 (aged 65); Aerdenhout, Netherlands
- Education: Princeton University
- Known for: Nottingham effect Nottingham gauge
- Scientific career
- Fields: Solid state physics
- Workplaces: MIT
- Thesis: Normal arc characteristic curves: Dependence on absolute temperature of anode (1929)
- Doctoral advisor: Karl Taylor Compton

Wayne B. Nottingham (17 April 1899 – 4 December 1964) was a US physics professor at Massachusetts Institute of Technology (MIT), Principal Investigator of the Research Laboratory of Electronics, specialized on electronics, field electron emission, thermionics, photoelectrics and low pressure equipment. The Nottingham effect in field electron emission is named after him.

== Life ==
Wayne Buckles Nottingham was born in Tipton, Indiana, United States in 1899.

He made his Bachelor of Science in Purdue University and in 1921 he went to Uppsala University in Sweden under a Benjamin Franklin Transatlantic fellowship by The American-Scandinavian Foundation. Upon his return he joined what later became the Bell Labs in New Jersey.

Nottingham received a master's degree from Princeton University in 1926 and continued there as PhD student under the supervision of Karl Taylor Compton. He defended his thesis in 1929. The same year, he was also awarded the degree of electrical engineer by Purdue.

As a postdoctoral researcher, Nottingham worked as a Bartol Research Fellow at the Franklin Institute in Pennsylvania.

Nottingham joined the Massachusetts Institute of Technology (MIT) in 1931 as assistant professor. He was promoted to associate professor in 1936, and to professor in 1942.

Nottingham devised the Nottingham gauge, an electronic pressure measuring device which operated in vacuum of about 10^{−10} millimetre of mercury.

In 1935, he organized and conducted the first Physical Electronics Conference (PEC) at MIT.

During World War II, he served as a special representative of the MIT Radiation Laboratory to the federal Office of Scientific Research and Development in Washington D. C.

Nottingham retired in July 1964 and proceeded to do a tour of Europe presenting his work, in company of his wife. Nottingham died in December in Aerdenhout, Netherlands.

== Awards, honors and fellowships ==
Nottingham was a fellow of the American Academy of Arts and Sciences and a member of the Institute of Electrical and Electronic Engineers, the Optical Society of America and the American Physical Society (APS) in 1931.

Nottingham was awarded the Louis E. Levy medal in Engineering of the Franklin Institute in 1932.

The Wayne B. Nottingham Prize was established in 1966 in Nottingham's honor by the Physical Electronics Conference (PEC), awarded to best papers in electronics during the conference.

== Books ==
- Nottingham, Wayne Buckles (1956). Thermionic Emission. Massachusetts Institute of Technology, Research Laboratory of Electronics.
