= James Blythe Rogers =

American chemist (1802-1852)

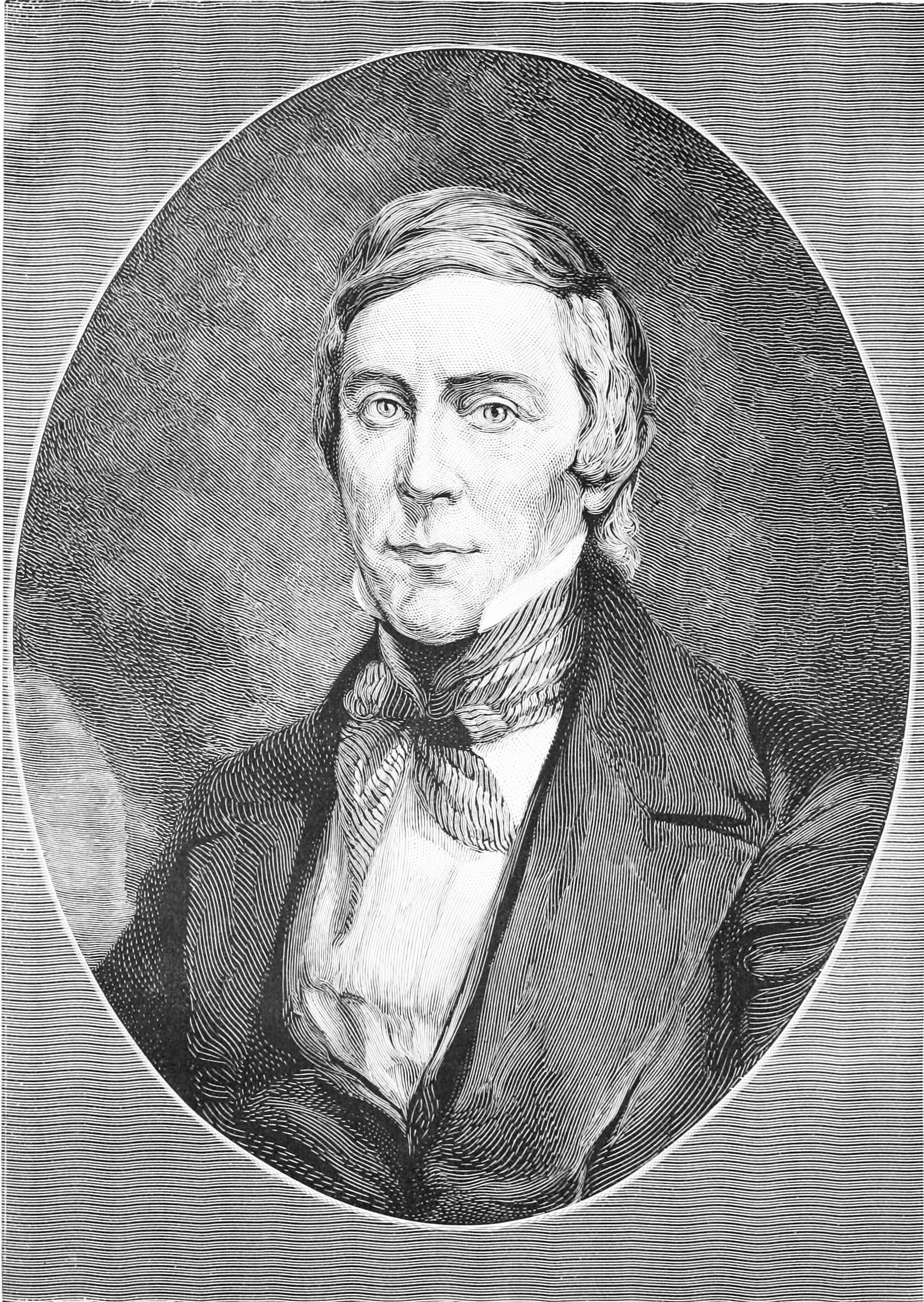

James Blythe Rogers (born in Philadelphia, Pennsylvania, 11 February 1802; died there, 15 June 1852) was a United States chemist.

== Biography ==
He was the eldest son of Patrick Kerr Rogers, who had graduated from the medical department of the University of Pennsylvania in 1802, and in 1819 was elected professor of natural philosophy and mathematics at the College of William & Mary, where he remained until his death. James Rogers was educated at William and Mary, and, after preliminary studies with Dr. Thomas E. Bond, received the degree of M.D. from the University of Maryland in 1822. Subsequently he taught in Baltimore, but soon afterward settled in Little Britain, Lancaster County, Pennsylvania, and there practised medicine.

He found the practice of medicine uncongenial, and returned to Baltimore to become superintendent of a large chemical factory. He devoted himself assiduously to the study of pure and applied chemistry, and became professor of that branch in Washington Medical College, Baltimore, also lecturing on the same subject at the Mechanics' Institute. In 1835 he was called to the same chair in the medical department of Cincinnati College, where he remained until 1839, spending his summer vacations in field work and chemical investigations in connection with the geological survey of Virginia, which was then under the charge of his brother William.

In 1840 he settled permanently in Philadelphia, where he became an assistant to his brother Henry, at that time state geologist of Pennsylvania, and in 1841 he was appointed lecturer on chemistry in the Philadelphia Medical Institute, a summer school. He was elected professor of general chemistry at the Franklin Institute in 1844, and remained there until his election in 1847 to succeed Robert Hare as professor of chemistry in the University of Pennsylvania.

Rogers was a representative at the national medical convention in 1847, and a delegate to the national convention for the revision of the United States Pharmacopeia in 1850, and a member of various learned societies.

== Works ==
He contributed papers to scientific journals, and with his brother Robert prepared the seventh edition of Edward Turner's Elements of Chemistry and William Gregory's Outlines of Organic Chemistry, in one volume (Philadelphia, 1846).
