= Nottingham effect =

Thermal effect of field emission

In condensed matter physics, the Nottingham effect is a surface cooling and heating mechanism that occurs during field and thermionic electron emission. The effect is named after physicist Wayne B. Nottingham who explained it in a commentary to 1940 experiments by Gertrude M. Fleming and Joseph E. Henderson.

The temperature at which electron emission goes from heating to cooling is called the Nottingham inversion temperature.

== Description ==
Notably, the effect can be either heating or cooling of the surface emitting the electrons, depending upon the energy at which they are supplied. Above the Nottingham inversion temperature, the emission energy exceeds the Fermi energy of the electron supply and the emitted electron carries more energy away from the surface than is returned by the supply of a replacement electron, and the net heat flux from the Nottingham effect switches from heating to cooling the cathode.

Along with Joule heating, the Nottingham effect contributes to the thermal equilibrium of electron emission systems, typically becoming the dominant contributor at very high emission current densities. It comes into play in the operation of field emission array cathodes and other devices that rely upon stimulating Fowler-Nordheim electron emission, usually at the apex of a sharp tip used to create a field enhancement effect. In extreme cases, the Nottingham effect can heat the emitter tips to temperatures exceeding the melting point of the tip material, causing the tip to deform and emit material that may cause a vacuum arc; this is a significant failure mode for tip-based cathodes.
