= Hans Geitel =

German physicist

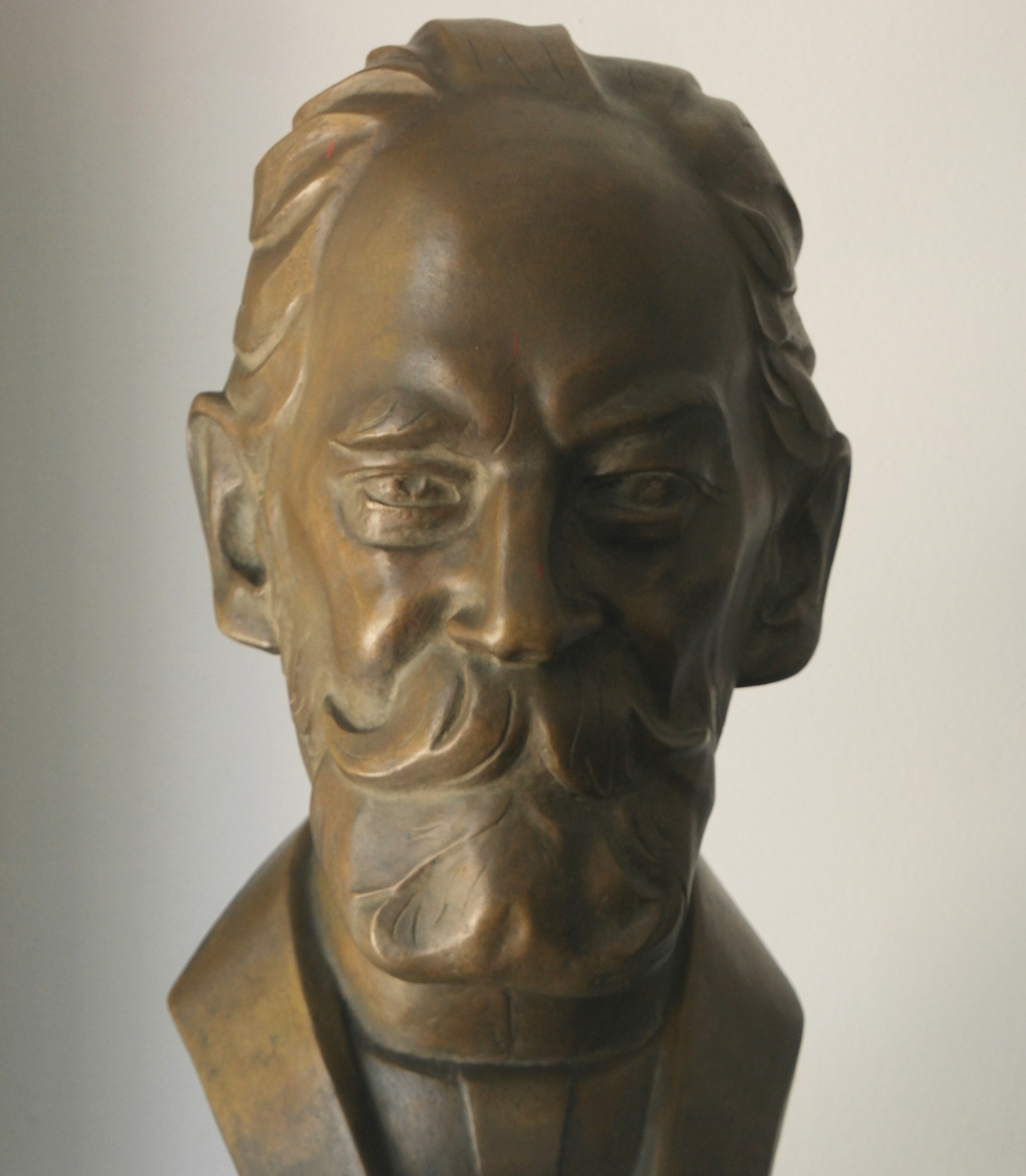
Bust at the Hans-Friedrich Wolfenbüttel GroßeSchule

Hans Friedrich Karl Geitel (16 July 1855 in Braunschweig – 15 August 1923 in Wolfenbüttel) was a German physicist. He is credited with coining the phrase "atomic energy."

== Biography ==
Through the relocation of his family, his father was a forester, Hans Geitel came to Blankenburg in 1861 and grew up in close proximity to Julius Elster. He attended school and high school together with Elster. A lifelong friendship developed between the two of them, their interest in science became a shared field of activity.

During their studies both spent two years in Heidelberg and Berlin. In 1879 Geitel got his teaching degree in Braunschweig and accepted a position as teacher at the then called Herzogliche Große Schule (translation: Ducal Great School) in Wolfenbüttel. In 1881 Geitel succeeded in getting Julius Elster to the school as well. There they intensified their joint researches. Karl Bergwitz (1875–1958), who continued their research, was one of their students there. In 1892 Geitel was elected a member of the German Academy of Sciences Leopoldina.

Julius Elster and Hans Geitel performed key experiments to find the energy source for radioactivity, excluding extraction of energy from air by measurements in a vacuum and extraction of energy from outer space by measurements 300m down a mine in the Harz mountains.

== Publications ==
Geitel and Elster published works on meteorology, nuclear physics, and the photoelectric effects. Geitel recognized the law of radioactive decay in 1899 and coined the term atomic energy. In 1893 he invented the photocell.

== Journals ==
- Elster, Julius and Geitel, Hans: Experiments on Hyperphosphorescenz. addenda to the annals of Physics and Chemistry, 21:455, 1897.
- Elster, Julius and Geitel, Hans: Via the influence of a magnetic field on the Becquerel rays caused by the conductivity of the air negotiations of the German Physical Society, 1:136-138 May, 1899.
- Elster, Julius and Geitel, Hans: About Ozone formation of glowing platinum surfaces and Electrical conductivity of ozonized by phosphorus air. Annals of Physics and Chemistry, 275:321-331, in 1890.
- Elster, Julius and Geitel, Hans: Experiments on Becquerel. Annals of Physics and Chemistry, 302:735-740, in 1898.

== Awards ==
In 1899, Geitel was awarded an honorary doctorate at the University of Göttingen. In 1915 he was, along with Elster, awarded an honorary degree of the Braunschweig University of Technology.

== See also ==
- Photoelectric effect
- Photomultiplier tube
- Thermionic emission
