= Robert Empie Rogers =

American chemist (1813–1884)

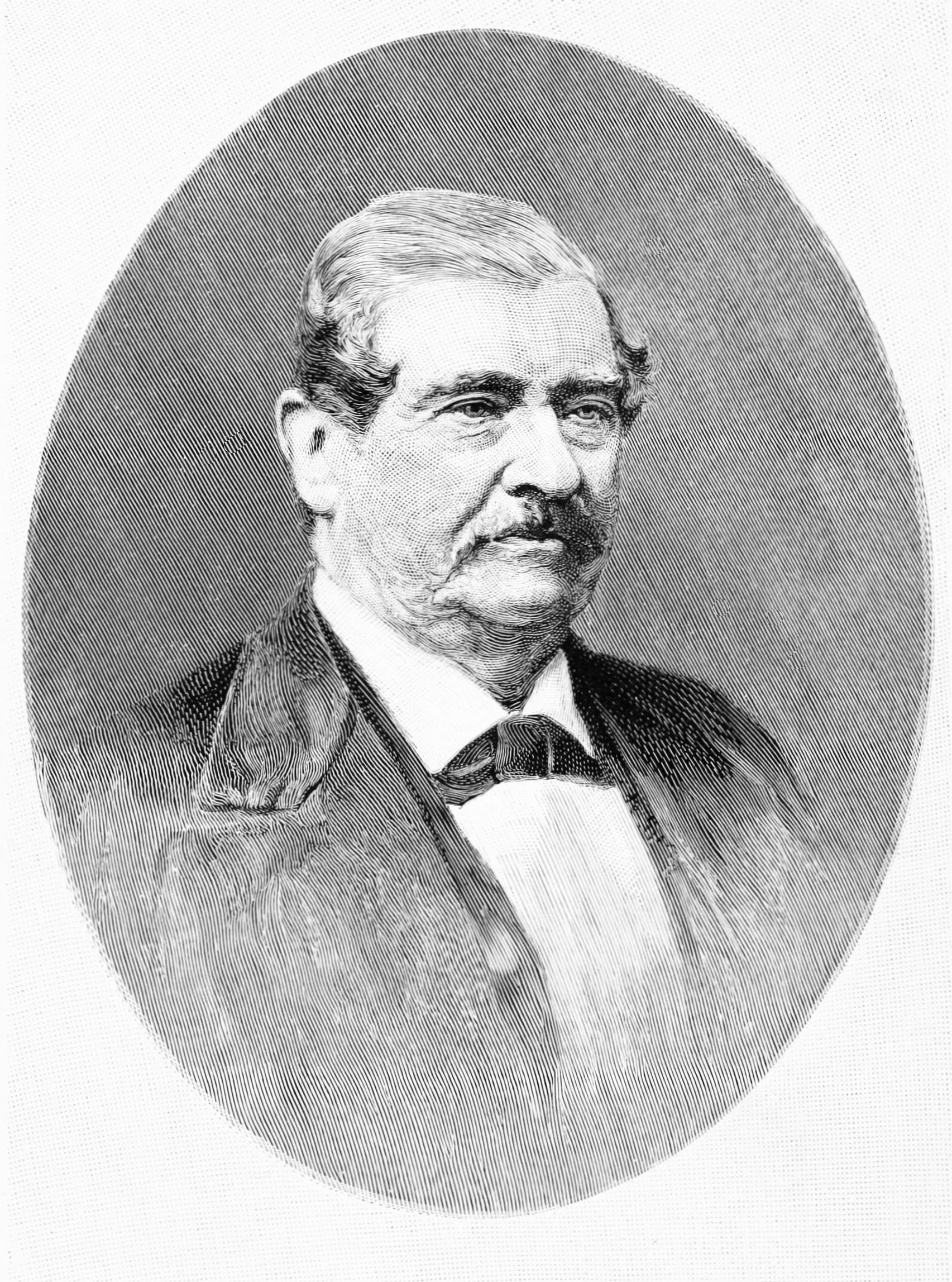
- Born: March 29, 1813; Baltimore, Maryland
- Died: September 6, 1884 (aged 71); Philadelphia, Pennsylvania
- Education: University of Pennsylvania
- Spouses: Fanny Montgomery (m. 1843; died 1863) Delia Saunders (m. 1866; died 1883)

Robert Empie Rogers (March 29, 1813 – September 6, 1884) was an American chemist.

== Biography ==
Rogers was born in Baltimore, Maryland on March 29, 1813. The youngest of four brothers, he was educated first under the care of his father, and then by his elder brothers. It was intended that he should be a civil engineer, and for a time he acted as assistant in the survey of the Boston and Providence Railroad, but he abandoned this in 1833.

He graduated at the medical department of the University of Pennsylvania in 1836, where he followed a full course of chemistry under Robert Hare. The active practice of medicine not being congenial to him, in 1836 he was appointed chemist to the geological survey of Pennsylvania being administered by his brother Henry. He continued in this position for six years. In 1841-42 he was temporary instructor in chemistry at the University of Virginia and was elected, in March 1842, to the professorship of general and applied chemistry and materia medica there. There he remained until 1852, when he was called to succeed his brother James as professor of chemistry at the University of Pennsylvania, where he became dean of the medical faculty in 1856. In 1877 he resigned these appointments to accept the professorship of chemistry and toxicology in Jefferson Medical College, which he then retained till 1884, when he was made professor emeritus.

During the American Civil War, he served as acting assistant surgeon at the West Philadelphia military hospital 1862–63. There he suffered a serious accident which necessitated the amputation of his right hand. In 1864, caught up by the "oil fever" sweeping the United States, he made a significant investment in the Humboldt Oil Company, of which he was one of the founders. By 1873, the investment turned out to be a total loss, his more than anyone's since he was the largest shareholder.

Rogers was appointed in 1872 by the United States Department of the Treasury as one of a commission to examine the melters' and refiners' department of the United States Mint in Philadelphia. He visited the mint in San Francisco in 1873, and in 1874 the assay office in New York, and subsequently until 1879 he was frequently engaged on government commissions for the various mints, making valuable reports, in addition to which he served on the annual assay commissions from 1874 to 1879. From 1872 until his death, he was one of the chemists that were employed by the gas trust of Philadelphia to make analyses and daily photometric tests of the gas.

The degree of LL.D. was conferred on him by Dickinson College in 1877. He was a fellow of the College of Physicians and Surgeons, member of various scientific societies, one of the incorporators of the National Academy of Sciences, and president of the Franklin Institute 1875–79.

Besides various articles in the transactions of the societies of which he was a member, and in scientific journals, he was associated with his brother James in editing Elements of Chemistry (Philadelphia, 1846), and edited Charles G. Lehman's Physiological Chemistry (2 vols., 1855).

In 1843 he married Fanny Montgomery. She died in 1863, and he married Delia Saunders in 1866. There were no children. He died, aged 71, died in Philadelphia, Pennsylvania.
