= The Giant Heart =

Exhibit at the Franklin Institute in Philadelphia

Coordinates: 39.95837°N 75.17319°W

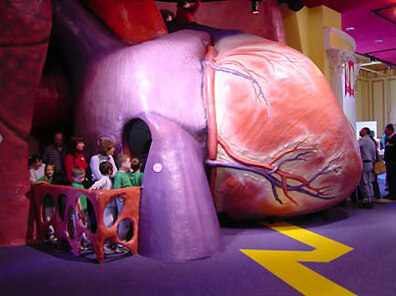
The Giant Heart exhibit

The Giant Heart exhibit, originally called the "Engine of Life" exhibit, is one of the most popular and notable exhibits at the Franklin Institute. Built in 1953, the exhibit is roughly two stories tall and 35-feet in diameter. A walk-through exhibit, visitors can explore the different areas of the heart.

Visiting The Giant Heart has become a tradition or rite of passage for many school-aged children, particularly on field trips, in the Philadelphia-area.

== History ==
The original idea for the walk-through heart exhibit came from Dr. Mildred Pfeiffer, a physician and Director of Cardiovascular Diseases at the Pennsylvania Department of Health who would travel giving lectures about the heart and heart health; she proposed the idea of the heart in an effort to have a centralized resource that people could visit and learn of the heart. The original materials used to construct the heart were papier-mâché, chicken wire and lumber.

The Giant Heart was supposed to have only been on display for six months. It was the idea of physician Mildred Pfeiffer, who designed The Giant Heart with a medical illustrator and engineer. It was originally made out of wood, chicken wire and papier-mâché. However, The Giant Heart became a popular attraction and the Franklin Institute opted to keep it. More than 70 years later, it remains one of the most visited exhibits at The Franklin Institute.

== Features ==
The Giant Heart is 100 times larger than the average human heart. As visitors walk-through The Giant Heart there is signage pointing out which part of the "heart" they are walking past.

The deeper visitors walk deeper into the heart, the sound of a heartbeat gets louder and louder. The sound of the heartbeat was originally computer generated, but as part of the 2019 renovations, it was replaced by the sound of a real human heartbeat.

Stephanie Farr writing in The Philadelphia Inquirer said that The Giant Heart has a "universally recognized-but-hard-to-define odor."

Located next to The Giant Heart is the Bio-science exhibit, which aims to teaching and sparking interest among visitors in the science of the human body.

== Renovation ==
In 1979, The Giant Heart was rebuilt with fiberglass. The Giant Heart was remodeled and updated in 2004 and 2019.
