= International Electrical Exhibition of 1884 =

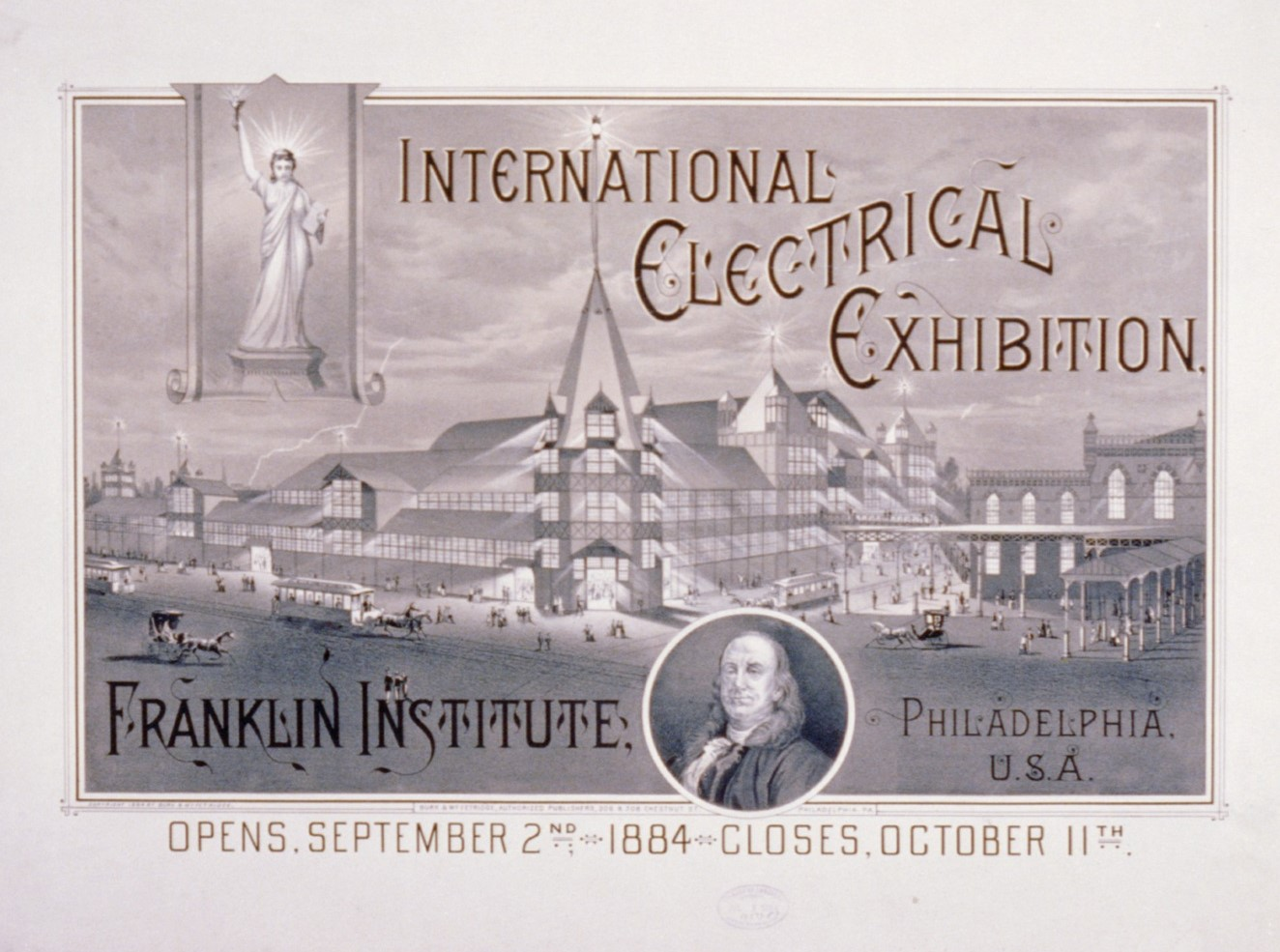
1884 exhibition poster showing the Franklin Institute

Throughout the 19th century, Philadelphia's Franklin Institute was often the organizer of American-held international exhibitions that showcased the achievements of industrial civilization. For example, it played a key role in organizing and hosting the International Electrical Exhibition of 1884 in Philadelphia. This, the first great electrical exposition in the United States, was held from September 2 to October 11, 1884.

== Franklin and Morse ==
The show featured the displays of 196 commercial exhibitors and 1,500 exhibits, including a historical exhibit that featured devices used by Benjamin Franklin and the first Morse telegraph instrument. The novel application of electricity to the running of a railroad train, printing presses, sewing machines was demonstrated, as was an electrical searchlight, which had never been seen before.

== Edison ==
Many of Thomas Edison's companies had display booths at the exhibition. The Edison Electric Light Company showed in operation their system of house lighting as supplied from a central station. The Edison Company for Isolated Lighting exhibited their system of lighting factories, hotels, hospitals, and other places situated beyond the reach of a central lighting station. A full assortment of Edison light bulbs (including experimental ones demonstrating the Edison effect) and dynamos also made up parts of other exhibits, as well as a quarter-length bust of Edison made of bronzed plaster by Rupert Schmid.

== Landmarks ==
More than 285,000 people attended the International Electrical Exhibition of 1884, which was held in a large building built for this purpose at 32nd Street and Lancaster Avenue. The landmark exposition resulted in the formation of the American Institute of Electrical Engineers, an ancestor of today's Institute of Electrical and Electronics Engineers.

During the International Electrical Exhibition, the National Conference of Electricians was convened on September 8–13, 1884, at the Franklin Institute. This was the first national convention of electricians in the nation. The summit was authorized and organized by the United States Electrical Commission, which President Chester A. Arthur had formed earlier that year under an act of Congress. It was funded to the amount of $7,500 by the federal government.
