= Samuel Vaughan Merrick =

American businessman

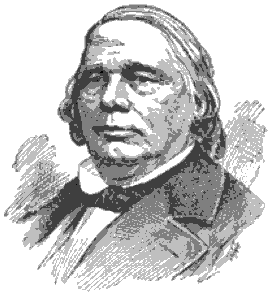
- Born: May 4, 1801; Hallowell, Massachusetts, U.S.
- Died: August 18, 1870 (aged 69); Philadelphia, Pennsylvania, U.S.
- Resting place: Laurel Hill Cemetery, Philadelphia, Pennsylvania, U.S.
- Occupation: Businessman
- Spouse: Sarah Thomas (m. 1823)
- Children: 1

Samuel Vaughan Merrick (1801–1870) was a 19th-century American manufacturer, and the first president of the Pennsylvania Railroad.

== Biography ==
Coat of Arms of Samuel Vaughan Merrick

Born near Hallowell, Massachusetts (it became part of Maine in 1820) on May 4, 1801, Merrick left school in 1816 and moved to Philadelphia, where he worked for his merchant uncle John Vaughan. He subsequently studied engineering, and in 1824 founded, with scientist William Keating, The Franklin Institute of the State of Pennsylvania for the Promotion of the Mechanic Arts, of which he was President from 1832 until 1854. He also established the firm of Merrick and Agnew, which manufactured fire engines.

He married Sarah Thomas on December 25, 1823 and they had one son.

In 1836, Merrick established the Southwark Iron Foundry, which became one of the most advanced manufacturing plants of its kind in this country. Operated by the firm of Merrick & Towne (later renamed Merrick & Sons), the foundry built the engines for the USS Mississippi.

Merrick took a deep interest in public affairs and was instrumental to the introduction of illuminating gas into Philadelphia, being the chairman of a Committee of the Common Council that reported on the benefits of gaslighting. He also served as the first president of the Pennsylvania Railroad, which he had advocated as a means to connect Philadelphia to the west, and was also president of the Sunbury and Erie Railroad (later part of the PRR) and the Catawissa Railroad (later part of the Reading Railroad). Merrick was a member of the American Philosophical Society from 1833 until his death.

Merrick maintained a residence in Haddon Township, New Jersey. He died in Philadelphia on August 18, 1870, and was interred at Laurel Hill Cemetery.

== Footnotes ==
Preceded by	President of the Pennsylvania Railroad; 1847–1849	Succeeded by William C. Patterson
