= Thermionic emission =

Thermally induced flow of charge carriers from a surface

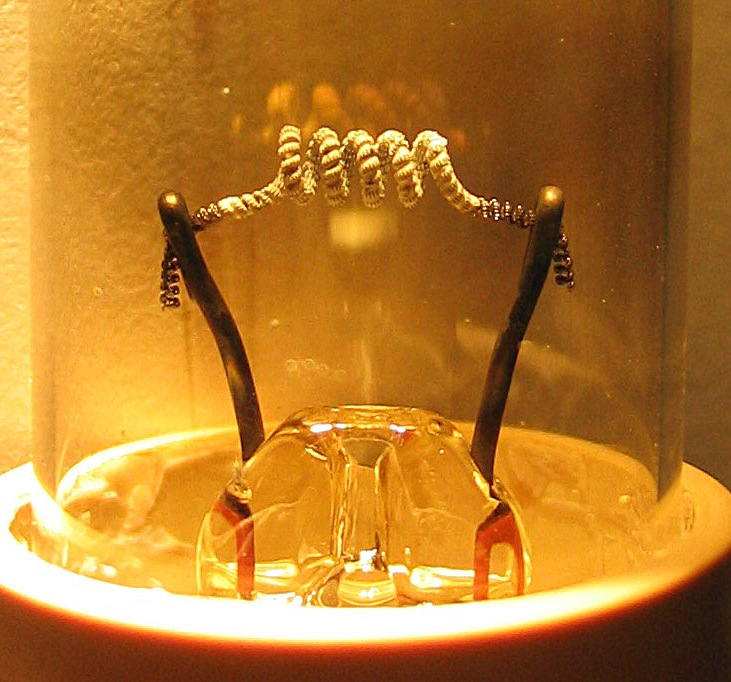
Closeup of the filament in a low pressure mercury gas-discharge lamp showing white thermionic emission mix coating on the central portion of the coil. Typically made of a mixture of barium, strontium and calcium oxides, the coating is sputtered away through normal use, eventually resulting in lamp failure.

Thermionic emission is the liberation of charged particles from a hot electrode whose thermal energy gives some particles enough kinetic energy to escape the material's surface. The particles, sometimes called thermions in early literature, are now known to be ions or electrons. Thermal electron emission is specifically the emission of electrons and occurs when thermal energy overcomes the material's work function.

After emission, an opposite charge of magnitude equal to that of the emitted charge is initially left behind in the emitting region. But if the emitter is connected to a battery, that remaining charge is neutralized by charge supplied by the battery as particles are emitted, so the emitter will have the same charge it had before emission. This facilitates additional emission to sustain an electric current. Thomas Edison noticed this current in 1880 while inventing his light bulb, and subsequent scientists referred to the current as the Edison effect, though it wasn't until after the 1897 discovery of the electron that scientists understood that electrons were emitted and why.

Thermionic emission is crucial to the operation of a variety of electronic devices and can be used for electricity generation (such as thermionic converters and electrodynamic tethers) or cooling. Thermionic vacuum tubes emit electrons from a hot cathode into an enclosed vacuum and may steer those emitted electrons with applied voltage. The hot cathode can be a metal filament, a coated metal filament, or a separate structure of metal or carbides or borides of transition metals. Vacuum emission from metals tends to become significant only for temperatures over 1,000 K (730 °C; 1,340 °F). Charge flow increases dramatically with temperature.

The term thermionic emission is now also used to refer to any thermally-excited charge emission process, even when the charge is emitted from one solid-state region into another.

== History ==
Because the electron was not identified as a separate physical particle until the work of J. J. Thomson in 1897, the word electron was not used when discussing experiments that took place before this date.

The phenomenon was initially reported in 1853 by Edmond Becquerel. It was observed again in 1873 by Frederick Guthrie in Britain. While doing work on charged objects, Guthrie discovered that a red-hot iron sphere with a negative charge would lose its charge (by somehow discharging it into air). He also found that this did not happen if the sphere had a positive charge. Other early contributors included Johann Wilhelm Hittorf (1869–1883), Eugen Goldstein (1885), and Julius Elster and Hans Friedrich Geitel (1882–1889).

=== Edison effect ===
Thermionic emission was observed again by Thomas Edison in 1880 while his team was trying to discover the reason for breakage of carbonized bamboo filaments and undesired blackening of the interior surface of the bulbs in his incandescent lamps. This blackening was carbon deposited from the filament and was darkest near the positive end of the filament loop, which apparently cast a light shadow on the glass, as if negatively-charged carbon emanated from the negative end and was attracted towards and sometimes absorbed by the positive end of the filament loop. This projected carbon was deemed "electrical carrying" and initially ascribed to an effect in Crookes tubes where negatively-charged cathode rays from ionized gas move from a negative to a positive electrode. To try to redirect the charged carbon particles to a separate electrode instead of the glass, Edison did a series of experiments (a first inconclusive one is in his notebook on 13 February 1880) such as the following successful one:

Experiment demonstrating the Edison effect

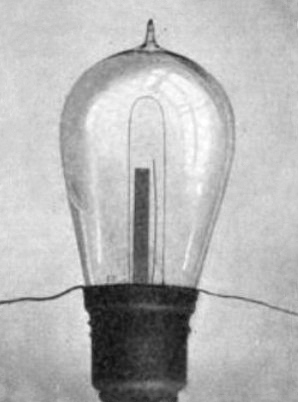
One Edison effect bulb consisted of an evacuated bulb with an externally-wired electrode such as a metal plate in this example (variants used platinum foil or extra wire instead) isolated from the carbon filament (hairpin-shaped in this example).

Edison's circuit configured his bulb (large circle) such that its electrode was in series with an ammeter (A) to measure conventional current and a voltage source (separate from the power source heating the filament) to bias the electrode either positively (in which case electrons were attracted and flowed along the arrows from the filament through the partial vacuum to the electrode) or negatively (which resulted in no measurable current). We now know that in addition to carbon molecules, the filament was emitting electrons, which have negative charge and thus are attracted to a positively-charged electrode but not a negatively-charged electrode.

This effect had many applications. Edison found that the current emitted by the hot filament increased rapidly with voltage, and filed a patent for a voltage-regulating device using the effect on 15 November 1883, notably the first US patent for an electronic device. He found that sufficient current would pass through the device to operate a telegraph sounder, which was exhibited at the International Electrical Exhibition of 1884 in Philadelphia. Visiting British scientist William Preece received several bulbs from Edison to investigate. Preece's 1885 paper on them referred to the one-way current through the partial vacuum as the Edison effect, although that term is occasionally used to refer to thermionic emission itself. British physicist John Ambrose Fleming, working for the British Wireless Telegraphy Company, discovered that the Edison effect could be used to detect radio waves. Fleming went on to develop a two-element thermionic vacuum tube diode called the Fleming valve (patented 16 November 1904). Thermionic diodes can also be configured to convert a heat difference to electric power directly without moving parts as a device called a thermionic converter, a type of heat engine.

== Richardson's law ==
Following J. J. Thomson's identification of the electron in 1897, the British physicist Owen Willans Richardson began work on the topic that he later called "thermionic emission". He received a Nobel Prize in Physics in 1928 "for his work on the thermionic phenomenon and especially for the discovery of the law named after him".

From band theory, there are one or two electrons per atom in a solid that are free to move from atom to atom. This is sometimes collectively referred to as a "sea of electrons". Their velocities follow a statistical distribution, rather than being uniform, and occasionally an electron will have enough velocity to exit the metal without being pulled back in. The minimum amount of energy needed for an electron to leave a surface is called the work function. The work function is characteristic of the material and for most metals is on the order of several electronvolts (eV). Thermionic currents can be increased by decreasing the work function. This often-desired goal can be achieved by applying various oxide coatings to the wire.

In 1901 Richardson published the results of his experiments: the current from a heated wire seemed to depend exponentially on the temperature of the wire with a mathematical form similar to the modified Arrhenius equation, $T^{1/2} \mathrm{e}^{-b/T}$. Later, he proposed that the emission law should have the mathematical form

$$J = A_{\mathrm{G}} T^2 \mathrm{e}^{-W \over k T}$$

where J is the emission current density, T is the temperature of the metal, W is the work function of the metal, k is the Boltzmann constant, and A_{G} is a parameter discussed next.

In the period 1911 to 1930, as physical understanding of the behaviour of electrons in metals increased, various theoretical expressions (based on different physical assumptions) were put forward for A_{G}, by Richardson, Saul Dushman, Ralph H. Fowler, Arnold Sommerfeld and Lothar Wolfgang Nordheim. Over 60 years later, there is still no consensus among interested theoreticians as to the exact expression of A_{G}, but there is agreement that A_{G} must be written in the form:

$$A_{\mathrm{G}} = \; \lambda_{\mathrm{R}} A_0$$

where λ_{R} is a material-specific correction factor that is typically of order 0.5, and A_{0} is a universal constant given by

$$A_0 = {4 \pi m k^2 q_\text{e} \over h^3} = 1.20173 \times 10^6\,\mathrm{A{\cdot}m^{-2}{\cdot}K^{-2}}$$

where $m$ and $-q_\text{e}$ are the mass and charge of an electron, respectively, and $h$ is the Planck constant.

In fact, by about 1930 there was agreement that, due to the wave-like nature of electrons, some proportion r_{av} of the outgoing electrons would be reflected as they reached the emitter surface, so the emission current density would be reduced, and λ_{R} would have the value 1 − r_{av}. Thus, one sometimes sees the thermionic emission equation written in the form:

$$J = (1-r_{\mathrm{av}})\lambda_\text{B} A_0 T^2 \mathrm{e}^{-W \over k T}$$.

However, a modern theoretical treatment by Modinos assumes that the band-structure of the emitting material must also be taken into account. This would introduce a second correction factor λ_{B} into λ_{R}, giving $A_{\mathrm{G}} = \lambda_{\mathrm{B}} (1-r_{\mathrm{av}}) A_0$. Experimental values for the "generalized" coefficient A_{G} are generally of the order of magnitude of A_{0}, but do differ significantly as between different emitting materials, and can differ as between different crystallographic faces of the same material. At least qualitatively, these experimental differences can be explained as due to differences in the value of λ_{R}.

Considerable confusion exists in the literature of this area because: (1) many sources do not distinguish between A_{G} and A_{0}, but just use the symbol A (and sometimes the name "Richardson constant") indiscriminately; (2) equations with and without the correction factor here denoted by λ_{R} are both given the same name; and (3) a variety of names exist for these equations, including "Richardson equation", "Dushman's equation", "Richardson–Dushman equation" and "Richardson–Laue–Dushman equation". In the literature, the elementary equation is sometimes given in circumstances where the generalized equation would be more appropriate, and this in itself can cause confusion. To avoid misunderstandings, the meaning of any "A-like" symbol should always be explicitly defined in terms of the more fundamental quantities involved.

Because of the exponential function, the current increases rapidly with temperature when kT is less than W. (For essentially every material, melting occurs well before kT = W.)

The thermionic emission law has been recently revised for 2D materials in various models.

== Schottky emission ==
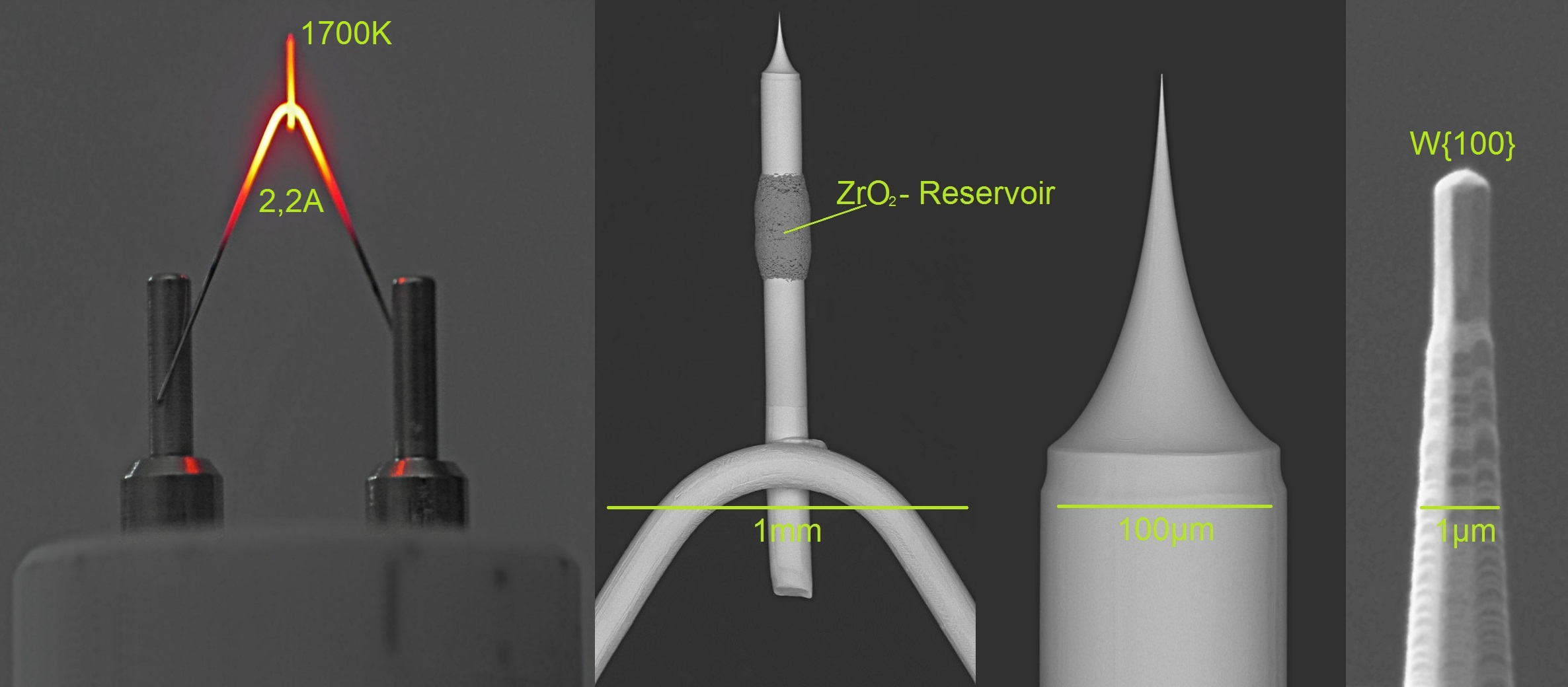
Schottky-emitter electron source of an electron microscope

In electron emission devices, especially electron guns, the thermionic electron emitter will be biased negative relative to its surroundings. This creates an electric field of magnitude E at the emitter surface. Without the field, the surface barrier seen by an escaping Fermi-level electron has height W equal to the local work-function. The electric field lowers the surface barrier by an amount ΔW, and increases the emission current. This is known as the Schottky effect (named for Walter H. Schottky) or field enhanced thermionic emission. It can be modeled by a simple modification of the Richardson equation, by replacing W by (W − ΔW). This gives the equation

$$J (E,T,W) = A_{\mathrm{G}} T^2 e^{ - (W - \Delta W) \over k T}$$
$$\Delta W = \sqrt{{q_\text{e}}^3 E \over 4\pi \epsilon_0},$$

where ε_{0} is the electric constant (also called the vacuum permittivity).

Electron emission that takes place in the field-and-temperature-regime where this modified equation applies is often called Schottky emission. This equation is relatively accurate for electric field strengths lower than about 10^{8} V⋅m^{−1}. For electric field strengths higher than 10^{8} V⋅m^{−1}, so-called Fowler–Nordheim (FN) tunneling begins to contribute significant emission current. In this regime, the combined effects of field-enhanced thermionic and field emission can be modeled by the Murphy-Good equation for thermo-field (T-F) emission. At even higher fields, FN tunneling becomes the dominant electron emission mechanism, and the emitter operates in the so-called "cold field electron emission (CFE)" regime.

Thermionic emission can also be enhanced by interaction with other forms of excitation such as light. For example, excited Cesium (Cs) vapors in thermionic converters form clusters of Cs-Rydberg matter which yield a decrease of collector emitting work function from 1.5 eV to 1.0–0.7 eV. Due to long-lived nature of Rydberg matter this low work function remains low which essentially increases the low-temperature converter's efficiency.

== Photon-enhanced thermionic emission ==
Photon-enhanced thermionic emission (PETE) is a process developed by scientists at Stanford University that harnesses both the light and heat of the sun to generate electricity and increases the efficiency of solar power production by more than twice the current levels. The device developed for the process reaches peak efficiency above 200 °C, while most silicon solar cells become inert after reaching 100 °C. Such devices work best in parabolic dish collectors, which reach temperatures up to 800 °C. Although the team used a gallium nitride semiconductor in its proof-of-concept device, it claims that the use of gallium arsenide can increase the device's efficiency to 55–60 percent, nearly triple that of existing systems, and 12–17 percent more than existing 43 percent multi-junction solar cells.

== See also ==
- Space charge
- Thermal ionization
- Nottingham effect
