= Julius Elster =

German teacher and physicist

Julius Johann Phillipp Ludwig Elster (24 December 1854 in Blankenburg – 6 April 1920) was a teacher and physicist.

== Biography ==
Elster and Hans Friedrich Geitel, the son of a Forstmeister who had moved to Blankenburg with his family in 1861, grew up in the same neighborhood and attended school and high school together. The personal friendship was deepened by the shared interest in the natural sciences during their years at university in Heidelberg and Berlin. After they received their teaching certification in Brunswick, they went their separate ways for a short time. In 1881 they were working together at the Herzogliche Große Schule (translation: Ducal Great School) in Wolfenbüttel and used their leisure for experimental research. There Karl Bergwitz (1875–1958) was among their students.

Elster was awarded an honorary doctorate (1915) along with Geitel at the Braunschweig University of Technology. In 1919, he was diagnosed with diabetes mellitus. In April 1920, the Privy Councilor Julius Elster died in Bad Harzburg during a spa stay.

== Publications ==
Together with his friend Hans Geitel, he has well over 100 publications on atmospheric electricity, the intensity of the starlight, ihe problems of ionizing radiation (example: "On the radioactivity of the earth substrate and its possible relationship to the geothermal") and other important areas of research a valuable contribution paid to the development of physics. Together with Geitel, Julius Elster invented a modern photoelectric cell.
