= Franklin Institute =

Science museum in Philadelphia, Pennsylvania

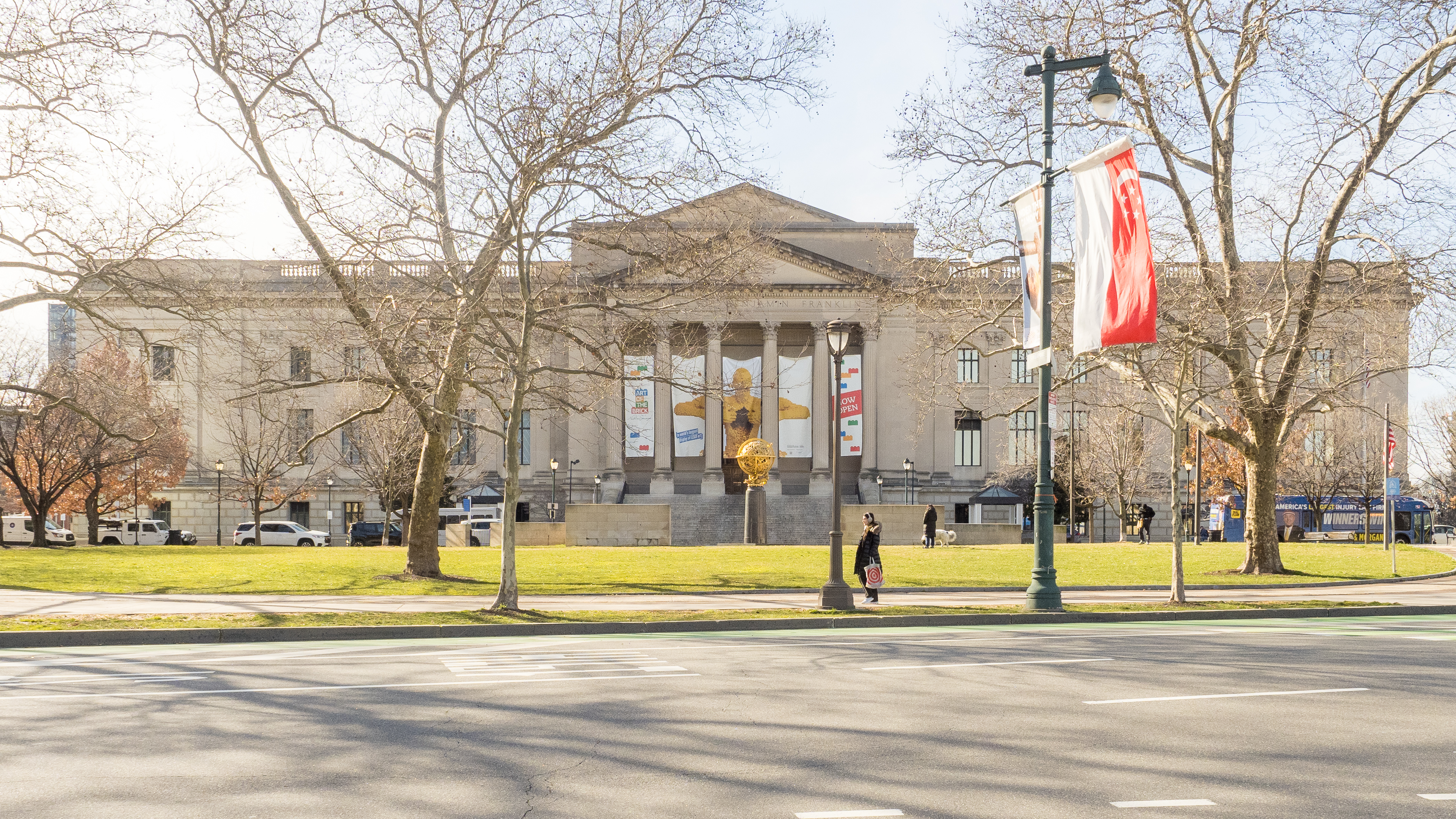
- The Franklin Institute in March 2024
- Established: 1824; 202 years ago
- Location: 222 North 20th Street, Philadelphia, Pennsylvania, U.S.
- Type: Science museum
- President: Larry Dubinski
- Public transit access: SEPTA bus: 7, 32, 33, 38, 48, 49; Philly Phlash, Suburban Station
- Website: fi.edu/en
- www.fi.edu
- The Franklin Institute Science Museum
- U.S. National Register of Historic Places
- Area: 4.4 acres (1.8 ha)
- Built: 1931
- Architects: Windrim, John Torrey; Day & Zimmermann
- Architectural style: Classical Revival
- NRHP reference No.: 85000039
- Added to NRHP: January 3, 1985

The Franklin Institute is a science museum and a center of science education and research in Philadelphia, Pennsylvania. It is named after the American scientist and statesman Benjamin Franklin. It houses the Benjamin Franklin National Memorial. Founded in 1824, the Franklin Institute is one of the oldest centers of science education and development in the United States. Its chief astronomer is Derrick Pitts.

== History ==
=== 19th century ===
On February 5, 1824, Samuel Vaughan Merrick and William H. Keating founded the Franklin Institute of the State of Pennsylvania for the Promotion of the Mechanic Arts. The opening was chronicled by The Literary Chronicle for the Year 1824:

With a view further to develop the resources of the union, increase the national independence, call forth the ingenuity and industry of the people, and thereby increase the comforts of the community at large.

Begun in 1825, the institute was an important force in the professionalization of American science and technology through the nineteenth century, beginning with early investigations into steam engines and water power. In addition to conducting scientific inquiry, it fostered research and education by running schools, publishing the influential Journal of The Franklin Institute, sponsoring exhibitions, and recognizing scientific advancement and invention with medals and awards.

=== 20th century ===
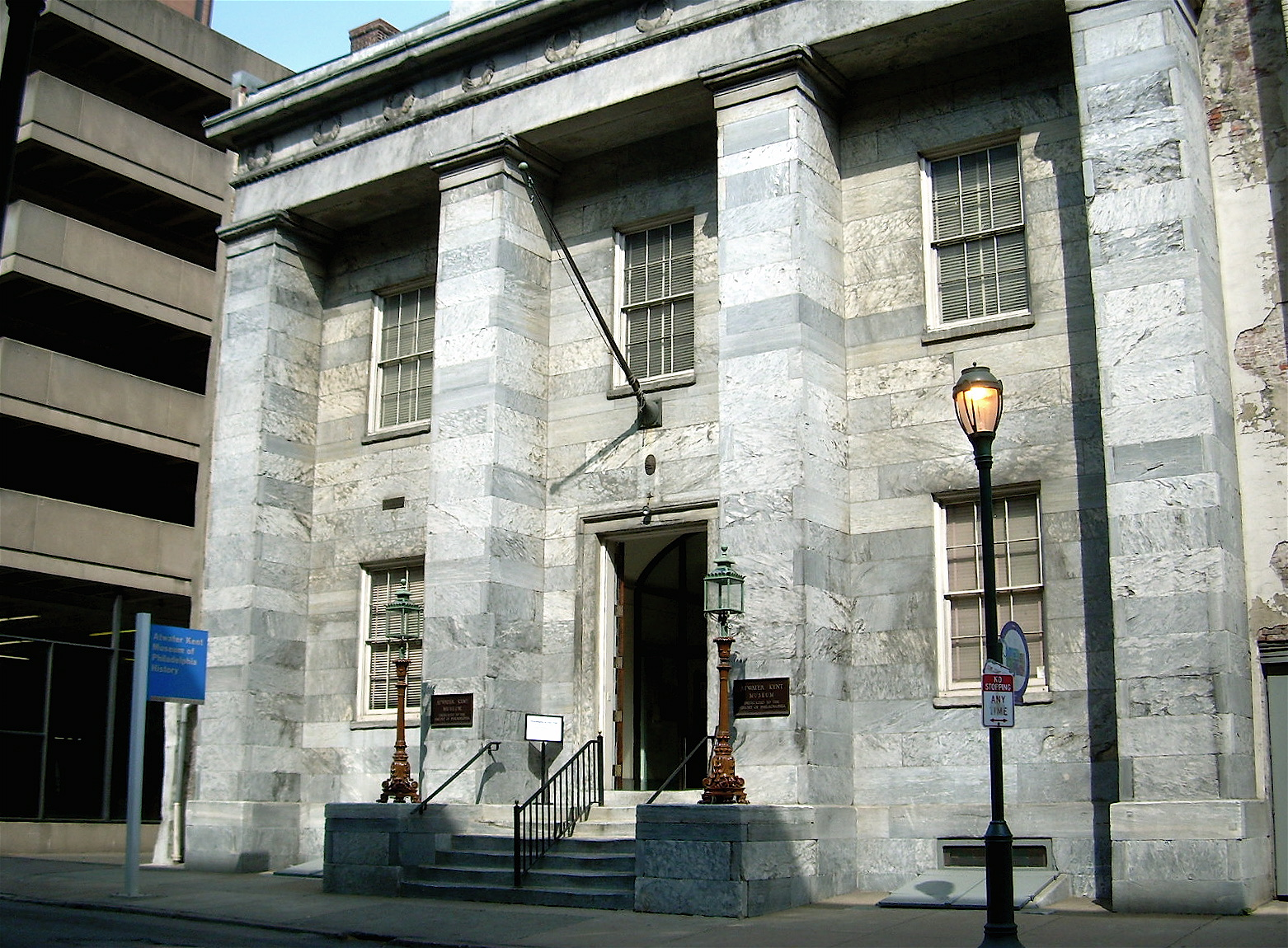
The Franklin Institute's original building at 15 South 7th Street

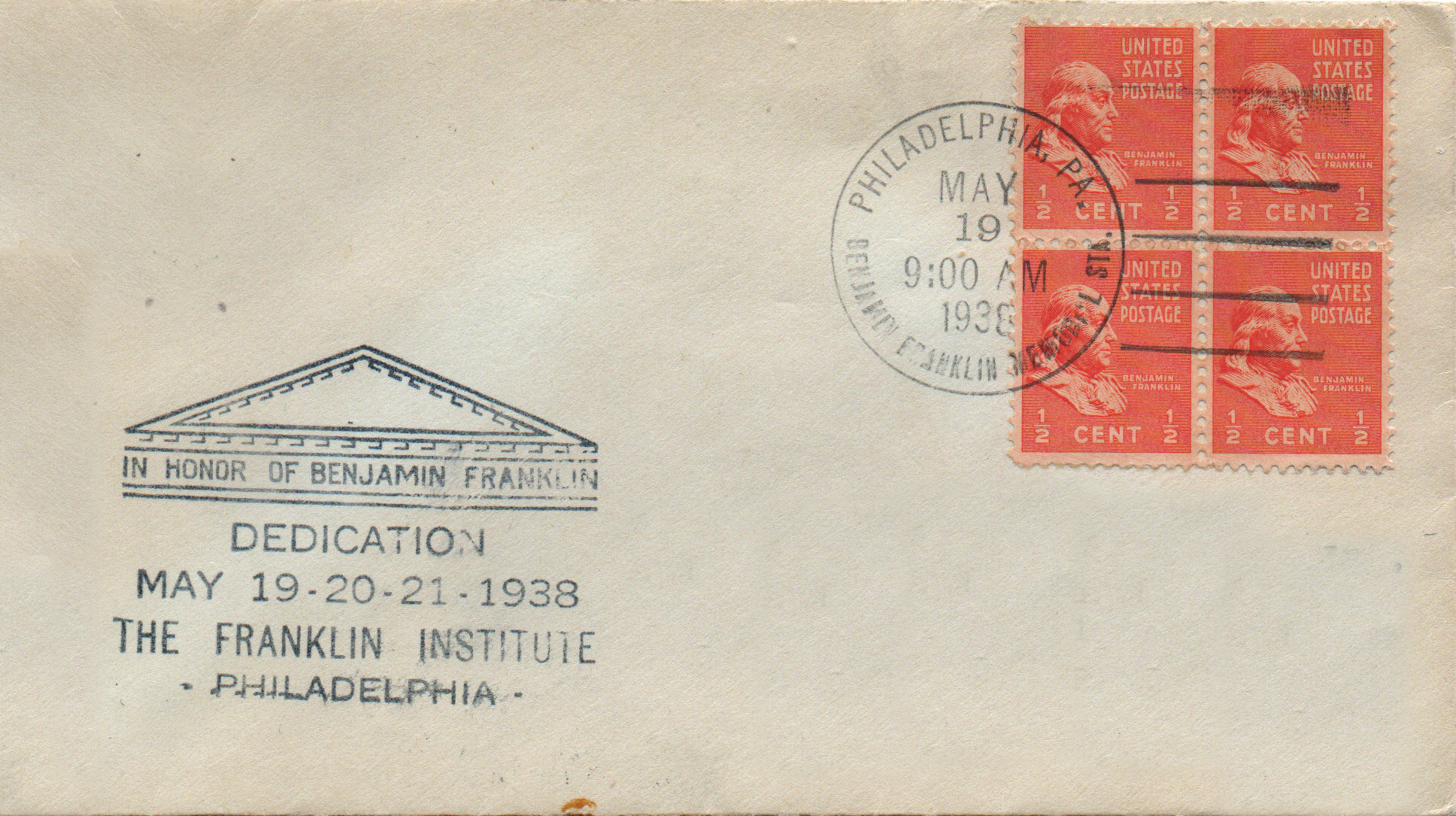
The Franklin 1/2¢ stamp issued at the Franklin Institute on May 19, 1938

In the late 20th century, the institute's research roles gave way to educating the general public through its museum. The Bartol Research Foundation of the Franklin Institute, founded in 1924 to conduct research in the physical sciences, now is part of the University of Delaware and named Bartol Research Institute. The Franklin Institute Laboratories for Research and Development operated from the Second World War into the 1980s.

Many scientists have demonstrated groundbreaking new technology at the Franklin Institute. From September 2 to October 11, 1884, it hosted the International Electrical Exhibition of 1884, the first great electrical exposition in the United States. The world's first public demonstration of an all-electronic television system was later given by Philo Taylor Farnsworth on August 25, 1934.

The first female member, Elizabeth Skinner, was elected to membership in 1833. The Franklin Institute was integrated in 1870, when Philadelphia teacher and activist Octavius Catto was admitted as a member.

The institute's original building at 15 South 7th Street, later the home of the (now-defunct) Atwater Kent Museum, eventually proved too small for the institute's research, educational programs, and library. The Institute moved into its current home on the Benjamin Franklin Parkway, near the intersection with 20th Street, in 1934. The new facility was intended from the start to educate visitors through hands-on interactions with exhibits: "Visitors to this museum would be encouraged to touch, handle, and operate the exhibits in order to learn how things work." Funds to build the new Institute and Franklin Memorial came from the Poor Richard Club, The Board of City Trusts, the Benjamin Franklin Memorial, Inc., and the Franklin Institute. John T. Windrim's original design was a completely square building surrounding the Benjamin Franklin Statue, which had yet to be built. Despite the effects of the Great Depression, the Benjamin Franklin Memorial, Inc. raised $5 million (equal to $96,364,542 today) between December 1929 and June 1930. Only two of the four wings envisioned by Windrim were built; these face the Parkway and share design elements with other cultural and civic structures around Logan Circle.

On March 31, 1940, press agent William Castellini issued a press release stating that the world would end the next day. The story was picked up by KYW, which reported, "Your worst fears that the world will end are confirmed by astronomers of Franklin Institute, Philadelphia. Scientists predict that the world will end at 3 p.m. Eastern Standard Time tomorrow. This is no April Fool joke. Confirmation can be obtained from Wagner Schlesinger, director of the Fels Planetarium of this city." This caused a panic in the city which only subsided when the Franklin Institute assured people it had made no such prediction. Castellini was dismissed shortly thereafter.

=== 21st century ===
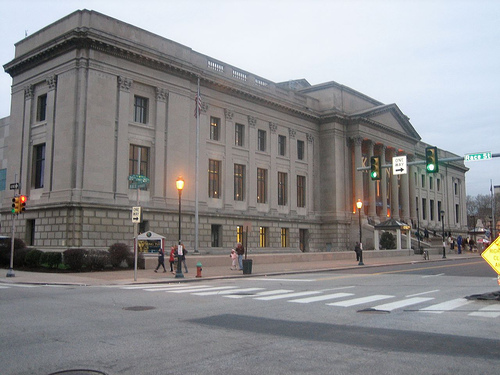
The façade of the Franklin Institute in April 2007

On December 21, 2017, during a party hosted by the museum, a partygoer with his companions slipped into a closed-off exhibit of ten Terracotta Army warriors on loan from China. After his companions left, the partygoer broke off and stole a thumb from one of the warriors. Law enforcement agents later recovered the stolen thumb. The vandalized cavalryman is valued at US$4.5 million, and is considered a "priceless part of China's cultural heritage". The vandalism stoked outrage in Chinese media, such as Xinhua. The Franklin Institute blamed its external security contractor, and stated it had reviewed its security measures and procedures to prevent such situations from recurring. The defendant was charged both with theft, and with concealment of an item of cultural heritage.

The defense argued that the defendant was being "overcharged" under statutes applicable to professional art thieves. An April 2019 trial ended in a hung jury with seven of the 12 jurors in favor of acquittal. A February 2020 retrial was postponed due to travel restrictions related to the COVID-19 pandemic. In 2023, the partygoer was sentenced to 5 years probation.

In 2021, the institute housed the work of Dyymond Whipper-Young as she broke the Guinness world record for the "world's largest drawing by an individual".

=== Succession of presidents ===
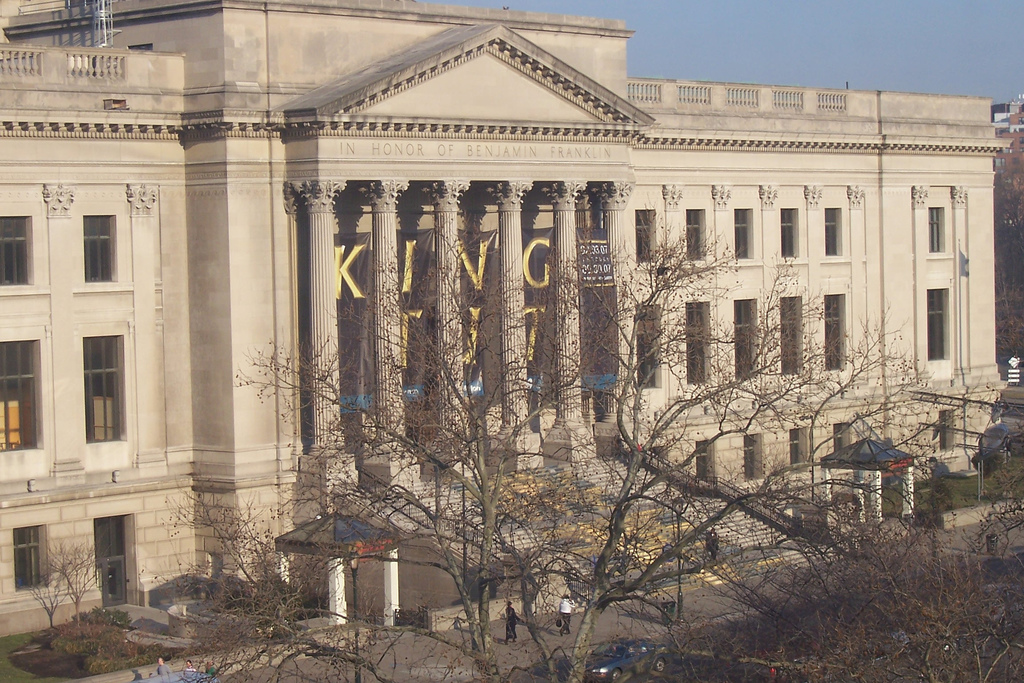
The front steps of the Franklin Institute during its King Tut exhibit in 2007 as seen from Moore College of Art and Design

- James Ronaldson (1824–1841)
- Samuel V. Merrick (1842–1854)
- John C. Cresson (1855–1863)
- William Sellers (1864–1866)
- John Vaughan Merrick (1867–1869)
- Coleman Sellers (1870–1874)
- Robert Empie Rogers (1875–1878)
- William Penn Tatham (1880–1885)
- Joseph Miller Wilson (1887–1896)
- Dr. Walton Clark (1907–1923)
- Dr. Nathan Hayward (1929–1935)
- Dr. W. Laurence LePage (1958–1967)
- Dr. Athelstan F. Spilhaus (1967–1969)
- Dr. Bowen C. Dees (1970–1981)
- Dr. Joel N. Bloom (1969–1990)
- Dr. James L. Powell (1991–1994)
- Dr. Dennis M. Wint (1995–2014)
- Larry Dubinski (2014–present)

=== Chair of the Board of Trustees ===
- Donald Morel (2014–present)

=== Board of Trustees Emeriti Members ===
- William J. Avery
- Marsha R. Perelman
- James A. Unruh

=== Capital campaign ===
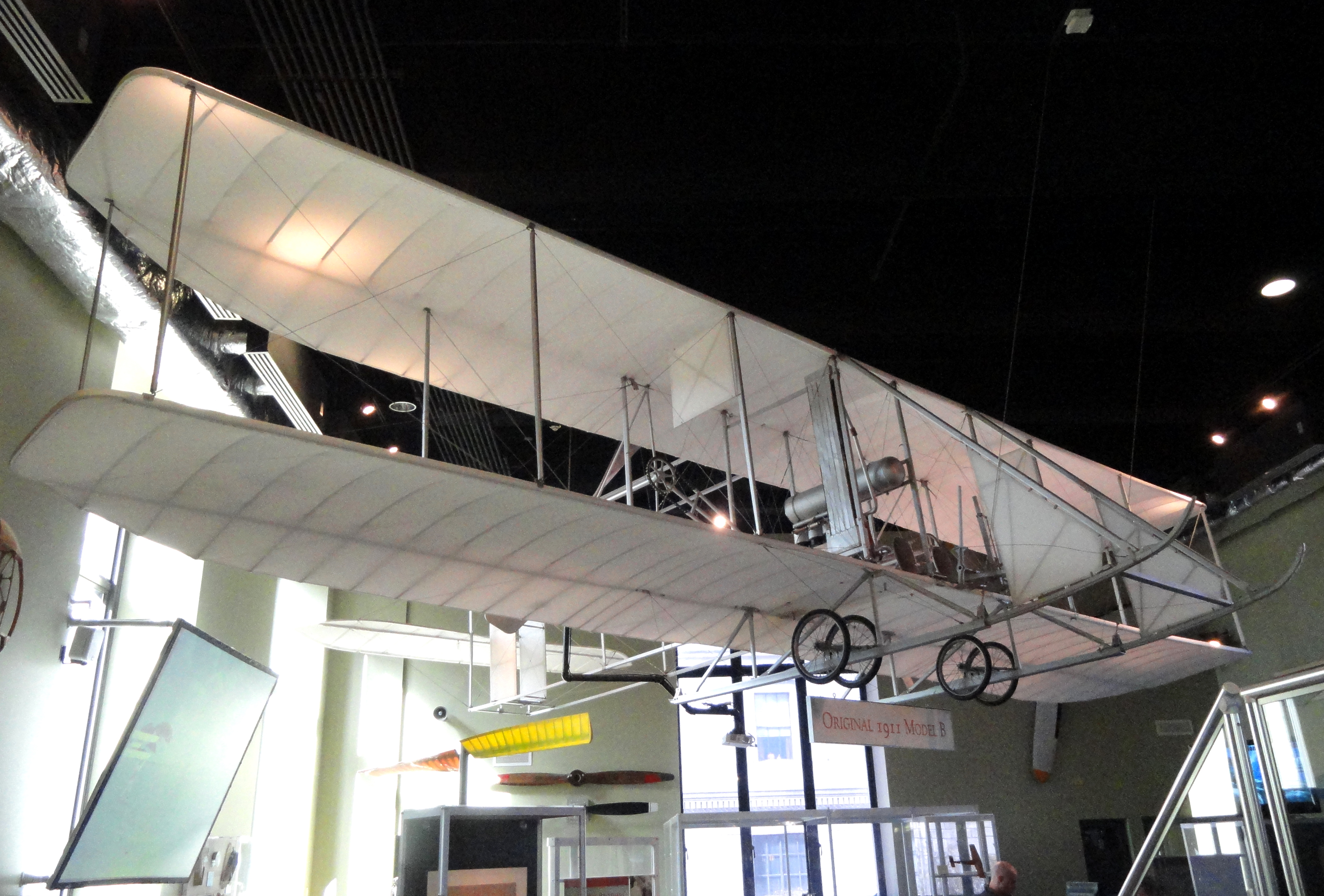
Grover Bergdoll's 1911 Wright Brothers Model B flyer

In 2006, the Franklin Institute began fundraising activities for the Inspire Science! capital campaign, a $64.7 million campaign intended to fund the construction of a 53,000 sq ft (4,900 m^{2}) building addition, new exhibits, and upgrades and renovations to the existing Institute building and exhibits.

In 2011, the Franklin Institute received a $10 million gift from Athena and Nicholas Karabots towards the Inspire Science! capital campaign. This gift is the largest gift in the institute's history, and put the Franklin Institute within $6 million of the $64.7 million capital campaign goal. The Nicholas and Athena Karabots Pavilion will house not only a $10 million multiroom exhibit on neuroscience, but also a conference center, classroom space, and additional room for traveling exhibitions.

== The Science Center ==
The most recognizable part of the Franklin Institute's Science Center is the Franklin Institute Science Museum. In the spirit of inquiry and discovery embodied by Benjamin Franklin, the mission of the Franklin Institute Science Museum serves to inspire an understanding of and passion for science and technology learning. Among other exhibits, the Science Museum holds the largest collection of artifacts from the Wright brothers' workshop.

=== Permanent exhibits ===
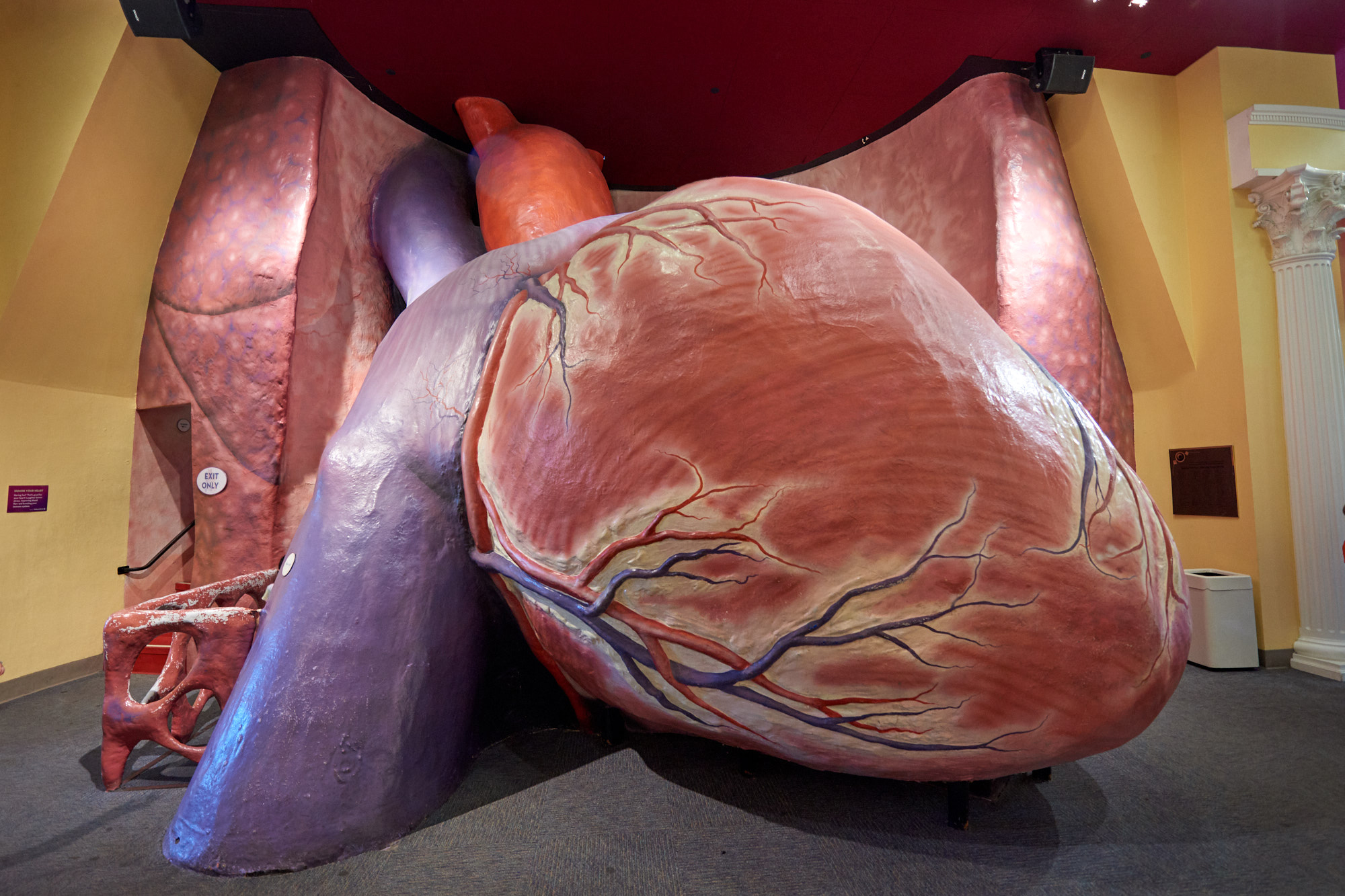
The Giant Heart as of 2019

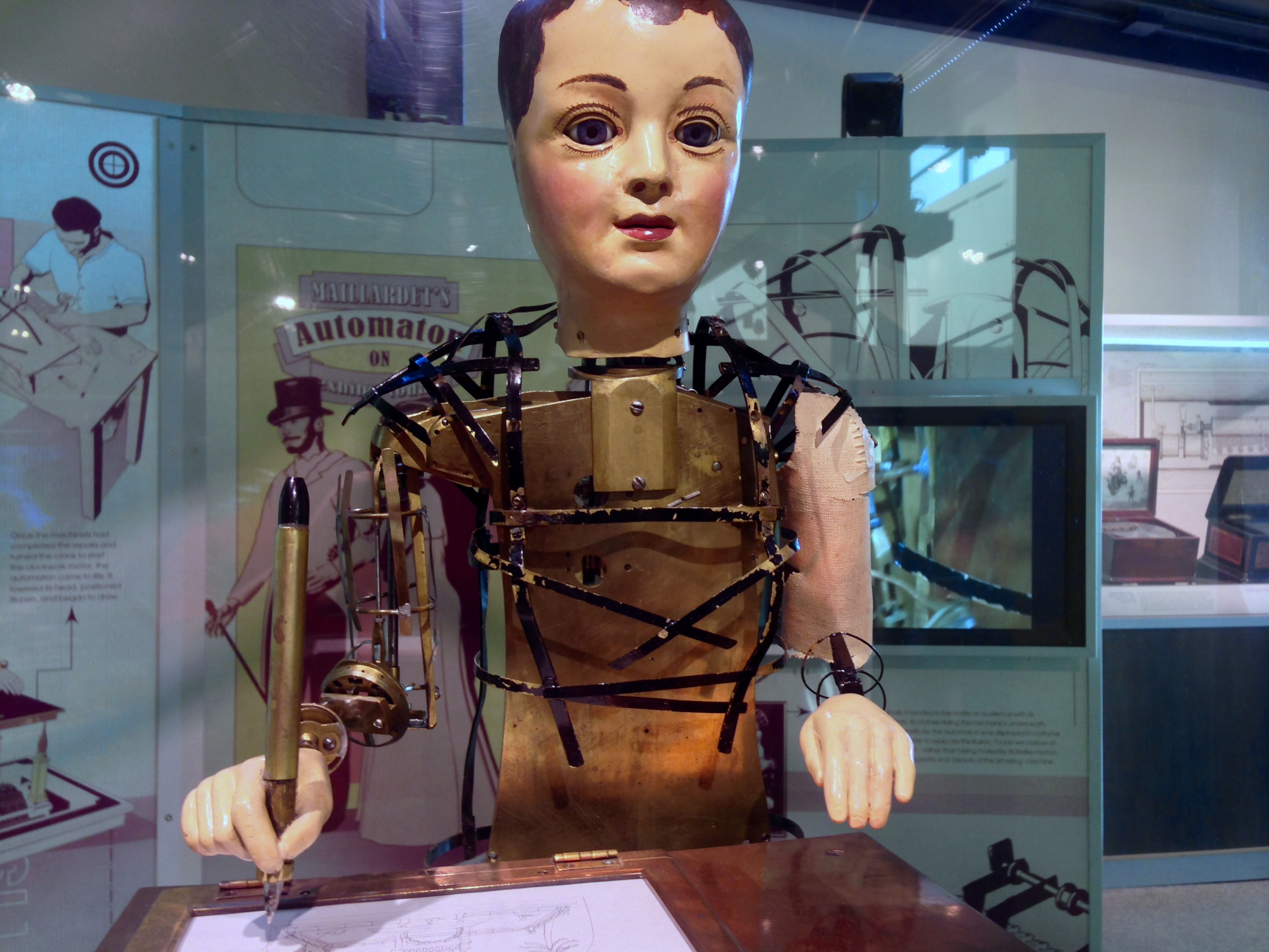
Maillardet's automaton in the Amazing Machine

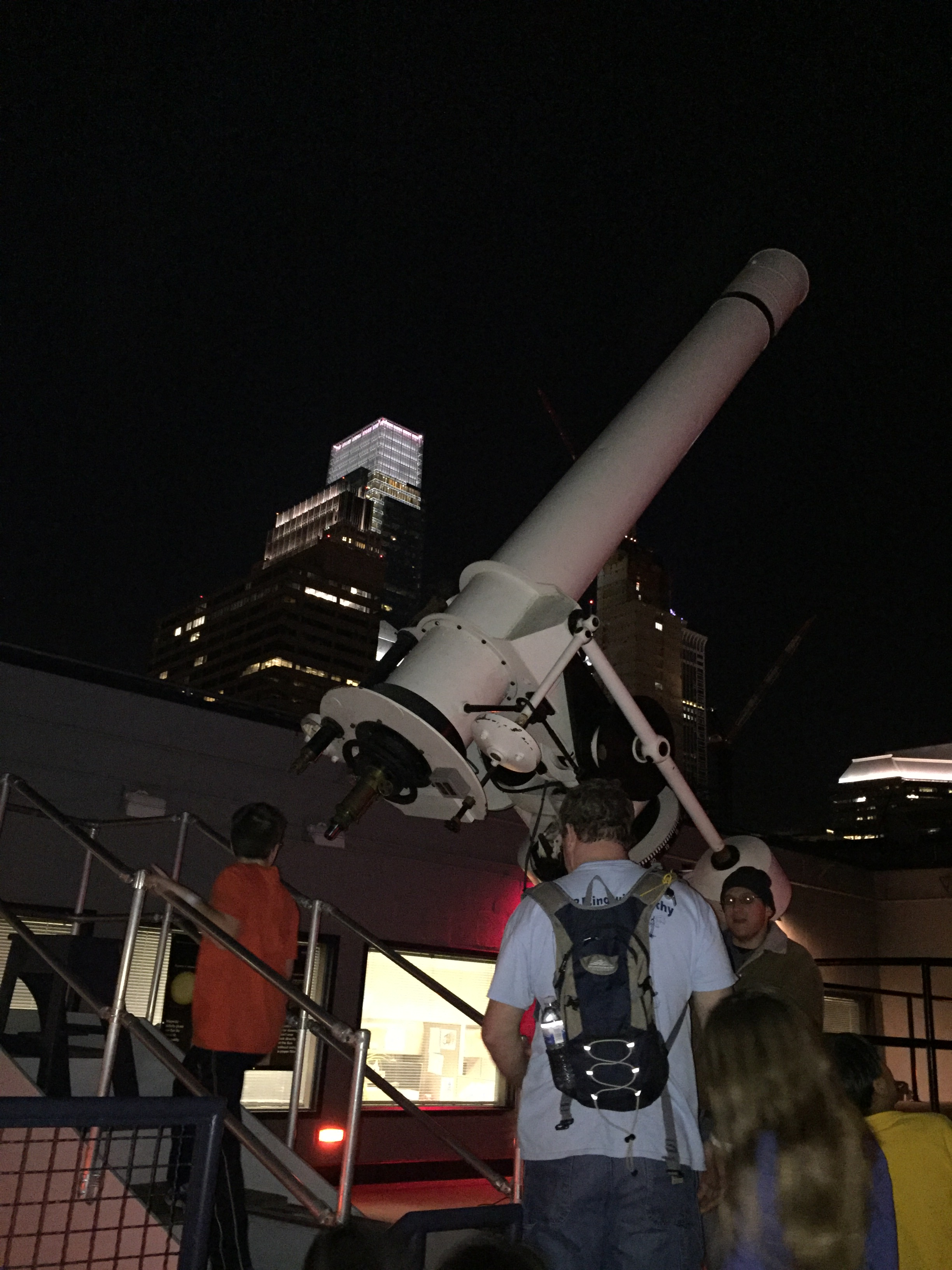
The Joel N. Bloom Observatory at night

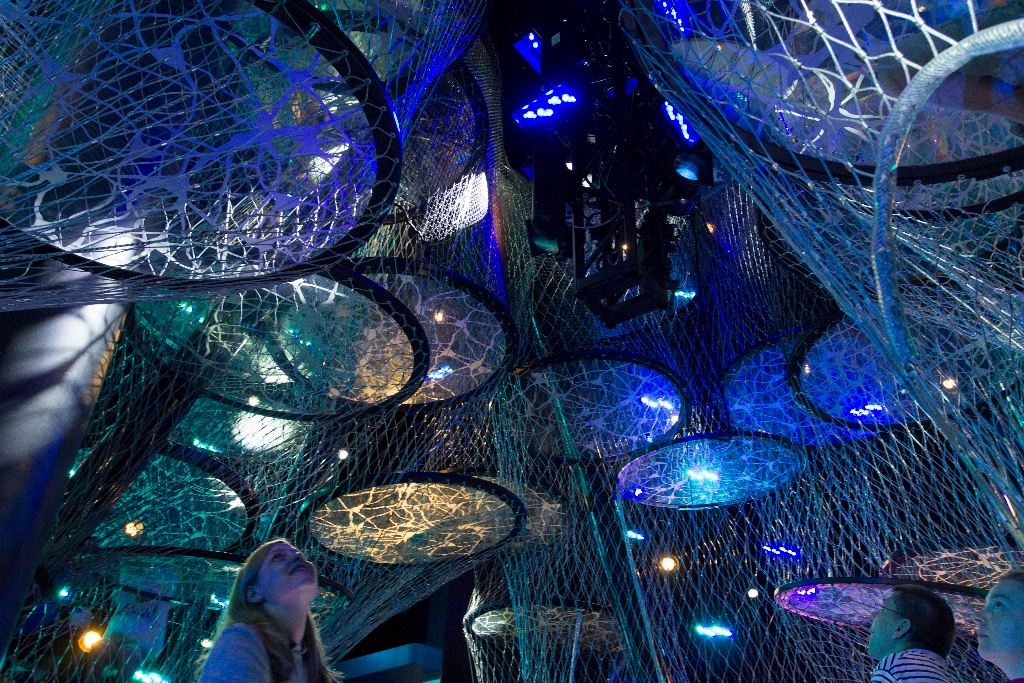
The Neural Climber at the Franklin Institute

- Electricity, which replaced Franklin...He's Electric in 2010, showcases Franklin's discovery of electricity and its use in the modern world, including elements such as a sustainable dance floor, and an array of LEDs that turn on in the presence of cell phone signals and other low-power electrical signals. (Electricity and Technology)
- Changing Earth, which opened to the public, along with Electricity, on March 27, 2010, focuses on the powerful forces of air, water, and land and their effect upon the earth, as well as how humans respond to and interact with these forces.
- The Franklin Airshow features The Wright Brothers Aeronautical Engineering Collection, their newly restored Wright Model B airplane, and a United States Air Force 1948 T-33 Shooting Star jet trainer. (Aviation and Technology)
- The Giant Heart has been a Philadelphia icon since its opening in 1954. (Biology, Chemistry and Anatomy)
- Joel N. Bloom Observatory, remodeled in 2006, features five telescopes, including a very large 10-inch (250 mm) Zeiss Refractor and four 8-inch (200 mm) Meade Reflectors.
- SportsZone is an interactive exhibit that shows the science behind sports. (Physics and Technology)
- The Train Factory has a real, once movable train: The Baldwin 60000 steam locomotive, which was rolled into the museum while the building's walls were still being constructed. The 60000's track is itself the top level of a full-size exhibit on bridge engineering in the museum basement and long closed to the public. Along with 60000, the Institute has two other steam locomotives, both from the early 19th century. This exhibit is currently closed for an extensive renovation and is expected to reopen in the fall of 2024. (History, Engineering, and Technology)
- Sir Isaac's Loft allows visitors to blend art and science into their own masterpiece. (Physics and Art)
- Space Command features real space suits and allows visitors to track their houses, in real time, via satellite. (Astronomy, Technology, and Mathematics)
- The Franklin Institute installed Foxtrot Papa, a former British Airways Boeing 707 airliner, as a permanent exhibit in the mid-1970s. Standing above an outdoor Science Park and connected to the second-floor aviation hall by skybridges, this aircraft could easily be seen from the outside of the building and was a remarkable sight in the middle of a major city. In the 1980s, however, the aircraft was sold for scrap, much to the dismay of local aviation enthusiasts.
- Amazing Machine allows visitors to experience a machine-like environment featuring little-seen pieces from the Franklin Institute's priceless collection, including Maillardet's automaton.
- Your Brain explores the physiology and neurology of our most remarkable organ. The exhibit includes an 18-foot-tall Luckey Climber climbing structure that simulates neural pathways sending messages, and an area to discuss questions of neuroscience ethics, in addition to 70 interactive learning experiences.

=== Other attractions ===
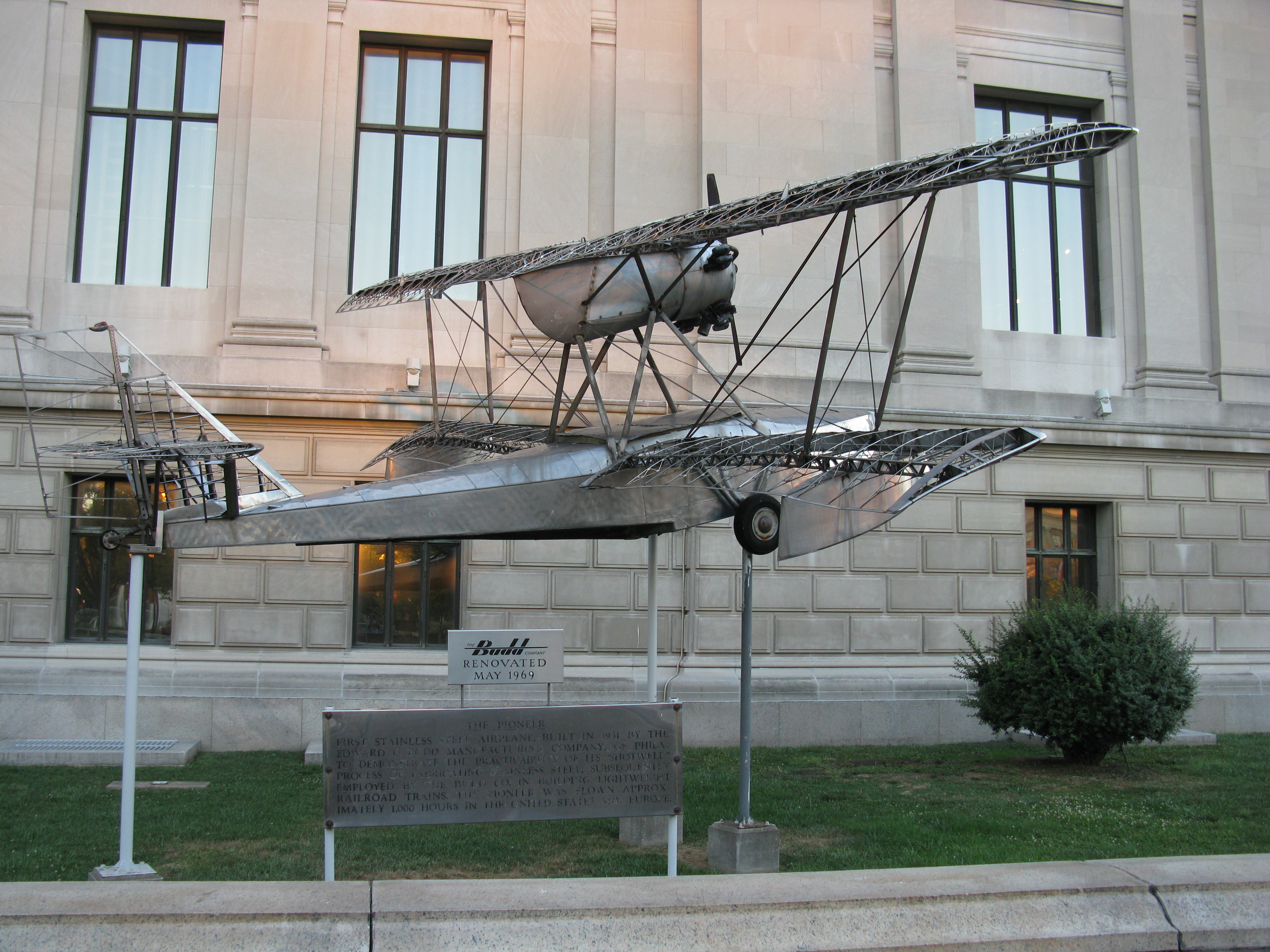
Budd BB-1 Pioneer in front of the museum

The Science Center includes many pertinent attractions that are not museum exhibits. The Budd BB-1 Pioneer flying boat, in front of the museum, was the world's first stainless steel airplane, built by Philadelphia-based Edward F. Budd Manufacturing Corporation, and has been on display since 1935.

A mock-up which would eventually become the Lunar Module in the Apollo space program, first shown on display in the 1966–67 World's Fair, held in the New York Hall of Science, is also located on the grounds. (See photo.)

=== Theaters ===
In 1933, Samuel Simeon Fels contributed funds to build The Fels Planetarium, only the second built in the United States after Chicago's Adler Planetarium. Fully reconstructed in 2002, the Planetarium's new design includes replacement of the original 40,000-pound stainless steel dome, originally built in 1933. The new premium dome is lighter and is 60 feet (18 m) in diameter. It is the first of its kind in the United States. The planetarium is also outfitted for visitors who are hearing impaired.

The Tuttleman IMAX Theater was an IMAX dome theater that was 180° encompassing and tilted at 30 degrees. The seating placed the audience up in a dome over 70 ft (21 m) across and 4.5 stories tall. The theater had 20,000 watts of amplifier power and over 50 speakers. It was closed in 2020 due to COVID-19, and did not reopen with the rest of the museum. In 2023, the Franklin Institute confirmed that the theater would remain closed permanently, citing that it was financially unviable and had outdated equipment, and that the museum would be investing in other new exhibits instead.

Early in 2008, extensive renovation of the museum's auditorium was completed. Previously a lecture hall, the space was renamed Franklin Theater, and features 3D and hi-def Blu-ray digital projection capabilities. The Franklin Theater shows educational films during daytime hours while also including mass release feature-length films.

=== Traveling exhibits ===
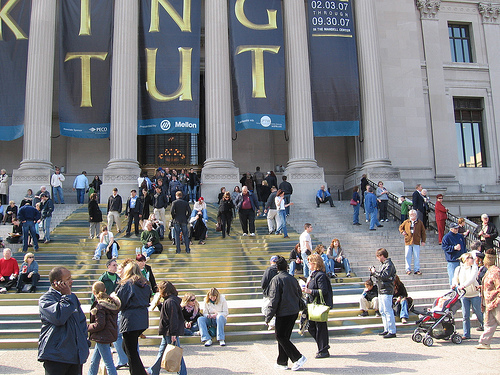
During the King Tut exhibit, the front steps were decorated with an image of King Tut's face.

In the past, the Science Center has hosted many traveling exhibits including Storms, Titanic, Grossology, Body Worlds, Body Worlds: Animal Inside Out, Darwin, and Robots. In the summer of 2007, the Franklin Institute hosted Tutankhamun and The Golden Age of The Pharaohs, in the Mandell Center of the Franklin Institute Science Museum. The exhibit began its United States Tour in Los Angeles, and went to Fort Lauderdale, and Chicago, before coming to Philadelphia for its final American appearance. When the exhibit left Philadelphia on September 30, 2007, it traveled to London.

This exhibit was nearly twice the size of the original Tutankhamun exhibit of the 1970s, and contained 50 objects directly from Tut's tomb, as well as nearly 70 object from the tombs of his ancestors in The Valley of the Kings. The show also featured a CAT Scan that revealed what the Boy King may have looked like.

The Franklin Institute is a member of the Association of Science and Technology Centers (ASTC) and the American Alliance of Museums (AAM).

The Franklin Institute is also a member of the Science Museum Exhibit Collaborative with the Fort Worth Museum of Science & History; the Museum of Science, Boston; COSI Columbus, formerly known as the Center of Science and Industry in Columbus, Ohio; OMSI in Portland, Oregon; the Science Museum of Minnesota in Saint Paul, Minnesota; and the California Science Center, formerly the California Museum of Science & Industry, in Los Angeles.

In July 2025, Comcast NBCUniversal and Universal Destinations & Experiences announced that an interactive experience would open at The Franklin Institute from February 14 to September 7, 2026. The exhibition spans 18,000 square feet and feature eight themed galleries, 25 interactive experiences, and over 100 original artefacts.

=== Benjamin Franklin National Memorial ===
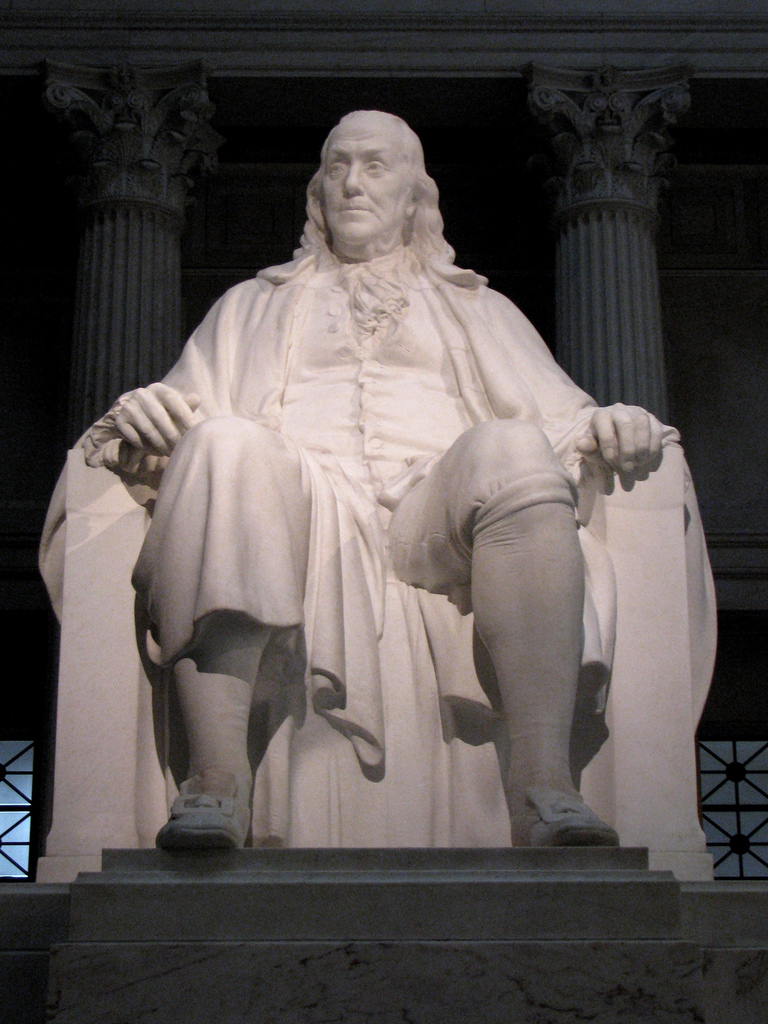
James Earle Fraser's statue of Benjamin Franklin

The Benjamin Franklin National Memorial features a 20-foot (6.1 m) high marble statue, sculpted by James Earle Fraser. Originally opened in 1938, the Memorial was designed by architect John T. Windrim and modeled after the Pantheon in Rome. The Hall is 82 ft (25 m) in length, width, and height. The domed ceiling is self-supporting and weighs 1600 tons. The floors, walls, columns, pilasters, and cornices are made of marbles imported from Portugal, Italy, and France. The United States Congress designated the Hall and statue as the official Benjamin Franklin National Memorial on October 25, 1972 (Pub. L. 92–551). The Memorial was dedicated by Vice President Nelson Rockefeller in 1976.

On December 30, 2005, Congress authorized the institute to receive up to $10 million in matching grants for the rehabilitation of the memorial and for the development of related exhibits.

In the fall of 2008, the Benjamin Franklin National Memorial was re-opened after a summer-long restoration that included multimedia enhancements. Philadelphia's most famous citizen is featured in Benjamin Franklin Forever, an hourly 3.5-minute multimedia presentation utilizing the entire rotunda.

Also noteworthy is the Franklin Institute's Frankliniana Collection, some of which is on rotating display in the Pendulum Staircase. Highlights include Franklin's 1777 Nini Medallion, the scale model of the bust from the statue in the Memorial, the figurehead of Franklin's bust from the frigate USS Franklin, his ceremonial sword used in the court of King Louis XVI, and the odometer that Franklin used to measure the postal routes in Philadelphia. Additionally, the institute's Electricity exhibition highlights one of Franklin's lightning rods, his electricity tube, a Franklin Electrostatic Generator, the 1751 publication of Franklin's Experiments and Observations on Electricity, and Thornton Oakley's two 1940 historical murals of Franklin and the "Kite and Key" experiment.

=== The Journal of The Franklin Institute ===
In 1826, The Journal of The Franklin Institute was established to publish US Patent information and to document scientific and technological achievements throughout the nation. It is the second oldest continuously published scientific journal in the country, and is now primarily devoted to engineering and applied mathematics.

=== Awards ===
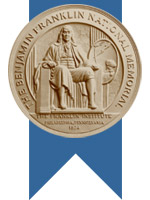
Benjamin Franklin Medal

Since 1824, the Franklin Institute has maintained the longest continuously awarded science and technology awards program in the United States, and one of the oldest in the world. The first issue of the Journal of The Franklin Institute, dated January 1826, makes the first written reference to these awards. Before 1998 several medals were awarded by the Franklin Institute, such as (year indicates when the award was first presented): the Elliott Cresson Medal (1875), the Edward Longstreth Medal (1890), the Howard N. Potts Medal (1911), the Franklin Medal (1915), the George R. Henderson Medal (1924), the Louis E. Levy Medal (1924), the John Price Wetherill Medal (1926), The Frank P. Brown Medal (first awarded in 1941), Stuart Ballantine Medal (1947), and the Albert A. Michelson Medal (1968). Past winners include Henry Ford, Frank Lloyd Wright, Marie Curie, and Thomas Edison.

In 1998 all of the endowed medals were reorganized as the Benjamin Franklin Medals. Multiple medals are given every year, for different fields of science and engineering. The fields awarded today are "Chemistry", "Computer and Cognitive Science", "Earth and Environmental Science", "Electrical Engineering", "Life Science", "Mechanical Engineering" and "Physics". In the past also the fields "Earth Science", "Engineering" and "Materials Science" were rewarded.

Additionally since 1990, the Bower Award and Prize for Achievement in Science (Bower Science Award) and the Bower Award for Business Leadership have been awarded annually. They are funded by a $7.5 million bequest in 1988 from Henry Bower, a chemical manufacturer in Philadelphia. The Bower Science Award contains $250,000 of cash, one of the largest amounts for a science award in the US.

In 2021, the Benjamin Franklin NextGen Award was added to the list of Franklin Institute Awards.

The institute's Committee on Science and the Arts determines the winners of these awards. Recipients and related information can be found in the laureates database.

Recent Franklin Institute Awards
Award	2012	2013	2016
Benjamin Franklin Medal in Chemistry	see Bower Science Award	Jerrold Meinwald	Nadrian C. Seeman
Benjamin Franklin Medal in Computer and Cognitive Science	Vladimir Vapnik	William Labov	Yale Patt
Benjamin Franklin Medal in Earth and Environmental Science	Lonnie Thompson and Ellen Stone Mosley-Thompson	Robert A. Berner	Brian F. Atwater
Benjamin Franklin Medal in Electrical Engineering	Jerry Nelson	see Bower Science Award	Solomon W. Golomb
Benjamin Franklin Medal in Life Science	Sean B. Carroll	Rudolf Jaenisch	Robert S. Langer
Benjamin Franklin Medal in Mechanical Engineering	Zvi Hashin	Subra Suresh	Shu Chien
Benjamin Franklin Medal in Physics	Rashid Sunyaev	Alexander Dalgarno	N/A
Bower Award and Prize for Achievement in Science	Louis E. Brus (Chemistry)	Kenichi Iga	William J. Borucki
Bower Award for Business Leadership	John Chambers	Michael S. Dell	Patrick Soon-Shiong

== Informal science learning research ==
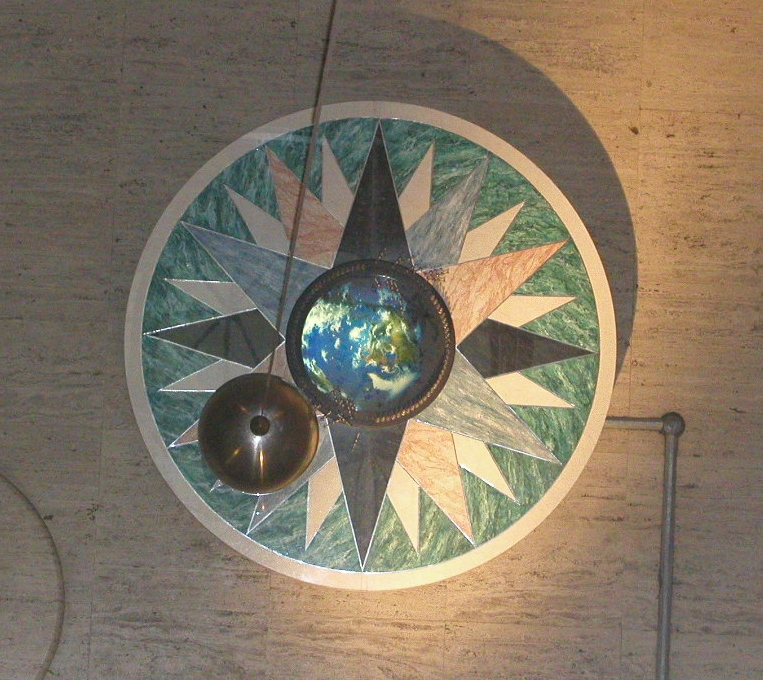
The Foucault pendulum staircase, a centerpiece of the museum

The Franklin Institute also undertakes research in informal science education. Areas of special strength are educational technology, school partnerships, and youth leadership. In addition, the center has built a substantial portfolio of unique online resources of the history of science, including online exhibits on Ben Franklin and the Heart, as well as resources on the Wright Aeronautical Engineering Collection. The Franklin Institute is a member of the Nanoscale Informal Science Education Network (NISE Net).

== Programs ==
=== Science Leadership Academy ===
Opening in September 2006, The Science Leadership Academy is a partnership between the Franklin Institute and the School District of Philadelphia.

=== Teacher professional development ===
The Franklin Institute offers summer institutes and school year mini-courses for K-8 teachers, in collaboration with the School District of Philadelphia and Curriculum & Instruction Office.

=== Partnerships for Achieving Careers in Technology and Science ===
Partnerships for Achieving Careers in Technology and Science, or PACTS, is a year-round program of science enrichment, career development, and leadership opportunities for diverse middle- and high-school students in the Philadelphia Region. PACTS students use hands-on science workshops, field based research, field trips, and laboratory experiments to learn how science affects their everyday lives.

=== Girls at the Center ===
Girls at the Center is a partnership between the Franklin Institute and the Girl Scouts of the USA provided girls and their families a chance to learn about science together. Over 100 sites participated in the program, with over 70 of the sites still active today. Girls at the Center provided activities for the girls to do with their families at home, as well as projects to be completed on site, all culminating in a year-end party.

== See also ==
- Academy of Natural Sciences
- Children's museum
- John Scott Award issued by the City of Philadelphia
- List of science museums
- Logan Square
- National Treasure, 2004 film
- Wagner Free Institute of Science
