= Cavallo's multiplier =

Device that generates electrostatic charge

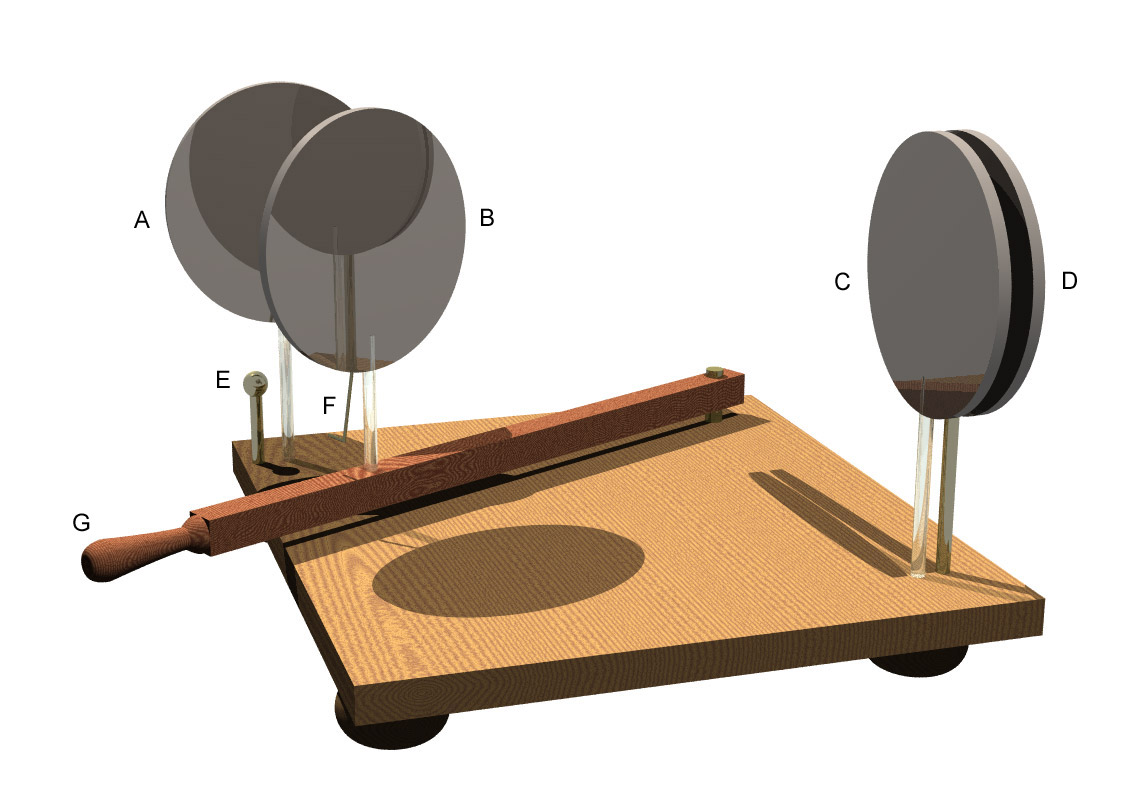
Cavallo's multiplier, from an 1890 illustration. From left to right, the metal disks are the insulated charge receiver A, the insulated charge transferrer B, the insulated charge accumulator C, and the earthed disk D. An earthing pin E makes contact with a wire F connected to B.

Cavallo's multiplier was an early electrostatic influence machine, invented in 1795 by the Anglo-Italian natural philosopher Tiberius Cavallo. Its purpose was to multiply, or amplify, a small electric charge to a level where it was detectable by the insensitive electroscopes of the day. Repeated operation of the device could produce voltages high enough to generate sparks.

== Description ==
Cavallo described his machine in his 1795 Treatise on Electricity. He had examined Bennet's charge doubler of 1787 and found it wanting in several regards, notably in its inconsistent operation and tendency to retain the charge from an earlier experiment. Cavallo resolved to build a better device. His machine consisted of four metal plates supported on a wooden board by posts, of which three were insulating and one conducting.

The charge to be multiplied was applied to the first of these (plate A), which stood on an insulating post. A moveable insulated metal plate (B) was brought close to A (though not permitted to touch it), and then grounded. The charge on A caused charge separation on B due to electrostatic induction. Plate B was then moved away, breaking its earth connection. Since B was insulated, it acquired and retained a small charge opposite in sign to the charge on A. Plate B was transferred by means of an insulating rod to be brought into electrical contact with the third metal plate C which was insulated. Since both B and C were conducting, B would transfer a portion of its charge to C. To maximise the transferred charge, C was placed in close proximity to a final metal plate D, which was earthed.

The experimenter would move Plate B repeatedly back and forth, placing it near to A and earthed at one end of its motion, and then into contact with C at the other. With each cycle, charge was drawn from the Earth and added to C. After a suitable number of cycles, the grounded plate D would be removed, and the electrostatic potential on C would rise to approximately the potential of A multiplied by the number of operations.

Cavallo termed his device a multiplier, though 'addition' was perhaps a more accurate description of its operation, as the charge on C was accumulated by successive additions.

== Wilson's machine ==
Wilson's machine, described by its inventor in Nicholson's Journal in August 1804, was a development on this concept which simultaneously operated two Cavallo's multipliers by means of a pair of reciprocating levers. One side would accumulate the charge of the other, and since the two accumulating plates were connected together by means of a wire, Wilson's machine was a true multiplier, rather than an addition machine. The charge would thus accumulate more rapidly than Cavallo's multiplier and the machine could generate high voltages in a short period of time. It moreover was self-exciting, needing no initial charge to operate, as the small initial charge acquired from contact electrification was enough to start the accumulation process.
