= James Wimshurst =

English inventor, engineer and shipwright

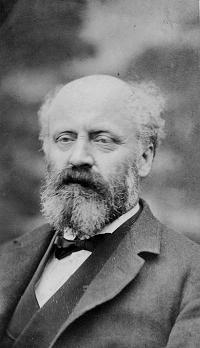
- Born: 13 April 1832; Poplar, Middlesex, England
- Died: 3 January 1903 (aged 70); Clapham, London, England
- Parent: Henry Wimshurst (father)
- Engineering career
- Discipline: Shipwright, electrical engineer
- Significant design: Wimshurst machine
- Awards: Fellow of the Royal Society

James Wimshurst (13 April 1832 – 3 January 1903) was an English inventor, engineer and shipwright. Though Wimshurst did not patent his machines and the various improvements that he made to them, his refinements to the electrostatic generator led to its becoming widely known as the Wimshurst machine.

== Biography ==
Wimshurst was born in 1832, in Poplar, East London, England. He was the son of Henry Wimshurst, a shipbuilder of Ratcliffe Cross Dock. Wimshurst was educated at Steabonheath House in London and became an apprentice at the Thames Ironworks until 1853 with James Mare. In 1865, he married Clara Tribble. In 1865, after Wimshurst was transferred to Liverpool, he worked at the Liverpool Underwriters' Registry. In 1874, he joined the Board of Trade as a "chief shipwright surveyor" at Lloyds. Later, in 1890, he became the Board of Trade's representative at an international conference in Washington.

Wimshurst dedicated large amounts of his free time to experimental works. Besides his electrical activities, he invented a distinctive vacuum pump, a device to indicate ship stability and methods for electrically connecting lighthouses to the mainland. In 1878, he began to experiment with electrical influence machines for generating electrical sparks for scientific and entertainment purposes. Beginning in 1880, he became interested in electrostatic machines of the influence type. His house in Clapham, England, had a versatile workshop which had a wide variety of tools and devices for electric illumination. Wimshurst constructed several of the known types of electrostatic generators, such as those created by W. Nicholson, F. P. Carré and W. T. B. Holtz. To these predecessors, Wimshurst made many modifications with the result known as the Holtz-Wimshurst machine.

Shortly afterwards, Wimshurst developed a "duplex machine". The device had two disks turning in opposite directions, with metallic conducting sectors on the surfaces of each. Compared to its predecessors, this machine was less sensitive to atmospheric conditions and did not require an electric power supply. This form of the machine was also improved by other developers (such as the Pidgeon machine developed by W. R. Pidgeon, which increased the electrical induction effect and its electrical output). In 1882, Wimshurst developed his "Cylindrical Machine". By 1883, his improvements to the electrostatic generator led to the device being widely known as the Wimshurst machine. In 1885, one of the largest Wimshurst machines was built in England (and is now at the Chicago Museum of Science and Industry).

Wimshurst became a member of the Institution of Electrical Engineers in 1889. In 1891, he reported a machine that generated high-tension alternating currents. In 1896, his multiple-disk machines (up to 8 disks) found a new use as Roentgen ray generators for radiography and electrotherapy. For this contribution to medical science, he was elected a Fellow of the Royal Society in 1898. He died in Clapham, South West London, England, at the age of 70. In an episode of BBC's The Repair Shop broadcast in January 2022, his great-great-grandson Nick Wimshurst brought his personal twelve-disc Wimshurst machine, which had been kept in the family, for repair.

== Membership and honors ==
- Fellow of the Royal Society (1898)
- Institution of Electrical Engineers (1889)
- Physical Society
- Röntgen Society
- Institution of Naval Architects

== Publications ==
- "Static Electricity. The “Influence Machine”: How to Make It and How to Use It", 1896.
- "A Book of Rules for the Construction of Steam Vessels", 1898.

== References and external links ==
- S. E. Fryer, Wimshurst, James (1832–1903), rev. Arne Hessenbruch, Oxford Dictionary of National Biography, Oxford University Press, 2004 accessed 28 March 2006
- Antonio Carlos M. de Queiroz, James Wimshurst, coe.ufrj.br. (Portuguese)
