= Wimshurst machine =

Electrostatic generator

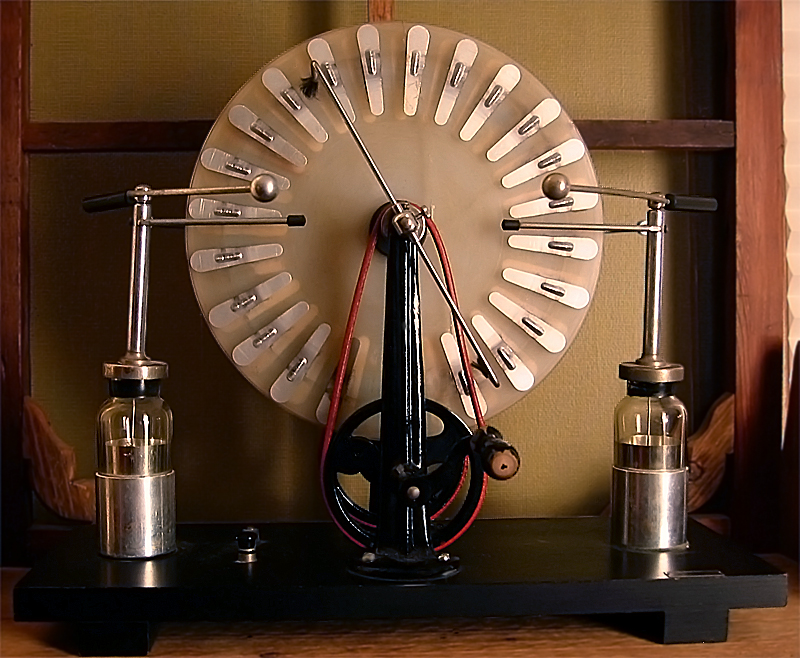
- Wimshurst machine with two Leyden jars
- Type: electrostatic generator
- Inventor: James Wimshurst
- Inception: c. 1880

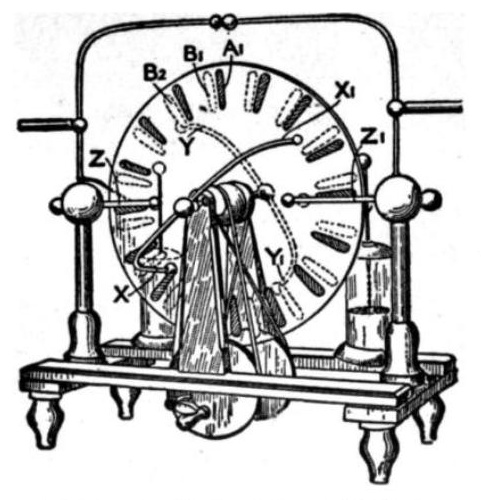
An engineering drawing of a Wimshurst machine, from Hawkins Electrical Guide

Wimshurst machine in operation

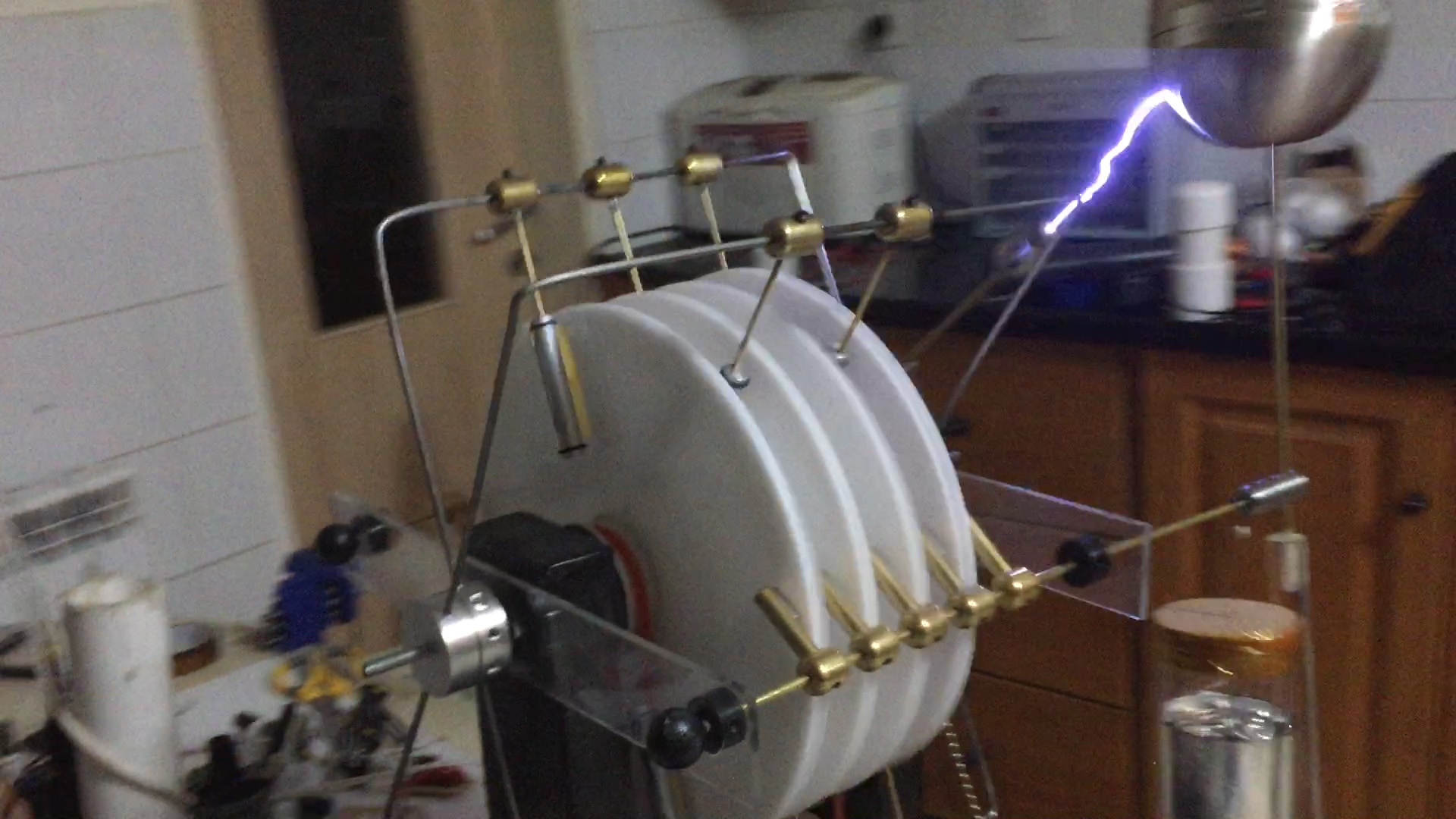
Quadruple sector-less Wimshurst machine

The Wimshurst machine or Wimshurst influence machine is an electrostatic generator capable of generating high voltages. It was developed between 1880 and 1883 by British inventor James Wimshurst (1832–1903).

It has a distinctive appearance with two large contra-rotating discs mounted in a vertical plane, two crossed bars with metallic brushes, and a spark gap formed by two metal spheres.

== Design ==
These machines belong to a class of electrostatic generators called influence machines, which separate electric charges through electrostatic induction, or influence, not depending on friction for their operation. Earlier machines in this class were developed by Wilhelm Holtz (1865 and 1867), August Toepler (1865), J. Robert Voss (1880), and others. The older machines are less efficient and exhibit an unpredictable tendency to switch their polarity, while the Wimshurst machine has neither defect.

In a Wimshurst machine, the two insulated discs and their metal sectors rotate in opposite directions passing the crossed metal neutralizer bars and their brushes. An imbalance of charges is induced, amplified, and collected by two pairs of brushes or metal combs with points placed near the surfaces of each disc. These collectors are mounted on insulating supports and connected to the output terminals. The positive feedback increases the accumulating charges exponentially until the dielectric breakdown voltage of the air is reached and an electric spark jumps across the gap.

The machine is theoretically not self-starting, meaning that if none of the sectors on the discs has any electrical charge, there is nothing to induce charges on other sectors. In practice, even a small residual charge on any sector is enough to start the process going once the discs start to rotate. The machine will work satisfactorily only in a dry atmosphere. It requires mechanical power to turn the disks against the electric field, and it is this energy that the machine converts into the electric power of the spark. The insulation and size of the machine determine the maximal output voltage that can be reached. The accumulated spark energy can be increased by adding a pair of Leyden jars, an early type of capacitor suitable for high voltages, with the jars' inner plates independently connected to each of the output terminals and the jars’ outer plates interconnected. A typical Wimshurst machine can produce sparks that are about a third of the disc's diameter in length and several tens of microamperes.

== Operation ==
Animation

The two contra-rotating insulating discs have an even number of metal sectors stuck onto them. The machine is provided with four small brushes, two on each side of the machine on the neutralizer bars, plus a pair of charge-collection brushes or combs. These are typically mounted along the horizontal and contact the sectors on both front and back discs. They are usually connected to respective Leyden jars. The neutralizer bars that momentarily connect opposite sectors together form the shape of an "X". The angle of these bars can typically be varied from 30° to the horizontal to 60°. It is essential that the neutralizer bars are angled in such a way that the sectors on the discs connect with the neutralizer bar before reaching the vertical position. For example, if a disc is rotating clockwise when viewed from the front, the neutralizer bar must be angled from top left to bottom right.

Any small charge on either of the two discs suffices to begin the charging process. Suppose, therefore, that some of the sectors on the front disc ([A] lower chain) are positively charged (red) and that the front disc rotates counter-clockwise (right to left). As the charged sector (moving red square) rotates to the position of the brush on the rear neutralizer bar ([Y] down arrow tip) it induces a polarization of charge on the neutralizer bar ([Y-Y1] upper horizontal black line) attracting negative (green) charge to the sector immediately opposite it ([Y] upper square becoming green) and positive (red) charge on the sector across the disc 180 degrees away ([Y1] upper square becoming red). When this latter positive charge reaches the place where the front neutralizer bar is ([X]) it induces a negative charge on the sector on the front disc ([X] lower square becoming green) and simultaneously a positive (red) charge on the sector on the opposite side of the disc ([X1] becoming red). The positive charges are collected from both sides of the discs at [Z] and [Z] and the negative charges are collected on the other side of the discs (not labelled on the diagram).

The process repeats, with each charge on A inducing charges on B, inducing more charges on A, etc. This process, by itself, will not, however, produce the high voltages which are actually obtained because the charge induced on B will necessarily be smaller than the charge inducing it on A. The exponential increase in voltage is due to the fact that any voltage which appears on the poles of the machine generates an electric field across the machine which contributes enormously to the polarization of the neutralizer bars. Obviously, the bigger the voltage across the poles, the greater the degree of polarization and the faster the machine charges up. In the end, this positive feedback loop is more important than the charge transfer process described above which serves merely to get the process going. The energy generated by the machine is derived from the work done in separating the charges on the sectors from the charges on the polarized neutralizer bars at the time when they break contact.

The ultimate potential difference which can be achieved is limited principally by the maximum voltage which can be sustained across the sectors on the discs between the neutralizer bars (which are always at zero potential) and the poles. This distance is maximised when the neutraliser bars are as near vertical as possible. (Of course, if the bars were actually vertical, the electric field would not polarize them and the machine would cease to work.)

== Applications ==
Wimshurst machines were used during the 19th century in physics research. They were also occasionally used to generate high voltage to power the first-generation Crookes X-ray tubes during the first two decades of the 20th century, although Holtz machines and induction coils were more commonly used. Today they are used only in science museums and education to demonstrate the principles of electrostatics.

== See also ==
- Kelvin water dropper – Type of electrostatic generator
- Pelletron – Type of electrostatic generator
- Tesla coil – Electrical resonant transformer circuit invented by Nikola Tesla
- Van de Graaff generator – Electrostatic generator operating on the triboelectric effect
