= Vaneless ion wind generator =

A vaneless ion wind generator or power fence is a device that generates electrical energy by using the wind to move charged particles across an electric field.

Ion wind generators are not commercially available, though working prototypes and proofs of concept have been created. Several prototypes exist in the Netherlands, one of which resides in Delft University of Technology, whose researchers developed some of the underlying technology. Ion wind generators are currently experimental, while conventional wind turbines are the most common form of wind energy generation. But ion wind generators, which have no moving parts, could be used in urban settings where wind turbines are impractical due to vibrational noise, moving shadows, and danger posed to birds.

== History ==
Lord Kelvin's Thunderstorm directs oppositely charged droplets of water into metal reservoirs to create a voltage difference.

=== Lord Kelvin's Thunderstorm ===
One of the earliest examples of electrostatic energy generation is found in Lord Kelvin's Thunderstorm, a device invented in 1867. Similar to ion wind generators, the Thunderstorm used water to carry charges and generate energy through related principles. However, the Thunderstorm relied on the force of gravity and two oppositely charged reservoirs to generate a voltage difference. Though they are not identical in operation, Lord Kelvin's Thunderstorm demonstrates the behavior of water and concepts of electrostatics that underpin modern ion wind generators.

== Design and construction ==
=== Theoretical operation ===
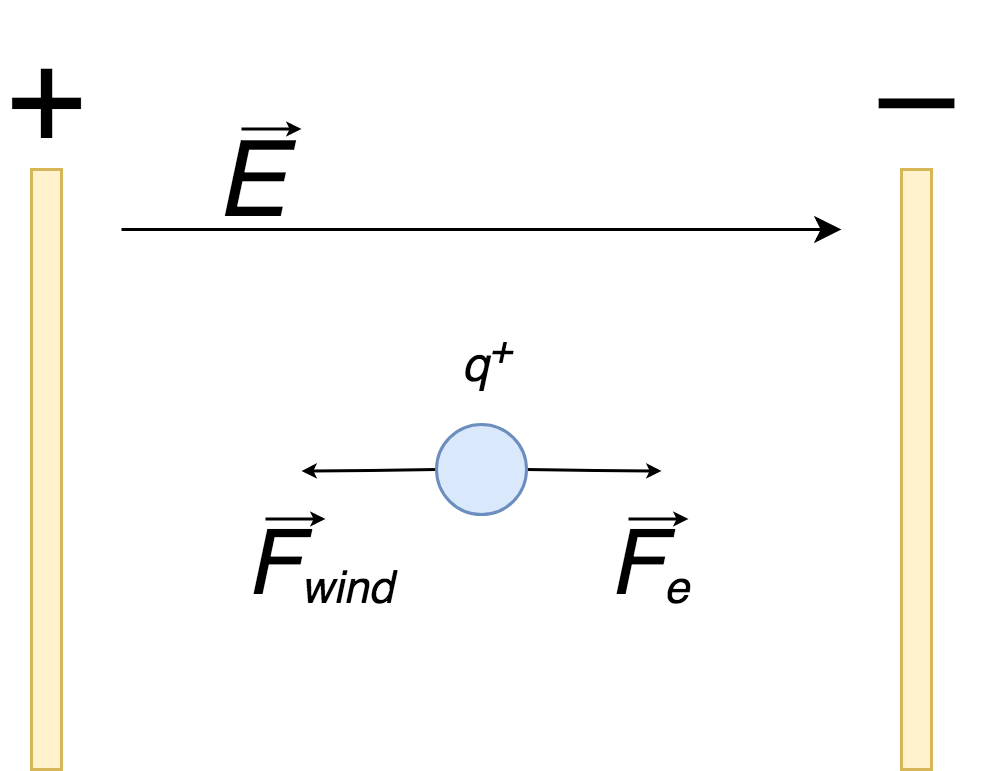
Wind exerts a force on a positively charged particle in the direction of the positive electrode. Its potential energy increases as the wind works against the electric field.

Ion wind generators use the force of the wind to move charged particles, typically water, against the force of an electric field. This increases the potential energy of the particles, which can be likened to moving a mass upwards against the force of gravity. The method of collecting the energy varies by implementation.

The design of ion wind generators eliminates the intermediate conversion of mechanical energy undergone in wind turbines. Wind turbines use the kinetic energy of the wind to rotate several blades about a rotor. The rotor's mechanical energy is converted into electrical energy by an electric generator.

Conversion between different forms of energy necessitates some energy loss, either to the environment or in a useless form, and fewer conversions improve theoretical output.

==== Simplified analytical model ====
Researchers from Delft University of Technology devised an equation to model the behavior of the water droplets as they move through the air in order to optimize the system mathematically and run computer simulations. For the purposes of the model, a simple electrode configuration and uniform electric field is assumed, wherein the electric force exerted on the particles will be directly opposite that of the wind.

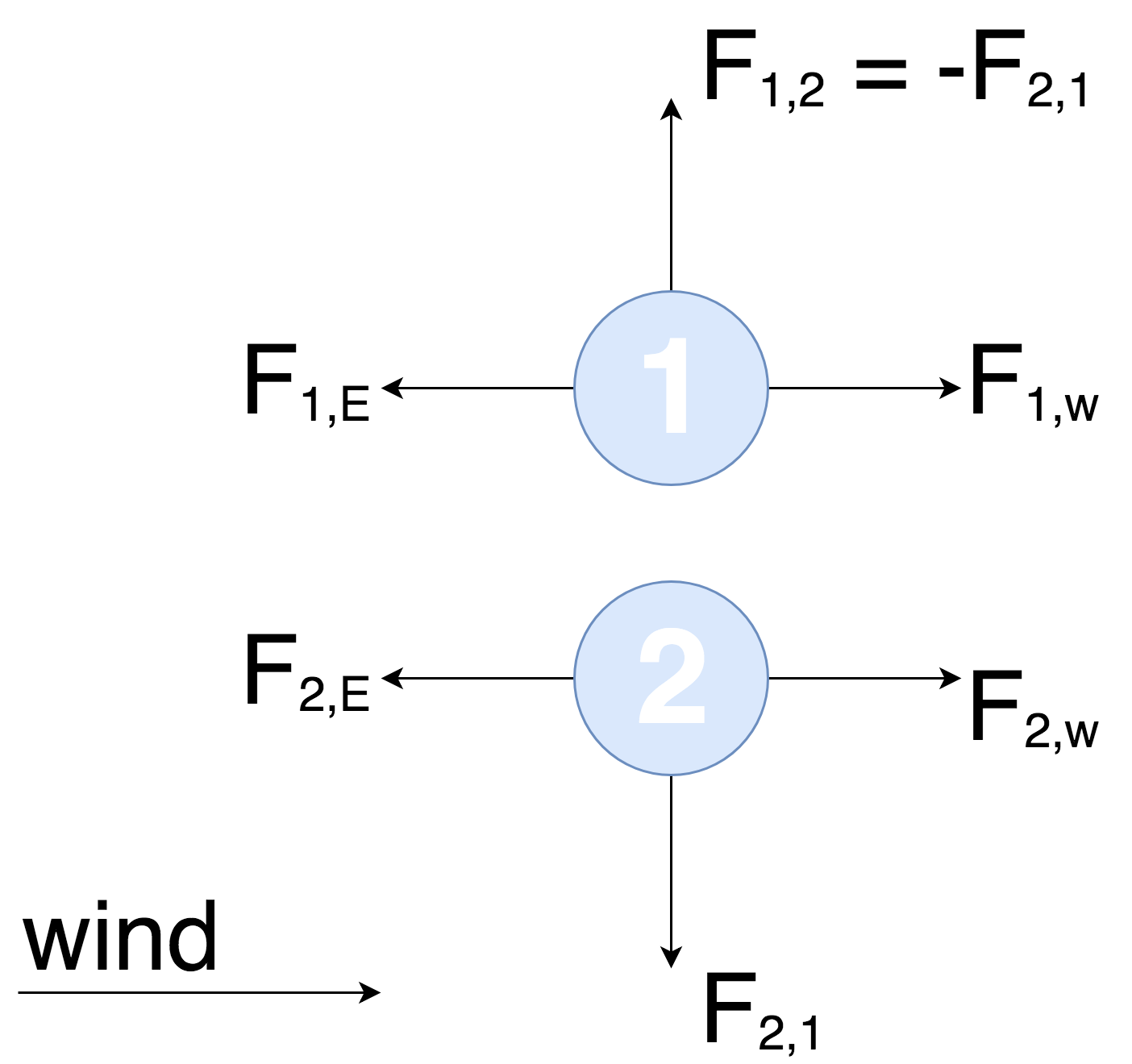
Two droplets acted upon by wind and a uniform electric field, whose equal charges repel one other

Each particle is acted upon by the force of gravity,

$$\overset{\rightarrow}{F}_{i,g}=m_{i}\cdot\overset{\rightarrow}{g}$$

where $m_{i}$ is the mass of the i^{th} droplet and $\overset{\rightarrow}{g}$ is the gravitational acceleration of Earth. The model assumes $m_{i}$ is constant and does not take evaporation into account. The atmosphere also exerts a force in the form of buoyancy as the droplets fall,

$$\overset{\rightarrow}{F}_{i,B}=-\rho_{a}\cdot V_{d}\cdot \overset{\rightarrow}{g}$$

where $V_{d}$ is the volume of the droplet and $\rho_{a}$ is the air density. The droplets are also acted upon by the wind,

$$\overset{\rightarrow}{F}_{i,w}=\frac{\pi}{8}\cdot C_{d}\cdot \rho_{a}\cdot d^2\cdot\left|\overset{\rightarrow}{v}_{w}-\overset{\rightarrow}{v}_{d}\right|^2\cdot\frac{\overset{\rightarrow}{v}_{w}-\overset{\rightarrow}{v}_{d}}{|\overset{\rightarrow}{v}_{w}-\overset{\rightarrow}{v}_{d}|}$$

where $C_{d}$ is the drag coefficient, $v_{w}$ is the wind speed, and $v_{d}$ is the droplet speed. The equation may be simplified in cases of laminar flow, which can be expressed using the Reynolds Number (Re), which is used in fluid mechanics to determine flow patterns. The flow is considered laminar when the Reynolds Number is less than 1,

$$Re=\frac{\rho_a \cdot d \cdot | \vec{v}_w - \vec{v}_d | }{\eta_a} < 1$$

where $\eta_a$ is the viscosity of air. When the flow is indeed laminar, the drag force can be calculated using Stokes' law,

$$\overset{\rightarrow}{F}_{i,w}=\frac{3 \pi \cdot \eta_a \cdot d \cdot ( \vec{v}_w - \vec{v}_d ) }{C_c}$$

where $C_c$ is the Cunningham slip correction factor, which is assumed to be 1 for particles greater than 1μm in diameter.

The electric force acting on the droplets is affected by both the external electric field ($E_{ext}$) of the device's electrodes,

$$\vec{F}_{i,E} = q_i \cdot \vec{E}_{ext}$$

where $q_i$ is the charge of the i^{th} droplet, and the electric fields of other charged droplets,

$$\vec{F}_{i,j} = \frac{1}{4\pi \varepsilon_0} \cdot \frac{q_i q_j}{r^2_{i,j}} \cdot \hat{r}_{ij}$$

where $r_{i,j}$ is the distance between droplet i and droplet j. The sum of these forces represents the researchers' full equation,

$$\vec{F}_i = \vec{F}_{i,g} + \vec{F}_{i,B} + \vec{F}_{i,w} + \vec{F}_{i,B} + \vec{F}_{i,E} + \sum_{j \neq i}^i \vec{F}_{i,j} = m_i \cdot \vec{a}_i$$

where $F_i$ is the total force exerted on the i^{th} droplet and $a_i$ is the acceleration of the i^{th} droplet. The work done on the i^{th} droplet can be calculated using the previous equation,

$$W_i = \int (\vec{F}_i - \vec{F}_{i,w}) \cdot d \vec{l}$$

where $dl$ is the droplet's displacement. The researchers use this to calculate the potential energy difference for the droplet. The sum of work done on each droplet yields the total energy generated from the wind.

=== Implementations ===
There are two mainstream implementations of ion wind generators. The first, patented by Alvin Marks in 1977, was a twofold device comprising a charging system and separate collector. The EWICON is a derivative of the design that allows the system to function without the need for a separate collector.

==== Alvin Marks' patent ====
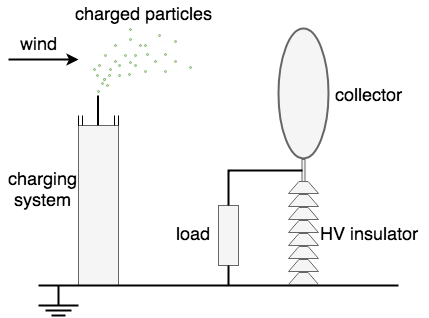
A simplified model of an ion wind generator implementation. The charging system charges and releases particles, which are carried to the collector by the wind.

A grounded charging system produces a cloud of charged particles. The wind carries the particles toward a conducting collector. The collector is insulated by its non-conducting mechanical support. Though the collector is initially neutral, the particles transfer their charge upon contact, increasing the collector's potential energy.

The charged particles and the collector, now also charged, form an electric field which exerts a force on the particles in the opposite direction of the wind. Though the force of the wind initially exceeds the force of the electric field, the continuous flow of particles increases the force of the electric field. The force may become strong enough to move the particles back towards the charging system, or they may simply pass by the collector. The particles which never reach the collector do not contribute to the net energy generation.

The system performs at maximum efficiency when all particles reach the collector. Adjusting variables such as wind speed and collector size can improve the performance of the system.

==== EWICON (Electrostatic Wind Energy Converter) ====
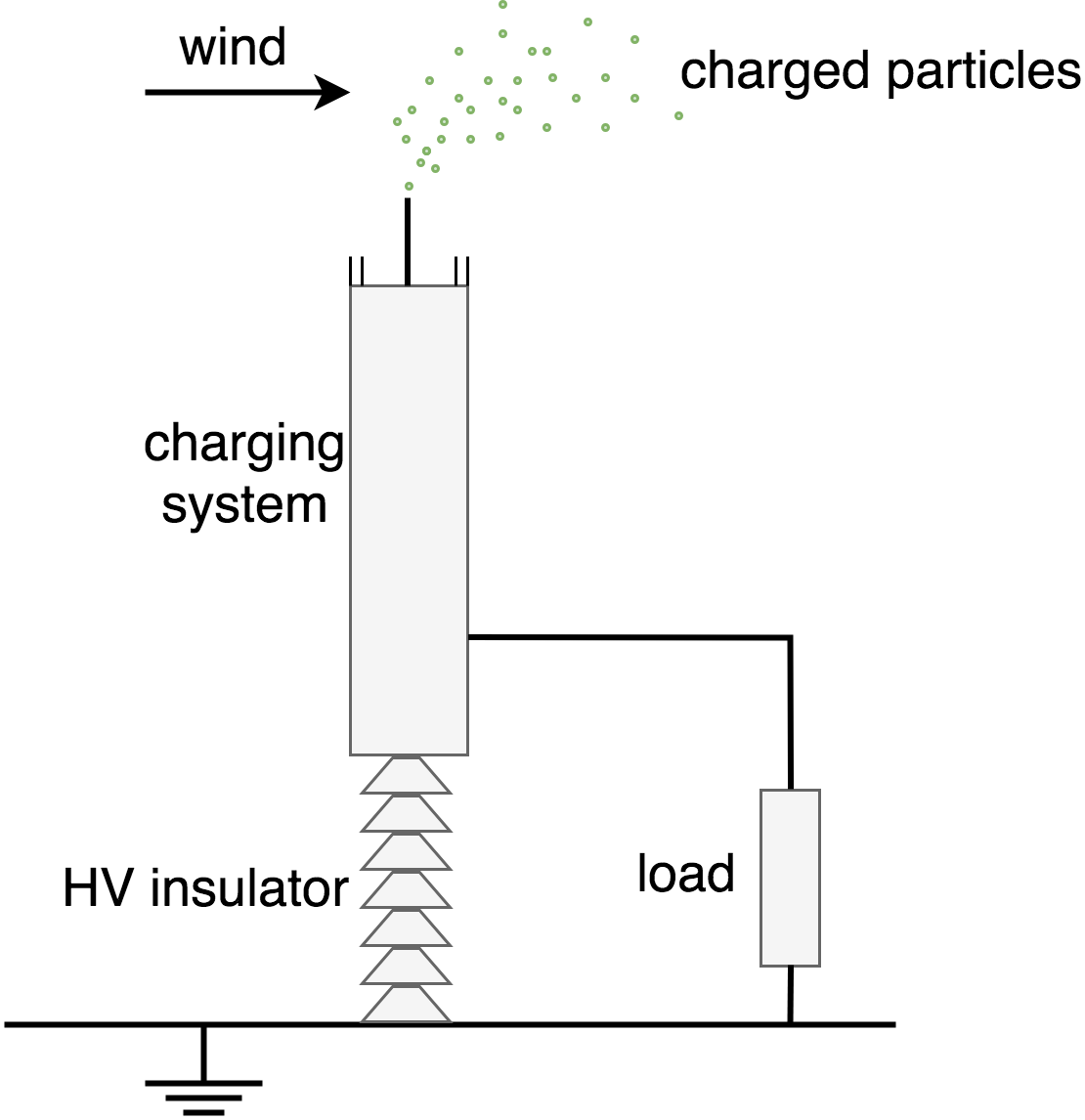
The EWICON uses the Earth as a collector. The charging system releases charged particles, which increases its potential energy.

The EWICON functions using the same principles as the previous implementation, but abandons the collector. Instead, the EWICON is insulated from the Earth, and releases charged particles into the air. The dispersal of negatively charged particles from an initially neutral system increases its potential energy. Once the charging system has a polarity, which is opposite to that of the particles, an attractive force is exerted. If there is little wind, the force may transport the particles back to the charging system, losing the net energy gained from their dispersal.

The EWICON system performs at maximum efficiency when all particles leave the charging system and reach the Earth, which acts as the collector in lieu of a secondary system.

A group of researchers from Delft University of Technology devised the system. One prototype of the device was installed on the university campus, and two more sit atop the Stadstimmerhuis 010 building located in Rotterdam. The prototypes were designed by Mecanoo, a local architecture firm in Delft.

==== The Dutch Windwheel ====
The Dutch Windwheel is a building design that is expected to incorporate EWICON technology. The plans were proposed by a partnership of three Rotterdam companies through the Dutch Windwheel Corp., who expected the building to be completed by 2022, but has not begun construction. The structure is intended to display multiple environmentally-friendly technologies, including rainwater capture, wetland water filtration, and solar energy. The center of the circular building is reserved for wind power generation through the use of a large-scale ion wind generator based on the EWICON implementation. The efficiency and power generation of the system at such a scale is not known, but the Dutch Windwheel Corp. expects the building to generate more energy than it consumes.

== Comparison with wind turbines ==
Ion wind generators and wind turbines share some of the same advantages and disadvantages. Both are subject to the conditions of the wind, and are unable to generate electricity if the weather conditions are not favorable. This can be mitigated to some degree with strategic placement of the devices in areas with more consistent wind speed.

=== Advantages ===
Ion wind generators are typically much smaller than wind turbines. Many wind turbine models exceed 400 feet (122 m) in height. Their size and complexity lead to high maintenance costs, which, when combined with the cost of operation, may account for a quarter of the total cost per kilowatt-hour. Wind turbines also produce noise which may disturb residents in the vicinity. The aerodynamic properties of wind turbine blades and inner mechanical workings produce the noise, yet both features are not present in ion wind generators. Quieter operation has led researchers to consider using the technology in urban environments. The bladeless design of ion wind generators could make wind power more environmentally friendly, as current "wind power plants represent a risk of bird mortality." Wind turbines have maximum speeds of operation which vary by design. Wind turbines shut down when "cut-out" speeds are exceeded to prevent damage. Therefore, turbines are unable to generate energy in high speed winds which fall beyond the window of performance, while ion wind generators can theoretically continue to operate.

=== Disadvantages ===
The technology is still in its nascence, and ion wind generators are not as efficient as conventional wind turbines. During tests conducted in 2005, the EWICON was unable to match wind turbine output. Researchers were able to demonstrate "a conversion of 7% of the wind energy into electrical energy, whereas conventional wind turbine systems have an efficiency of 45% at their rated speeds. Improvements are suggested that could lead to an efficiency of the EWICON in the range of 25–30%." At the 2005 International Conference on Future Power Systems, suggestions for future advancements included changes to the method of electrohydrodynamic atomization, or electrospray, and designing a more dense array of nozzles. Tests have yet to indicate that the technology has developed enough to rival wind turbines in efficiency. Several prototypes have been built for testing and experimentation, but researchers hope to build a larger device with greater power output. While the current level of development does not surpass wind turbines in efficiency, the technology could contribute to the energy mix in urban environments where a wind turbine may be impractical.

== See also ==
- Renewable energy
- Energy conversion efficiency
- Distributed generation
- Electrohydrodynamics
- Electrospray
- Electrospray ionization

== Patents ==
* U.S. patent 4,206,396: Charged aerosol generator with uni-electrode source (Alvin Marks)
- U.S. patent 4,433,248: Charged aerosol wind/electric power generator with solar and/or gravitational regeneration (Alvin Marks)
