= Edward Nairne =

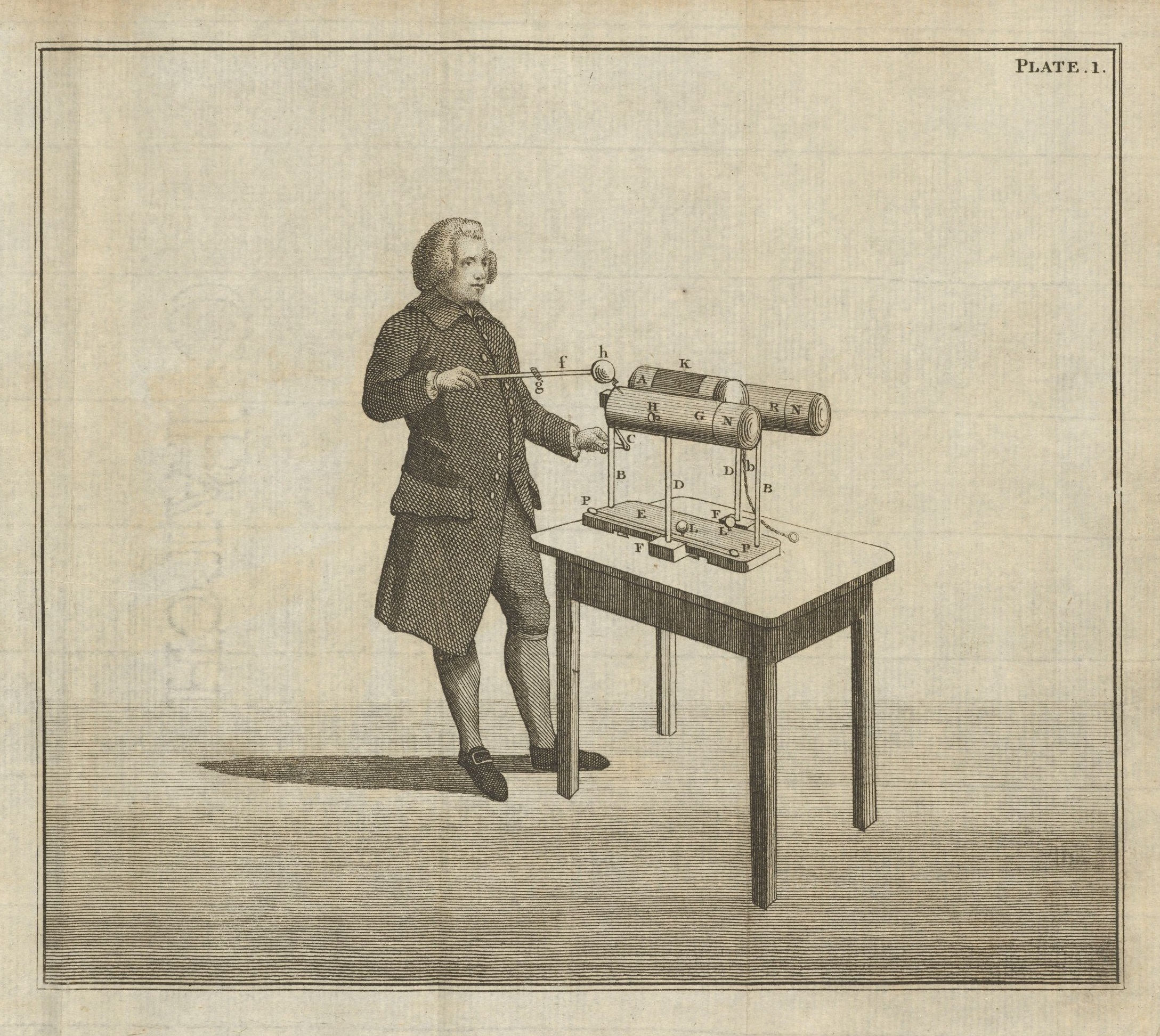
1783 illustration of Nairne and his electrical machine

Edward Nairne (1726 – 1 September 1806) was an English optician and scientific instrument maker.

== Biography ==
Nairne was born in Sandwich, Kent in 1726. He was apprenticed to the optician Matthew Loft in 1741 and established his own business at 20 Cornhill in London after Loft's death in 1748.

Nairne patented several electrical machines, including an electrostatic generator consisting of a glass cylinder mounted on glass insulators; the device can supply either positive or negative electricity, and was intended for medicinal use. In the eighth edition of the instruction manual for this device he claimed that "electricity is almost a specific in some disorders, and deserves to be held in the highest estimation for its efficacy in many others". He recommended its use for nervous disorders, bruises, burns, scales, bloodshot eyes, toothache, sciatica, epilepsy, hysteria, agues and so on. He also made improvements to the Cuff microscope, building it into a portable case and calling it a chest microscope.

In the early 1700s, Edward Nairne constructed the first successful marine barometer by constricting the glass tube between the cistern and register plate. The instrument was suspended from gimbals mounted within a freestanding frame to provide additional stability. Nairne's first marine barometer was sent on James Cook's second voyage to the South Pacific.

One of the earliest references to rubber in Europe appears to be in 1770, Joseph Priestley commented in a note following the preface to his "Perspectives" that Edward Nairne was selling cubes of a substance at his shop at 20 Cornhill. The cubes, meant to be erasers, sold for the astonishingly high price of 3 shillings per half-inch cube and lasted several years. Prior to using rubber, breadcrumbs were used as erasers. Nairne says he inadvertently picked up a piece of rubber instead of breadcrumbs, discovered its erasing properties, and began selling rubber erasers.

Nairne was a regular contributor to the Philosophical Transactions of the Royal Society of London, and was elected a fellow of that institution in 1776. He enjoyed an extensive international reputation, and was in correspondence with Benjamin Franklin for whom he made a set of magnets and a telescope around 1758. In 1770 he was elected a member of the American Philosophical Society, which was founded by Franklin. Also on Franklin's recommendation, he was asked to supply instruments for the fire-damaged collection at Harvard University.

He died 1 September 1806 in London, England.

== Gallery ==
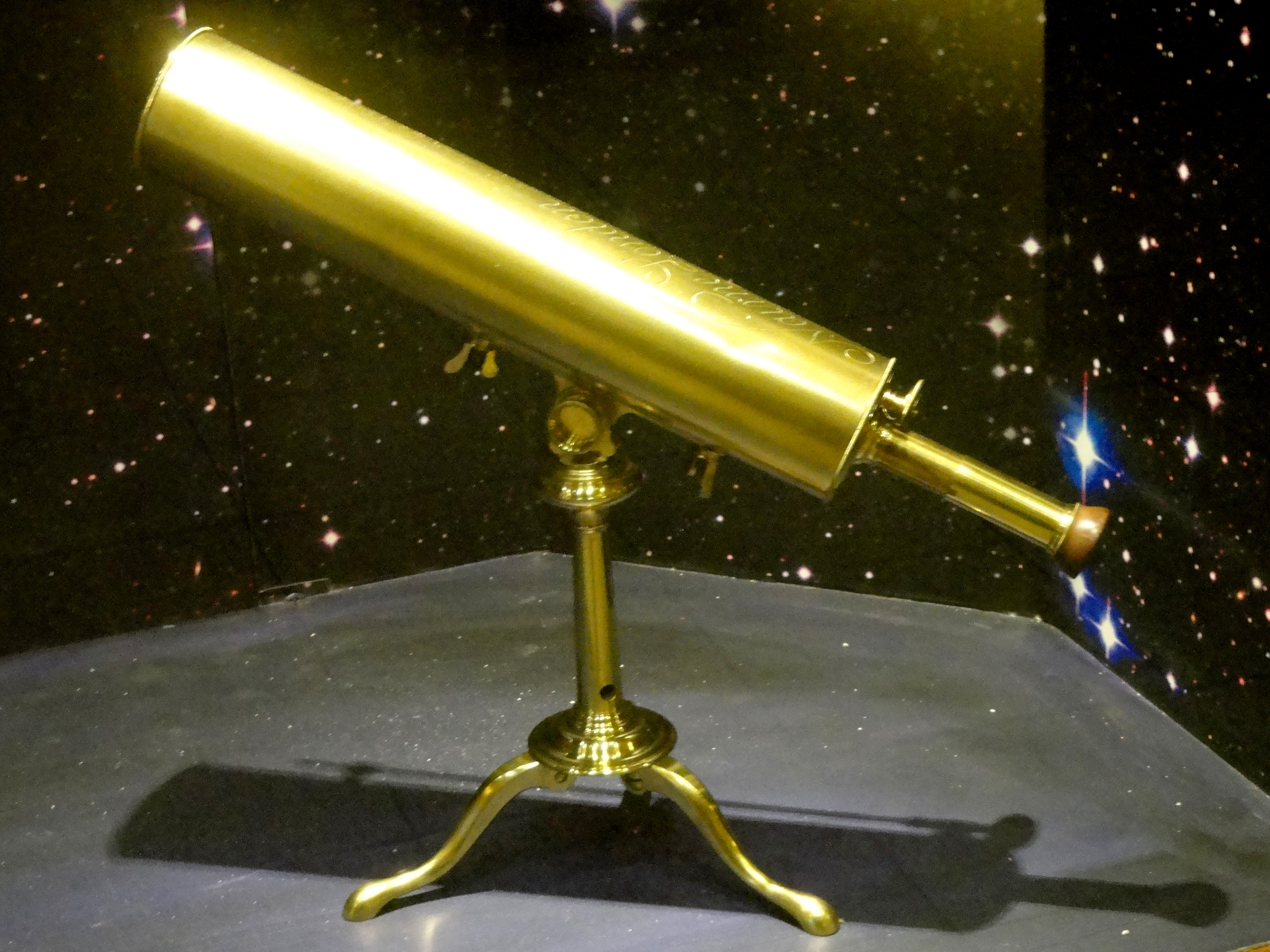
Telescope by Nairne, London, late 1700s

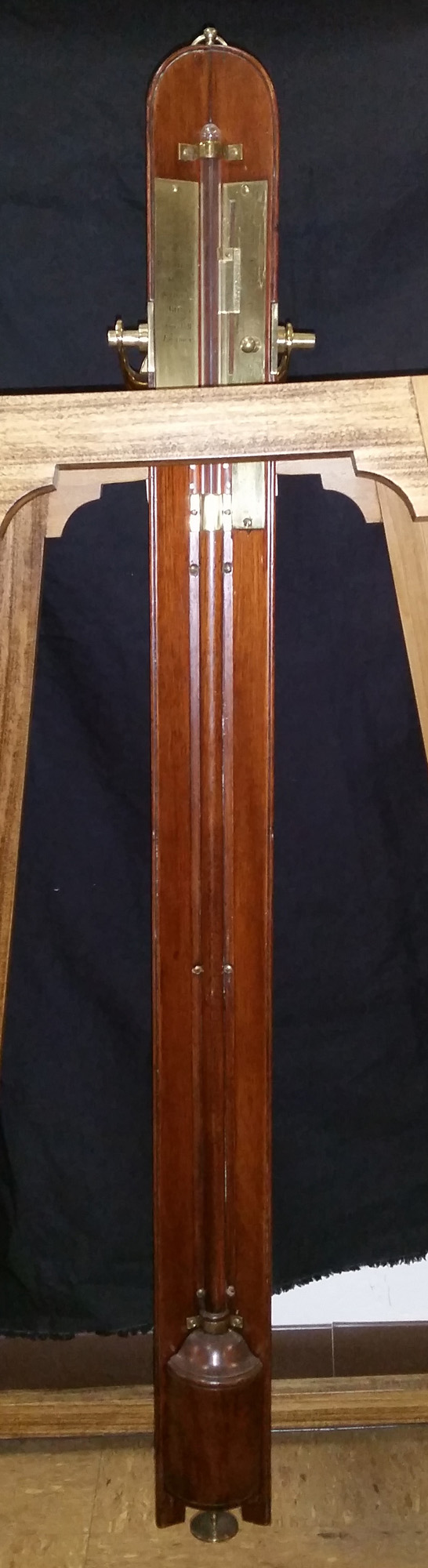
Nairne & Blunt barometer, ca 1780, in the collection of The Mariners' Museum

== External articles ==
General

- "Nairne and Blunt Electrostatic Generator". The Bakken, June, 2004.

Publications

- Nairne, Edward, "Directions for using the electrical machine; ". London, 1764. (ed. engraved by J. Couse; Advertisement)
- Nairne, Edward, "Description of the electric machine". Paris, 1784.
- Nairne, Edward, "The description and use of Nairne's patent electrical machine : with the addition of some philosophical experiments and medical observations". London (Nairne and Blunt), 1783. LCCN 85664571 //r90
