= Triboelectric effect =

Charge transfer due to contact or sliding

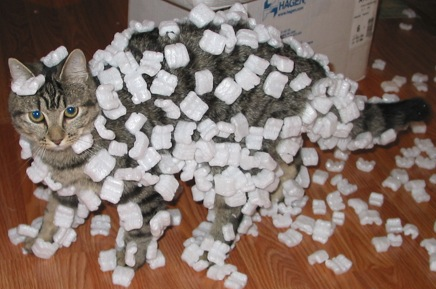
Styrofoam peanuts clinging to a cat's fur due to static electricity

The triboelectric effect (also known as triboelectricity, triboelectric charging, triboelectrification, or tribocharging) describes electric charge transfer between two objects when they contact or slide against each other. It can occur with different materials, such as the sole of a shoe on a carpet, or between two pieces of the same material. It is ubiquitous, and occurs with differing amounts of charge transfer (tribocharge) for all solid materials. There is evidence that tribocharging can occur between combinations of solids, liquids and gases, for instance liquid flowing in a solid tube or an aircraft flying through air.

Often static electricity is a consequence of the triboelectric effect when the charge stays on one or both of the objects and is not conducted away. The term triboelectricity has been used to refer to the field of study or the general phenomenon of the triboelectric effect, or to the static electricity that results from it. When there is no sliding, tribocharging is sometimes called contact electrification, and any static electricity generated is sometimes called contact electricity. The terms are often used interchangeably, and may be confused.

Triboelectric charge plays a major role in industries such as packaging of pharmaceutical powders, and in many processes such as dust storms and planetary formation. It can also increase friction and adhesion. While many aspects of the triboelectric effect are now understood and extensively documented, significant disagreements remain in the current literature about the underlying details.

== History ==
The historical development of triboelectricity is interwoven with work on static electricity and electrons themselves. Experiments involving triboelectricity and static electricity occurred well before the discovery of the electron. The name ēlektron (ἤλεκτρον) is Greek for amber, which is connected to the recording of electrostatic charging by Thales of Miletus around 585 BC, and possibly others even earlier. The prefix tribo- (Greek for 'rub') refers to sliding, friction and related processes, as in tribology.

From the axial age (8th to 3rd century BC) the attraction of materials due to static electricity by rubbing amber and the attraction of magnetic materials were considered to be similar or the same. There are indications that it was known both in Europe and outside, for instance China and other places. Syrian women used amber whorls in weaving and exploited the triboelectric properties, as noted by Pliny the Elder.

The effect was mentioned in records from the medieval period. Archbishop Eustathius of Thessalonica, Greek scholar and writer of the 12th century, records that Woliver, king of the Goths, could draw sparks from his body. He also states that a philosopher was able, while dressing, to draw sparks from his clothes, similar to the report by Robert Symmer of his silk stocking experiments, which may be found in the 1759 Philosophical Transactions.

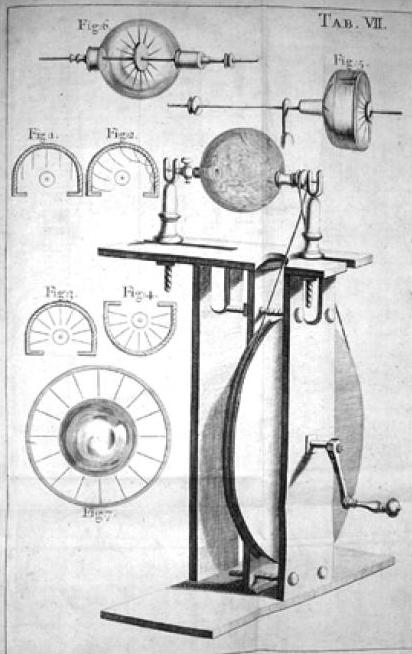
Generator built by Francis Hauksbee

It is generally considered that the first major scientific analysis was by William Gilbert in his publication De Magnete in 1600. He discovered that many more materials than amber such as sulphur, wax, glass could produce static electricity when rubbed, and that moisture prevented electrification. Others such as Sir Thomas Browne made important contributions slightly later, both in terms of materials and the first use of the word electricity in Pseudodoxia Epidemica. He noted that metals did not show triboelectric charging, perhaps because the charge was conducted away. An important step was around 1663 when Otto von Guericke invented a machine that could automate triboelectric charge generation, making it much easier to produce more tribocharge; other electrostatic generators followed. For instance, shown in the Figure is an electrostatic generator built by Francis Hauksbee the Younger. Another key development was in the 1730s when C. F. du Fay pointed out that there were two types of charge which he named vitreous and resinous. These names corresponded to the glass (vitreous) rods and bituminous coal, amber, or sealing wax (resinous) used in du Fay's experiments. These names were used throughout the 19th century. The use of the terms positive and negative for types of electricity grew out of the independent work of Benjamin Franklin around 1747 where he ascribed electricity to an over- or under- abundance of an electrical fluid.

At about the same time Johan Carl Wilcke published in his 1757 PhD thesis a triboelectric series. In this work, materials were listed in order of the polarity of charge separation when they are touched or slide against another. A material towards the bottom of the series, when touched to a material near the top of the series, will acquire a more negative charge.

The first systematic analysis of triboelectricity is considered to be the work of Jean Claude Eugène Péclet in 1834. He studied triboelectric charging for a range of conditions such as the material, pressure and rubbing of surfaces. It was some time before there were further quantitative works by Owen in 1909 and Jones in 1915. The most extensive early set of experimental analyses was from 1914–1930 by the group of Professor Shaw, who laid much of the foundation of experimental knowledge. In a series of papers he: was one of the first to mention some of the failings of the triboelectric series, also showing that heat had a major effect on tribocharging; analyzed in detail where different materials would fall in a triboelectric series, at the same time pointing out anomalies; separately analyzed glass and solid elements and solid elements and textiles, carefully measuring both tribocharging and friction; analyzed charging due to air-blown particles; demonstrated that surface strain and relaxation played a critical role for a range of materials, and examined the tribocharging of many different elements with silica.

Much of this work predates an understanding of solid state variations of energies levels with position, and also band bending. It was in the early 1950s in the work of authors such as Vick that these were taken into account along with concepts such as quantum tunnelling and behavior such as Schottky barrier effects, as well as including models such as asperities for contacts based upon the work of Frank Philip Bowden and David Tabor.

== Basic characteristics ==
Triboelectric charging occurs when two materials are brought into contact then separated, or slide against each other. An example is rubbing a plastic pen on a shirt sleeve made of cotton, wool, polyester, or the blended fabrics used in modern clothing. An electrified pen will attract and pick up pieces of paper less than a square centimeter, and will repel a similarly electrified pen. This repulsion is detectable by hanging both pens on threads and setting them near one another. Such experiments led to the theory of two types of electric charge, one being the negative of the other, with a simple sum respecting signs giving the total charge. The electrostatic attraction of the charged plastic pen to neutral uncharged pieces of paper (for example) is due to induced dipoles in the paper.

The triboelectric effect can be unpredictable because many details are often not controlled. Phenomena which do not have a simple explanation have been known for many years. For instance, as early as 1910, Jaimeson observed that for a piece of cellulose, the sign of the charge depended on whether it was bent concave or convex during rubbing. The same behavior with curvature was reported in 1917 by Shaw, who noted that the effect of curvature with different materials made them either more positive or negative. In 1920, Richards pointed out that for colliding particles the velocity and mass played a role, not just what the materials were. In 1926, Shaw pointed out that with two pieces of identical material, the sign of the charge transfer from "rubber" to "rubbed" could change with time.

There are other more recent experimental results which also do not have a simple explanation. For instance the work of Burgo and Erdemir, which showed that the sign of charge transfer reverses between when a tip is pushing into a substrate versus when it pulls out; the detailed work of Lee et al. and Forward, Lacks and Sankaran and others measuring the charge transfer during collisions between particles of zirconia of different size but the same composition, with one size charging positive, the other negative; the observations using sliding or Kelvin probe force microscope of inhomogeneous charge variations between nominally identical materials.

Illustration of triboelectric charging from contacting asperities

The details of how and why tribocharging occurs are not established science as of 2023. One component is the difference in the work function (also called the electron affinity) between the two materials. This can lead to charge transfer as, for instance, analyzed by Harper. As has been known since at least 1953, the contact potential is part of the process but does not explain many results, such as the ones mentioned in the last two paragraphs. Many studies have pointed out issues with the work function difference (Volta potential) as a complete explanation. There is also the question of why sliding is often important. Surfaces have many nanoscale asperities where the contact is taking place, which has been taken into account in many approaches to triboelectrification. Alessandro Volta and Hermann von Helmholtz suggested that the role of sliding was to produce more contacts per second. In modern terms, the idea is that electrons move many times faster than atoms, so the electrons are always in equilibrium when atoms move (the Born–Oppenheimer approximation). With this approximation, each asperity contact during sliding is equivalent to a stationary one; there is no direct coupling between the sliding velocity and electron motion. An alternative view (beyond the Born–Oppenheimer approximation) is that sliding acts as a quantum mechanical pump which can excite electrons to go from one material to another. A different suggestion is that local heating during sliding matters, an idea first suggested by Frenkel in 1941. Other papers have considered that local bending at the nanoscale produces voltages which help drive charge transfer via the flexoelectric effect. There are also suggestions that surface or trapped charges are important. More recently there have been attempts to include a full solid state description.

== Explanations and mechanisms ==
From early work starting around the end of the 19th century a large amount of information is available about what, empirically, causes triboelectricity. While there is extensive experimental data on triboelectricity there is not as yet full scientific consensus on the source, or perhaps more probably the sources. Some aspects are established, and will be part of the full picture:

- Work function differences between the two materials.
- Local curvature, strain and roughness.
- The forces used during sliding, and the velocities when particles collide as well as the sizes.
- The electronic structure of the materials, and the crystallographic orientation of the two contacting materials.
- Surface or interface states, as well as environmental factors such as humidity.

=== Triboelectric series ===
A simple triboelectric series

An empirical approach to triboelectricity is a triboelectric series. This is a list of materials ordered by how they develop a charge relative to other materials on the list. Johan Carl Wilcke published the first one in a 1757 paper. The series was expanded by Shaw and Henniker by including natural and synthetic polymers, and included alterations in the sequence depending on surface and environmental conditions. Lists vary somewhat as to the order of some materials.

Another triboelectric series based on measuring the triboelectric charge density of materials was proposed by the group of Zhong Lin Wang. The triboelectric charge density of the tested materials was measured with respect to liquid mercury in a glove box under well-defined conditions, with fixed temperature, pressure and humidity.

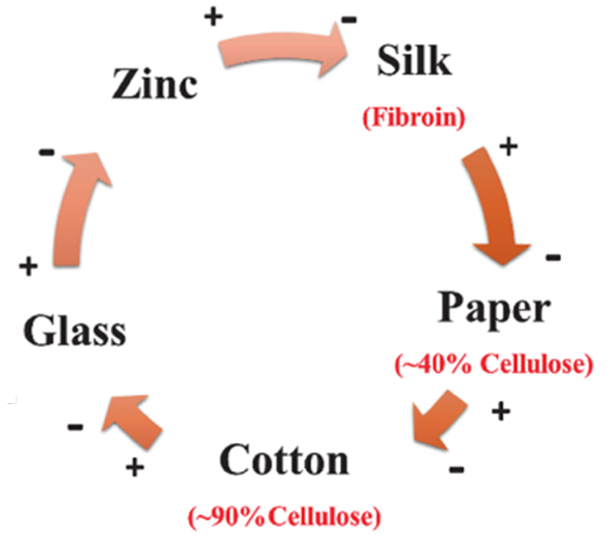
Cyclic triboelectric series example, illustrating that a linear approach does not work in practice

It is known that this approach is too simple and unreliable. There are many observed cases of triboelectric interactions that are intransitive with respect to the materials involved, an issue mentioned by Shaw in 1914. There exist materials A, B, and C, where A charges positively when rubbed against B, B charges positively when rubbed against C, and C charges positively when rubbed against A. This cyclic relation cannot be explained by a linear triboelectric series. Furthermore, there are many cases where charging occurs with contact between two pieces of the same material. This has been modelled as a consequence of the electric fields from local bending (flexoelectricity).

=== Work function differences ===
When the two metals depicted here are in thermodynamic equilibrium with each other as shown (equal Fermi levels), the vacuum electrostatic potential ϕ is not flat due to a difference in work function.

In all materials there is a positive electrostatic potential from the positive atomic nuclei, partially balanced by a negative electrostatic potential of what can be described as a sea of electrons. The average potential is positive, what is called the mean inner potential (MIP). Different materials have different MIPs, depending upon the types of atoms and how close they are. At a surface the electrons also spill out a little into the vacuum, as analyzed in detail by Lang and Kohn. This leads to a dipole at the surface. Combined, the dipole and the MIP lead to a potential barrier for electrons to leave a material which is called the work function.

A rationalization of the triboelectric series is that different members have different work functions, so electrons can go from the material with a small work function to one with a large. The potential difference between the two materials is called the Volta potential, also called the contact potential. Experiments have validated the importance of this for metals and other materials. However, because the surface dipoles vary for different surfaces of any solid the contact potential is not a universal parameter. By itself it cannot explain many of the results which were established in the early 20th century.

For completeness, it should be mentioned that the original concept of a Volta potential came from a model to explain the function of an electric battery (Voltaic pile). The concept was a simplified form where contact between two metals led to a force to transfer electrons, what is called contact tension. This was extensively debated in the 19th century, the conclusion being that this was not the driving force for battery operation.

=== Electromechanical contributions ===
Whenever a solid is strained, electric fields can be generated. One process is due to linear strains, and is called piezoelectricity, the second depends upon how rapidly strains are changing with distance (derivative) and is called flexoelectricity. Both are established science, and can be both measured and calculated using density functional theory methods. Because flexoelectricity depends upon a gradient it can be much larger at the nanoscale during sliding or contact of asperity between two objects.

There has been considerable work on the connection between piezoelectricity and triboelectricity. While it can be important, piezoelectricity only occurs in the small number of materials which do not have inversion symmetry, so it is not a general explanation. It has recently been suggested that flexoelectricity may be very important in triboelectricity as it occurs in all insulators and semiconductors. Quite a few of the experimental results such as the effect of curvature can be explained by this approach, although full details have not as yet been determined. There is also early work from Shaw and Hanstock, and from the group of Daniel Lacks demonstrating that strain matters.

=== Capacitor charge compensation model ===
Capacitor schematic with dielectric

An explanation that has appeared in different forms is analogous to charge on a capacitor. If there is a potential difference between two materials due to the difference in their work functions (contact potential), this can be thought of as equivalent to the potential difference across a capacitor. The charge to compensate this is that which cancels the electric field. If an insulating dielectric is in between the two materials, then this will lead to a polarization density $\mathbf P$ and a bound surface charge of $\mathbf P \cdot \mathbf n$, where $\mathbf n$ is the surface normal. The total charge in the capacitor is then the combination of the bound surface charge from the polarization and that from the potential.

The triboelectric charge from this compensation model has been frequently considered as a key component. If the additional polarization due to strain (piezoelectricity) or bending of samples (flexoelectricity) is included this can explain observations such as the effect of curvature or inhomogeneous charging.

=== Electron and/or ion transfer ===
There is debate about whether electrons or ions are transferred in triboelectricity. For instance, Harper discusses both possibilities, whereas Vick was more in favor of electron transfer. The debate remains to this day with, for instance, George M. Whitesides advocating for ions, while Diaz and Fenzel-Alexander as well as Laurence D. Marks support both, and others just electrons.

=== Thermodynamic irreversibility ===
In the latter half of the 20th century the Soviet school led by chemist Boris Derjaguin argued that triboelectricity and the associated phenomenon of triboluminescence are fundamentally irreversible. A similar point of view to Derjaguin's has been more recently advocated by Seth Putterman and his collaborators at the University of California, Los Angeles (UCLA).

A proposed theory of triboelectricity as a fundamentally irreversible process was published in 2020 by theoretical physicists Robert Alicki and Alejandro Jenkins. They argued that the electrons in the two materials that slide against each other have different velocities, giving a non-equilibrium state. Quantum effects cause this imbalance to pump electrons from one material to the other. This is a fermionic analog of the mechanism of rotational superradiance originally described by Yakov Zeldovich for bosons. Electrons are pumped in both directions, but small differences in the electronic potential landscapes for the two surfaces can cause net charging. Alicki and Jenkins argue that such an irreversible pumping is needed to understand how the triboelectric effect can generate an electromotive force.

=== Humidity ===
Generally, increased humidity (water in the air) leads to a decrease in the magnitude of triboelectric charging. The size of this effect varies greatly depending on the contacting materials; the decrease in charging ranges from up to a factor of 10 or more to very little humidity dependence. Some experiments find increased charging at moderate humidity compared to extremely dry conditions before a subsequent decrease at higher humidity. The most widespread explanation is that higher humidity leads to more water adsorbed at the surface of contacting materials, leading to a higher surface conductivity. The higher conductivity allows for greater charge recombination as contacts separate, resulting in a smaller transfer of charge. Another proposed explanation for humidity effects considers the case when charge transfer is observed to increase with humidity in dry conditions. Increasing humidity may lead to the formation of water bridges between contacting materials that promote the transfer of ions.

== Examples ==
=== Friction and adhesion from tribocharging ===
Friction is a retarding force due to different energy dissipation process such as elastic and plastic deformation, phonon and electron excitation, and also adhesion. As an example, in a car or any other vehicle the wheels elastically deform as they roll. Part of the energy needed for this deformation is recovered (elastic deformation), some is not and goes into heating the tires. The energy which is not recovered contributes to the back force, a process called rolling friction.

Similar to rolling friction there are energy terms in charge transfer, which contribute to friction. In static friction there is coupling between elastic strains, polarization and surface charge which contributes to the frictional force. In sliding friction, when asperities contact and there is charge transfer, some of the charge returns as the contacts are released, some does not and will contribute to the macroscopically observed friction. There is evidence for a retarding Coulomb force between asperities of different charges, and an increase in the adhesion from contact electrification when geckos walk on water. There is also evidence of connections between jerky (stick–slip) processes during sliding with charge transfer, electrical discharge and x-ray emission. How large the triboelectric contribution is to friction has been debated. It has been suggested by some that it may dominate for polymers, whereas Harper has argued that it is small.

=== Liquids and gases ===
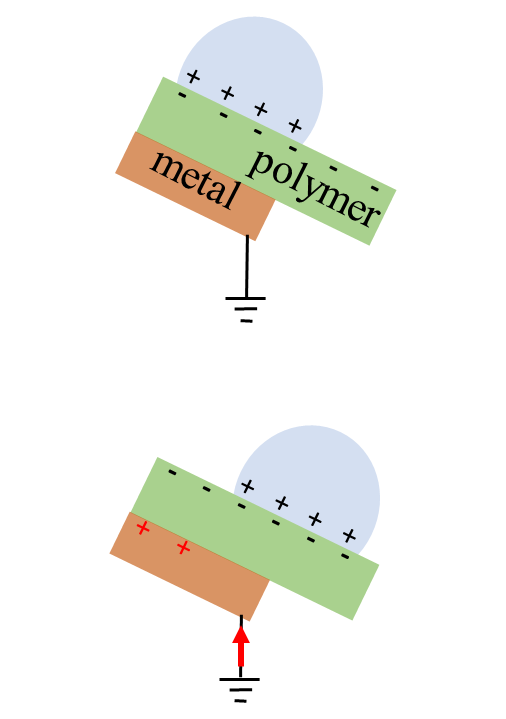
Illustration of tribocharge generated from a sliding drop

The generation of static electricity from the relative motion of liquids or gases is well established, with one of the first analyses in 1886 by Lord Kelvin in his water dropper which used falling drops to create an electric generator. Liquid mercury is a special case as it typically acts as a simple metal, so has been used as a reference electrode. More common is water, and electricity due to water droplets hitting surfaces has been documented since the discovery by Philipp Lenard in 1892 of the spray electrification or waterfall effect. This is when falling water generates static electricity either by collisions between water drops or with the ground, leading to the finer mist in updrafts being mainly negatively charged, with positive near the lower surface. It can also occur for sliding drops.

Another type of charge can be produced during rapid solidification of water containing ions, which is called the Workman–Reynolds effect. During the solidification the positive and negative ions may not be equally distributed between the liquid and solid. For instance, in thunderstorms this can contribute (together with the waterfall effect) to separation of positive hydrogen ions and negative hydroxide ions, leading to static charge and lightning.

A third class is associated with contact potential differences between liquids or gases and other materials, similar to the work function differences for solids. It has been suggested that a triboelectric series for liquids is useful. One difference from solids is that often liquids have charged double layers, and most of the work to date supports that ion transfer (rather than electron) dominates for liquids as first suggested by Irving Langmuir in 1938.

Finally, with liquids there can be flow-rate gradients at interfaces, and also viscosity gradients. These can produce electric fields and also polarization of the liquid, a field called electrohydrodynamics. These are analogous to the electromechanical terms for solids where electric fields can occur due to elastic strains as described earlier.

=== Powders ===
During commercial powder processing or in natural processes such as dust storms, triboelectric charge transfer can occur. There can be electric fields of up to 160kV/m with moderate wind conditions, which leads to Coulomb forces of about the same magnitude as gravity. There does not need to be air present, significant charging can occur, for instance, on airless planetary bodies. With pharmaceutic powders and other commercial powders the tribocharging needs to be controlled for quality control of the materials and doses. Static discharge is also a particular hazard in grain elevators owing to the danger of a dust explosion, in places that store explosive powders, and in many other cases. Triboelectric powder separation has been discussed as a method of separating powders, for instance different biopolymers. The principle here is that different degrees of charging can be exploited for electrostatic separation, a general concept for powders.

=== In industry ===
Static electricity hazard sign (ISO 7010)

There are many areas in industry where triboelectricity is known to be an issue. some examples are:

- Non-conducting pipes carrying combustible liquids or fuels such as petrol can result in tribocharge accumulation on the walls of the pipes, which can lead to potentials as large as 90 kV. Pneumatic transport systems in industry can lead to fires due to the tribocharge generated during use.
- On ships, contact between cargo and pipelines during loading and unloading, as well as flow in steam pipes and water jets in cleaning machines can lead to dangerous charging. Courses exist to teach mariners the dangers.
- US authorities require nearly all industrial facilities to measure particulate dust emissions. Various sensors based on triboelectricity are used, and in 1997 the United States Environmental Protection Agency issued guidelines for triboelectric fabric-filter bag leak-detection systems. Commercial sensors are available for triboelectric dust detection.
- Wiping a rail near a chemical tank while it is being filled with a flammable chemical can lead to sparks which ignite the chemical. This was the cause of a 2017 explosion that killed one and injured many.

=== Other examples ===
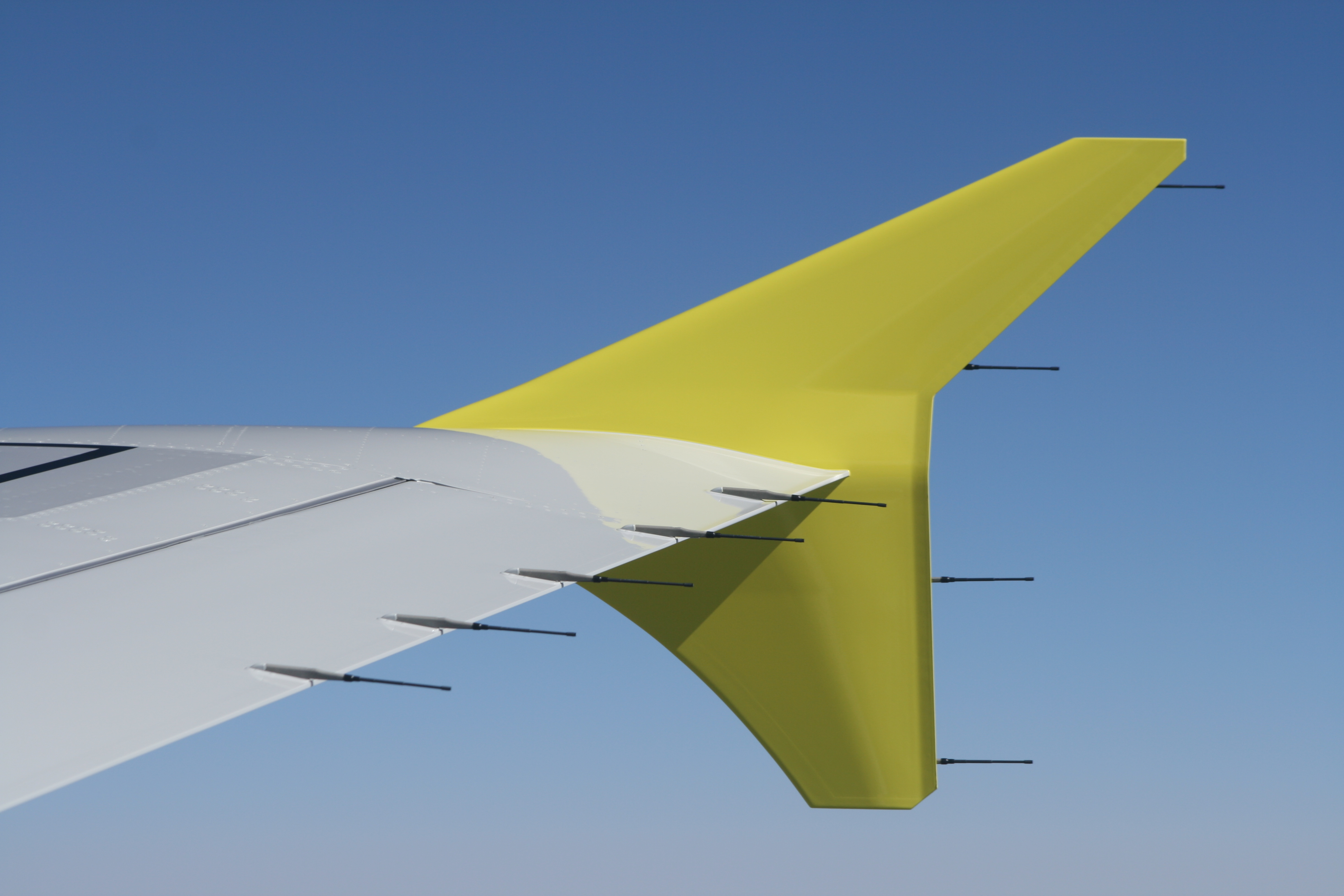
Static wicks on a Winglet Airbus A319-132

While the simple case of stroking a cat is familiar to many, there are other areas in modern technological civilization where triboelectricity is exploited or is a concern:

- Air moving past an aircraft can lead to a buildup of charge called "precipitation static" or "P-static"; aircraft typically have one or more static wicks to remove it. Checking the status of these is a standard task for pilots. Similarly, helicopter blades move fast, and tribocharging can generate voltages up to 200 kV.
- During planetary formation, a key step is aggregation of dust or smaller particles. There is evidence that triboelectric charging during collisions of granular material plays a key role in overcoming barriers to aggregation.
- Single-use medical protective clothing must fulfill certain triboelectric charging regulations in China.
- Space vehicles can accumulate significant tribocharge which can interfere with communications such as the sending of self-destruct signals. Some launches have been delayed by weather conditions where tribocharging could occur.
- Triboelectric nanogenerators are energy harvesting devices which convert mechanical energy into electricity.
- Triboelectric noise within medical cable assemblies and lead wires is generated when the conductors, insulation, and fillers rub against each other as the cables are flexed during movement. Keeping triboelectric noise at acceptable levels requires careful material selection, design, and processing. It is also an issue with underwater electroacoustic transducers if there are flexing motions of the cables; the mechanism is believed to involve relative motion between a dielectric and a conductor in the cable.

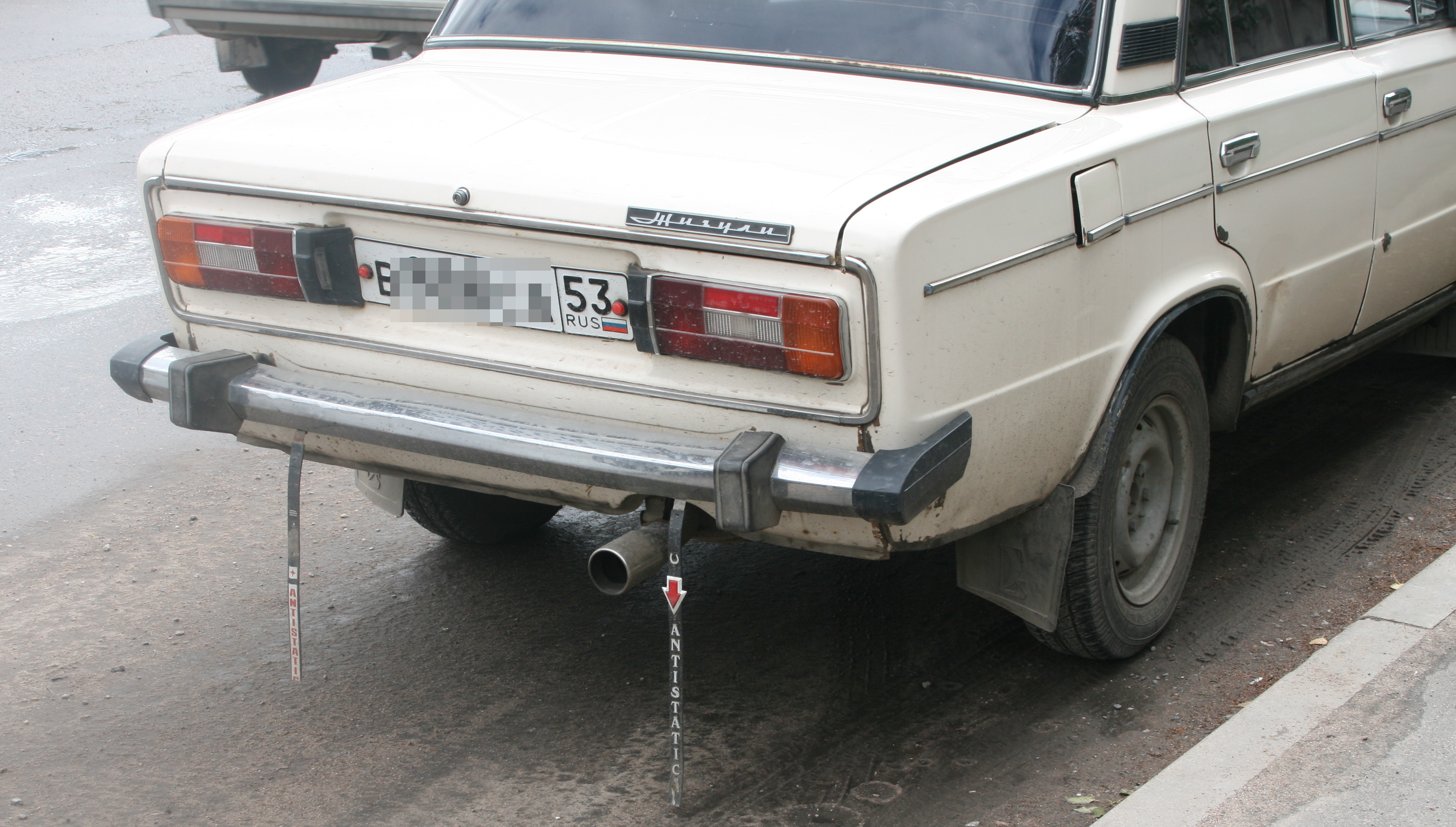
Antistatic belts on a car in Russia in 2014

- The carbon black added to vehicle tires helps to conduct away tribocharge that could shock passengers when they exit. There are also discharging straps that can be purchased.

== See also ==
- Electrostatic generator, machine to produce static electricity
- Electrostatic induction, separation of charges and polarization due to other charges
- Electrostriction, coupling between an electric field and volume of unit cells
- Electrohydrodynamics, coupling in liquids between electric fields and properties
- Flexoelectricity, polarization due to bending and other strain gradients
- Mechanoluminescence, light produced by mechanical action, often involving triboelectric effect
- Nanotribology, science of tribology (friction, lubrication and wear processes) at the nanoscale
- Piezoelectricity, polarization due to linear strains
- Polarization density, general description of the physics of polarization
- Static electricity, electric charge often but not always due to triboelectricity
- Tribology, science of friction, lubrication and wear
- Triboluminescence, light associated with sliding or contacts
- Work function, the energy to remove an electron from a surface
