= Flexoelectricity =

Polarization due to a strain gradient

Flexoelectricity is a property of a dielectric material where there is coupling between electrical polarization and a strain gradient. This phenomenon is closely related to piezoelectricity, but while piezoelectricity refers to polarization due to uniform strain, flexoelectricity specifically involves polarization due to strain that varies from point to point in the material. This nonuniform strain breaks centrosymmetry, meaning that unlike in piezoelectricity, flexoelectric effects occur in both centrosymmetric and asymmetric crystal structures. This property is not the same as ferroelasticity. It plays a critical role in explaining many interesting electromechanical behaviors in hard crystalline materials and core mechanoelectric transduction phenomena in soft biomaterials. Additionally, it is a size-dependent effect that becomes more significant in nanoscale systems, such as crack tips. Unlike piezoelectricity which only occurs in materials without inversion symmetry, flexoelectricity occurs in all dielectrics.

In common usage, flexoelectricity is the generation of polarization due to a strain gradient; inverse flexoelectricity is when polarization, often due to an applied electric field, generates a strain gradient. Converse flexoelectricity is where a polarization gradient induces strain in a material.

The electric polarization $P_i$ due to a mechanical strain of $\epsilon_{ij}$ in a dielectric is given by:

$$P_i = e_{ijk}\epsilon_{jk} + \mu_{ijkl}\frac{\partial\epsilon_{jk}}{\partial x_l}$$

where the first term corresponds to the direct piezoelectric effect and the second term corresponds to the flexoelectric polarization induced by the strain gradient. The flexoelectric coefficient, $\mu_{ijkl}$, is a fourth-rank polar tensor and $e_{ijk}$ is the coefficient corresponding to the direct piezoelectric effect.

== See also ==
- Piezoelectricity
- Ferroelectricity
- Ferroelasticity
- Triboelectric effect
