= W. R. Pidgeon =

W. R. Pidgeon developed the pidgeon machine, an electrostatic machine with a unique setup.

== Biography ==
Pidgeon presented his machine to the Physical Society after several years of investigation into influence machines (in the 1890s). The device was later reported in the Philosophical Magazine (December 1898, pg. 564) and the Electrical Review (Vol. XLV, pg. 748). Pidgeon machines possess fixed inductors arranged in a manner that increases the electrical induction effect (and it electrical output is at least double that of typical machines of this type [except when it is overtaxed]). The essential features of the Pidgeon machine are, one, the combination of the rotating support and the fixed support for inducing charge, and, two, the improved insulation of all parts of the machine (but more especially of the generator's carriers). Pidgeon machines are a combination of a Wimshurst machine and Voss machine, with special features adapted to reduce the amount of charge leakage. Pidgeon machines excite themselves more readily than the best of these types of machines. In addition, Pidgeon investigated higher current "triplex" section machines (or "double machines with a single central disk") with enclosed sectors (and would receive British Patent 22517 (1899) for this type of machine).

== External articles ==
- The Electrical Engineer. (1884). London: Biggs & Co. Page 19
- Machine design, lineone.net/~aarekhu.
