= Wilhelm Holtz =

German physicist (1836–1913)

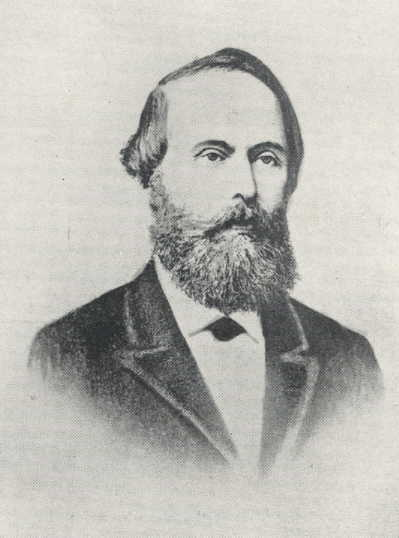
Wilhelm Holtz

Wilhelm Holtz (15 October 1836 – 27 September 1913) was a German physicist who was a native of Saatel bei Barth, Mecklenburg.

Between 1857 and 1862, he studied physics and natural sciences in Berlin, Dijon and Edinburgh. Afterwards, he performed experiments with electricity in Berlin, and later became associated with research at the universities of Halle and Greifswald, where in 1884 he became a professor of physics.

In 1865 Holtz invented the "Holtz electrostatic influence machine", an electrostatic induction generator that converted mechanical work into electrostatic energy, needing only an initial charge to begin operation. In the following years, Holtz made modifications, and in the process, manufactured several more of the devices.

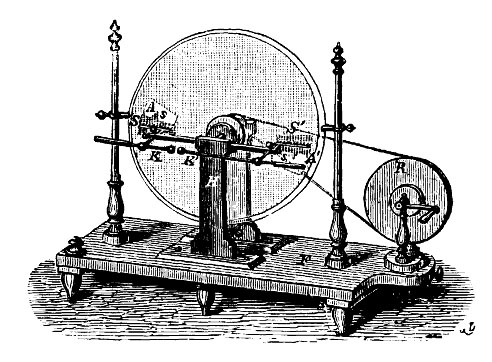
Holtz Influence Machine

Electrostatic generators from this era were sometimes referred to as "Toepler-Holtz machines", being named in conjunction with German physicist August Toepler (1836–1912), who during the same time period, constructed an "influence machine" independent of Holtz, and is often credited as being its initial inventor.

Wilhelm Holtz died in Greifswald in 1913.
