= Kelvin water dropper =

Type of electrostatic generator

The Kelvin water dropper, invented by Scottish scientist William Thomson (Lord Kelvin) in 1867, is a type of electrostatic generator. Kelvin referred to the device as his water-dropping condenser. The apparatus is variously called the Kelvin hydroelectric generator, the Kelvin electrostatic generator, or Lord Kelvin's thunderstorm. The device uses falling water to generate voltage differences by electrostatic induction occurring between interconnected, oppositely charged systems. This eventually leads to an electric arc discharging in the form of a spark. It is used in physics education to demonstrate the principles of electrostatics.

Fig. 1: Schematic setup for the Kelvin water dropper.

== Description ==
A typical setup is shown in Fig. 1. A reservoir of water or other conducting liquid (top, grey) is connected to two hoses that release two falling streams of drops, which land in two buckets or containers (bottom, blue and red). Each stream passes (without touching) through a metal ring or open cylinder which is electrically connected to the opposite receiving container; the left ring (red) is connected to the right bucket, while the right ring (blue) is connected to the left bucket. The containers must be electrically insulated from each other and from electrical ground. Similarly, the rings must be electrically isolated from each other and their environment. The streams must break into separate droplets before reaching the containers. Typically, the containers are made of metal and the rings are connected to them by wires.

The simple construction makes this device popular in physics education as a laboratory experiment for students.

== Principles of operation ==
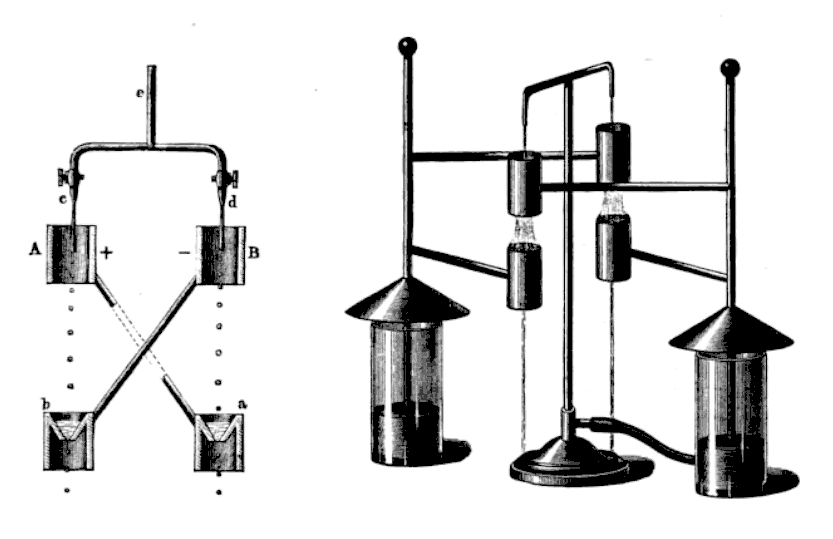
A 1918 version of the machine.

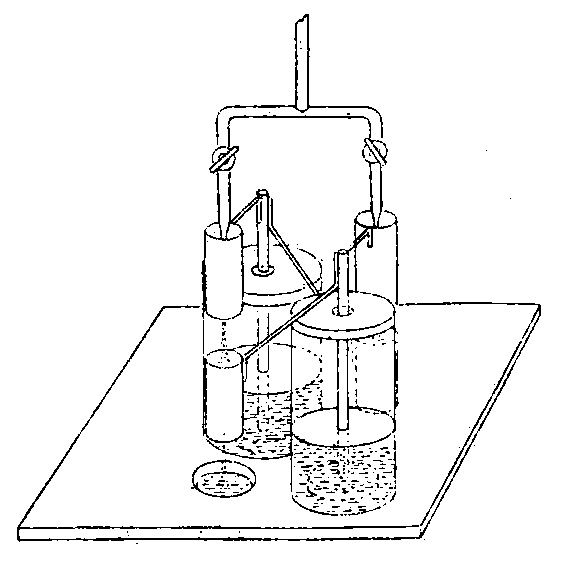
Kelvin's original 1867 drawing.

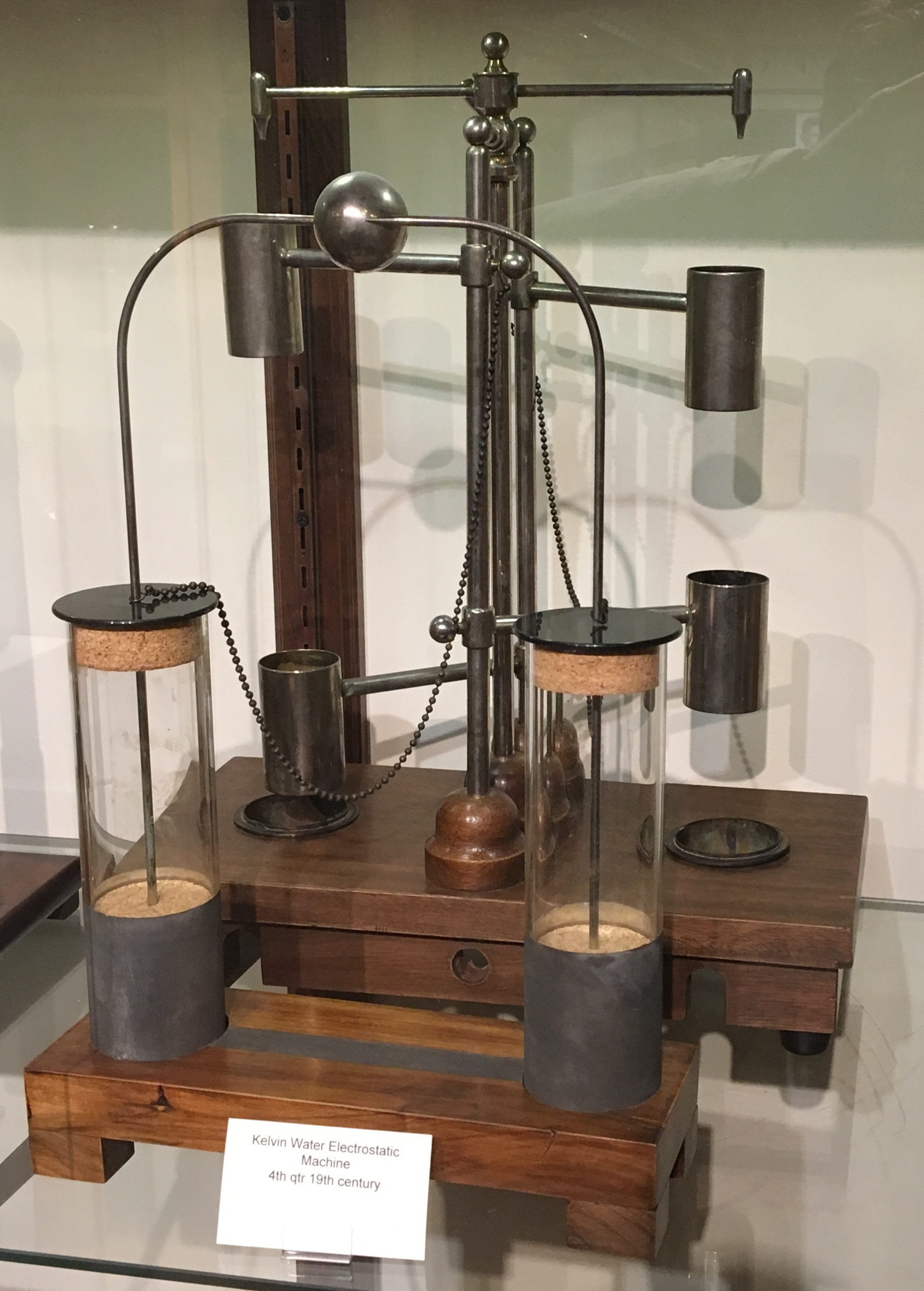
Replica of machine sold for educational use.

In Kelvin's original machine, instead of buckets, after falling through the charging electrodes the drops fall into metal funnels which collect the charge but let the water through. The charge is stored in two Leyden jar capacitors (large cylindrical objects)

A small initial difference in electric charge between the two buckets, which always exists because the buckets are insulated from each other, is necessary to begin the charging process. Suppose, therefore, that the right bucket has a small positive charge. Now the left ring also has some positive charge because it is connected to the bucket. The charge on the left ring will attract negative charges in the water (ions) into the left-hand stream by the Coulomb electrostatic attraction. When a drop breaks off the end of the left-hand stream, the drop carries a negative charge with it. When the negatively charged water drop falls into its bucket (the left one), it gives that bucket and the attached ring (the right one) a negative charge.

Once the right ring has a negative charge, it similarly attracts positive charge into the right-hand stream. When drops break off the end of that stream, they carry positive charge to the positively charged bucket, making that bucket even more positively charged.

Thus positive charges are attracted to the right-hand stream by the ring, and positive charge drips into the positively charged right bucket. Negative charges are attracted to the left-hand stream and negative charge drips into the negatively charged left bucket. This process of charge separation that occurs in the water is called electrostatic induction. The higher the charge that accumulates in each bucket, the higher the electrical potential on the rings and the more effective this process of electrostatic induction is. During the induction process, there is an electric current that flows in the form of positive or negative ions in the water of the supply lines. This is separate from the bulk flow of water that falls through the rings and breaks into droplets on the way to the containers. For example, as water approaches the negatively charged ring on the right, any free electrons in the water can easily flee toward the left, against the flow of water.

Eventually, when both buckets have become highly charged, several different effects may be seen. An electric spark may briefly arc between the two buckets or rings, decreasing the charge on each bucket. If there is a steady stream of water through the rings, and if the streams are not perfectly centered in the rings, one can observe the deflection of the streams prior to each spark due to the electrostatic attraction via Coulomb's law of opposite charges. As charging increases, a smooth and steady stream may fan out due to self-repulsion of the net charges in the stream. If the water flow is set such that it breaks into droplets in the vicinity of the rings, the drops may be attracted to the rings enough to touch the rings and deposit their charge on the oppositely charged rings, which decreases the charge on that side of the system. In that case also, the buckets will start to electrostatically repel the droplets falling towards them, and may fling the droplets away from the buckets. Each of these effects will limit the voltage that can be reached by the device. The voltages reached by this device can be in the range of kilovolts, but the amounts of charge are small, so there is no more danger to persons than that of static electrical discharges produced by shuffling feet on a carpet, for example.

The opposite charges which build up on the buckets represent electrical potential energy, as shown by the energy released as light and heat when a spark passes between them. This energy comes from the gravitational potential energy released when the water falls. The charged falling water drops do work against the opposing electric field of the like-charged containers, which exerts an upward force against them, converting gravitational potential energy into electrical potential energy, plus motional kinetic energy. The kinetic energy is wasted as heat when the water drops land in the buckets, so when considered as an electric power generator the Kelvin machine is very inefficient. However, the principle of operation is the same as with other forms of hydroelectric power. As always, energy is conserved.

== Details ==
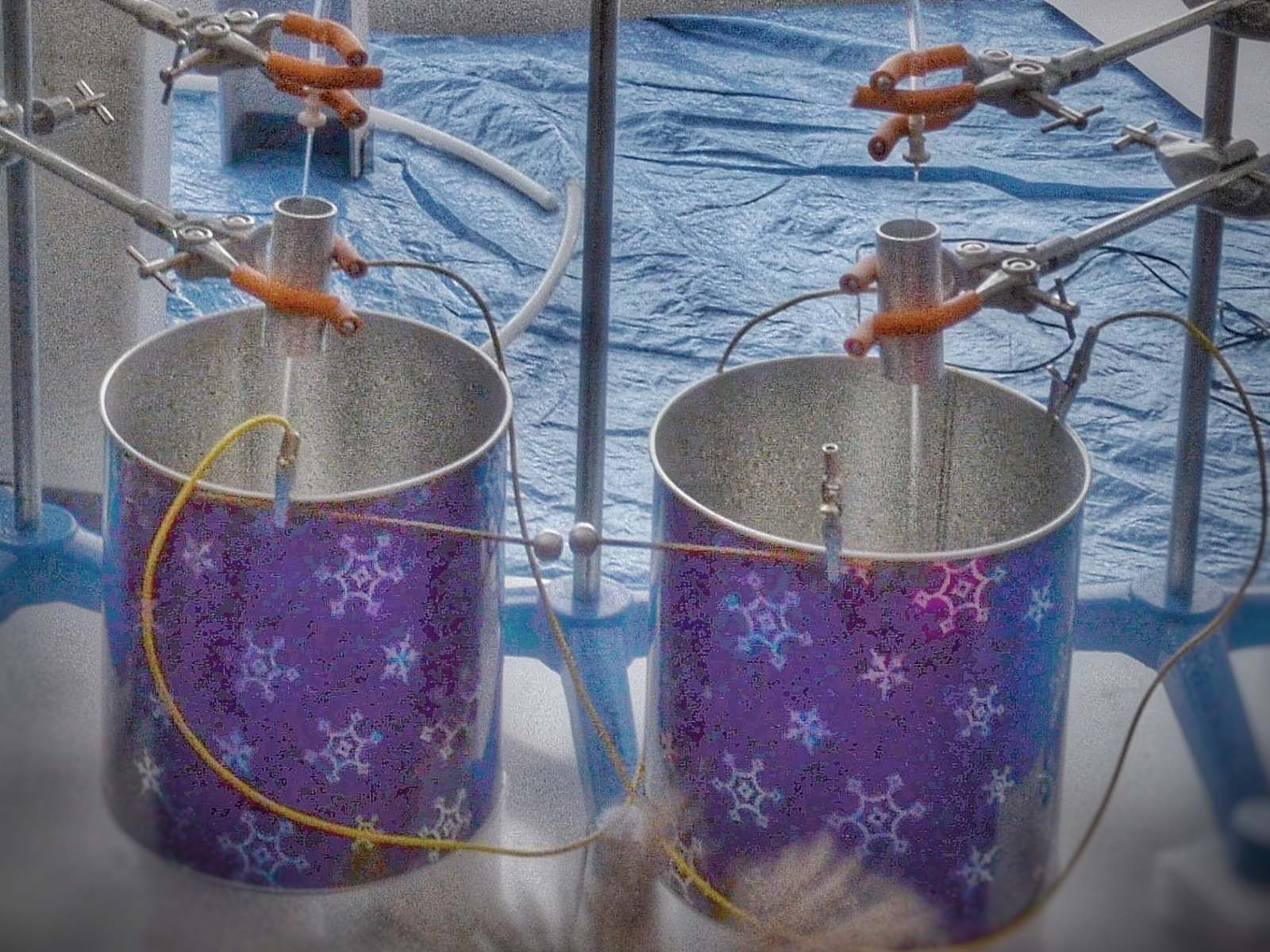
Fig. 3: A Kelvin water dropper set up at the 2014 Cambridge Science Festival

If the buckets are metal conductors, then the built-up charge resides on the outside of the metal, not in the water. This is part of the electrical induction process, and is an example of the related "Faraday's ice bucket". Also, the idea of bringing small amounts of charge into the center of a large metal object with a large net charge, as happens in Kelvin's water dropper, relies on the same physics as in the operation of a van de Graaff generator.

The discussion above is in terms of charged droplets falling. The inductive charging effects occur while the water stream is continuous. This is because the flow and separation of charge occurs already when the streams of water approach the rings, so that when the water passes through the rings there is already net charge on the water. When drops form, some net charge is trapped on each drop as gravity pulls it toward the like-charged container.

When the containers are metal, the wires may be attached to the metal. Otherwise, the container-end of each wire must dip into the water. In the latter case, the charge resides on the surface of the water, not outside of the containers.

The apparatus can be extended to more than two streams of droplets.

In 2013, a combined group from the University of Twente (the Netherlands) constructed a microfluidic version of the Kelvin water dropper, which yields electrical voltages able to charge, deform and break water droplets of micrometric size by just using pneumatic force instead of gravity. A year later, they developed another version of a microfluidic Kelvin water dropper, using a microscale liquid jet (which then broke into microdroplets) shot onto a metal target, which yielded a maximum 48% efficiency.

== Historical background ==
In De Magnete, published in 1600, William Gilbert included studies of static electricity produced by amber and its interaction with water. He observed the formation of conical structures on water which are commonly now called Taylor cones.

Other early studies noting the interaction of static electricity with water and reported in the English language include:

- Francis Hauksbee "Physico-Mechanical Experiments on Various Subjects". (1719)
- William Watson, "Experiments and Observations Tending To Illustrate The Nature and Properties of Electricity". (MDCCXLVI) (1741)
- John Theophilus Desaguliers, "A Dissertation concerning Electricity" Innys and Longman, London MDCCXLII (1742)
- Joseph Priestley, "The History and Present State Of Electricity with Original Experiments by, Volumes I, II, and III (MDCCLXVII) (1747)
- James Ferguson, "An Introduction to Electricity", W. Strahan and T. Cadell, London MDCCLXX (1770)
- George Adams, "An Essay on Electricity", London (1785)
- Tiberius Cavallo, "A Complete Treatise On Electricity in Theory and Practice with Original Experiments", Volumes I and II (MDCCXCV) (1795)
- John Cuthbertson, "Practical Electricity", J. Callow, London (1807)
- George John Singer, "Elements of Electricity and Electro-chemistry", Longman, Hurst, Rees, Orme, and Brown, Paternoster Row 1814
- George W. Francis, "Electrostatic Experiments" (1844)
- Henry Minchin Noad, "A Manual of Electricity" in two volumes (1857)

By the 1840s it was able to be demonstrated that streams of water could carry electric charge, that streams carrying like charge were repelled and that streams carrying unlike charge were attracted. It could also be demonstrated that physical charge separation, that is, separation of charge into different regions, could be induced in a body of water by a static electric field.

Lord Kelvin used this foundation of accumulated knowledge to, in 1859, create an apparatus involving the interaction of a stream of water with the Earth's static electric field to cause charge separation and subsequent measurement of charge to make atmospheric electricity measurements.

== Experimental studies ==
Investigations of the Kelvin electrostatic generator under various controlled conditions showed that it operated with tap water, distilled water (non-deionised) and a saturated solution of NaCl. It was also found that the generator worked well even if the two liquid streams originate from different electrically insulated reservoirs. A model was proposed in which the electric charge results from the separation of the positive aqueous hydrogen ion and the negative aqueous hydroxyl ion as the water droplets form.
