= The Cyprus Institute =

Non-profit research and educational institution

- CyI Logo
- Type: Private
- Established: 2005
- President: Stavros Malas
- Faculty: 100
- Location: Nicosia, Cyprus
- Campus: Athalassa campus
- Website: www.cyi.ac.cy

The Cyprus Institute is an educational institution with a scientific and technological orientation. It was formally established in 2005, and started operations in 2007.

The institute is supported by the Cyprus Research and Educational Foundation (CREF). It is currently chaired by Didier Roux, a French physicochemist, Director of research and innovation at Saint-Gobain, and a member of the French Academy of sciences and the Academy of Technology.

The Cyprus Institute has five active Research Centers:

- The Energy, Environment and Water Research Center (EEWRC), developed in partnership with the Massachusetts Institute of Technology.
- The Science and Technology in Archaeology Research Center (STARC) in partnership with the Centre for Research and Restoration of Museums of France, headquartered in the Louvre.
- The Computation-based Science and Technology Research Center (CaSToRC) in partnership with the University of Illinois.
- The Science and Technology Driven Policy and Innovation Research Center (STeDI-RC).
- The Climate and Atmosphere Research Center (CARE-C).

Having launched its first Center in 2007, The Cyprus Institute has secured several research projects, including a Starting and an Advanced Grant from the European Research Council (ERC), three European Research Area Chairs (ERA Chairs), and three Marie Skłodowska-Curie European Joint Doctorates (EJD).

The Cyprus Institute is also an accredited, degree-granting institution of higher education, offering Master's and PhD programs.

== Planning Phase ==
The planning for the establishment of the Cyprus Institute took place from 2000 to 2004 under the aegis of the Cyprus Development Bank led by J. Ioannides and A. Mouskos. Aided by A. Stamatis, the CEO of the Bank of Cyprus Oncology Center worked with a team of scholars, where they undertook the coordination, research, and planning of the institute.

The team of academics consisted of:

- Ernest J. Moniz of the Massachusetts Institute of Technology, who has served as Secretary of the US Department of Energy and as associate director of the White House Office of Science and Technology Policy;
- Guy Ourisson of Louis Pasteur University, who served as president of the French Academy of Sciences and was the founding president of the Louis Pasteur University in Strasbourg;
- Costas N. Papanicolas of the University of Athens, chairman at the time of the Council of Educational Evaluation-Accreditation (CEEA);
- Frank H.T. Rhodes who has served as president of Cornell University;
- Herwig Schopper, who has served as general director of the European Organization for Nuclear Research (CERN) and as chair of the Scientific Council of the SESAME.

The planning phase was led by Costas N. Papanicolas, CEO of CREF. The vision of the institute and its staged development spanning a ten-year period was presented, debated, and endorsed by a convocation of international scholars held in Nicosia in June 2002. The convocation was chaired by Hubert Curien, former minister of research of France, who accepted the founding chairmanship of the CREF Board. Following endorsement by the international community, a plan for launching the institute was drafted, which was accepted and supported by the Cyprus Development Bank and the Government of Cyprus.

== Institutional Framework ==
The Cyprus Institute is being developed under the institutional umbrella of the Cyprus Research and Educational Foundation (CREF), governed by a board which is international in its composition.

The Board is chaired by Didier Roux , a French physicochemist, Director of research and innovation at Saint-Gobain and a member of the French Academy of sciences and the Academy of Technology, and includes world-renowned academics, all living presidents of the republic, regional and international political, civic and business leaders. The board is advised and aided by an international body of distinguished academics known as the Scientific Advisory Council.

== Research Centers ==
The research organization of the institute comprises cross-disciplinary research centers pursuing issues of scholarly relevance, global significance and regional focus. There are currently five active research centers:

- Energy, Environment and Water Research Center (EEWRC)
- Science and Technology in Archaeology and Culture Research Center (STARC)
- Computation-based Science and Technology Research Center (CaSToRC)
- Science and Technology Driven Policy and Innovation Research Center (STeDI-RC)
- Climate and Atmosphere Research Center (CARE-C)

=== Energy, Environment and Water Research Center (EEWRC) ===
The Energy, Environment and Water Research Center (EEWRC) is the first Research Center of the Cyprus Institute formally launched in December 2007. EEWRC is being developed under the guidance of the Massachusetts Institute of Technology.

EEWRC has adapted its core research agenda around the Water-Energy-Food-Ecosystems (WEFE) Nexus.

=== Science and Technology in Archaeology Research Center (STARC) ===
The Science and Technology in Archaeology Research Center (STARC) is being developed jointly by The Cyprus Institute and the Centre de recherche et de restauration des musées de France, headquartered at the Louvre. STARC was launched in February 2009.

The center focuses on advancing scientific technologies in the fields of Archaeology and Cultural Heritage, particularly in the Mediterranean-Middle East region. Research topics are based on a practical approach to basic research.

=== Computation-based Science and Technology Research Center (CaSToRC) ===
The Computation-based Science and Technology Research Center (CaSToRC) is being developed jointly with the University of Illinois and in particular with its National Center for Supercomputing Applications (NCSA), it was officially launched in February 2009. The center is actively involved in research projects relating to improve the computing infrastructure of the Eastern Mediterranean region. Projects include the coordination of the regional LinkSCEEM project, which aims to establish user communities and ameliorate network connectivity in the region, and the European PRACE initiative, which will create a persistent pan-European High Performance Computing service.

=== Science and Technology Driven Policy and Innovation Research Center (STeDI-RC) ===
STeDI-RC (the Science and Technology Driven Policy and Innovation Research Center) is the fifth Research Center of the Cyprus Institute, which was launched in 2018. This was following a strategic decision taken by the institute's board of trustees and started operations in the academic year 2022–23. Its scope was decided by a Committee comprising faculty members from all Research Centers of the Institute as well as some of the institute's senior management

In line with the institute's mission to conduct pioneering research, innovation, and educational activities. STeDI-RC is a cross-disciplinary endeavor to engage in policy research and innovation addressing today's sustainability challenges.

The center's research in science and technology intends to address sustainability challenges and inform policymaking.

=== Climate and Atmosphere Research Center (CARE-C) ===
CARE-C is a regional European Center of Excellence for Climate and Atmosphere Research, based in Cyprus, for the Eastern Mediterranean and Middle East (EMME) region. CARE-C is focused on addressing urgent climate change and air pollution challenges and impacts in the EMME region. CARE-C intends to blend research, innovation and educational efforts with a regional focus. It was founded at the Cyprus Institute in January 2020 through competitive funding secured from the European Commission and the Cyprus Government. This was in the framework of the European Commission Horizon-2020-TEAMING project "EMME-CARE" (Eastern Mediterranean and Middle East Climate and Atmosphere Research Centre; Grant no. 856612).

The center was established in cooperation with EU Advanced Partners: the Max Planck Institute for Chemistry in Mainz in Germany, the Alternative Energies and Atomic Energy Commission (CEA) in France, and the University of Helsinki (UHEL) in Finland.
