= Accélérateur Grand Louvre d'analyse élémentaire =

Particle accelerator in the Louvre museum

Coordinates: 48.8610°N 2.3316°E

Accélérateur Grand Louvre d'analyse élémentaire (AGLAE) is a particle accelerator housed by the Center for Research and Restoration of Museums of France in the Louvre museum in Paris, France. It is used to study artworks by characterizing even trace elements composing them, and is the only particle accelerator solely dedicated to the study of cultural heritage.

== Details ==
AGLAE is a Pelletron 2MeV electrostatic accelerator built by an American company, the National Electrostatics Corporation, and has two sources:

- a Duoplasmatron+ source that can produce hydrogen ions (protons), and
- an Alpha source that can produce Helium ions (two protons and two neutrons bound together into a particle identical to a helium nucleus). This produces protons with an energy up to 4 MeV and alphas up to 6 MeV.

AGLAE was installed starting in 1987 and inaugurated in 1989. AGLAE is sited some 15m below the glass pyramid at the Louvre.

== Use ==
AGLAE generates protons and Alpha particles that are emitted outside the accelerator itself, enabling items of virtually any size or type to be examined. The particles, and their collision products, are detected to analyse the composition of the cultural items in the path of the particle beams. The techniques used at AGLAE include particle-induced X-ray and gamma-ray emission spectrometries.

The data is used to determine the atomic constituents of the cultural items, including trace elements.

=== Detectors ===
AGLAE implements derived methods of analysis with two ion beams:

- particle induced X-ray emission (PIXE)
- Rutherford backscattering spectrometry (RBS)
- analysis by nuclear reactions (NRA), a variant is called GAUGE (gamma-induced charged particle emission)
- elastic recoil detection analysis (ERDA)
- a spectrometer to record the ionoluminescence on the extracted beam line (IBIL)

=== Upgrade ===
AGLAE particle analysis techniques are limited in that they are not very effective for studying paintings because of a slight risk of damage. An upgrade (NEW AGLAE, using an ANR-10-EQPX-22) in progress in 2015 aims to produce a lower-power beam that will allow more sensitive detectors to overcome this issue, and allow 24-hour operation of the facility.

== Directors ==
Dr Claire Pacheco - 2011-current
