= Van de Graaff generator =

Electrostatic generator operating on the triboelectric effect

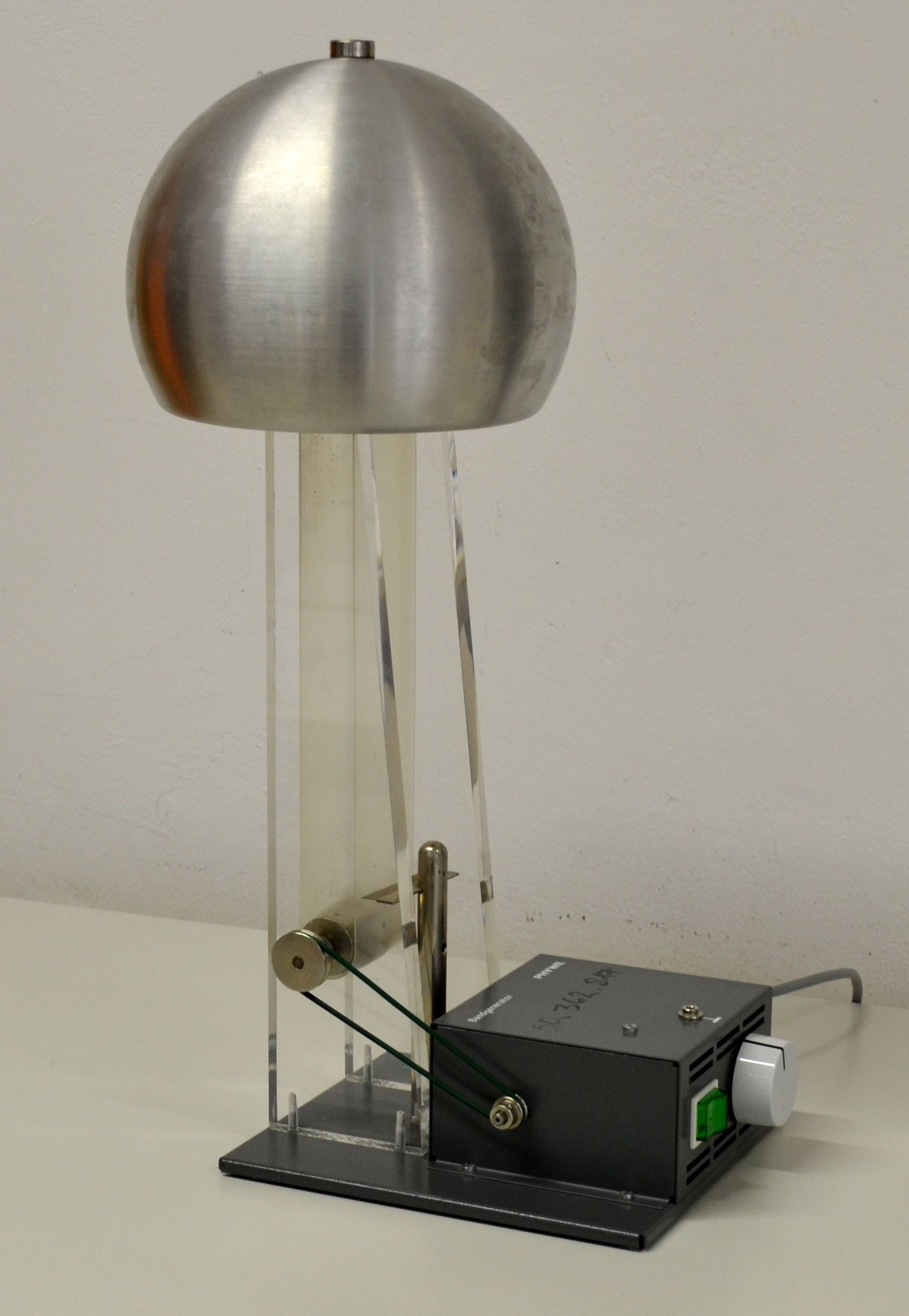
- Small Van de Graaff generator for science education
- Uses: Accelerating electrons to sterilize food and process materials, accelerating protons for nuclear physics experiments, producing energetic X-ray beams in nuclear medicine, physics education, entertainment
- Inventor: Robert J. Van de Graaff
- Related items: linear particle accelerator

A Van de Graaff generator is an electrostatic generator which uses a moving belt to accumulate electric charge on an insulated, hollow metal terminal, creating electric potential. Because it moves charge mechanically, it supplies high voltage direct current at very low current.

American physicist Robert J. Van de Graaff invented the generator in 1929 and first demonstrated it in 1931. He conceived of the generator as a power source for particle accelerators, as high potentials can be used to accelerate subatomic particles to high energies in an evacuated accelerator tube. Beginning with Van de Graaff’s Round Hill machine in 1933, Van de Graaff accelerators were widely used in nuclear science research through the 1970s. Several high-energy Van de Graaff accelerators remain in scientific use and have inspired related electrostatic accelerator designs. Lower-energy Van de Graaff generators have been used to generate energetic particle beams for nuclear science, nuclear medicine, and ion implantation.

In open air, Van de Graaff generators can reach a potential difference of as much as 5 megavolts (MV); generators enclosed in pressurized tanks reach potentials of 25 MV. An inexpensive tabletop version can produce on the order of 100 kV, enough energy to discharge visible electric sparks. Because they are simple to build and produce only microamperes of current, small Van de Graaff generators are used for science demonstrations and personal entertainment; larger demonstration models are displayed in some science museums.

== History ==
=== Background ===
The concept of an electrostatic generator in which charge is mechanically transported in small amounts into the interior of a high-voltage electrode originated with the Kelvin water dropper, invented in 1867 by William Thomson (Lord Kelvin), in which charged drops of water fall into a bucket with the same polarity charge, adding to the charge. In a machine of this type, the gravitational force moves the drops against the opposing electrostatic field of the bucket. Kelvin himself first suggested using a belt to carry the charge instead of water. The first electrostatic machine that used an endless belt to transport charge was constructed in 1872 by Augusto Righi. It used an india rubber belt with wire rings along its length as charge carriers, which passed into a spherical metal electrode. The charge was applied to the belt from the grounded lower roller by electrostatic induction using a charged plate. John Gray also invented a belt machine about 1890. Another more complicated belt machine was invented in 1903 by Juan Burboa. A more immediate inspiration for Van de Graaff was a generator W. F. G. Swann was developing in the 1920s in which charge was transported to an electrode by falling metal balls, thus returning to the principle of the Kelvin water dropper.

=== Initial development ===
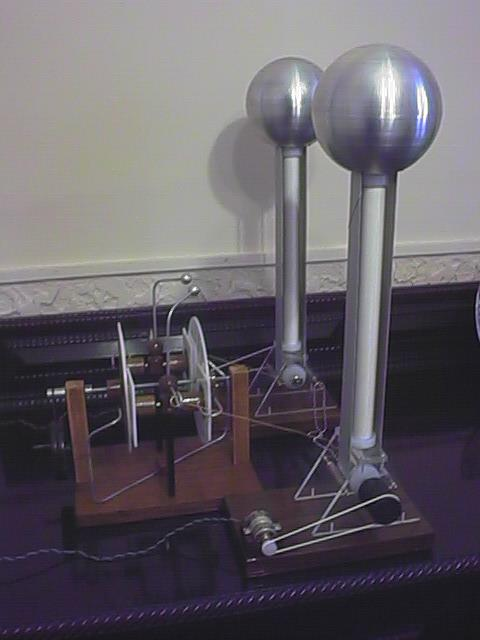
200 kV replica of the 1929 Van de Graaff machine

Robert Jemison Van de Graaff came to the generator because of his desire to study "individual particles." After graduating from the University of Alabama in 1922 with a degree in mechanical engineering, he grew dissatisfied with thermodynamics and its statistical treatment of particles. At the Sorbonne in 1924, he attended Marie Curie's lectures on radioactivity and witnessed Louis de Broglie's doctoral defense presenting wave-particle duality, an experience he later described as turning him toward nuclear physics. As a Rhodes Scholar at Oxford from 1925 to 1928, he read Ernest Rutherford's 1927 Royal Society address calling for artificial particle beams that would transcend natural radioactive sources in energy, and began considering how charge might be transported mechanically into a high-voltage terminal.

At Princeton in 1929, Van de Graaff built his first model from a tin can, a silk ribbon, and a small motor. It achieved 80,000 volts. By September 1931, a twin-sphere machine he constructed for roughly $100 reached 1.5 million volts, double any previous direct-current source. The demonstration attracted broad media coverage and the attention of other physicists. That month, Merle Tuve of the Carnegie Institution borrowed the apparatus, strapping it to his automobile for the drive to Washington DC. Fitted with an acceleration tube, the Carnegie machine enabled the first Van de Graaff nuclear physics experiments by late 1932.

Van de Graaff went to MIT in 1931 and, with funding from the Research Corporation and an airship hanger donated by Edward H. R. Green, constructed a far larger generator. Built at Green's Round Hill estate it featured two 4.6-meter aluminum spheres on 6.7-meter columns and achieved 5.1 million volts differential. Operating in open air meant contending with what the team called the "pigeon effect," arcing caused by accumulated droppings on the spheres. Van de Graaff applied for a second patent in December 1931, which was assigned to Research Corporation.

Meanwhile, Raymond Herb at the University of Wisconsin pursued an alternative approach: enclosed, pressurized machines. His 1934 accelerator reached 1 million volts in a compact tank using air mixed with carbon tetrachloride vapor. This pressure-insulation method, rather than sheer scale, would define subsequent development.

=== Higher energy machines ===
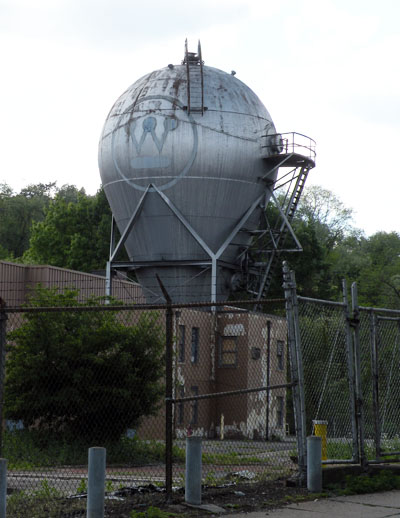
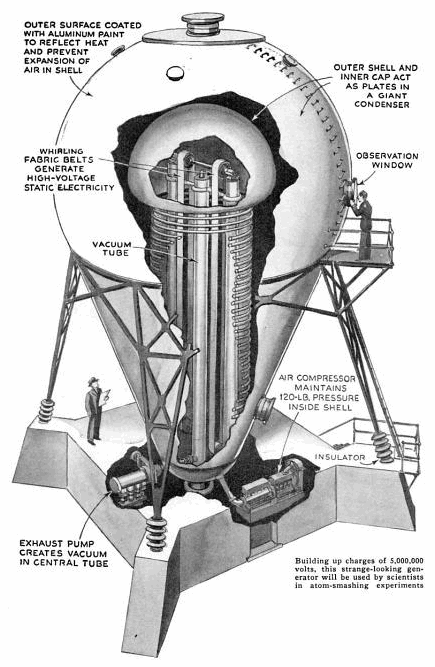
The Westinghouse Atom Smasher, the 5 MeV Van de Graaff generator built in 1937 by the Westinghouse Electric company in Forest Hills, Pennsylvania

In 1937, the Westinghouse Electric company built a 65 ft (20 m) machine, the Westinghouse Atom Smasher capable of generating 5 MeV in Forest Hills, Pennsylvania. It marked the beginning of nuclear research for civilian applications. It was decommissioned in 1958 and was partially demolished in 2015. (The enclosure was laid on its side for safety reasons.)

The tandem Van de Graaff accelerator first appeared in the mid-1950s, containing one or more Van de Graaff generators, in which negatively charged ions are accelerated through one potential difference before being stripped of two or more electrons, inside a high-voltage terminal, and accelerated again. An example of a three-stage operation has been built in Oxford Nuclear Laboratory in 1964 of a 10 MV single-ended "injector" and a 6 MV EN tandem.

By the 1970s, as much as 14 MV could be achieved at the terminal of a tandem that used a tank of high-pressure sulfur hexafluoride (SF_{6}) gas to prevent sparking by trapping electrons. This allowed the generation of heavy ion beams of several tens of MeV, sufficient to study light-ion direct nuclear reactions. The greatest potential sustained by a Van de Graaff accelerator is 25.5 MV, achieved by the tandem in the Holifield Radioactive Ion Beam Facility in Oak Ridge National Laboratory.

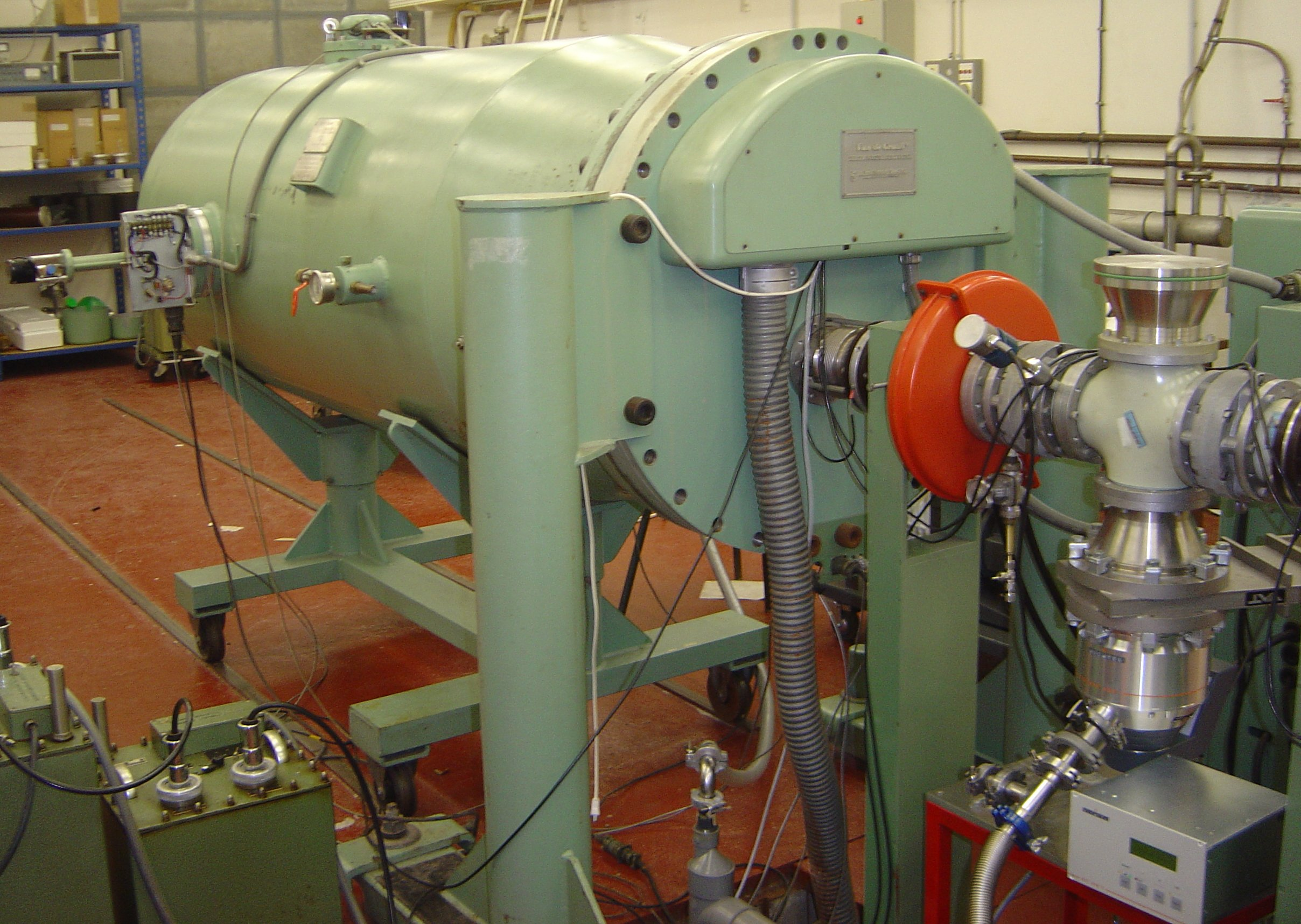
A Van de Graaff particle accelerator in a pressurized tank at Pierre and Marie Curie University, Paris

In the late 1960s, the National Electrostatics Corporation introduced the pelletron, in which the rotating belt is replaced by a chain of short conductive rods connected by insulating links, and the air-ionizing electrodes are replaced by a grounded roller and inductive charging electrode. The chain can be operated at a much greater velocity than a belt, and both the voltage and currents attainable are greater than with a conventional Van de Graaff generator. The 14 UD Heavy Ion Accelerator at the Australian National University houses a 15 MV pelletron. Its chains are more than 20 m long and can travel faster than 50 km/h (31 mph).

The Nuclear Structure Facility (NSF) at Daresbury Laboratory (UK) was proposed in the 1970s, commissioned in 1981, and opened for experiments in 1983. It consisted of a tandem Van de Graaff generator (specifically, a Laddertron) operating routinely at 20 MV, housed in a distinctive building 70 m high. During its lifetime, it accelerated 80 different ion beams for experimental use, ranging from protons to uranium. A particular feature was the ability to accelerate rare isotopic and radioactive beams. Perhaps the most important discovery made using the NSF was that of super-deformed nuclei. These nuclei, when formed from the fusion of lighter elements, rotate very rapidly. The pattern of gamma rays emitted as they slow down provided detailed information about the inner structure of the nucleus. Following financial cutbacks, the NSF closed in 1993.

== Description ==
Van de Graaff generator diagram

A simple Van de Graaff generator consists of a belt of rubber (or a similar flexible dielectric material) moving over two rollers of differing material, one of which is surrounded by a hollow metal sphere. A comb-shaped metal electrode with sharp points (2 and 7 in the diagram), is positioned near each roller. The upper comb (2) is connected to the sphere, and the lower one (7) to ground. When a motor is used to drive the belt, the triboelectric effect causes the transfer of electrons from the dissimilar materials of the belt and the two rollers. In the example shown, the rubber of the belt will become negatively charged while the acrylic glass of the upper roller will become positively charged. The belt carries away negative charge on its inner surface while the upper roller accumulates positive charge.

Next, the strong electric field surrounding the positive upper roller (3) induces a very high electric field near the points of the nearby comb (2). At the points of the comb, the field becomes strong enough to ionize air molecules. The electrons from the air molecules are attracted to the outside of the belt, while the positive ions go to the comb. At the comb they are neutralized by electrons from the metal, thus leaving the comb and the attached outer shell (1) with fewer net electrons and a net positive charge. By Gauss's law (as illustrated in the Faraday ice pail experiment), the excess positive charge is accumulated on the outer surface of the outer shell, leaving no electric field inside the shell. Continuing to drive the belt causes further electrostatic induction, which can build up large amounts of charge on the shell. Charge will continue to accumulate until the rate of charge leaving the sphere (through leakage and corona discharge) equals the rate at which new charge is being carried into the sphere by the belt.

Outside the terminal sphere, a high electric field results from the high voltage on the sphere, which would prevent the addition of further charge from the outside. However, since electrically charged conductors do not have any electric field inside, charges can be added continuously from the inside without needing to overcome the full potential of the outer shell.

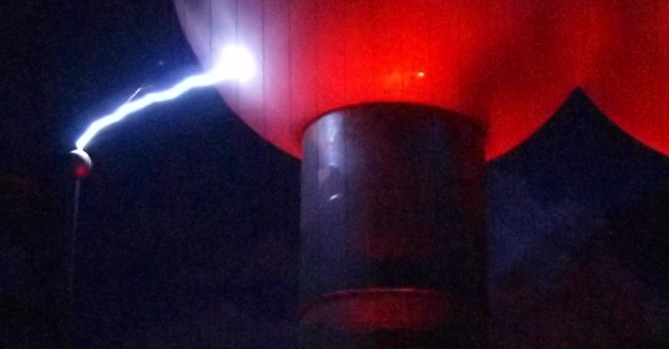
Spark made by the Van de Graaff generator at The Museum of Science in Boston, Massachusetts

The larger the sphere and the farther it is from ground, the higher its peak potential. The sign of the charge (positive or negative) can be controlled by the selection of materials for the belt and rollers. Higher potentials on the sphere can also be achieved by using a voltage source to charge the belt directly, rather than relying solely on the triboelectric effect.

A Van de Graaff generator terminal does not need to be sphere-shaped to work, and in fact, the optimum shape is a sphere with an inward curve around the hole where the belt enters. A rounded terminal minimizes the electric field around it, allowing greater potentials to be achieved without ionization of the air, or other dielectric gas, surrounding it. Since a Van de Graaff generator can supply the same small current at almost any level of electrical potential, it is an example of a nearly ideal current source.

The maximal achievable potential is roughly equal to the sphere radius R multiplied by the electric field E_{max} at which corona discharges begin to form within the surrounding gas. For air at standard temperature and pressure (STP) the breakdown field is about 30 kV/cm. Therefore, a polished spherical electrode 30 centimetres (12 in) in diameter could be expected to develop a maximal voltage V_{max} = R·E_{max} of about 450 kV. This explains why Van de Graaff generators are often made with the largest possible diameter.

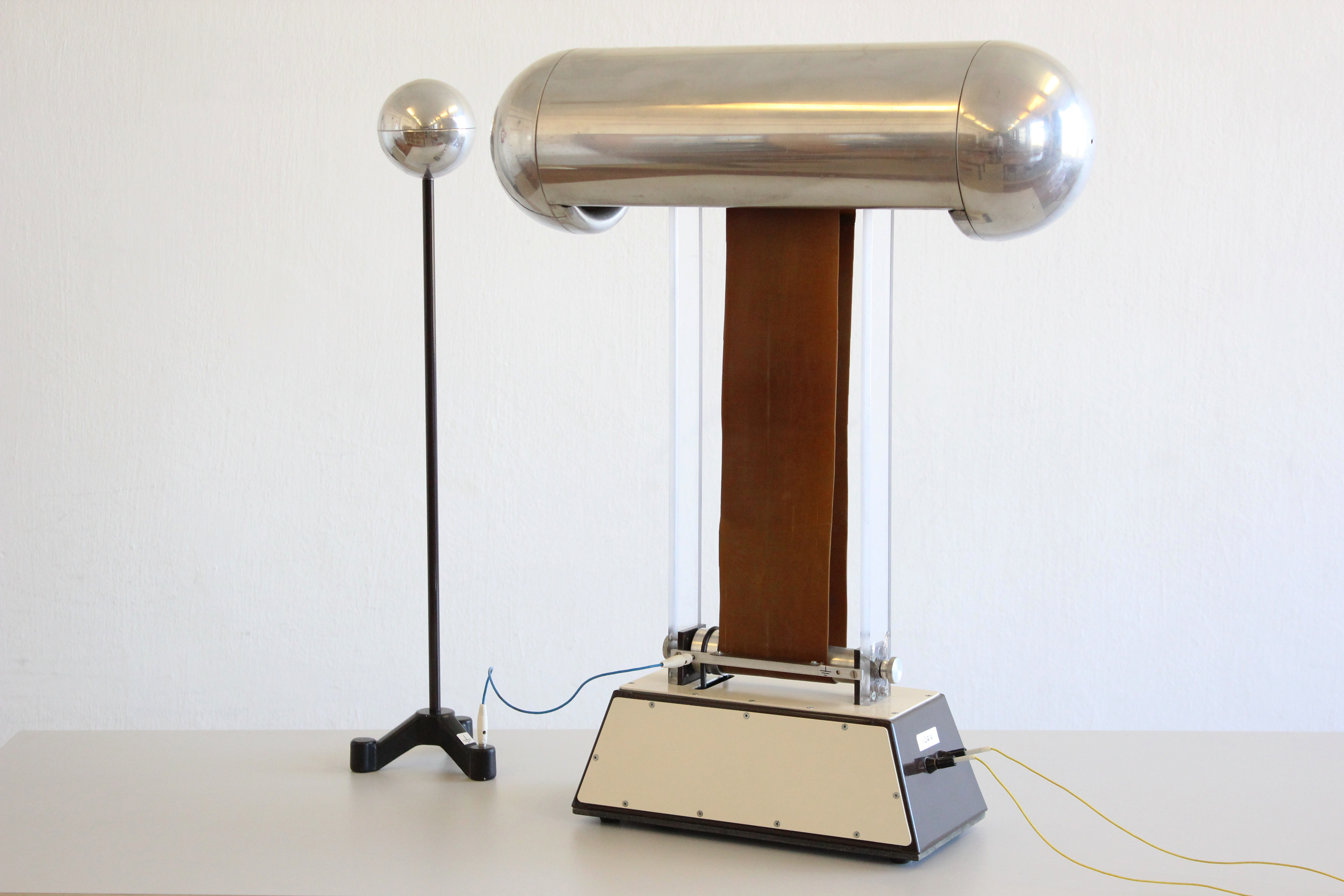
Van de Graaff generator for educational use in schools

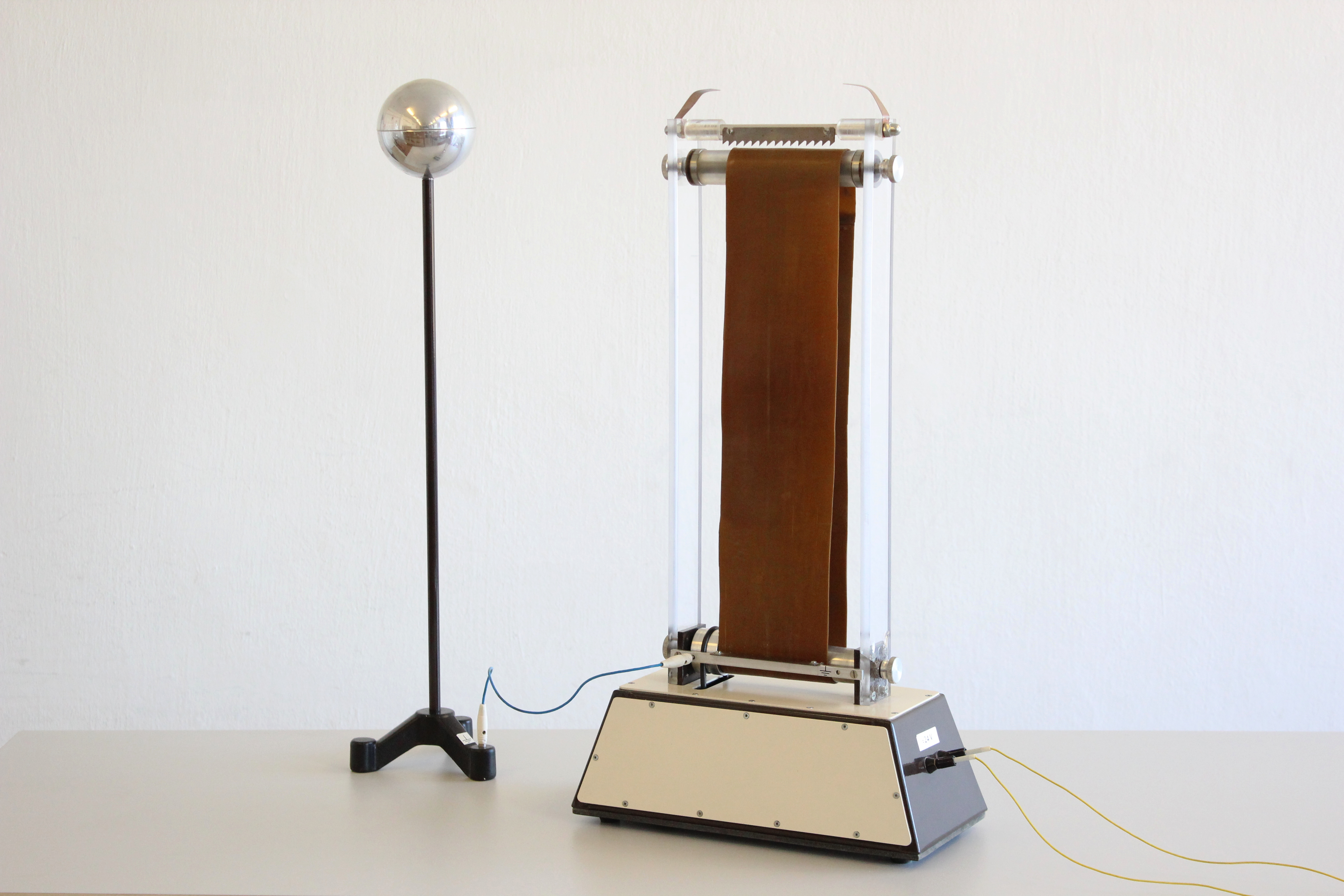
With sausage-shaped top terminal removed

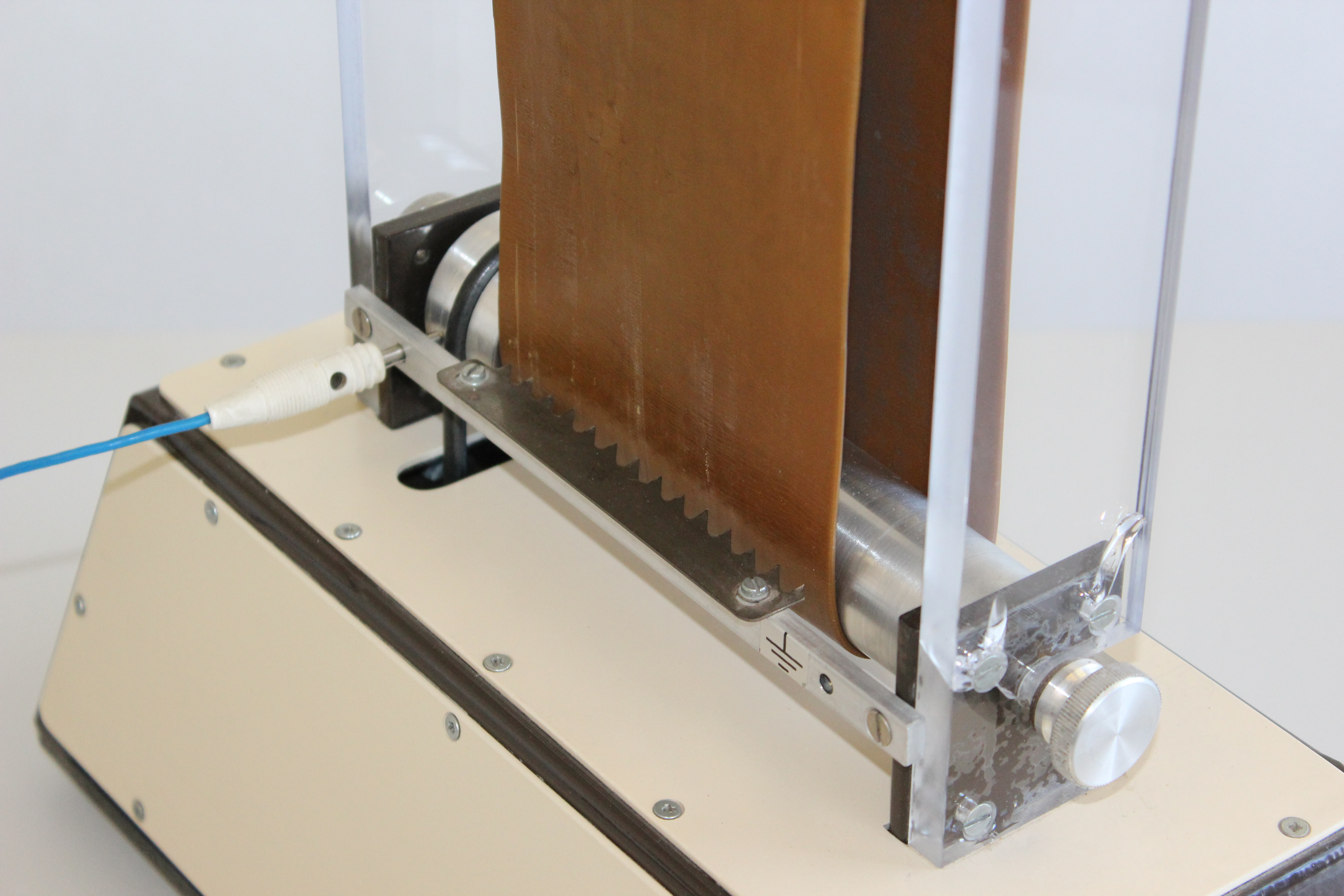
Comb electrode at bottom that deposits charge onto belt

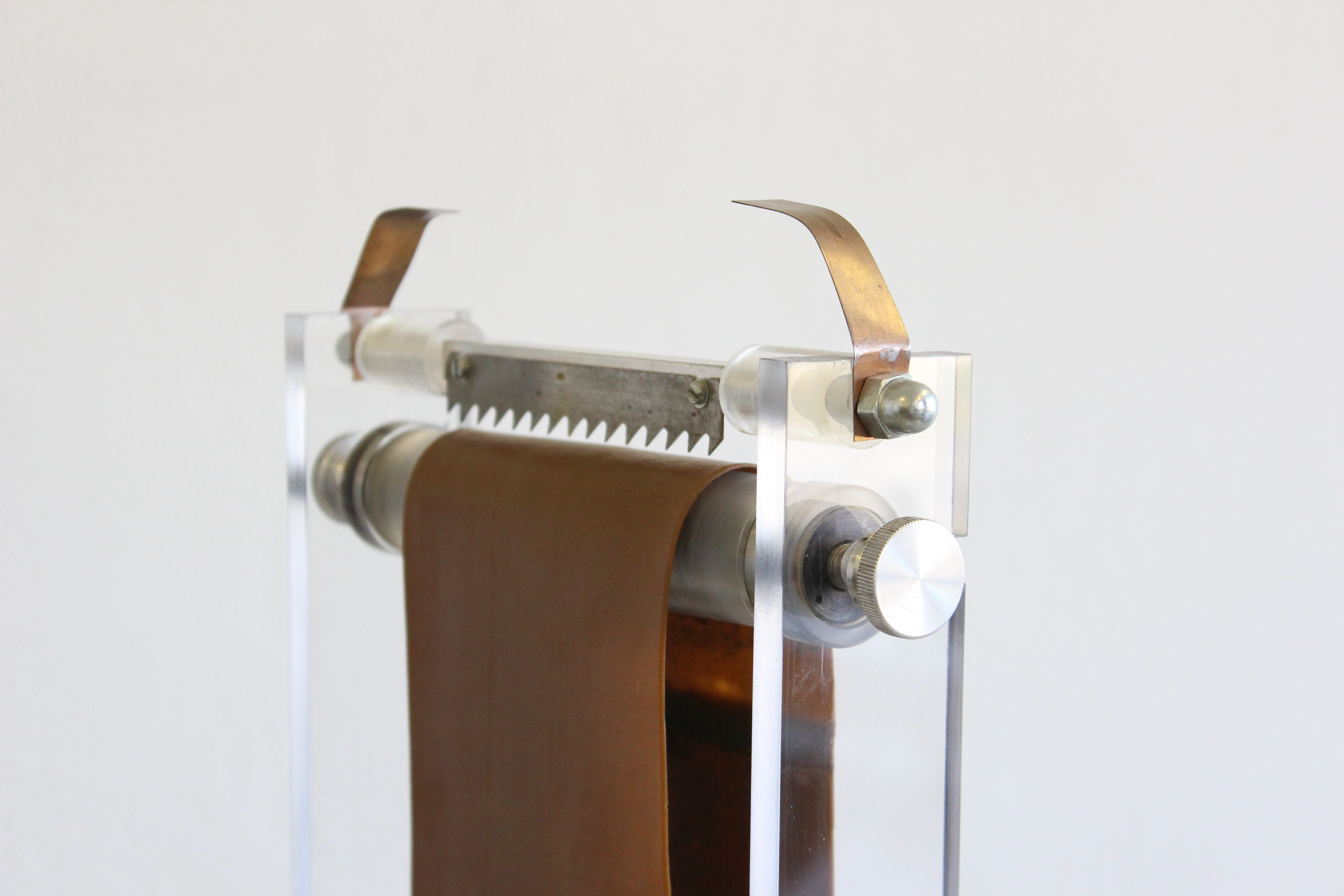
Comb electrode at top that removes charge from belt

== Use as a particle accelerator ==
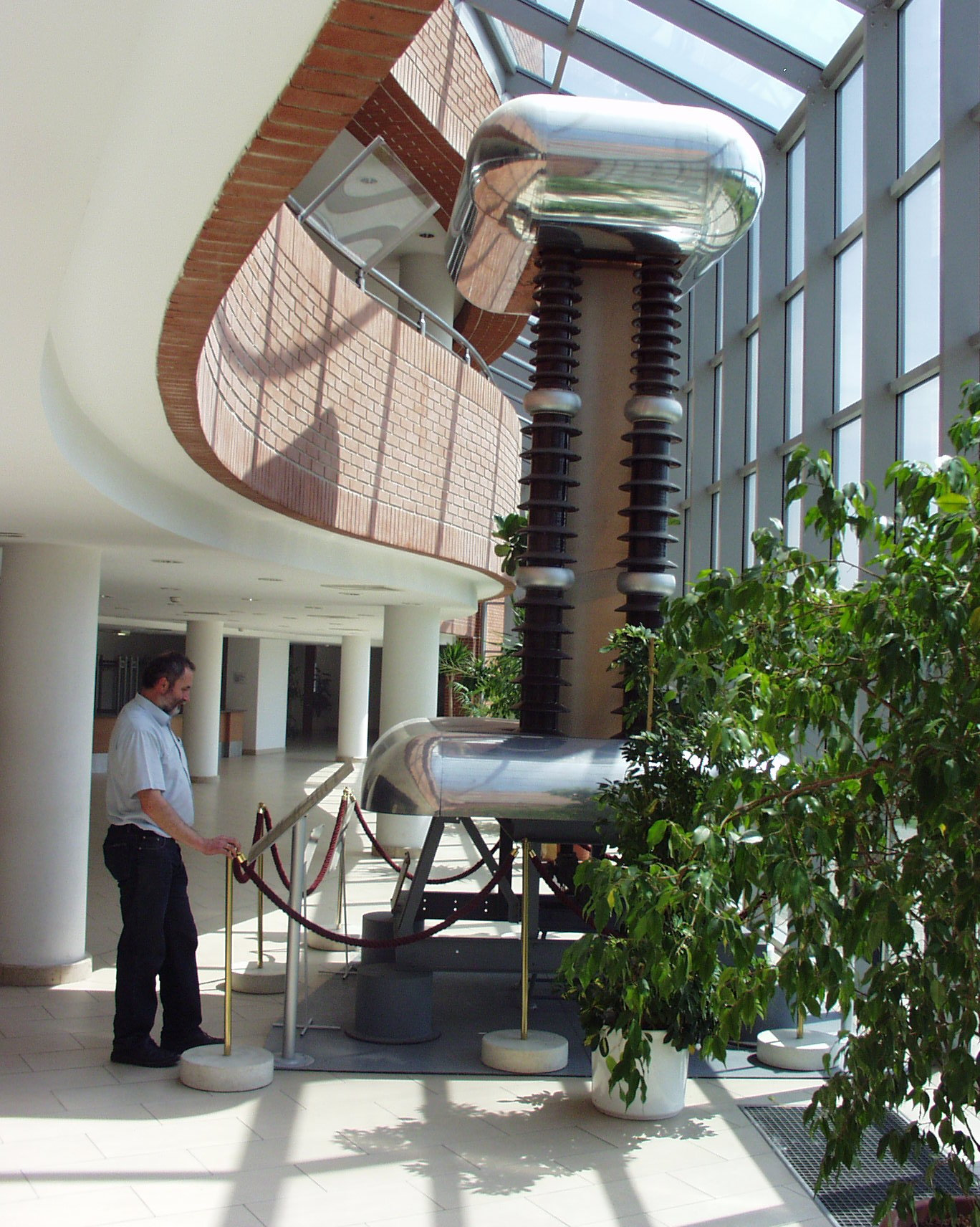
This Van de Graaff generator of the first Hungarian linear particle accelerator achieved 700 kV in 1951 and 1000 kV in 1952.

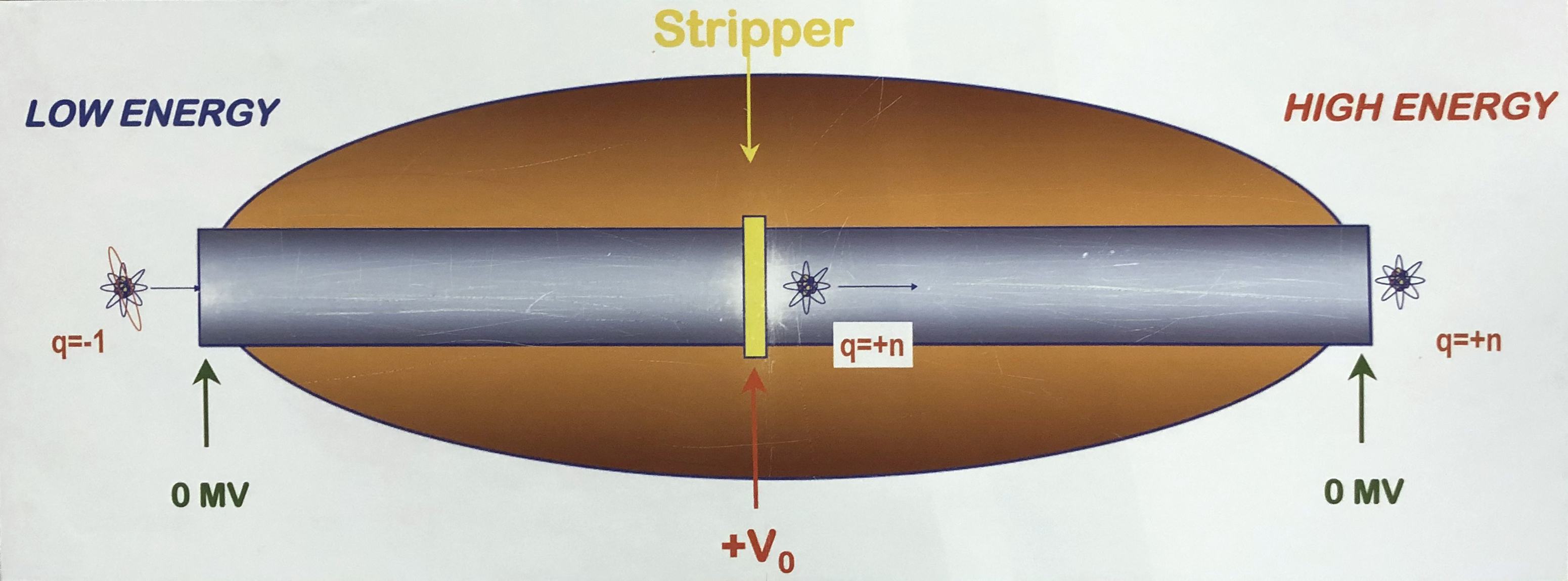
A simplified diagram of a tandem accelerator

The initial motivation for the development of the Van de Graaff generator was as a source of high voltage to accelerate particles for nuclear physics experiments. The high potential difference between the surface of the terminal and ground results in a corresponding electric field. When an ion source is placed near the surface of the sphere (typically within the sphere itself) the field will accelerate charged particles of the appropriate sign away from the sphere. By insulating the generator with pressurized gas, the breakdown voltage can be raised, increasing the maximum energy of accelerated particles.

=== Tandem accelerators ===
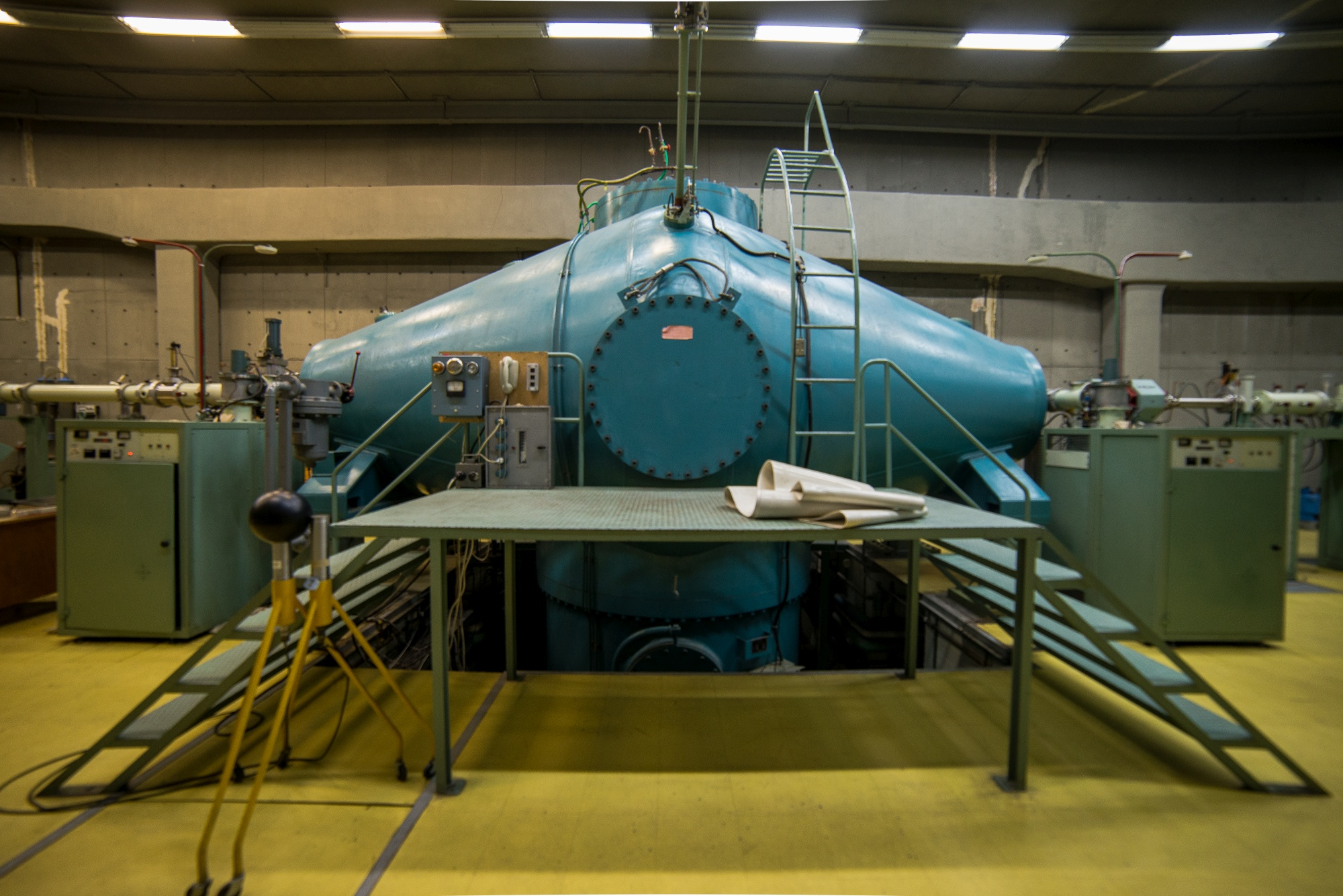
Van de Graaff Tandem accelerator at NCSRD in Greece

Particle-beam Van de Graaff accelerators are often used in a "tandem" configuration with the high potential terminal located at the center of the machine. Negatively charged ions are injected at one end, where they are accelerated by attractive force toward the terminal. When the particles reach the terminal, they are stripped of some electrons to make them positively charged, and are subsequently accelerated by repulsive forces away from the terminal. This configuration results in two accelerations for the cost of one Van de Graaff generator and has the added advantage of leaving the ion source instrumentation accessible near ground potential.

=== Pelletron ===
The pelletron is a style of tandem accelerator designed to overcome some of the disadvantages of using a belt to transfer charge to the high voltage terminal. In the pelletron, the belt is replaced with "pellets", metal spheres joined by insulating links into a chain. This chain of spheres serves the same function as the belt in a traditional Van de Graff accelerator – to convey charge to the high voltage terminal. The separate charged spheres and higher durability of the chain mean that higher voltages can be achieved at the high voltage terminal, and charge can be conveyed to the terminal more quickly.

== Entertainment and educational generators ==
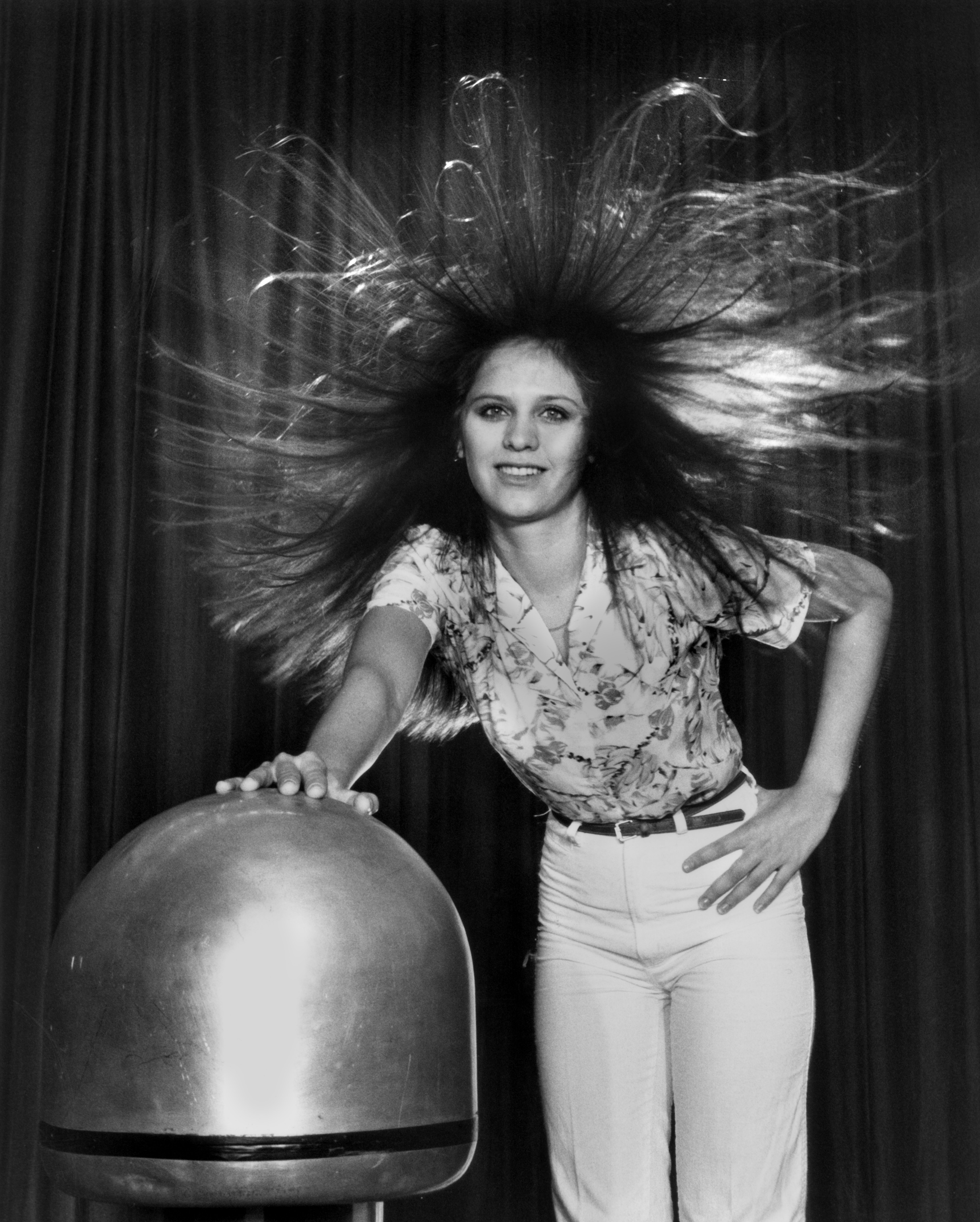
Woman touching Van de Graaff generator at the American Museum of Science and Energy. The charged strands of hair repel each other and stand out from her head

The Round Hill generator, the largest air-insulated Van de Graaff generator in the world, completed by Dr. Van de Graaff in 1933, is now displayed permanently at Boston's Museum of Science. With two conjoined 4.5 m (15 ft) aluminium spheres standing on columns 22 ft (6.7 m) tall, this generator can often obtain 2 MV (2 million volts). Shows using the Van de Graaff generator and several Tesla coils are conducted two to three times a day.

Many science museums, such as the American Museum of Science and Energy, have small-scale Van de Graaff generators on display, and exploit their static-producing qualities to create "lightning" or make people's hair stand up. Van de Graaff generators are also used in schools and science shows.

== Comparison with other electrostatic generators ==
Other electrostatic machines such as the Wimshurst machine or Bonetti machine work similarly to the Van De Graaff generator; charge is transported by moving plates, disks, or cylinders to a high voltage electrode. For these generators, however, corona discharge from exposed metal parts at high potentials and poorer insulation result in smaller voltages. In an electrostatic generator, the rate of charge transported (current) to the high-voltage electrode is very small. After the machine is started, the voltage on the terminal electrode increases until the leakage current from the electrode equals the rate of charge transport. Therefore, leakage from the terminal determines the maximum voltage attainable. In the Van de Graaff generator, the belt allows the transport of charge into the interior of a large hollow spherical electrode. This is the ideal shape to minimize leakage and corona discharge, so the Van de Graaff generator can produce the greatest voltage. This is why the Van de Graaff design has been used for all electrostatic particle accelerators. In general, the larger the diameter and the smoother the sphere is, the higher the voltage that can be achieved.

== Patents ==
- U.S. patent 1,991,236 — "Electrostatic Generator"
- U.S. patent 2,922,905 — "Apparatus For Reducing Electron Loading In Positive-Ion Accelerators"

== See also ==
- Electrostatic levitation – Process of levitating a charged object using electric fields
- Faraday cage – Enclosure of conductive mesh used to block electric fields
- Metal spinning – Metalworking process – Metalworking process used to fabricate thin metal spheres
- Oudin coil – Resonant transformer circuit
- Tesla coil – Electrical resonant transformer circuit invented by Nikola Tesla
