= Constantia Alexandrou =

Cypriot physicist

Constantia Alexandrou (Greek: Κωνσταντία Αλεξάνδρου) is a Cypriot theoretical physicist whose research focuses on hadron physics, including using the use of lattice QCD to elucidate the proton spin crisis. She is a Professor at the University of Cyprus and Institute Professor at The Cyprus Institute.

== Education and career ==
Alexandrou studied physics at the University of Oxford, receiving a bachelor's degree there with first class honours in 1980. She continued her studies in the US at the Massachusetts Institute of Technology, where she completed her Ph.D. in 1985. Her dissertation was Stochastic study of one-dimensional many-fermion systems.

After postdoctoral research at the Paul Scherrer Institute in Switzerland and Erlangen University in Germany, she became an assistant professor at the University of Cyprus in 1993. She was promoted to associate professor in 1996 and full professor in 2003. She was the founding head of the Department of Physics of the University of Cyprus and since 2010 she has held a second affiliation as Institute Professor at The Cyprus Institute,. She spearheaded the creation of the Computation-based Science and Technology Research Center of The Cyprus Institute and was its Acting Director from 2011 to 2022.

In 2022 she was elected for a two-year term as chair of PRACE, the Partnership for Advanced Computing in Europe. She was elected for a second two-year term in 2024.

== Recognition ==
In 2019, Alexandrou received the International Fellow Award of the Helmholtz Association, funding a research visit to DESY in Germany. She was elected as a Fellow of the American Physical Society in 2024, after a nomination from the APS Division of Nuclear Physics, "for the pioneering contributions in calculating nucleon structure observables using lattice QCD".
