= Photofission =

Fission of a nucleus via absorption of a gamma ray

Photofission is a process in which a nucleus, after absorbing a gamma ray, undergoes nuclear fission and splits into two or more fragments.

The reaction was discovered in 1940 by a small team of engineers and scientists operating the Westinghouse Atom Smasher at the company's Research Laboratories in Forest Hills, Pennsylvania. They used a 5 MeV proton beam to bombard fluorine and generate high-energy photons, which then irradiated samples of uranium and thorium.

Gamma radiation of modest energies (~10 MeV) can induce fission in traditionally fissile elements such as the actinides thorium, uranium, plutonium, and neptunium. Experiments have been conducted with much higher energy gamma rays, finding that the photofission cross section varies little for gamma radiation in the ~1 GeV range.

Baldwin et al. measured the photofission cross section of various elements, and found ~5×10^{−26} cm^{2} for uranium, ~2.5×10^{−26} cm^{2} for thorium, and no comparable signal (cross sections < 10^{−29} cm^{2}) for other heavy elements they measured. They used continuous x-ray from a 100-MeV betatron. Fission was detected in the presence of an intense background of x-rays by a differential ionization chamber and linear amplifier, the substance investigated being coated on an electrode of one chamber.

== Photodisintegration ==
Photodisintegration (also called phototransmutation) is a similar but different physical process, in which an extremely high energy gamma ray interacts with an atomic nucleus and causes it to enter an excited state, which immediately decays by emitting a subatomic particle.
