= Centre for Research and Restoration of Museums of France =

French cultural conservation center

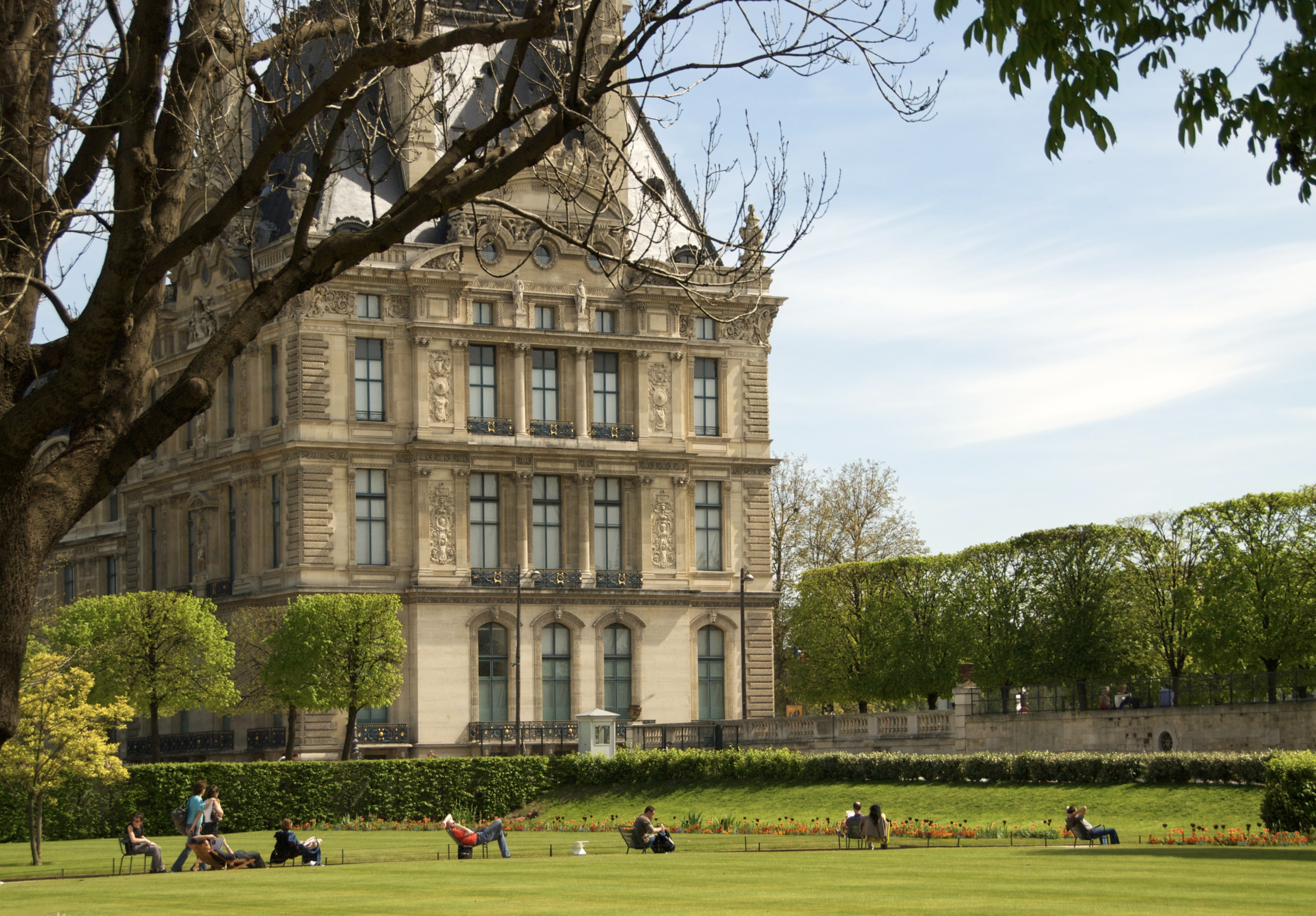

Current logo for the C2RMF

The National Centre for Research and Restoration in French Museums (C2RMF, Centre de recherche et de restauration des musées de France) is the national research centre in France responsible for the documentation, and restoration of the items held in the collections of more than 1,200 museums across France.

== History ==
The centre was established in 1998 by an arrêté (administrative decision) issued by Catherine Trautmann, the then Minister of Culture and Communications, which was gazetted in the Journal Officiel on December 30. It was created by merging the functions and facilities of two other research bodies, the Laboratoire de recherche des musées de France (LRMF, Research Laboratory of the Museums of France) and the Service de restauration des musées de France (SRMF, Restoration Service of the Museums of France) and it is organized in 4 departments. Today the center is affiliated to the CNRS with the label UMR-171.

== Directors ==
In 2005 Mme. Christiane Naffah was appointed director of the centre by the French Minister of Culture and Communications Renaud Donnedieu de Vabres, replacing Jean-Pierre Mohen. Naffah had been a curator in France's national museums since 1977, and prior to her appointment had held positions at the Louvre, Musée du Quai Branly and had been director of the Musée de l'institut du monde arabe. The actual director is MR. Jean-Michel Loyer-Hascoët.

== Activity ==
The C2RMF's key activities focus on the study of works of art at both a national and regional level. It undertakes investigations prior to any acquisition. Equipped with world-class experimental facilities that are constantly being improved, like the particle accelerator AGLAE, the C2RMF focuses its research on several key areas: the physical and chemical characteristics of materials, the ageing of materials, database management, image analysis, digitisation and 3D modelling. The C2RMF is experienced in the use of scientific techniques on art works. They also have knowledge and experience of the capture of 3D data from many different types of artefact. The latest research has concerned the multispectral imaging of paintings, ontologies and the semantic web and the 3D modelling of objects and paintings. Furthermore, it has launched an open source database management system that provides multilingual access (17 languages) to specialised vocabularies for the cultural museum sector and a semantic interface to browse the results.

C2RMF also carries out scientific studies and data recording for these collections, and is active both nationally and internationally in the field of cultural heritage conservation and analysis. The C2RMF is involved in the development of technologies and scientific procedures employed in the preservation of art works and artefacts, both on its own and in partnership with other museums and research institutions across the globe.

Since the early 1930s, over 174,000 paintings and 34,000 objects have been individually studied or restored by the C2RMF, and its predecessor organisations LRMF and SRMF.

== Sources ==
- Boutaine, Jean Louis (2006). "The modern museum". In David Bradley; Dudley Creagh (eds.). Physical Techniques in the Study of Art, Archaeology and Cultural Heritage, vol. 1. Amsterdam: Elsevier. pp. 1–40. ISBN 0-444-52131-3. OCLC 76714223.
- Brandt-Grau, Astrid (2002). "Research in the field of conservation of cultural heritage at the French Ministry of Culture and Communication" (PDF). In Miloš Drdácký (dir. and coord.) (ed.). Proceedings of ARIADNE 10 – New materials and technologies for conservation and safeguarding of cultural heritage. Advanced Research Initiation Assisting and Developing Networks in Europe (ARIADNE), Workshop 10 (Prague: April 22–28, 2002). published online as. Prague: Advanced Research Centre for Cultural Heritage Interdisciplinary Projects [ARCCHIP], Institute of Theoretical and Applied Mechanics, Academy of Sciences of the Czech Republic. Archived from the original (PDF workshop presentation) on 2015-09-23.
- Calligaro, Thomas; Jean-Claude Dran; M. Klein (May 2003). "Application of photo-detection to art and archaeology at the C2RMF". Nuclear Instruments and Methods in Physics Research Section A. 77 (1–4): 66–70. Bibcode:2003NIMPA.504..213C. doi:10.1016/S0168-9002(03)00793-9.
- Castaing, Jacques; Michel Menu (2006). "Analysis of Art Works and Nuclear Physics at the Laboratory of Centre de recherche et de restauration des musées de France" (PDF online edition). Nuclear Physics News. 16 (4): 4–10. doi:10.1080/10506890601061437. S2CID 122770983.
- Colantoni, Philippe; Denis Pitzalis; Ruven Pillay; Geneviève Aitken (2007). D. Arnold; F. Niccolucci; A. Chalmers (eds.). GPU Spectral Viewer: Analysing Paintings from a Colorimetric Perspective. VAST07: The 8th International Symposium on Virtual Reality, Archaeology and Intelligent Cultural Heritage: Proceedings. Brighton, UK: Eurographics Association.
- EU-ARTECH (2004). "AGLAE". Transnational Access: General Information. Access, Research and Technology for the conservation of the European Cultural Heritage (Eu-ARTECH). Archived from the original on 2007-11-16.
- Lahanier, Christian (2004). "Information technologies applied to scientific examination of museum collections". In Marco Martini; Mario Milazzo; Mario Piacentini (eds.). Physics Methods in Archaeometry: Proceedings of the International School of Physics "Enrico Fermi", Varenna on Lake Como, Villa Monastero, 17–27 June 2003. Amsterdam: IOS Press, Società Italiana di Fisica. pp. 155–178. ISBN 1-58603-424-3. OCLC 56320182.
- Lövestam, N.E. Göran; Thomas Calligaro; Alain Duval; Joseph Salomon (May 1993). "The AGLAE scanning nuclear microprobe setup". Nuclear Instruments and Methods in Physics Research B. 77 (1–4): 66–70. Bibcode:1993NIMPB..77...66L. doi:10.1016/0168-583X(93)95526-B.
- Maurus, Véronique (2006). La vie secrète du Louvre (in French). Jean-Christophe Ballot (photo illus.). Brussels: Renaissance Du Livre, in association with Le Monde. ISBN 2-87415-615-9. OCLC 69733461.
- Menu, Michel; Thomas Calligaro; Joseph Salomon; Georges Amsel; Jean Moulin (January 1990). "The dedicated accelerator-based IBA facility AGLAE at the Louvre". Nuclear Instruments and Methods in Physics Research B. 45 (1–4): 610–614. Bibcode:1990NIMPB..45..610M. doi:10.1016/0168-583X(90)90910-M.
- Naffah, Christiane (2007). Science applied to museum collections (PDF). The Protection of Cultural Heritage from Air Pollution: The need for effective local policy, maintenance and conservation strategies. 2nd joint workshop (Paris-Louvre: 15–16 March 2007). Stockholm: EU Project CULT-STRAT and ICP Materials Task Force of the Convention on Long-Range Transboundary Air Pollution. EU contract no. SSPI-CT-2004-501609. Archived from the original (PDF of conference presentation) on 3 October 2011.
- Pillay, Ruven; Geneviève Aitken; Denis Pitzalis; Christian Lahanier (2007). J. Trant; D. Bearman (eds.). Archive Visualization and Exploitation at the C2RMF. International Cultural Heritage Informatics Meeting (ICHIM07): Proceedings. Toronto: Archives & Museum Informatics. OCLC 153578634.
- Pitzalis, Denis; Christian Lahanier; Geneviève Aitken; Ruven Pillay; Karina Rodriguez-Echavarria; David B. Arnold (2007). José Braz; Pere-Pau Vàzquez; Joao Madeiras Pereira (eds.). 3D techniques to create interactive virtual museums: The state of the art in the epoch noe. GRAPP 2007, Proceedings of the Second International Conference on Computer Graphics Theory and Applications. Barcelona: INSTICC - Institute for Systems and Technologies of Information, Control and Communication.
- SCHEMA (2002). "Centre for Research and Restoration of the Museums of France". Project Consortium: Partners. Informatics and Telematics Institute (ITI). Archived from the original on 2016-10-11.
