= George C. Baldwin =

American physicist

- Born: May 5, 1917; Denver, Colorado
- Died: January 23, 2010 (age 92); Albuquerque, New Mexico
- Education: Kalamazoo College; University of Illinois at Urbana–Champaign
- Scientific career
- Fields: Atomic and nuclear experimental and theoretical physics
- Workplaces: General Electric Research Laboratory; Argonne National Laboratory; Rensselaer Polytechnic Institute; Los Alamos National Laboratory
- Thesis: Measurements on the Nuclear Photo-Effect at Energies Below 20 MeV (1943)
- Doctoral advisor: Donald William Kerst

George Curriden Baldwin (May 5, 1917 – January 23, 2010) was an American theoretical and experimental physicist. He was a professor of nuclear engineering at Rensselaer Polytechnic Institute and a scientist working at the General Electric Research Laboratory and at the Los Alamos National Laboratory. He wrote a book on Nonlinear Optics and authored or co-authored over 130 technical papers.

== Education and career ==
George C. Baldwin earned his B.S. degree in physics from Kalamazoo College in 1939 and his Ph.D. in physics from the University of Illinois at Urbana–Champaign in 1943. His Ph.D. thesis was on the nuclear photo-effect; his thesis advisor was Donald William Kerst.

Continuing at Illinois, he taught college-level physics in the Army Specialized Training Program during World War II. He joined General Electric Research Laboratory in Schenectady, New York, as a physicist working on industrial research and development (1944-1967). He directed the Argonaut Research Reactor facility at Argonne National Laboratory, conducting neutron measurements and developing operational procedures (1958-1959). He was a Professor of Nuclear Engineering at Rensselaer Polytechnic Institute in Troy, New York (1967-1977). He continued his research at the Los Alamos National Laboratory in Los Alamos, New Mexico (1977-1987).

== Scientific contributions ==
Baldwin's fields of research included photo-nuclear reactions with bremsstrahlung radiation from electron accelerators, resulting in the discovery of the giant dipole resonance; orbit dynamics of synchrotrons; nuclear reactor physics; electrical propulsion for space; low-energy electron scattering in gases; nonlinear optics; and investigation of the feasibility of a gamma-ray laser.

His early research involved perfecting GE's 100 MeV Betatron for use as an x-ray source. Using bremsstrahlung radiation from the betatron beam, he and G. S. Klaiber excited uranium nuclei and observed a prominent peak at about 20 MeV in the cross section for photons (1947), (1948), which was not anticipated by the nuclear physics community. This "giant dipole resonance" discovered by Baldwin and Klaiber was subsequently explained theoretically by Edward Teller and Maurice Goldhaber, and others.

Baldwin's research with low-energy electron scattering on noble gases extended the scattering cross-section data to very low energies, well under 1 eV (1967), a technically difficult task.

His book "An Introduction to Nonlinear Optics" (1969) helped bridge the gap in knowledge between specialists in the field and engineers and technical managers involved with this new technology.

Baldwin, along with GE colleagues, developed ideas for nuclear radiation analogues of the optical laser, now known as the gamma-ray laser, or Gamma-Ray Amplification by Stimulated Emission of Radiation (GRASER). He launched international efforts to define and quantify issues facing the development of this advanced idea, working with many academic colleagues, including R. V. Khokhlov and V. I. Gol'danskii of the USSR and J. C. Solem of Los Alamos, opening an entirely new field of physics and making bold, creative attempts to bring the concept to fruition (1963), (1965), (1975).

He authored an early bibliography of literature on the problem of developing gamma-ray lasers, covering the period 1917 through 1979 (1979).

Baldwin investigated methods for detecting nuclear stimulated emission, seeking to demonstrate coherent emission from nuclear states, but establishing that a number of innovative ideas were unworkable. He and his colleagues identified criteria necessary for the process of laser action at gamma-ray energies. He collaborated on theoretical issues, on experiments to demonstrate isomer separation by selective photoionization (1983), and on modeling of the kinetics of gamma-ray lasers.

Decades of his gamma-ray laser work, together with that of others, is assessed in a paper (1981) and a second assessment concentrates on later work on recoilless gamma-ray lasers (1997). These review papers contain an extensive list of references.

He collaborated with J. C. Solem on research on the use of x-ray microholography to image biological specimens (1982).

== Personal life ==
Baldwin's 57-year marriage to his wife Winifred, who collaborated as copy editor and typist for many of his publications, produced three children and seven grandchildren, of these three obtained a college degree in physics. Baldwin was an avid amateur astronomer, grinding his own lenses and building his own telescopes; fisherman; self-taught pianist, entertaining friends by playing by ear; and historical researcher. One of Baldwin's notable accomplishments was locating an inscription left by the Dominguez-Escalante expedition of 1776, discovered originally in 1884 by his father on a surveying expedition in northern Arizona. Baldwin organized the 1995/1996 Museum of New Mexico expeditions that found the Escalante inscription and documented this in the Journal of the Southwest (1999).

== Publications ==
=== Books ===
- Baldwin, George C. (1969). An Introduction to Nonlinear Optics. Springer. doi:10.1007/978-1-4613-4615-9. ISBN 978-0-306-20004-5.
- Baldwin, George C. (2006). The Science Was Fun: Selected Recollections of a Life in Science. AuthorHouse.

=== Cited articles ===
- Baldwin, G. C.; Klaiber, G. S. (1947). "Photo-fission in heavy elements". Physical Review. 71 (1): 3. Bibcode:1947PhRv...71....3B. doi:10.1103/physrev.71.3.
- Baldwin, G. C.; Klaiber, G. S. (1948). "X-ray yield curves for $\gamma$—n reactions". Physical Review. 73 (10): 1156. doi:10.1103/physrev.73.1156.
- Baldwin, G. C.; Neissel, J. P.; Tonks, L.; Vali, V.; Vali, W. (1963). "Induced gamma-ray emission". Proceedings of the IEEE. 51 (9): 1247–1248. doi:10.1109/proc.1963.2512.
- Terhune, J. H.; Baldwin, G. C. (1965). "Nuclear superradiance in solids". Physical Review Letters. 14 (15): 589. Bibcode:1965PhRvL..14..589T. doi:10.1103/physrevlett.14.589.
- Baldwin, G. C.; Friedman, S. I. (1967). "Time-of-flight electron velocity spectrometer". Review of Scientific Instruments. 38 (4): 519–531. Bibcode:1967RScI...38..519B. doi:10.1063/1.1720752.
- Baldwin, G. C.; Khokhlov, R. V. (1975). "Prospects for a gamma-ray laser". Physics Today. Vol. 28, no. 2. pp. 32–39. Bibcode:1975PhT....28b..32B. doi:10.1063/1.3068817.
- Baldwin, G. C. (1979). "Bibliography of GRASER research". Los Alamos Scientific Laboratory Report LA-7783-MS. doi:10.2172/6165356. OSTI 6165356.
- Baldwin, G. C.; Solem, J. C.; Gol'Danskii, V. I. (1981). "Approaches to the development of gamma-ray lasers". Reviews of Modern Physics. 53 (4): 687. Bibcode:1981RvMP...53..687B. doi:10.1103/revmodphys.53.687.
- Solem, J. C.; Baldwin, G. C. (1982). "Microholography of living organisms". Science. 218 (4569): 229–235. Bibcode:1982Sci...218..229S. doi:10.1126/science.218.4569.229. PMID 17838608. S2CID 32381820.
- Dyer, P.; Baldwin, G. C.; Kittrell, D. G.; Abramson, E. (1983). "Isotopically selective photoionization of mercury atoms". Applied Physics Letters. 42 (3): 311–313. Bibcode:1983ApPhL..42..311D. doi:10.1063/1.93933.
- Baldwin, G. C.; Solem, J. C. (1995). "Recoilless gamma-ray lasers". Reviews of Modern Physics. 69 (4): 1085. Bibcode:1997RvMP...69.1085B. doi:10.1103/RevModPhys.69.1085.
- Baldwin, G. C.; Solem, J. C.; Gol'Danskii, V. I. (1997). "Recoilless gamma-ray lasers". Reviews of Modern Physics. 69 (4): 1085. Bibcode:1997RvMP...69.1085B. doi:10.1103/revmodphys.69.1085.
- Baldwin, G. C. (1999). "The Vanishing Inscription". Journal of the Southwest. 41 (2): 119–176. JSTOR 40170133.

== Honors and awards ==
- Fellow of the American Physical Society (1953)
- Distinguished Achievement Award, Kalamazoo College (1987)

== Patents ==
- U.S. Patent No. 2,331,788. Jan. 20, 1942. Baldwin, G. C. "Magnetic induction accelerator".
- U.S. Patent No. 2,803,767. Sept. 30, 1952. Baldwin, G. C.; Gaerttner, E. R.; Yeater, M. L. "Radiation sources in charged particle accelerators".
- U.S. Patent No. 2,902,613. April 9, 1954. Baldwin, G. C. "Adaptation of a high energy electron accelerator as a neutron source".
- U.S. Patent No. 2,902,604. Sept. 26, 1955. Baldwin, G. C. "Scintillation converter".
