= Didier Roux =

Director of Research and Innovation at Saint-Gobain

Didier Roux (born 16 May 1955) is a French physicochemist. He is director of research and innovation at Saint-Gobain and a member of the French Academy of sciences and the Academy of Technology.

== Biography ==
Roux was born in Neuilly-sur-Seine. Student at the École normale supérieure de Saint Cloud, Roux studies the influence of interactions between micelles on the critical behaviour of micro-emulsions during his doctorate at the University of Bordeaux. He studies the stability of micro-emulsions, discovers the existence of wave interactions and sponge phases. This work is of interest to the oil industry and particularly to Exxon, where he was appointed associate scientist in 1986. Research director at the CNRS in Bordeaux, he discovered a new type of instability, the onion phases corresponding to a dynamic transition from a lamellar phase oriented towards a multilamellar vesicle phase. These vesicles are used as micro chemical reactors or as biological vectors. He co-founded two biotechnology startups Capsulis, specialized in the microencapsulation of active substances, and Rheocontrol, which markets new rheometers. In 1998, he was appointed Deputy Scientific Director of Rhône-Poulenc and then director of research and innovation of Saint-Gobain in 2005. Roux was a member of the scientific board of the Institut Curie, the ESPCI ParisTech and the board of directors of ENS Lyon. He was appointed chairman of the Scientific Council of ADEME in 2013 and chairman of the Scientific Council of the Ecole Nationale des Ponts et Chaussés (ENPC) in 2015.

== Basic sciences and industrial innovations ==
Roux's career is based above all on the work of a fundamentalist researcher who has long been centred around the physico-chemistry of condensed matter. His most significant works correspond to studies at equilibrium and out of equilibrium of the behaviour of partially organized phases (liquid crystals, colloids, surfactants in solution...). On the one hand, they were based on both an experimental and theoretical modelling approach to describe and understand the behaviour of very flexible surfaces subjected to thermal fluctuations (fluctuating surfaces). This has made it possible to obtain a universal vision of the behaviour of these surfaces by highlighting in particular the existence of undulation interactions between membranes and the discovery of membrane phases randomly connected in space (sponge phase). On the other hand, his work on the out-of-equilibrium study of these phases has allowed us to discover a new type of instability, thus dramatically illustrating the structural change of the fragile material subjected to a flow (transition under flow from the lamellar phase to a phase of multilamellar vesicles). He then contributed and successfully illustrated how physico-chemistry skills could contribute to the understanding of cell biology by studying the case of colloidal objects interacting with cells (adhesion – internalization of artificial "viruses").

Subsequently, and led initially by chance to a discovery, he systematically worked towards applications of his work and those of others. The industrialization of a discovery-based technology: the production of "Spherulites " and the development of a measuring instrument that has been commercialized (the RheoScope) are examples. Through start-ups, the interest of relying directly on fundamental skills to participate in the creation of innovative industrial products. However, this is only one aspect of the systematic efforts it has been able to make, it has thus been able to contribute, within large industrial groups, to the emergence of innovations.

== Distinctions ==
Roux is the winner of the CNRS silver medal (1992), the IBM materials grand prize (1993), the Mergier-Bourdeix grand prize of the French Academy of sciences (1995) and the Grand prix de physique appliqué de la société française de physique. He was awarded the CNRS innovation medal in 2013. He is a member of the French Academy of sciences, the Academy of Technology and Chevallier of the Ordre national du mérite.

== Bibliography ==
- W. Gelbart, A. Ben Shaul, D. Roux, Surfactant in solutions: Modern ideas, Ed. Springer Verlag (1993)
- D. Roux, Comment faire rhyme habitable et durable, Ed. Hatier (2008)
