= Georges Amsel =

French physicist

- Born: 7 May 1933; Budapest, Hungary
- Died: 11 March 2017 (aged 83); Paris, France
- Education: Ecole Normale Supérieure
- Scientific career
- Fields: Physicist
- Institutions: French National Centre for Scientific Research

Georges Amsel (7 May 1933 – 11 March 2017) was a French physicist, Director of Research at the French National Centre for Scientific Research.

== Biography ==
Georges was born on 7 May 1933 in Budapest, Hungary to Hugo and Sara (Fried) Amsel. After having been deported from Hungary in 1944, and finding refuge in Switzerland in 1945, he undertook high-school studies in Geneva and then in Paris, continuing on in the Physics Laboratory of Ecole Normale Supérieure to obtain his doctorate in nuclear physics in 1963. During his doctoral study, and under the guidance of Pierre Aigrain he researched the possibilities for charged particle detection offered by semiconductor diodes and developed some of the first such detectors in 1959. He was invited to the first conference on semiconductor detectors, held at Asheville, NC, in 1960, where he presented the first Rutherford backscattering spectrometry to be obtained with a semiconductor detector. During this period, he studied low-energy nuclear reactions on stable isotopes, developing anodizing methods for manufacturing thin, self-supporting oxide films enriched in specific stable oxygen isotopes in collaboration with David Samuel at the Weizmann Institute in Israel. With these targets, he discovered the narrow resonances in the ^{18}O(p,a)^{15}N nuclear reaction. These discoveries were immediately put to use in the field of stable isotopic tracing of atomic transport processes during thin-film growth and transformation. In 1968, he headed the installation of the HVEC AN2500 accelerator in the Solid State Physics group of the Ecole Normale Supérieure. it was one of the first nuclear particle accelerators to be installed in a condensed matter physics laboratory rather than in a nuclear physics laboratory. During this time, he also laid down the foundations of the stochastic treatment of charged particle energy loss processes, opening the way to rapid and accurate calculations of excitation curves obtained around narrow nuclear resonances, and providing an approach to calculating the overshoot on the leading edge, due to the Lewis effect. He has helped in setting up several IBA laboratories around the world and was the director of AGLAE, the accelerator at the Louvre museum dedicated to analysis of cultural heritage materials.

== Awards and honors ==
- 1964, CNRS Bronze Medal.
- 1971, CNRS Silver Medal.
- 1984, Hevesy Medal.
- 1987, SERVANT prize of the French Academy of Sciences.
- 1989, Officer of the Order of Arts and Letters.
- 1993, Félix Robin prize from the French Physical Society.

Member of Société Française de Physique, Institute of Physics.
