= Westinghouse Atom Smasher =

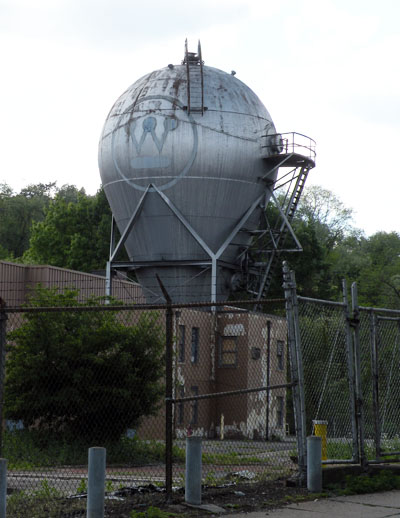
- The Atom Smasher on May 9, 2010, before the 2015 demolition
- Interactive map of the Westinghouse Atom Smasher area

General information
- Location: F Avenue & West, Forest Hills, Pennsylvania
- Coordinates: 40.4108661°N 79.8430295°W
- Opened: 1937
- Closed: 1958
- Demolished: January 20, 2015

Pennsylvania Historical Marker
- Designated: August 28, 2010

The Westinghouse Atom Smasher was a 5-million-volt Van de Graaff electrostatic nuclear accelerator operated by the Westinghouse Electric Corporation at their Research Laboratories in Forest Hills, Pennsylvania. It was instrumental in the development of practical applications of nuclear science for energy production. In particular, it was used in 1940 to discover the photofission of uranium and thorium, and was most cited for certain nuclear physics measurements. The Westinghouse Atom Smasher was intended to make measurements of nuclear reactions for research in nuclear power. It was the first industrial Van de Graaff generator in the world and marked the beginning of nuclear research for civilian applications. Built in 1937, it was a 65-foot-tall (20 m) pear-shaped tower. It was essentially unused after World War II, and the main structure was laid on its side in 2015. In 1985, it was named an Electrical Engineering Milestone by the Institute of Electrical and Electronics Engineers.

== History ==
The Westinghouse Atom Smasher was created due to the interest and development of physics in the early 1900s. In the year 1932, there were some major advancements in the research of nuclear physics. The technology of the particle accelerator has been categorized into three lines of research. The first started with Ernest Rutherford's studies into the properties of atomic particles in the 1920s. Then with John D. Cockroft and Ernest Walton producing the first nuclear disintegrations using artificially accelerated particles. The second line of research was focused on high-energy accelerators and the development of resonant acceleration. The third line of research was the invention of the betatron by Rolf Wideroe in 1923. With the discovery of the nucleus being fresh, much research was being done on how to commercialize it. The use of the particle accelerator allowed scientists to understand better how atoms, atomic nuclei, and nucleons are held together. The Westinghouse atom smasher was the first particle accelerator built for industrial uses. The atom smasher saw little use after the end of World War II.

== Mechanics ==
In a Van de Graaff generator, invented in 1929 by Robert J. Van de Graaff, an endless rubber or fabric belt carries electric charges from a roller at the base of the device and deposits them inside a hollow metal electrode at the top. This causes a high voltage to develop between electrodes at the top and bottom of the apparatus.

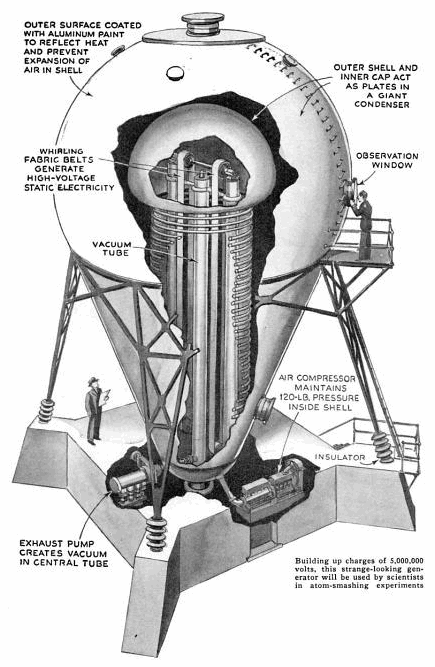
Drawing of the machine with part of the tank cut away, showing the belts and high voltage electrode

In the Westinghouse machine, two high-speed belts traveled up a 47-foot shaft to a mushroom-shaped electrode near the top of the bulb-shaped enclosure, where electric charges were accumulated (see cutaway schematic). Various ions, like those generated from hydrogen gas (protons) or helium gas (alpha particles), were injected into the upper part of an accelerator tube. The high electrostatic potential between the top and bottom of the tube then caused these subatomic particles to accelerate to extremely high velocities as they traveled down a 17-inch-diameter evacuated cylinder 40 feet in height, which was a sealed stack of many individual glass segments that collectively composed the largest vacuum tube in the world at the time of construction. The accelerator tube ran between and parallel to the whirling belts to the base of the machine, where the accelerated particles bombarded experimental targets placed inside the tube, inducing various nuclear reactions.

The energy of the particles was measured through the gamma rays that the beam produced when its particles hit a fluorine target, which was directly related to the voltage potential between the machine's electrodes.

The maximum voltage that a Van de Graaff generator can produce is limited by leakage of the charge off the upper electrode due to corona discharge and arcing. At atmospheric pressure, a Van de Graaff machine is generally limited to around 1 megavolt. Thus this instrument was installed inside a pear-shaped 65-foot tall, 30-foot diameter air tank which was pressurized during operation to 120 pounds per square inch. High pressure improved the insulating qualities of the air and reduced charge leakage, allowing the machine to achieve a voltage potential of 5 megavolts. This allowed a beam energy of 5 MeV, although it was originally hoped to reach 10 MeV.

== Wartime efforts ==
A view of the atom smasher in the 1930s or 1940s, when it was operational

During the Second World War, Westinghouse suspended fundamental research efforts, and instead focused on researching microwave radar. This is similar to how M.I.T and Harvard also began their own organizations to study radiation and radio during the war. The atom smasher was shut down so that Westinghouse could focus on the electronics department. Many of the contributors to the Westinghouse project moved on to find other jobs during this period of shut down, but stayed closely connected to the nuclear research that was happening during the time.

Westinghouse's Lamp Division in Bloomfield, NJ began production of uranium metal which was used in the first atomic pile. Prior to becoming Director of Research in the Lamp Division, Harvey Rentschler developed a method of reducing uranium salts into metal to study possible use as a lamp filament. He found that the melting point was too low to be used and decided to shut down the project, until the atomic pile in Chicago began. The only immediate source for uranium metals was the Bloomfield facility. Rentschler was asked to begin production of these metals again for this new project. He started with a crude, low-level production line using galvanized wash tubs as vessels before enlarging the project to further production. E. U. Condon as well as some other atom smasher workers, were sent to work closely on the Manhattan Project to develop uranium isotope separation techniques. The atom smasher itself was used as a compressed air tank for jet engine development during the war.

As the war ended, Westinghouse returned to its normal research activities, bringing back many workers and the refurbished atom smasher. It was found, however, that the iron used for the atom smasher became brittle in low temperatures and the atom smasher may have been damaged during the war. This fact was found when several Liberty ships sailed through the freezing waters of Alaska, their exteriors began to crack and break up, causing the ships to sink due to metal failure.

== Preservation efforts ==
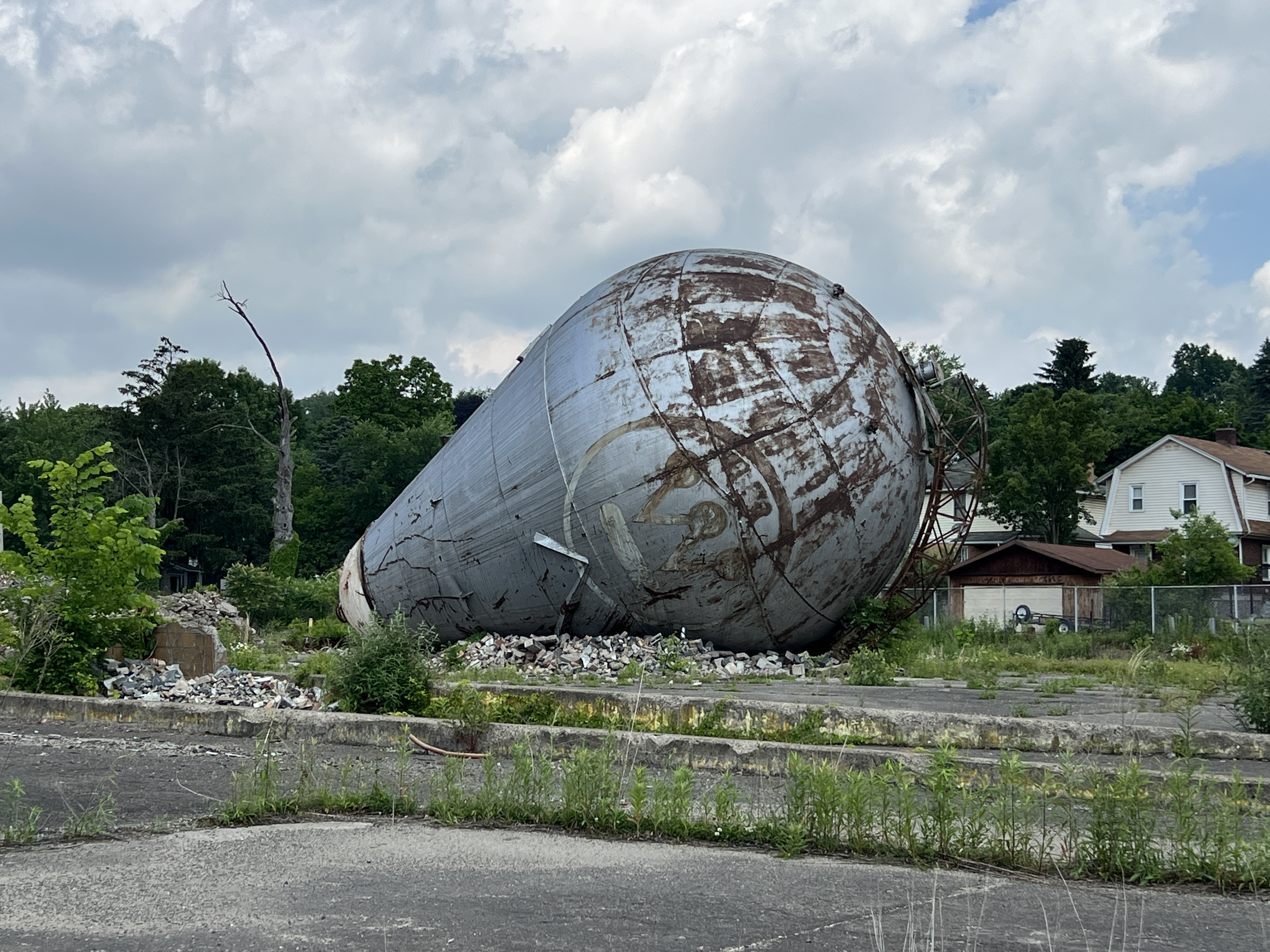
The Atom Smasher in 2022, dislodged from its supports

In 2012, the property surrounding the atom smasher was purchased by P&L Investments, LLC. The company was run by Gary Silversmith, a developer who intended to build apartments and expressed an interest in saving the smasher. In 2013, the Young Preservationists Association of Pittsburgh named it as one of the city's top 10 preservation opportunities. During 2013, plans had been discussed of the Woodland Hills School District establishing a STEM educational facility with the atom smasher as the centerpiece, but the $4 to $5 million cost was prohibitive and the project never moved forward.

By 2015, the structure was in significant disrepair and was dislodged from its supports, due to vandalism and age. On January 20, 2015, Silversmith had the atom smasher removed from its supports and laid on its side. Workers laid bricks to brace the fall, and tipped it over. In an email to the Pittsburgh Post-Gazette, Silversmith pronounced his continuing commitment to refurbishing and restoring the atom smasher, saying "The iconic Atom Smasher bulb survives."

In July 2026, Westinghouse announced plans to disassemble, restore, and preserve the Atom Smasher after years of deterioration at its original Forest Hills site. The structure, which had been lying on its side since 2015, is being relocated to Westinghouse's headquarters in Cranberry Township, Pennsylvania, where it is expected to be reassembled and displayed as a historical artifact. Westinghouse stated that the project is intended to preserve the landmark for future generations and recognize its role in the early development of nuclear science.

== See also ==
- List of Pennsylvania state historical markers in Allegheny County
