= Raymond Herb =

American nuclear physicist (1908–1996)

- Born: January 22, 1908; Navarino, Wisconsin, US
- Died: October 1, 1996 (aged 88)
- Education: University of Wisconsin–Madison (BA, 1931) (PhD, 1935)
- Known for: Developed the first practical Getter-ion Vacuum Pump. Built the first practical source of negative ions. Tandem accelerator Named Pelletrons.
- Spouse: Anne Williamson
- Children: 5
- Awards: Tom W. Bonner Prize (1968)
- Scientific career
- Fields: Nuclear Physics
- Workplaces: University of Wisconsin–Madison; Massachusetts Institute of Technology
- Patrons: Glen G. Havens; D. B. Parkinson; D. W. Kerst; G. J. Plain
- Notable students: J. A. Ferry

Raymond George Herb (January 22, 1908 – October 1, 1996) was an American professor of nuclear physics at the University of Wisconsin–Madison. He was known for building electrostatic accelerators. His work influenced the Manhattan Project, which built the first nuclear weapons. In 1960, the University of São Paulo awarded him an honorary doctorate. He won the Bonner Prize in 1968. He started a company called NEC that manufactures electrostatic accelerators. He was also a member of the National Academy of Sciences.

University of Wisconsin now holds a seminar series in his memory.

== Sources ==
- Complete biography at National Academy of Sciences
- University of Wisconsin–Madison Nuclear Experimental Physics Group
- University of Wisconsin–Madison R. G. Herb Seminars
- University of Wisconsin–Madison Nuclear Physics
- The Pelletron Accelerator
- Manhattan Project
- World Sci Books
- Cas.web.cern.ch
- University of Wisconsin–Madison Engineers' Day
- Barschall, Henry H. Raymond George Herb
- Electrostatic Accelerator Development at Wisconsin
