= Giant resonance =

High-frequency collective excitation of atomic nuclei

In nuclear physics, giant resonance is a high-frequency collective excitation of atomic nuclei, as a property of many-body quantum systems. In the macroscopic interpretation of such an excitation in terms of an oscillation, the most prominent giant resonance is a collective oscillation of all protons against all neutrons in a nucleus.

In 1947, G. C. Baldwin and G. S. Klaiber observed the giant dipole resonance (GDR) in photonuclear reactions; in 1972, the giant quadrupole resonance (GQR) was discovered; and in 1977, the giant monopole resonance (GMR) was discovered in medium and heavy nuclei.

== Giant dipole resonance ==
Giant dipole resonances may result in a number of de-excitation events, such as nuclear fission, emission of neutrons or gamma rays, or combinations of these.

Giant dipole resonances can be caused by any mechanism that imparts enough energy to the nucleus. Classical causes are irradiation with gamma rays at energies from 7 to 40 MeV, which couple to nuclei and either cause or increase the dipole moment of the nucleus by adding energy that separates charges in the nucleus. The process is the inverse of gamma decay, but the energies involved are typically much larger, and the dipole moments induced are larger than occur in the excited nuclear states that cause the average gamma decay.

High-energy electrons of >50 MeV may cause the same phenomenon, by coupling to the nucleus via a "virtual gamma photon", in a nuclear reaction that is the inverse (i.e., reverse) of internal conversion decay.

== See also ==
- Neutron emission
