= Costas N. Papanicolas =

Cypriot nuclear and particle physicist

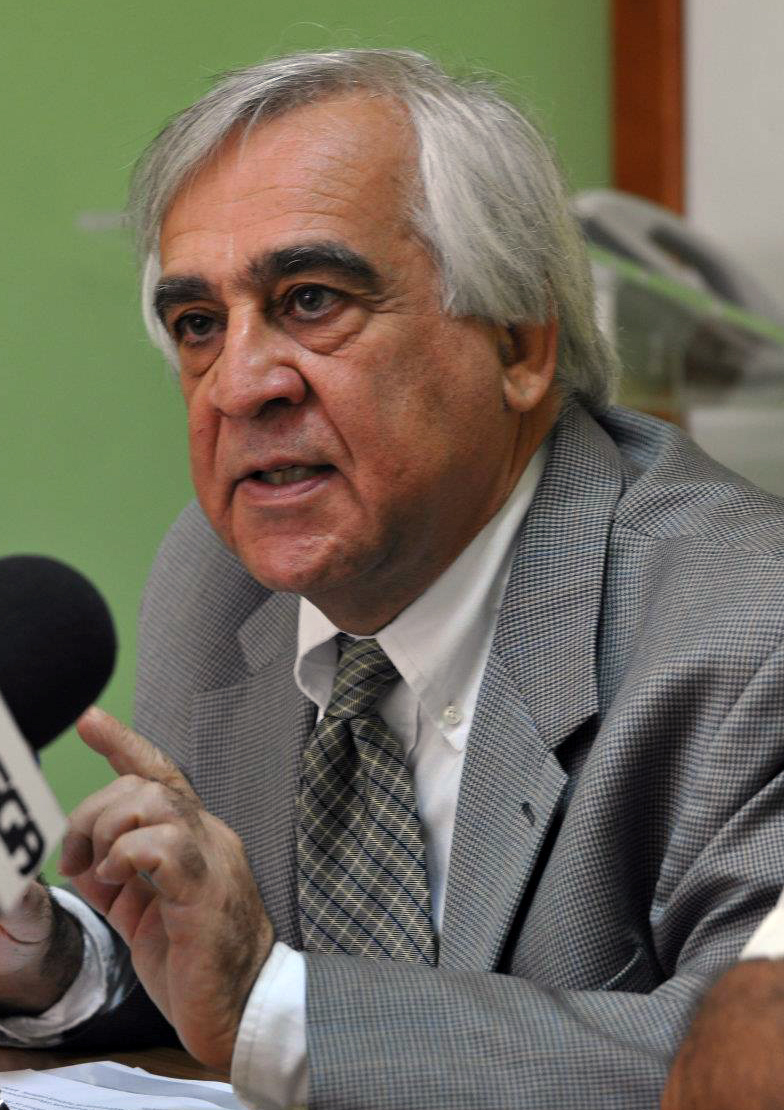
- Prof. Papanicolas
- Born: October 1, 1950 (age 75); Cyprus
- Education: Massachusetts Institute of Technology
- Scientific career
- Fields: Nuclear & Particle Physics, Solar Energy, Energy and Climate Policy
- Workplaces: The Cyprus Institute, University of Athens
- Doctoral advisor: Jochen Heisenberg
- Website: https://www.researchgate.net/profile/Cn-Papanicolas

Costas N. Papanicolas is a Cypriot nuclear and particle physicist with over 35 years' experience as a researcher, an educator and a scientific administrator.

His research interests are in the fields of particle & nuclear, hadronic physics, Solar Energy, Energy Policy and Climate Policy.

== Early life and education ==
He received his B.Sc. in physics (1972) and PhD in Nuclear Physics (1979) from the Massachusetts Institute of Technology (MIT) in the US.

== Career ==
Papanicolas has held positions at the French Atomic Energy Commission (Saclay, France) and was Professor of Physics at the University of Illinois (Urbana-Champaign, US) and at the University of Athens (Greece). He was the founding director of the Institute of Accelerating Systems and Applications (IASA) in Greece.

He is the CEO of the Cyprus Research and Educational Foundation (CREF) and, from 2008 to 2022, was president of The Cyprus Institute (CyI). In 2019, he was appointed as Advisor to the President of the Republic of Cyprus and Special Envoy on Climate Change.

During his career he held numerous positions in various organizations. He was a Member of the interim governing board and co-chair of the technical committee for the SESAME (Jordan), Chair of the appointments committee for the establishment of the Department of Natural Sciences of the University of Cyprus, and Chair of the Council on Educational Evaluation and Accreditation (CEEA) of the Republic of Cyprus. He was a Member of the National Advisory Council for Research and the National Council for Research and Technology of Greece. He was chair of the Cyprus-CERN Committee, Vice-chair of the Cyprus Scientific Council, the Senior Advisory scientific body to the Cyprus government, and a Member of the National Research Council of Cyprus which is chaired by the President of the Republic of Cyprus.

== Publications ==
Papanicolas has over 180 publications in peer-reviewed journals, numerous conference proceedings and has written many popular articles on matters of science, policy and education. He holds two patents (in medical physics and solar energy).

== Awards & honours ==
He was awarded the Arnold O. Beckman Award at the Univ. of Illinois (1988), as well as, he is a Fellow of the American Physical Society since 1994, a Member of Academia Europaea since 2011, a Member of the Silk Road Academy of Sciences (China) since 2017, and a Founding and Permanent Member of the Cyprus Academy of Sciences, Letters and the Arts (2019).

He is also professor emeritus, Senate of the University of Athens since 2018, and has received numerous awards, including the bestowment of a "Medal of Excellence for Service to the Cyprus Republic" (2019), the decoration as "Commendatore dell’ Ordine della Stella d’Italia" (2019), and J.M. Gago Award in European Science Policy”, bestowed by the Mister of Research and Higher Education of Portugal (2021).

Additionally, Pananicolas was elected Associate Member of the Overseas Academy of Sciences of France (ASOM) and he became the first Cypriot to receive such an honor.
