= Forest Hills, Pennsylvania =

Borough in Pennsylvania, US

- Borough
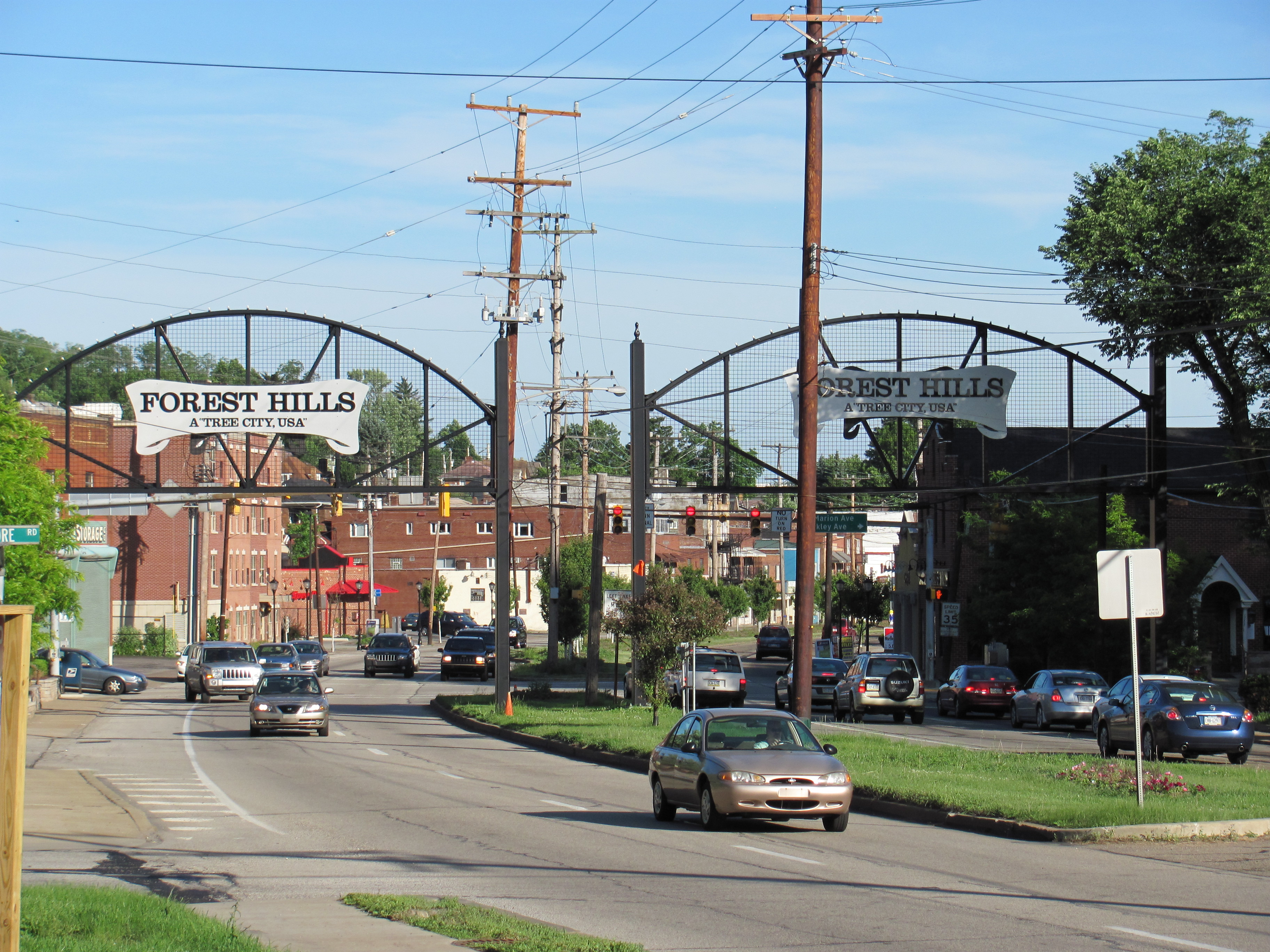
- Ardmore Blvd

- Nickname: Tree City, USA
- Location in Allegheny County and the U.S. state of Pennsylvania.
- Coordinates: 40°25′19″N 79°51′7″W
- Country: United States
- State: Pennsylvania
- County: Allegheny
- School district: Woodland Hills
- Founded: July 29, 1919
- Named for: Forest Hills, Queens

Government
  - Type: Mayor-Council
  - Mayor: Patricia DeMarco
  - Council: List: Angelo Baiocchi (President); Barbara Martin; An Lewis; Ian Bacon; Thomas Theilacker; Joseph DeCrosta; John Lawrence
  - Manager: Krista M. Watt

Area
  - Total: 1.56 sq mi (4.05 km^{2})
  - Land: 1.56 sq mi (4.05 km^{2})
  - Water: 0 sq mi (0.00 km^{2})

Population (2020)
  - Total: 6,429
  - Density: 4,108.9/sq mi (1,586.47/km^{2})
- Time zone: UTC-5 (Eastern (EST))
  - Summer (DST): UTC-4 (EDT)
- Zip Code: 15221
- Area codes: 412, 878
- FIPS code: 42-26592
- Website: www.foresthillspa.gov

Forest Hills is a borough in Allegheny County, Pennsylvania, United States. The population was 6,429 at the 2020 census. It is a suburb of the Pittsburgh metropolitan area. The borough was named after Forest Hills, Queens.

== Geography ==
Forest Hills is located at 40°25′19″N 79°51′7″W (40.421918, –79.851872). According to the United States Census Bureau, the borough has a total area of 1.6 square miles (4.1 km^{2}), all land.

=== Surrounding neighborhoods ===
Forest Hills has five borders, including Wilkinsburg and Churchill to the north, Wilkins Township to the east, Chalfant to the southeast, North Braddock to the south-southeast, and Braddock Hills from the south to the northwest. These municipalities, along with East Pittsburgh, Edgewood, Rankin, Swissvale, and Turtle Creek, make up the Woodland Hills School District.

== Demographics ==
Historical population
Census	Pop.	Note	%±
1930	4,549		—
1940	5,248		15.4%
1950	6,301		20.1%
1960	8,796		39.6%
1970	9,561		8.7%
1980	8,198		−14.3%
1990	7,335		−10.5%
2000	6,831		−6.9%
2010	6,518		−4.6%
2020	6,429		−1.4%

As of the 2010 census, there were 6,518 people, 3,099 households, and 1,807 families residing in the borough. The population density was 4,073.8 people per square mile (1,572.9 people/km^{2}). There were 3,304 housing units at an average density of 2,065.0 per square mile (797.3/km^{2}). The racial makeup of the borough was 87.68% White, 9.14% African American, 0.09% Native American, 1.18% Asian, 0.02% Pacific Islander, 0.40% from other races, and 1.49% from two or more races. Hispanic or Latino of any race were 1.32% of the population.

There were 3,099 households, out of which 21.1% had children under the age of 18 living with them, 45.4% were married couples living together, 9.5% had a female householder with no husband present, and 41.7% were non-families. 35.8% of all households were made up of individuals, and 31.0% had someone living alone who was 65 years of age or older. The average household size was 2.10 and the average family size was 2.74.

In the borough the population was spread out, with 18.7% under the age of 20, 4.3% from 20 to 24, 24.1% from 25 to 44, 33.2% from 45 to 64, and 19.7% who were 65 years of age or older. The median age was 47.5 years. For every 100 females, there were 87.3 males. For every 100 females age 18 and over, there were 82.6 males.

In 2000, the median income for a household in the borough was $44,922, and the median income for a family was $56,199. Males had a median income of $42,903 versus $31,103 for females. The per capita income for the borough was $26,505. About 4.7% of families and 5.6% of the population were below the poverty line, including 8.2% of those under age 18 and 2.7% of those age 65 or over.

== Arts and culture ==
Forest Hills is located along the Route 30 portion of the Lincoln Highway, which, along with Greensburg Pike, serves as a main artery of the borough.

Until 2015, near the eastern border with Chalfant, there once stood an historic, five-million-volt Van de Graaff generator and particle accelerator known as the Westinghouse Atom Smasher. The Atom Smasher operated from 1937 to 1958, and because of many important discoveries that were made using the device—it was designated an official historic landmark in 2010. However, the apparatus was torn down in 2015, when the property that had served as the primary campus of the Westinghouse Research Laboratories from 1916 to 1956 was being prepared for redevelopment.

== Government and politics ==
Presidential election results
Year	Republican	Democratic	Third parties
2020	27% 1,256	71% 3,230	0.9% 43
2016	31% 1,254	65% 2,636	3% 135
2012	37% 1.498	61% 2,440	1% 57

=== Representatives ===
Office/District	Incumbent	Party
Allegheny County Council (district 8)	Charles Martoni	Democrat
PA House of Representatives (district 34)	Abigail Salisbury	Democrat
PA Senate (district 43)	Jay Costa	Democrat
U.S. House of Representatives (PA district 18)	Summer Lee	Democrat
U.S. Senate	John Fetterman	Democrat
U.S. Senate	Dave McCormick	Republican

== Education ==
It is in the Woodland Hills School District.

The comprehensive high school for the district is Woodland Hills High School.
