= Electrostatic particle accelerator =

Accelerates particles with a static electric field

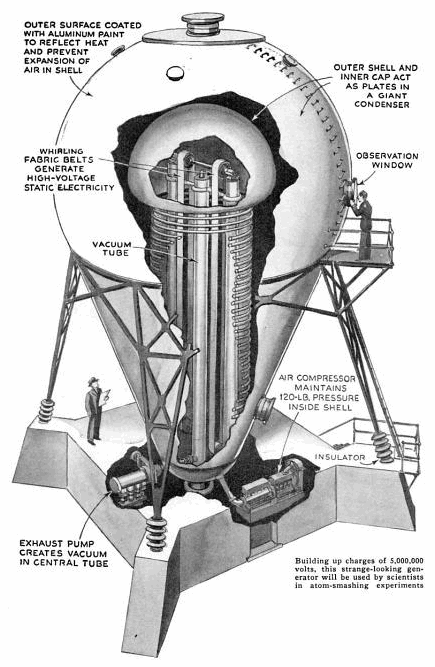
The Westinghouse Atom Smasher, an early Van de Graaff accelerator built 1937 at the Westinghouse Research Center in Forest Hills, Pennsylvania. The cutaway shows the fabric belts that carry charge up to the mushroom-shaped high-voltage electrode. To improve insulation the machine was enclosed in a 65 ft. pressure vessel which was pressurized to 120 psi during operation. The high pressure air increased the voltage on the machine from 1 MV to 5 MV.

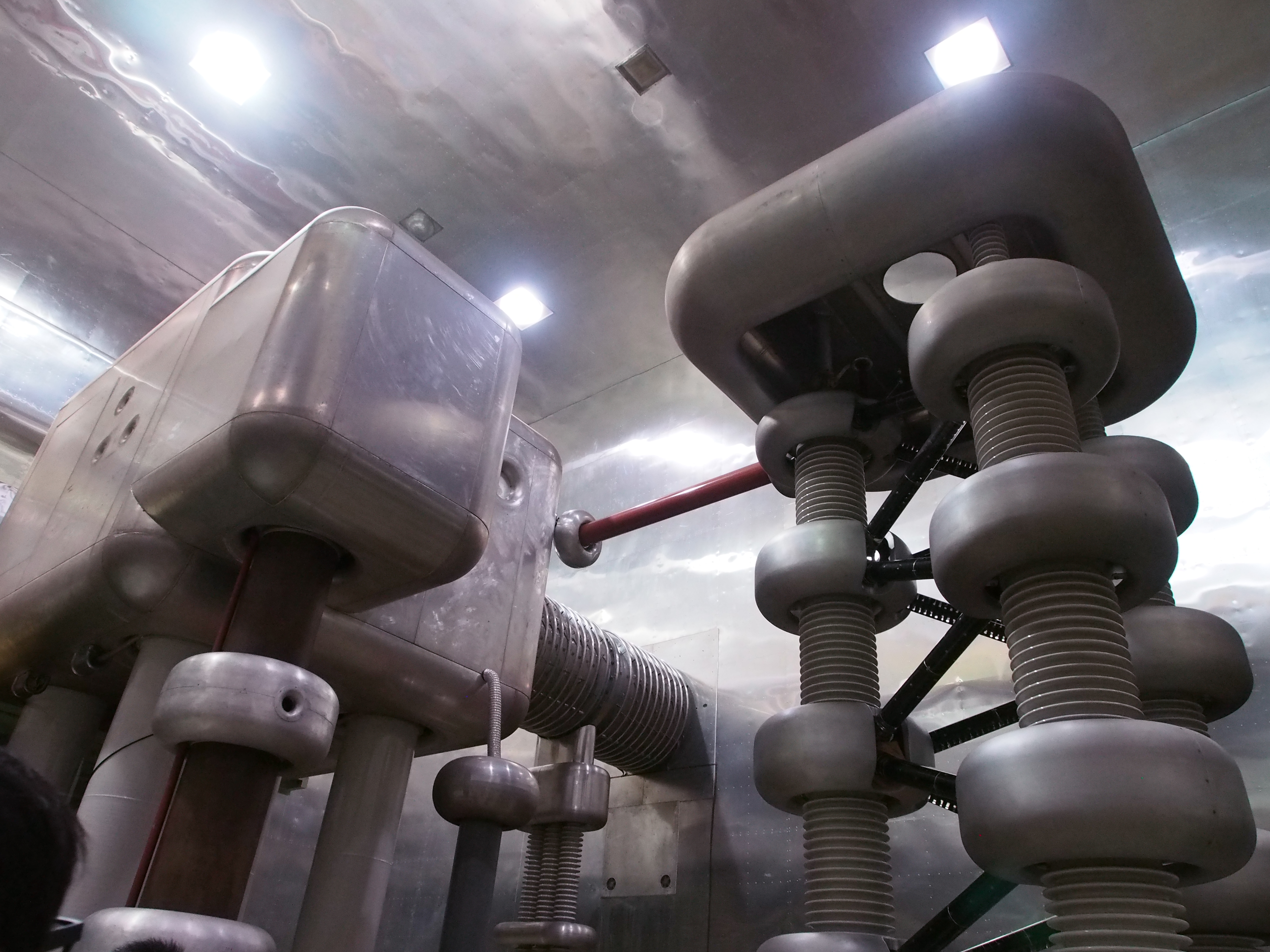
750 keV Cockcroft–Walton accelerator initial stage of the KEK accelerator in Tsukuba, Japan. The high-voltage generator is right, the ion source and beam tube is at left

An electrostatic particle accelerator is a particle accelerator in which charged particles are accelerated to a high energy by a static high-voltage potential. The reason that only charged particles can be accelerated is that only charged particles are influenced by an electric field, according to Lorentz' force law by the formula $\boldsymbol{F} = q \boldsymbol{E}$, which causes them to move. This contrasts with the other major category of particle accelerator, oscillating field particle accelerators, in which the particles are accelerated by oscillating electric fields.

Owing to their simpler design, electrostatic types were the first particle accelerators. The two most common types are the Van de Graaff generator invented by Robert Van de Graaff in 1929, and the Cockcroft–Walton accelerator invented by John Cockcroft and Ernest Walton in 1932. The maximum particle energy produced by electrostatic accelerators is limited by the maximum voltage which can be achieved the machine. This is in turn limited by insulation breakdown to a few megavolts. Oscillating accelerators do not have this limitation, so they can achieve higher particle energies than electrostatic machines.

The advantages of electrostatic accelerators over oscillating field machines include lower cost, the ability to produce continuous beams, and higher beam currents that make them useful to industry. As such, they are by far the most widely used particle accelerators, with industrial applications such as plastic shrink wrap production, high power X-ray machines, radiation therapy in medicine, radioisotope production, ion implanters in semiconductor production, and sterilization. Many universities worldwide have electrostatic accelerators for research purposes. High-energy oscillating-field accelerators usually incorporate an electrostatic machine as their first stage, to accelerate particles to a high enough velocity to inject into the main accelerator.

== Applications ==
Electrostatic accelerators have a wide array of applications in science and industry. In the realm of fundamental research, they are used to provide beams of atomic nuclei for research at energies up to several hundreds of MeV.

In industry and materials science they are used to produce ion beams for materials modification, including ion implantation and ion beam mixing. There are also a number of materials analysis techniques based on electrostatic acceleration of heavy ions, including Rutherford backscattering spectrometry (RBS), particle-induced X-ray emission (PIXE), accelerator mass spectrometry (AMS), Elastic recoil detection (ERD), and others.

Although these machines primarily accelerate atomic nuclei, there are a number of compact machines used to accelerate electrons for industrial purposes including sterilization of medical instruments, x-ray production, and silicon wafer production.

A special application of electrostatic particle accelerator is dust accelerators in which nanometer to micrometer sized electrically charged dust particles are accelerated to speeds up to 100 km/s. Dust accelerators are used for impact cratering studies, calibration of impact ionization dust detectors, and meteor studies.

== Single-ended machines ==
Using a high-voltage terminal kept at a static potential on the order of millions of volts, charged particles can be accelerated. In simple language, an electrostatic generator is basically a giant capacitor (although lacking plates). The high voltage is achieved either using the methods of Cockcroft & Walton or Van de Graaff, with the accelerators often being named after these inventors. Van de Graaff's original design places electrons on an insulating sheet, or belt, with a metal comb, and then the sheet physically transports the immobilized electrons to the terminal. Although at high voltage, the terminal is a conductor, and there is a corresponding comb inside the conductor which can pick up the electrons off the sheet; owing to Gauss's law, there is no electric field inside a conductor, so the electrons are not repulsed by the platform once they are inside. The belt is similar in style to a conventional conveyor belt, with one major exception: it is seamless. Thus, if the belt is broken, the accelerator must be disassembled to some degree in order to replace the belt, which, owing to its constant rotation and being made typically of a rubber, is not a particularly uncommon occurrence. The practical difficulty with belts led to a different medium for physically transporting the charges: a chain of pellets. Unlike a normal chain, this one is non-conducting from one end to the other, as both insulators and conductors are used in its construction. These types of accelerators are usually called Pelletrons.

Once the platform can be electrically charged by one of the above means, some source of positive ions is placed on the platform at the end of the beam line, which is why it's called the terminal. However, as the ion source is kept at a high potential, one cannot access the ion source for control or maintenance directly. Thus, methods such as plastic rods connected to various levers inside the terminal can branch out and be toggled remotely. Omitting practical problems, if the platform is positively charged, it will repel the ions of the same electric polarity, accelerating them. As E=qV, where E is the emerging energy, q is the ionic charge, and V is the terminal voltage, the maximum energy of particles accelerated in this manner is practically limited by the discharge limit of the high-voltage platform, about 12 MV under ambient atmospheric conditions. This limit can be increased, for example, by keeping the HV platform in a tank of an insulating gas with a higher dielectric constant than air, such as SF_{6} which has dielectric constant roughly 2.5 times that of air. However, even in a tank of SF_{6} the maximum attainable voltage is around 30 MV. There could be other gases with even better insulating powers, but SF_{6} is also chemically inert and non-toxic. To increase the maximum acceleration energy further, the tandem concept was invented to use the same high voltage twice.

== Tandem accelerators ==
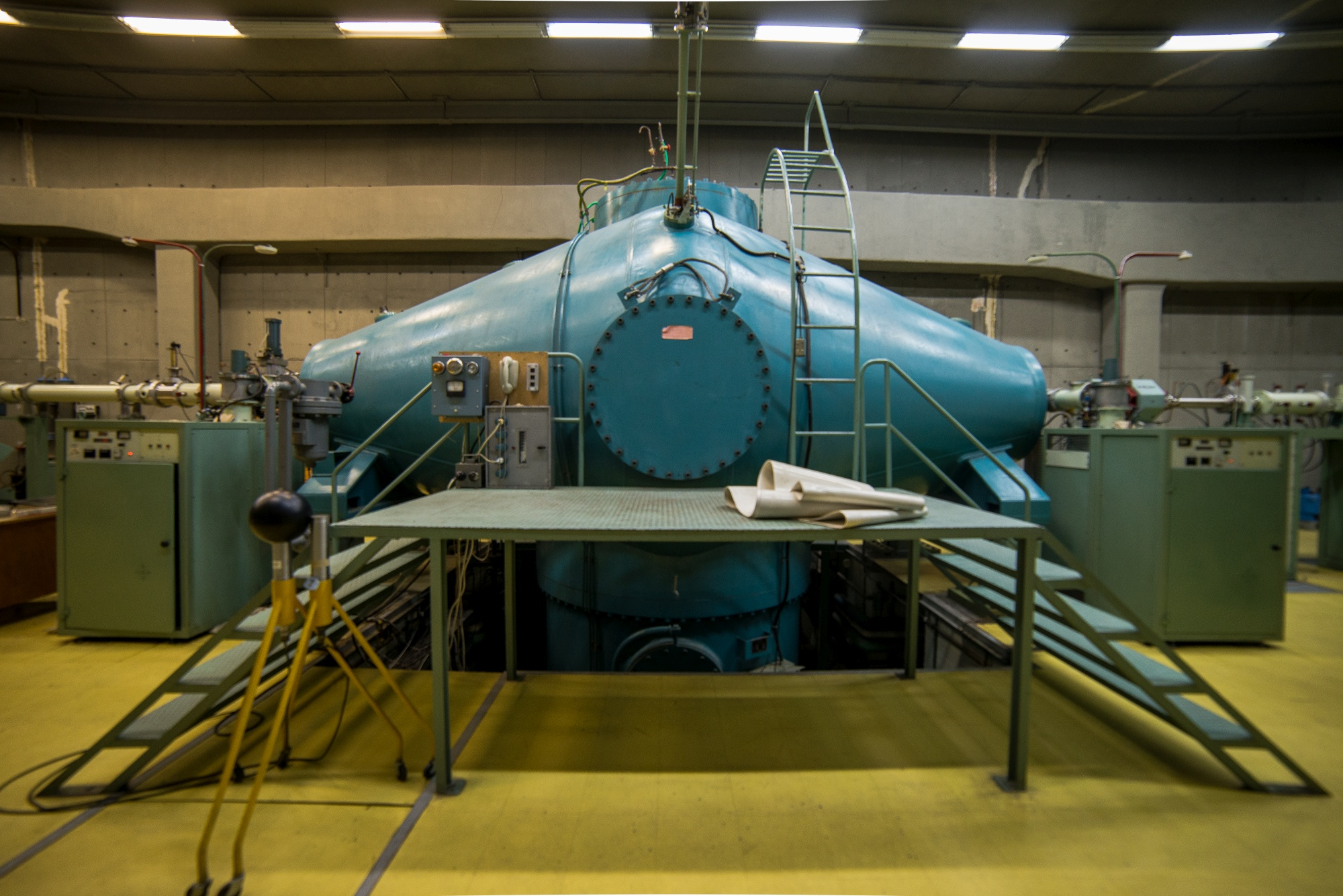
Electrostatic Van de Graaff Tandem nuclear accelerator at NCSRD in Greece

Conventionally, positively charged ions are accelerated because this is the polarity of the atomic nucleus. However, if one wants to use the same static electric potential twice to accelerate ions, then the polarity of the ions' charge must change from anions to cations or vice versa while they are inside the conductor where they will feel no electric force. It turns out to be simple to remove, or strip, electrons from an energetic ion. One of the properties of ion interaction with matter is the exchange of electrons, which is a way the ion can lose energy by depositing it within the matter, something we should intuitively expect of a projectile shot at a solid. However, as the target becomes thinner or the projectile becomes more energetic, the amount of energy deposited in the foil becomes less and less.

Tandems locate the ion source outside the terminal, which means that accessing the ion source while the terminal is at high voltage is significantly less difficult, especially if the terminal is inside a gas tank. So then an anion beam from a sputtering ion source is injected from a relatively lower voltage platform towards the high-voltage terminal. Inside the terminal, the beam impinges on a thin foil (on the order of micrograms per square centimeter), often carbon or beryllium, stripping electrons from the ion beam so that they become cations. As it is difficult to make anions of more than -1 charge state, then the energy of particles emerging from a tandem is E=(q+1)V, where we have added the second acceleration potential from that anion to the positive charge state q emerging from the stripper foil; we are adding these different charge signs together because we are increasing the energy of the nucleus in each phase. In this sense, we can see clearly that a tandem can double the maximum energy of a proton beam, whose maximum charge state is merely +1, but the advantage gained by a tandem has diminishing returns as we go to higher mass, as, for example, one might easily get a 6+ charge state of a silicon beam.

It is not possible to make every element into an anion easily, so it is very rare for tandems to accelerate any noble gases heavier than helium, although KrF^{−} and XeF^{−} have been successfully produced and accelerated with a tandem. It is not uncommon to make compounds in order to get anions, however, and TiH_{2} might be extracted as TiH^{−} and used to produce a proton beam, because these simple, and often weakly bound chemicals, will be broken apart at the terminal stripper foil. Anion ion beam production was a major subject of study for tandem accelerator application, and one can find recipes and yields for most elements in the Negative Ion Cookbook. Tandems can also be operated in terminal mode, where they function like a single-ended electrostatic accelerator, which is a more common and practical way to make beams of noble gases.

The name 'tandem' originates from this dual-use of the same high voltage, although tandems may also be named in the same style of conventional electrostatic accelerators based on the method of charging the terminal.

The MP Tandem van de Graaff is a type of Tandem accelerator. Ten of these were installed in the 20th century; six in North America and four in Europe.

== Geometry ==
One trick which has to be considered with electrostatic accelerators is that usually vacuum beam lines are made of steel. However, one cannot very well connect a conducting pipe of steel from the high-voltage terminal to the ground. Thus, many rings of a strong glass, like Pyrex, are assembled together in such a manner that their interface is a vacuum seal, like a copper gasket; a single long glass tube could implode under vacuum or fracture supporting its own weight. Importantly for the physics, these inter-spaced conducting rings help to make a more uniform electric field along the accelerating column. This beam line of glass rings is simply supported by compression at either end of the terminal. As the glass is non-conducting, it could be supported from the ground, but such supports near the terminal could induce a discharge of the terminal, depending on the design. Sometimes the compression is not sufficient, and the entire beam line may collapse and shatter. This idea is especially important to the design of tandems, because they naturally have longer beam lines, and the beam line must run through the terminal.

Most often electrostatic accelerators are arranged in a horizontal line. However, some tandems may have a "U" shape, and in principle the beam can be turned to any direction with a magnetic dipole at the terminal. Some electrostatic accelerators are arranged vertically, where either the ion source or, in the case of a U-shaped vertical tandem, the terminal, is at the top of a tower. A tower arrangement can be a way to save space, and also the beam line connecting to the terminal made of glass rings can take some advantage of gravity as a natural source of compression.

== Particle energy ==
In a single-ended electrostatic accelerator the charged particle is accelerated through a single potential difference between two electrodes, so the output particle energy $E$ is equal to the charge on the particle $q$ multiplied by the accelerating voltage $V$

$$E = qV$$

In a tandem accelerator the particle is accelerated twice by the same voltage, so the output energy is $(1+q)V$, as the anion form is singly charged. If the charge $q$ is in conventional units of coulombs and the potential $V$ is in volts the particle energy will be given in joules. However, because the charge on elementary particles is so small (the charge on the electron is 1.6×10^{−19} coulombs), the energy in joules is a very small number.

Since all elementary particles have charges which are multiples of the elementary charge on the electron, $e = 1.6(10^{-19})$ coulombs, particle physicists use a different unit to express particle energies, the electron volt (eV) which makes it easier to calculate. The electronvolt is equal to the energy a particle with a charge of 1e gains passing through a potential difference of one volt. In the above equation, if $q$ is measured in elementary charges e and $V$ is in volts, the particle energy $E$ is given in eV. For example, if an alpha particle which has a charge of 2e is accelerated through a voltage difference of one million volts (1 MV), it will have an energy of two million electron volts, abbreviated 2 MeV. The accelerating voltage on electrostatic machines is in the range 0.1 to 25 MV and the charge on particles is a few elementary charges, so the particle energy is in the low MeV range. More powerful accelerators can produce energies in the giga electron volt (GeV) range.
