= Pelletron =

Type of electrostatic generator

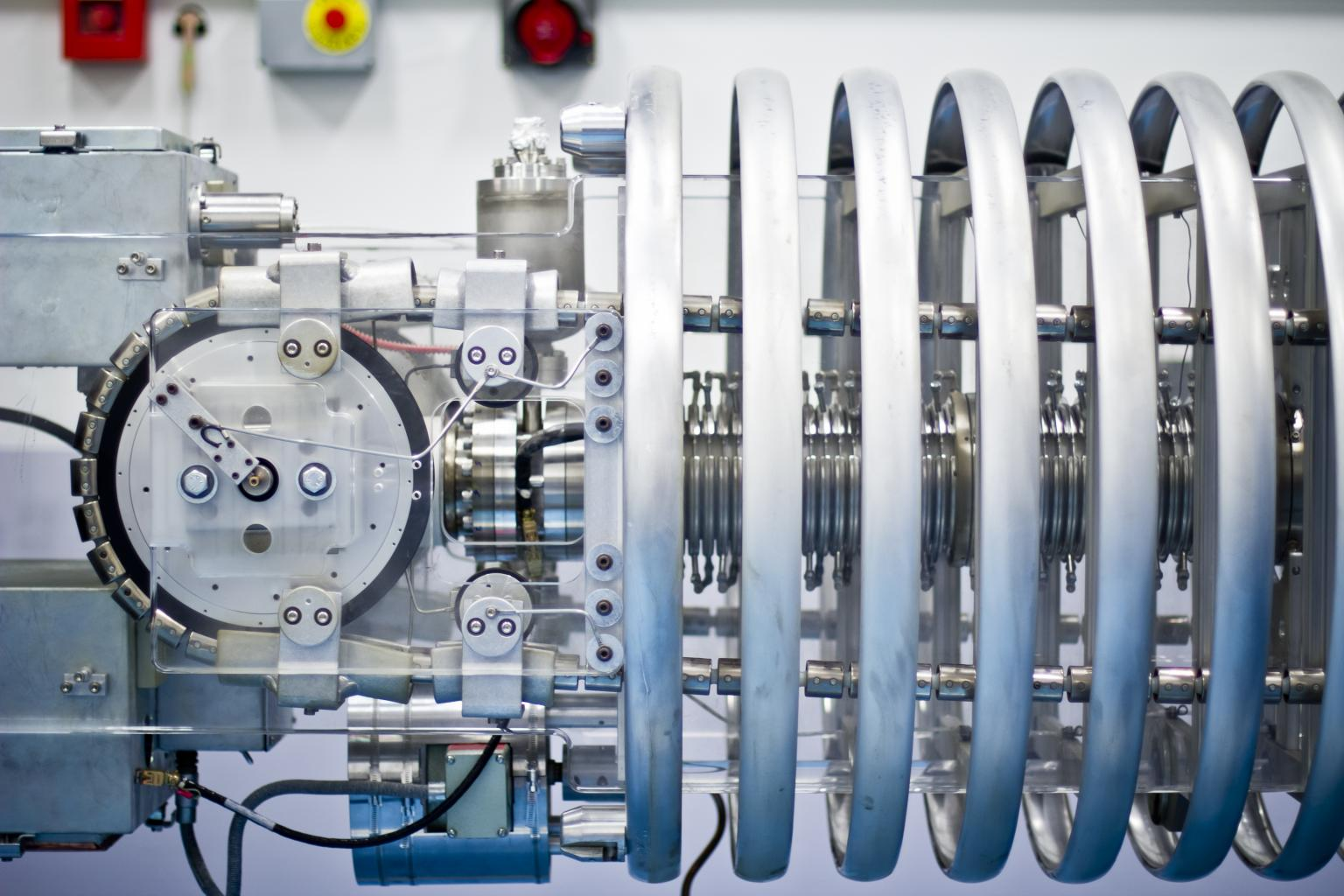
The 2.5 MeV Pelletron accelerator SIRIUS at the École polytechnique

A Pelletron is a type of electrostatic generator, structurally similar to a Van de Graaff generator. Pelletrons have been built in many sizes, from small units producing voltages up to 500 kilovolts (kV) and beam energies up to 1 megaelectronvolt (MeV) of kinetic energy, to the largest system, which has reached a DC voltage of over 25 megavolts and produced ion beams with energies over 900 MeV.

According to the review paper of F. Hinterberger the pelletron was first developed in the mid 1960s by Prof. Raymond Herb. In 1965 Ray together with J. A. Ferry and T. Pauly founded the National Electrostatics Corporation, to manufacture pelletrons as a solution to the problems of ever larger Van de Graaff machines required at that time for particle physic research.

As in the Van de Graaff machine, electric charge is moved by a mechanical transportation system. The charge is carried on a chain of 'pellets' (conductive tubes connected by links made of insulating material), that is used to build up high voltages on the Pelletron terminal. The moving pellets form variable capacitances on which charge is trapped, so as the pellet moves from the charging electrode towards the accumulator and the capacitance to ground reduces, the voltage rises, as charge cannot enter or leave the pellet except at the electrodes.

== Up and Down charging ==
While the pellets are in contact with the drive pulley or the top roller to encourage charge transfer, charged electrodes are brought very near to the pellets as they approach and leave the pulley /roller to maximise the charge transfer to the pellet. In a positive terminal Pelletron, the pellets pass under a negatively-charged inductor electrode just before they leave the drive pulley to maximise the effective positive charge on the pellets as they break contact with the grounded drive pulley. The most efficient arrangement, so called up and down charging has two non contact electrodes at each end (a positive 'suppressor' at the bottom near the downward pellets to limit the peak discharge current as they contact the pulley followed by a negative 'inductor' electrode on the upwards side to maximise the positive charge on the outbound pellet. At the top the situation is reversed, so at top roller, the arriving pellets experience the field of a negatively charged plate, and the departing ones a positively charged one, again to maximise charge transfer to the roller and top electrode.

The system is enclosed by a pressure vessel filled with insulating gas, such as SF_{6} (sulfur hexafluoride), and an evacuated beamline. The potential difference between the terminal and ground is used to accelerate several kinds of particles, such as positrons, electrons, and negative and positive ions.

Compared to the belt of Van de Graaff generator, the pellet chain can operate at a higher velocity than a rubber belt, without wear creating dust and stoppages, while producing higher voltages and currents. The chain can be charged more uniformly than the belt of a Van de Graaff, so the terminal voltage and therefore particle accelerator energy is more consistent. Large pelletron designs can typically produce a DC Voltage of several tens of MV.

Pelletron particle accelerators are used in many fields, including materials analysis, nuclear physics, semiconductor development and production, pharmaceutical research, and in ultra-sensitive mass spectrometers for carbon dating and measurement of other rare isotopes.

An electrically identical but mechanically different system is the Laddertron, so named because of the physical resemblance to an articulated ladder. In effect it is two parallel pelletron chains with adjacent pellets being bridged by metal tubes, giving a greater surface area for storing charge without increasing the thickness of the chain. However, the chain is heavier, and cannot flex laterally which requires the length of linkages to be precisely matched.
