= Academy of Technology =

College in West Bengal

- Combined image of the logos of academy of technology before 2013 and since 2013
- Other name: AOT
- Motto: 'Translate Your Vision Into Reality'
- Type: Private
- Established: 2003
- Academic affiliations: Maulana Abul Kalam Azad University of Technology
- Director: Dr. Dilip Bhattacharya (ECE)
- Faculty: 107
- Administrative staff: 40 (approx)
- Total staff: 150 (approx)
- Students: 2750 (approx)
- Location: Adisaptagram,Hooghly, Bandel (nearest city), West Bengal, 712121, India; 22.953108°N 88.377129°E
- Campus: 10.66 acres; Rural
- Approvals: AICTE
- Website: www.aot.edu.in

The Academy of Technology or AOT is a self-financed undergraduate engineering college in Adisaptagram, Hooghly, West Bengal, India. It was established in 2003 by "Ananda Educational Development and Charitable Organisation"(AEDCO), a trust. The college is affiliated to Maulana Abul Kalam Azad University of Technology and all the programmes are approved by the All India Council for Technical Education.

The campus is located on the side of G.T. road at Adisaptagram, Hooghly. The college is only 200 meters away from Adisaptagram railway station, next station to Bandel on Howrah–Barddhaman main line [Eastern Railway] and only 70 to 80 minutes journey from Howrah railway station. Kolkata Airport is only 69 km away.

Kanchrapara railway station (North 24 Parganas) is 9.4 KM and Kalyani railway station (Nadia) is 10.4 KM from Academy of Technology.

== Academics ==
The institute offers six B.Tech. courses along with five postgraduate courses:-

- B.Tech. in computer science and engineering (CSE) – 4 years [Approved intake – 180]
- B.Tech. in computer science and engineering and artificial intelligence/machine learning (CSE AIML) – 4 years [Approved intake – 60]
- B.Tech. in computer science and business system (CSBS) – 4 years [Approved intake – 60]
- B.Tech. in electronics and communication engineering (ECE) – 4 years [Approved intake – 180]
- B.Tech. in electrical and electronics engineering (EEE) – 4 years [Approved intake – 60]
- B.Tech. in electrical engineering (EE) – 4 years [Approved intake – 60]
- B.Tech. in mechanical engineering (ME) – 4 years [Approved intake – 60]
- Master's degree in Computer Applications (M.C.A.) – 2 years [Approved intake – 60]

== See also ==
- List of institutions of higher education in West Bengal
