= National Electrostatics Corporation =

Company based in Wisconsin, USA

The National Electrostatics Corporation (NEC), a company based in Wisconsin, USA, produces particle accelerators and associated equipment. The firm incorporated in 1965 under the leadership of Raymond Herb, and as of 2010 had a workforce of approximately 105 people.

NEC's linear accelerators range in voltage from a few kilovolts to a 25 Megavolt machine at Oak Ridge National Laboratory - the highest-voltage accelerator in the world as of 2010.
