= HVEC =

HVEC is an acronym that may refer to:

- High Voltage Engineering Corporation, an American manufacturer
- hveC, a human protein receptor for poliovirus
