= William T. Van de Graaff =

American football player and coach (1895–1977)

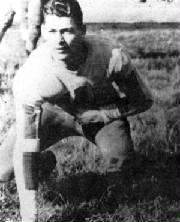

Biographical details
- Born: October 25, 1895; Tuscaloosa, Alabama, U.S.
- Died: April 26, 1977 (aged 81); Colorado Springs, Colorado, U.S.

Playing career
- 1913–1915: Alabama
- Position: Tackle

Coaching career (HC unless noted)
- 1921–1925: Alabama (assistant)
- 1926–1939: Colorado College

Head coaching record
- Overall: 49–54–6

Accomplishments and honors

Awards
- Second-team All-American (1915); 2× All-Southern (1914, 1915); Associated Press Southeast Area All-Time football team 1869-1919 era

William Travis "Bully" Van de Graaff (October 25, 1895 – April 26, 1977) was an American football player, coach, and college athletics administrator. He attended Tuscaloosa High School. He played college football at the University of Alabama, where he was selected as an All-American in 1915, Alabama's first. He was 6'1" and 187 pounds. "Bully" was placed on an Associated Press Southeast Area All-Time football team 1869-1919 era. Van de Graaff served as the head football coach at Colorado College from 1926 to 1939, compiling a record of 49–54–6. He coached hall of famer Dutch Clark. He died in Colorado Springs, Colorado, on April 26, 1977, at the age of 81. He was the older brother of physicist Robert J. Van de Graaff, the designer of the Van de Graaff generator which produces high voltages. William's two older brothers, Hargrove and Adrian, were also Alabama football players.

== Head coaching record ==
Year	Team	Overall	Conference	Standing	Bowl/playoffs
Colorado College Tigers (Rocky Mountain Conference) (1926–1939)
1926	Colorado College	5–2	5–2	T–3rd	
1927	Colorado College	6–2	5–2	3rd	
1928	Colorado College	5–3	5–3	5th	
1929	Colorado College	4–3	4–3	7th	
1930	Colorado College	2–4–2	2–4–2	9th	
1931	Colorado College	4–4	4–3	6th	
1932	Colorado College	5–2	5–2	3rd	
1933	Colorado College	2–5–1	2–4–1	8th	
1934	Colorado College	1–7	1–6	T–9th	
1935	Colorado College	4–3–1	4–2–1	T–5th	
1936	Colorado College	3–4–1	3–4	T–7th	
1937	Colorado College	5–4	3–3	6th	
1938	Colorado College	1–6	1–1	T–3rd	
1939	Colorado College	2–5–1	0–3	5th	
Colorado College:		49–54–6	44–42–4		
Total:		49–54–6			
