= Robert J. Van de Graaff =

American physicist (1901–1967)

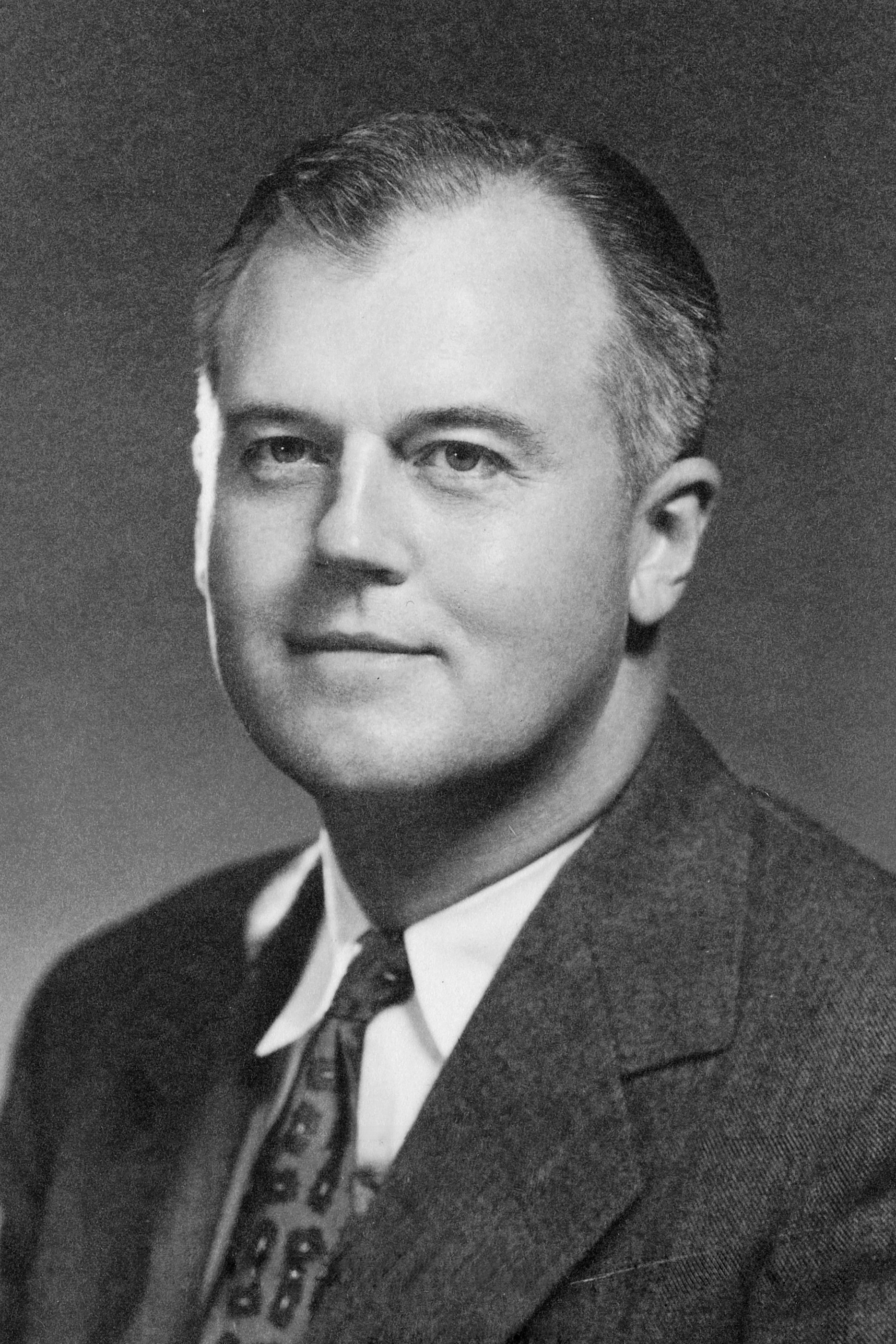
- Van de Graaff, c. 1950
- Born: Robert Jemison Van de Graaff; December 20, 1901; Tuscaloosa, Alabama, U.S.
- Died: January 16, 1967 (aged 65); Boston, Massachusetts, U.S.
- Education: University of Alabama: B.S., Mechanical Engineering; M.S., Mechanical Engineering; University of Oxford: BSc, Physics; DPhil, Physics
- Known for: Van de Graaff generator
- Spouse: Catherine Boyden (m. 1936)
- Children: 2
- Relatives: Robert Jemison Jr. (maternal great-grandfather); Adrian Van de Graaff (brother); Hargrove Van de Graaff (brother); William T. Van de Graaff (brother)
- Awards: Elliott Cresson Medal (1936); Duddell Medal and Prize (1947); Tom W. Bonner Prize (1966)
- Scientific career
- Fields: Physics
- Workplaces: Princeton University; Massachusetts Institute of Technology
- Doctoral advisor: J. S. E. Townsend
- Doctoral students: John G. Trump

Robert Jemison Van de Graaff (Note: Despite variant spellings in some authorities, the subject published only as "Van de Graaff." This Americanized form (capital "Van," double "f") differs from Dutch conventions. The AIP style guide uses "Van de Graaff", as do obituaries.) (December 20, 1901 – January 16, 1967) was an American physicist and inventor. He is best known for developing the Van de Graaff generator, a high-voltage electrostatic machine that became a fundamental tool in nuclear physics research.

Raised in Tuscaloosa, Alabama, Van de Graaff earned his DPhil degree at Oxford as a Rhodes Scholar. In Europe, lectures by Marie Curie and Ernest Rutherford encouraged him to develop methods for accelerating particles to nuclear energies. He built his first electrostatic generator at Princeton University in 1929 and demonstrated a 1.5-million-volt model in 1931, more than twice the highest direct current voltage previously achieved. After joining the Massachusetts Institute of Technology he constructed the 5-megavolt Round Hill generator. He collaborated with John G. Trump, his former student, on creating compact, gas-insulated machines, which became the first accelerators used in clinical medicine. During World War II, he directed development of high-voltage X-ray equipment for the U.S. Navy.

A high school football injury, aggravated by wartime overwork and later accidents, left Van de Graaff with chronic health problems in his later career. Nevertheless, in 1946 he joined Trump and Denis M. Robinson in organizing the High Voltage Engineering Corporation (HVEC), the first company to manufacture particle accelerators. As Chief Scientist, he guided development of commercial accelerators. In the 1950s, he invented the insulating-core transformer and was instrumental in commercializing HVEC's tandem accelerators. By 1967, more than 500 high-voltage Van de Graaff generators were operating worldwide, and HVEC had installed accelerators in hospitals and labs in 30 countries. He received the Tom W. Bonner Prize in 1966 for his contributions to electrostatic accelerator development.

== Early life and education ==
Robert Jemison Van de Graaff was born on December 20, 1901, at the Jemison–Van de Graaff Mansion in Tuscaloosa, Alabama, the youngest of four sons of Minnie Cherokee (née Jemison) and Adrian Sebastian Van de Graaff. The family had deep roots in Alabama: his great-grandfather was Robert Jemison Jr., a slaveholder planter and former state senator, and his father, a circuit judge, had been a substitute on Yale's first 11-man football team. The elder Van de Graaff became a professor of law at the University of Alabama in 1891.

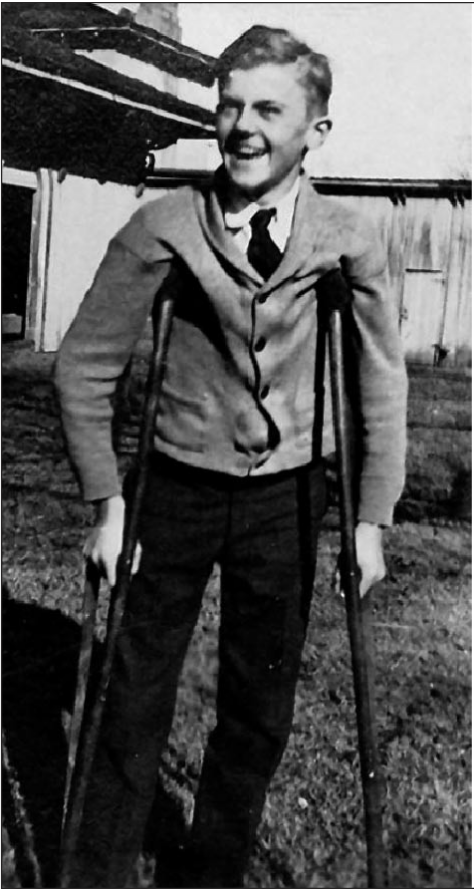
Quarterback injuries, age 15

Van de Graaff's three older brothers—Adrian, Hargrove, and William—became celebrated football players for the Alabama Crimson Tide, and William became Alabama's first All-American player in 1915. Robert intended to follow them: as a sophomore at Tuscaloosa High School, he played quarterback on the team coached by his brother Adrian. However, in the fall of 1917, during his senior year, he suffered a severe injury while playing, breaking his femur and severely injuring his back. He spent the rest of his senior year recuperating in the mansion, reading books about engines to pass the time, and never graduated from high school.

Despite his injuries, Van de Graaff enrolled at the University of Alabama in the fall of 1918, remaining on crutches for much of his freshman year. He joined the "Scrubs" (reserve team), coached by his brothers Adrian and Hargrove after their return from World War I, and played left end in games against Georgia Tech and Mississippi A&M. But he came to realize he would not match his brothers' athletic achievements. Years later, he recalled that a young woman asked how football was going, he replied, "It's not my game." She asked, "Well, Robert, what is your game?" He later recounted this as a life-changing moment that redirected him toward science.

In February 1921, Van de Graaff petitioned with eleven other students to become charter members of the University of Alabama's Theta Tau engineering fraternity. He became studious and made the honor roll for the first time. His lifelong nickname, "Tee," derived from his habit of drinking tea to stay alert while studying all night before exams. During summers, he worked on steamboats navigating the Black Warrior River, cultivating an interest in engines.

Van de Graaff received his Bachelor of Science (1922) and Master of Science (1923) degrees in Mechanical Engineering from the University of Alabama. For his master's degree thesis, he developed an improved system for mining lower grades of iron ore, in which ore moved on a conveyor belt and the more ferromagnetic components were extracted by a high magnetic field at a sharp metallic tip—a concept that anticipated aspects of his later inventions. After graduation, he worked for a year at the Alabama Power Company as a research assistant, where he observed that hydroelectric generators could operate with much larger gaps in their magnetic circuits than he had believed possible. This observation that would later inform his invention of the insulating core transformer.

=== Studies in Europe ===
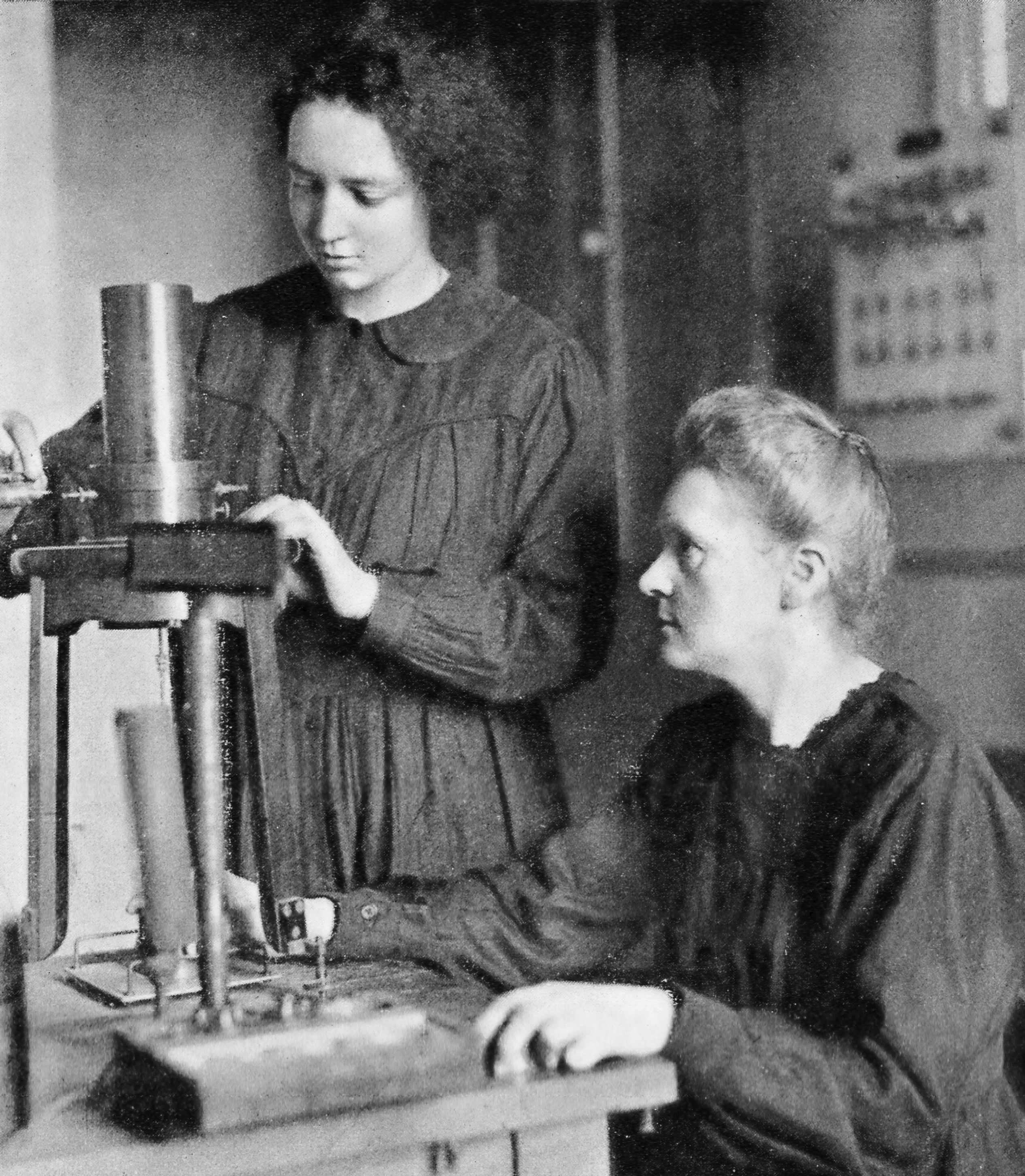
Marie Curie's lectures, in which Irène Curie demonstrated particle decay, sparked Van de Graaff's experimental interests.

With a grant from the state of Alabama, Van de Graaff traveled to France in 1924 to study at the University of Paris. There he attended lectures by Marie Curie on radioactivity and became fascinated by the clicks of individual alpha particles detected by a Geiger counter—an experience he later cited as inspiring his life's work. At the Sorbonne, Van de Graaff realized that atomic nuclei are electrically charged, therefore electrostatic high voltages could accelerate particles over the nuclear potential barrier and into the nucleus.

In 1925, Van de Graaff won a Rhodes Scholarship to The Queen's College at the University of Oxford. At Oxford, Van de Graaff studied physics under J. S. E. Townsend and felt intimidated by the erudition of his colleagues, who typically spoke three languages fluently. He continued to participate in sports despite his leg injury, playing lacrosse and receiving a "blue" in rowing. He earned a second Bachelor of Science in 1926 and a Doctor of Philosophy in 1928.

While at Oxford, Van de Graaff had his first extended opportunity to discuss accelerator physics with a peer. In 1926, he shared a room for a week at Leiden University with J. Robert Oppenheimer, then also a graduate student. The two talked late into the night, Oppenheimer about theoretical aspects of proton scattering and Van de Graaff about possibilities for electrostatic accelerators.

Van de Graaff later read Ernest Rutherford's 1927 anniversary address to the Royal Society, in which Rutherford expressed his ambition "to have available... a copious supply of atoms and electrons... transcending in energy the alpha and beta particles from radioactive substances." According to Van de Graaff, this address increased his conviction that an approach to generating high voltages was needed for progress in nuclear research.

== Career ==
=== Princeton (1929–1931) ===
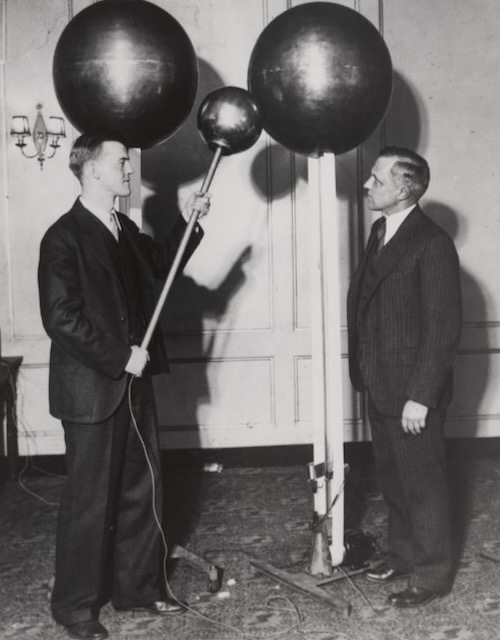
Van de Graaff demonstrates his generator in Nov. 1931

In September 1929, Van de Graaff returned to the United States as a National Research Fellow at Princeton University, expressly to develop a high-voltage source. That fall, he built a rudimentary proof-of-concept from "a tin can, a silk ribbon, and a small motor, at no expense." This simple model could sustain 80 kV, limited by discharge from the can's edges. With encouragement from Karl Compton, head of the physics department, he developed this concept further.

On March 20, 1931, after a sleepless night and many preliminary drafts, Van de Graaff wrote to Compton outlining his vision for the scientific applications of his generator. He predicted that proton bombardment of uranium might precipitate disintegration or that "the proton would be captured by the nucleus, thus opening up the possibility of creating new elements of atomic number greater than 92"—eight years before the first transuranium element was synthesized. In the same letter, he predicted the nuclear reaction that would result from proton bombardment of lithium. (Note: Van de Graaff later confided to colleagues that he had wanted to include in the letter his belief that useful amounts of nuclear energy might be liberated by the disintegration of uranium or thorium, but "felt Compton would think this too bold.") One year later, John Cockcroft and Ernest Walton demonstrated this reaction, for which they received the 1951 Nobel Prize in Physics.

Van de Graaff built a larger demonstration model with $100 (equivalent to $2,117 in 2025) in department funds. By November 1931, the model was producing more than 1.5 million volts—more than twice the highest direct current voltage previously achieved. He publicly demonstrated this device at the inaugural dinner of the American Institute of Physics, with Compton at his side as he "nervously explained the principles of his invention." Van de Graaff observed that, paired with a discharge tube yet to be designed, his device offered a "powerful means for the investigation of the atomic nucleus and other fundamental problems."

The demonstration prompted rapid adoption of the design. Merle Tuve, who was developing acceleration tubes with Lawrence Hafstad and Odd Dahl at the Department of Terrestrial Magnetism (DTM) of the Carnegie Institution, immediately borrowed Van de Graaff's machine and drove it to Washington DC. By October 1931, the DTM group had tested the generator to 800 kV and begun constructing a larger unit; by November 1932, their improved machine became the first Van de Graaff accelerator used in nuclear experiments. At the University of Wisconsin, graduate student Ray Herb began work on a pressurized Van de Graaff in 1933. Westinghouse Research Laboratories later constructed a 4-megavolt pressurized unit.

=== Massachusetts Institute of Technology (1931–1960) ===
==== Round Hill generator ====
When Compton became president of the Massachusetts Institute of Technology in 1930, he arranged for Van de Graaff to join MIT as a research associate in 1931. With support from Compton and a grant from the Research Corporation, Van de Graaff and his associates—including physicists Lester C. Van Atta and Chester M. Van Atta—undertook construction of a much larger, air-insulated generator. Compton arranged for the project to be housed in a former airship hangar at the Round Hill estate of Colonel E. H. R. Green in South Dartmouth, Massachusetts. Van de Graaff hoped the machine would be the first to artificially split the atom, but John Cockcroft and Ernest Walton accomplished the feat with a voltage multiplier circuit in 1932, while the Round Hill generator was still under construction.

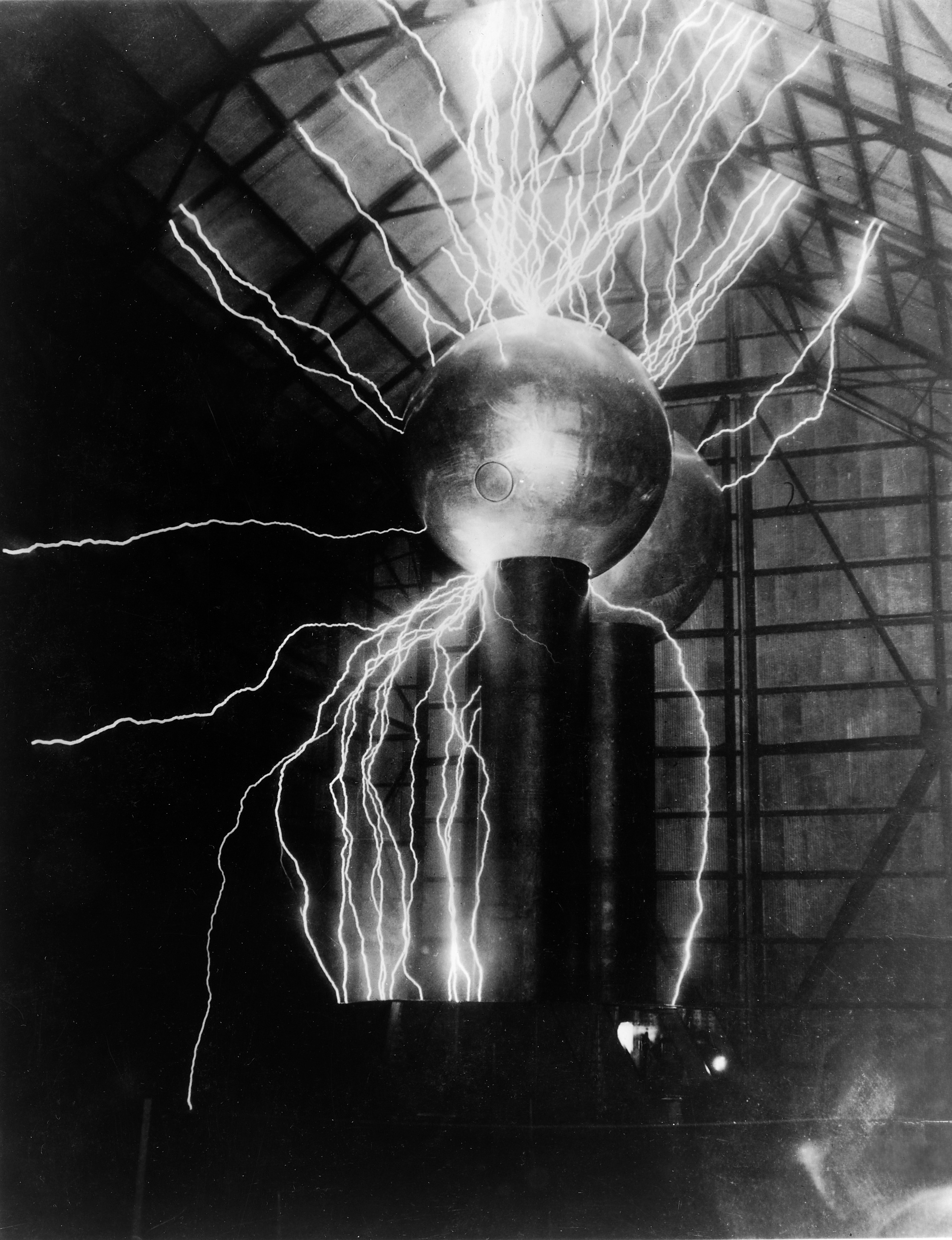
The 43 ft (13 m)-tall Round Hill generator

On November 28, 1933, the first full-scale test produced sparks 12 m (40 ft) long for an audience of scientists and journalists. In March 1934, Nikola Tesla wrote a cover story on the generator for Scientific American, observing that it represented "a distinct advance over its predecessors," which included his own Tesla coil.

The Round Hill site proved difficult for sustained research. Designed to reach 10 megavolts, the generator achieved only 5.1 megavolts due to problems with air insulation; humidity, salt fog, and contamination on the terminal spheres caused electrical breakdown. No nuclear experiments were completed at Round Hill, in part because it took nearly four years to design an acceleration tube that could control a particle beam. D. Allan Bromley later concluded that "although performance of the Round Hill generator was disappointing to Van de Graaff the experience gained with this machine was invaluable to later designs."

In 1934, Van de Graaff was appointed Associate Professor of Physics at MIT, a position he held until 1960. In 1935, Van de Graaff received a patent for his electrostatic generator, following what he described as "an arduous but effective siege of writing" with guidance from Vannevar Bush. Following Colonel Green's death in 1936, Round Hill closed, and the generator was moved to the MIT campus in 1937, where it was completely redesigned. The reconfigured machine operated at lower but more stable voltages and incorporated one of the first remote control systems for high-voltage equipment. The generator remains operational and on permanent display at the Boston Museum of Science.

In 1936, Van de Graaff married Catherine Boyden. The couple had two sons, John and William.

==== Early applications ====
Around 1931, at Bush's suggestion, Van de Graaff began collaborating with John G. Trump, then a doctoral student in electrical engineering. This collaboration lasted until Van de Graaff's death. Together they explored applications beyond nuclear physics. Van de Graaff developed ideas for high-voltage DC power transmission; Trump's dissertation showed that a vacuum-insulated line could transmit a gigawatt over 1,600 km (1,000 mi) with only 2.5 percent energy loss. Trump also pioneered medical uses of the generator: in 1937, Harvard's Huntington Memorial Hospital approved construction of a mega-volt X-ray generator for cancer treatment, the first use of an electrostatic accelerator in clinical medicine.

Van de Graaff and Trump's research generated patenting activity that later historians have identified as an important precedent in university technology transfer. Because Van de Graaff had developed his ideas across multiple institutions, the Research Corporation organized a three-way agreement in 1933 among Princeton, MIT, and the National Research Council to secure clear title to his patents. The power transmission concept attracted interest from the Tennessee Valley Authority, which in 1933 considered funding MIT $250,000 to develop the technology for hydropower transmission. However, the project stalled amid uncertainties about the technology and disagreements over the patent terms.

Over the next decade, Van de Graaff's patents attracted much industrial interest, but no commercial results. General Electric, Picker X-ray Corporation, and Westinghouse each pursued licenses, yet negotiations failed. Large firms demanded exclusive rights to justify their investment, while MIT's 1932 patent policy, which treated licensing as a public trust, made the university reluctant to grant them.

==== World War II radiography ====
Van de Graaff machines were widely used for wartime science and production. In 1940, a 2 MV machine originally destined for a Philadelphia hospital was requisitioned for the Manhattan Project and sent to Chicago for Enrico Fermi's work on the nuclear pile. Shortly after the United States entered World War II, Van de Graaff volunteered for war-related work and was appointed Director of the High Voltage Radiographic Project at MIT. He directed the development of high-voltage X-ray equipment for industrial and military radiography, including the examination of heavy ordnance for the U.S. Navy. His laboratory built five 2 MV X-ray generators, sold to the Navy at $100,000 each. The U.S. Navy recognized Van de Graaff and eight of his associates with Naval Ordnance Development Awards.

The combination of wartime work and his old football injury caused a breakdown in Van de Graaff's health that lasted for several years after the war. His physical difficulties were compounded by further misfortune: an operation in the 1940s or 1950s left him with hepatitis from a contaminated blood transfusion. In the 1950s he was severely injured in an automobile accident, breaking his legs again. According to his son, the cumulative injuries were so severe that Van de Graaff spent much of his later life working from a bed, maintaining one in his office and another at home. A colleague later wrote that Van de Graaff "bore this difficult period with uncomplaining courage and optimism," but that he "sank in all but name very much into the background, as the exciting events of physics unfolded in the years immediately following the war."

==== ONR generator ====
After recovering his health, Van de Graaff collaborated with William W. Buechner on the construction of a 12 MV electrostatic generator in Building 58 during the 1948–1952 period. Under Buechner's direction, this facility conducted a substantial fraction of all precision nuclear spectroscopy accomplished during its operating lifetime.

=== High Voltage Engineering Corporation (1946–1967) ===
By 1946, Van de Graaff's original generator patent had only six years remaining before expiration, with no royalties yet generated. Failure to license the patent set the stage for a new idea: a university spin-off.

Trump proposed forming a new company to manufacture and sell electrostatic accelerators. In late 1946, he co-founded the High Voltage Engineering Corporation (HVEC) with Van de Graaff and Denis Robinson. Trump served as Technical Director and Chairman of the Board, Robinson as President, and Van de Graaff as Chief Scientist. The American Research and Development Corporation, a pioneer of institutional venture capital, provided the company's initial funding; Van de Graaff held a 13 percent equity stake. HVEC was the first company organized with the express purpose of manufacturing particle accelerators. Van de Graaff came to believe he could contribute more effectively to nuclear physics by improving accelerator technology than by conducting experiments himself.

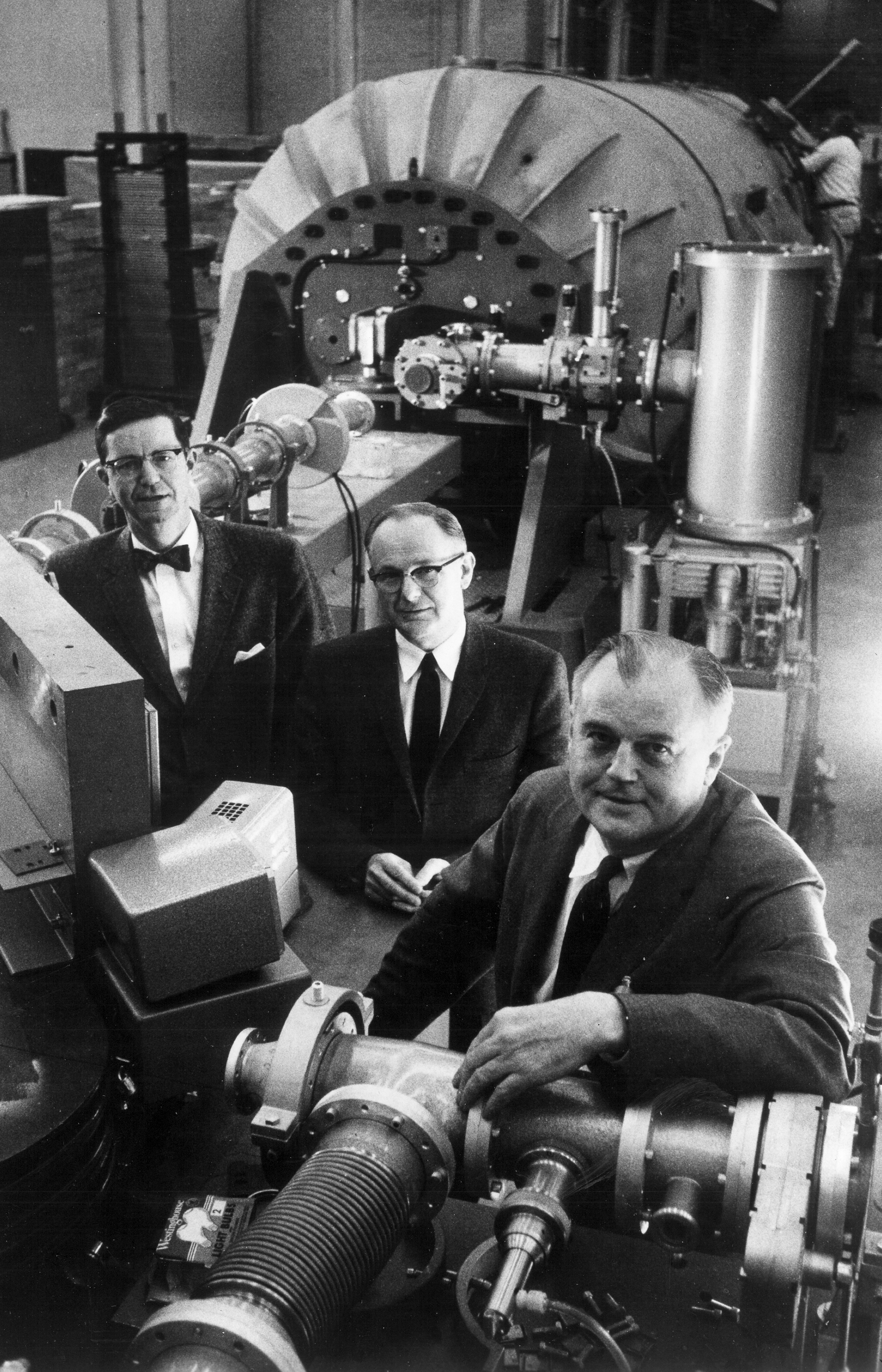
Van de Graaff with Trump, Robinson, and the first tandem model

In the early 1950s, Van de Graaff recognized that single-ended accelerators could not readily exceed six million volts and became an advocate for tandem accelerators. Although the tandem principle was not new, Van de Graaff persuaded HVEC to develop commercial machines. In 1956, the Chalk River Laboratories ordered the first commercially produced tandem accelerator, the EN tandem. Over the next decade, HVEC developed four larger, higher-voltage models. Between 1958 and 1973, the company shipped 55 tandem accelerators to labs around the world.

In 1960, Van de Graaff resigned from MIT to become HVEC's full-time Chief Scientist. Within the company, colleagues regarded him as its "spiritual and scientific head." His technical ideas were recorded for years before his death to preserve what Robinson termed his "momentum." A research laboratory bearing his name, intended as a birthday present, was completed in 1967, the year he died.

Van de Graaff pressed for machines of ever-higher voltage, sometimes against the judgment of colleagues concerned with commercial viability. Robinson later described his managerial role as distinguishing between Van de Graaff's ideas that were "so far out one couldn't afford to back them financially" and those with realistic prospects. In the summer of 1966, Van de Graaff directed a test program that accelerated iodine ions to approximately 200 MeV using multiple stripping. He envisioned what he called a "nuclear soft landing"—projecting one uranium nucleus into another with just enough energy for the two to reach each other with minimal excitation.

By the time of his death, HVEC products were in use in physical research laboratories and hospitals in over 30 countries, with more than 500 generators operating worldwide.

== Inventions ==
=== Van de Graaff generator ===
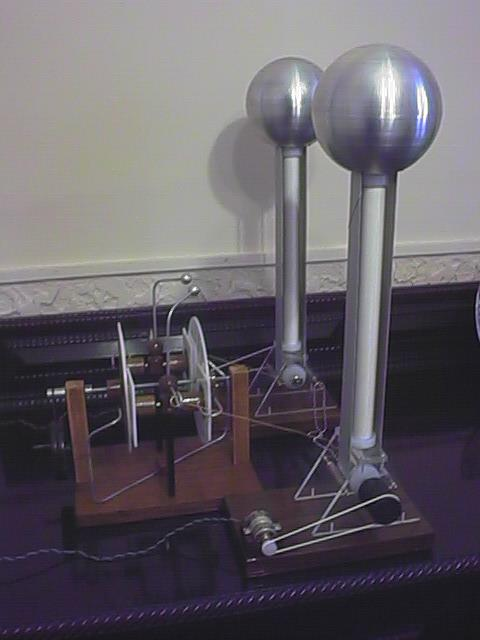
Replica of Van de Graaff's 1930 generator

Van de Graaff built his first working model at Princeton in 1929 using a tin can, a silk ribbon, and a small motor. The device produced 80 kV, limited by corona discharge from the edges of the can. In his search for suitable belt material, Van de Graaff visited local hat shops seeking pure silk; at one shop, he began "calmly setting fire to a sample to determine whether it was pure or 'loaded' with tin salts."

The generator works by using a motorized insulating belt to transport electrical charge to the interior of a hollow metal sphere; since charge resides on the outer surface, it accumulates to produce potentials far exceeding the source voltage. For instance, Van de Graaff's Round Hill generator used twin 4.6 m (15 ft) aluminum spheres mounted on 7.3 m (24 ft) insulating columns and achieved 5.1 megavolts between the terminals.

Over his life, Van de Graaff refined the generator to raise its voltage and make it commercially useful. Working with Trump and Buechner during World War II, Van de Graaff developed the uniform-field electrode configuration for acceleration tubes, which improved beam quality and made possible the construction of reliable multi-MeV machines. Later generators were enclosed in pressurized tanks filled with dielectric gases such as nitrogen or sulfur hexafluoride, which increased voltage capacity while reducing size.

Tandem Van de Graaff accelerators, which HVEC began to manufacture in 1958, use charge exchange to multiply particle energy. Negative ions are accelerated toward a positive high-voltage terminal, stripped of electrons to become positive ions, and then accelerated again as they exit. This configuration effectively doubles the energy obtained from a given terminal voltage. Van de Graaff regarded the tandem's commercial success as opening a new era for nuclear structure physics.

=== Insulating core transformer ===
In the late 1950s, Van de Graaff invented the insulating core transformer (ICT), which generates high-voltage direct current using magnetic flux rather than an electrostatic charging belt. (Note: Although Van de Graaff's patent uses "insulating," the device is also commonly called the "insulated core transformer". Both terms appear in the technical literature.) The concept drew on his observation decades earlier at the Alabama Power Company that efficient magnetic circuits could tolerate larger gaps than conventional engineering assumed. Van de Graaff considered this invention a greater effort than the original generator.

Van de Graaff filed for a patent on a single-phase ICT in 1957, which was granted in 1965. Roy Emanuelson, an engineer at High Voltage Engineering Corporation, improved the design with a three-phase version that proved commercially viable and patented it in 1966. When HVEC exited the accelerator business in 1983, the ICT technology was adopted by several successor firms, including Cryovac, Vivirad, Nissin-High Voltage, and Wasik Associates.

Where the Van de Graaff generator transports charge mechanically on a belt to build up electrostatic potential, the ICT steps up voltage through a series of magnetically coupled transformer stages, with rectifiers at each stage converting the output to direct current. This limits the ICT to voltages lower than 2.5 MeV but allows much higher beam currents than belt-charged machines can sustain. Because it could produce higher direct current at lower voltages, the ICT found applications in industrial radiation processing—primarily crosslinking wire and cable insulation, heat-shrinkable tubing, and food packaging films—and as a power source for larger tandem accelerators.

== Death ==
Van de Graaff's last public appearance was on October 5, 1966, at the dedication of the MP tandem accelerator at Yale University's Wright Nuclear Structure Laboratory. At the ceremony, he reminisced about his early experiences in Paris and his 1926 conversations with Robert Oppenheimer at Leiden about proton scattering and electrostatic accelerators.

On the morning of January 16, 1967, Van de Graaff suffered a fatal heart attack at his home in Lexington, Massachusetts. He died at Massachusetts General Hospital in Boston at the age of 65. He was survived by his wife Catherine and two sons, John and William.

After obituaries of Van de Graaff circulated widely, the progressive rock band Van der Graaf Generator adopted his technical contributions as their namesake (notwithstanding spelling errors).

Van de Graaff, a crater on the far side of the Moon, is named after him.

== Recognition ==
=== Memberships ===
Year	Organization	Type	Ref.
1934	American Physical Society	Fellow	
1935	American Academy of Arts and Sciences	Member	

=== Awards ===
Year	Organization	Award	Citation	Ref.
1936	Franklin Institute	Elliott Cresson Medal	—	
1945	U.S. Navy Bureau of Ordnance	Naval Ordnance Development Award	—	
1947	Institute of Physics	Duddell Medal and Prize	—	
1966	American Physical Society	Tom W. Bonner Prize	"For his contributions to and continued development of the electrostatic accelerator, a device that has immeasurably advanced nuclear physics."	

== Works ==
=== Journal articles ===
- Van de Graaff, Robert J. (1929). "The Mobility of Ions in Gases". Nature. 124 (3114): 10–11. Bibcode:1929Natur.124...10V. doi:10.1038/124010b0.
- Van de Graaff, Robert J. (1931). "A 1,500,000-volt Electrostatic Generator". Physical Review. Proceedings of the American Physical Society. 38: 1919–1920. doi:10.1103/PhysRev.38.1915.
- Van de Graaff, Robert J.; Compton, Karl T.; Van Atta, Lester C. (1933). "The Electrostatic Production of High Voltage for Nuclear Investigations". Physical Review. 43 (3): 149–157. Bibcode:1933PhRv...43..149V. doi:10.1103/PhysRev.43.149.
- Van Atta, Lester C.; Northrup, Doyle L.; Van Atta, Chester M.; Van de Graaff, Robert J. (1936). "The Design, Operation, and Performance of the Round Hill Electrostatic Generator". Physical Review. 49 (11): 761–776. Bibcode:1936PhRv...49..761V. doi:10.1103/PhysRev.49.761.
- Van Atta, Lester C.; Northrup, Doyle L.; Van de Graaff, Robert J.; Van Atta, Chester M. (1941). "Electrostatic Generator for Nuclear Research at M.I.T.". Review of Scientific Instruments. 12 (11): 534–545. doi:10.1063/1.1769794.
- Van de Graaff, Robert J.; Trump, John G.; Buechner, William W. (1947). "Electrostatic generators for the acceleration of charged particles". Reports on Progress in Physics. 11 301: 1–18. doi:10.1088/0034-4885/11/1/301.
- Trump, John G.; Van de Graaff, Robert J. (1948). "Irradiation of biological materials by high energy roentgen rays and cathode rays". Journal of Applied Physics. 19 (7): 599–604. Bibcode:1948JAP....19..599T. doi:10.1063/1.1698178.
- Van de Graaff, Robert J.; Trump, John G. (1949). "The secondary emission of electrons by high energy electrons". Physical Review. 75 (1): 44. Bibcode:1949PhRv...75...44T. doi:10.1103/PhysRev.75.44.
- Van de Graaff, Robert J. (1960). "Tandem Electrostatic Accelerators". Nuclear Instruments and Methods. 8 (2): 195–202. Bibcode:1960NucIM...8..195V. doi:10.1016/S0029-554X(60)80006-7.
- Van de Graaff, Robert J.; Rose, Peter H.; Wittkower, Andrew B. (1962). "High-Voltage Acceleration Tube Utilizing Inclined-Field Principles". Nature. 195 (4848): 1292–1293. Bibcode:1962Natur.195.1292V. doi:10.1038/1951292a0.

=== Patents ===
- US1,991,236 – "Electrostatic Generator" (1931)
- US2,024,957 – "Electrical Transmission System" (1932)
- US2,194,839A – "Method of and apparatus for electrostatically generating direct current power" (1937, with John G. Trump)
- US2,767,324A — "Apparatus for neutron detection" (1953)
- US2,945,141A — "Unidirectional high-voltage generator" (1956)
- US2,922,905 — "Apparatus For Reducing Electron Loading In Positive-Ion Accelerators" (1958)
- US3,187,208 – "High Voltage Electromagnetic Apparatus Having An Insulating Magnetic Core" (1961)
- US3,239,702 — "Multi-Disk Electromagnetic Power Machinery" (1960)
- US3,308,323 – "Inclined field High Voltage Vacuum Tubes" (1962)
- US3,323,069 – "High Voltage Electromagnetic Charged-Particle Accelerator Apparatus Having An Insulating Magnetic Core" (1965)

== Citations ==
- Bromley, D. Allan (1974). "The development of electrostatic accelerators". Nuclear Instruments and Methods. 122: 1–34. Bibcode:1974NucIM.122....1B. doi:10.1016/0029-554X(74)90468-6.
- Burchard, John Ely (1948). Q.E.D.: MIT in World War II. New York: J. Wiley & Sons; Chapman & Hall. OCLC 1625883.
- Burrill, E. Alfred (February 1967). "Van de Graaff, the man and his accelerators". Physics Today. 20 (2): 49–52. Bibcode:1967PhT....20b..49B. doi:10.1063/1.3034150.
- Compton, Karl T. (July 21, 1933). "High Voltage II". Science. 78 (2012): 48–52. Bibcode:1933Sci....78...48C. doi:10.1126/science.78.2012.48. JSTOR 1659380. PMID 17747672.
- Croswell, Ken (February 1990). "Lester C. Van Atta: From the Historian". IEEE Antennas and Propagation Society Newsletter. 32 (1): 25–26. doi:10.1109/MAP.1990.7725042.
- Fishman, Eliot (1996). MIT Patent Policy, 1932–1946: Historical Precedents in University-Industry Technology Transfer (Ph.D. dissertation). University of Pennsylvania. ProQuest 304300176.
- Furfari, F. A. Tony (January–February 2005). "A history of the Van de Graaff generator". IEEE Industry Applications Magazine. 11 (1): 10–14. Bibcode:2005IIAM...11a..10F. doi:10.1109/MIA.2005.1380320.
- Goldie, Charlie H.; Trump, John G. (November 1974). "Van de Graaff accelerators of the future". Nuclear Instruments and Methods. 122: 277–285. Bibcode:1974NucIM.122..277G. doi:10.1016/0029-554x(74)90488-1.
- Graham, M. Talmage; Young, James (November 2004). "Robert Jemison "Tee" Van de Graaff: From Football Fields to Electric Fields". The Physics Teacher. 42 (8): 463–467. Bibcode:2004PhTea..42..463G. doi:10.1119/1.1814319.
- Hellborg, Ragnar; Whitlow, Harry J. (2019). "History of electrostatic accelerators". The Electrostatic Accelerator: A versatile tool. Morgan & Claypool Publishers. doi:10.1088/2053-2571/aaea76ch3. ISBN 978-1-64327-356-3.
- Homan, Charles; Wolff, Michael (1969). "The Management Style of Denis M. Robinson". Innovation. No. 3. pp. 8–18.
- Lassman, Charles Thomas (2000). From quantum revolution to institutional transformation: Edward U. Condon and the dynamics of pure science in America, 1925–1951 (Thesis). Johns Hopkins University. ProQuest 304694847.
- Letournel, M. (2005). "Industrial Electron Accelerators". In Hellborg, Ragnar (ed.). Electrostatic Accelerators: Fundamentals and Applications. Particle Acceleration and Detection. Berlin: Springer. pp. 581–593. doi:10.1007/b138596. ISBN 978-3-540-23983-3.
- Metz, William D. (July 14, 1972). "High Voltage Engineering: Accelerating Away from Science". Science. 177 (4044): 151–153. Bibcode:1972Sci...177..151M. doi:10.1126/science.177.4044.151. JSTOR 1734822. PMID 17779910.
- Owens, Larry (1990). "MIT and the Federal "Angel": Academic R&D and Federal-Private Cooperation before World War II". Isis. 81 (2): 188–213. doi:10.1086/355334. JSTOR 233683.
- Pang, Alex Soojung-Kim (1990). "Edward Bowles and Radio Engineering at MIT, 1920–1940". Historical Studies in the Physical and Biological Sciences. 20 (2): 313–337. doi:10.2307/27757646. JSTOR 27757646.
- Rose, Peter H. (1968). "Robert Jemison Van de Graaff: In Memoriam". Nuclear Instruments and Methods. 60 (1): 1–3. doi:10.1016/0029-554X(68)90081-5.
- Schulz, Milford D (August 1975). "The Supervoltage Story". The American Journal of Roentgenology. 124 (4): 540–559. doi:10.2214/ajr.124.4.540.
- Wildes, Karl L.; Lindgren, Nilo A. (1985). "Chapter 10: The High-Voltage Research Laboratory: John G. Trump". A Century of Electrical Engineering and Computer Science at MIT, 1882-1982. Cambridge, MA: MIT Press. ISBN 978-0-262-29103-3.
- Windham, Ben (December 11, 2004). "Southern Lights: Robert Van de Graaff never received his due in Tuscaloosa". Tuscaloosa News.
