= Denis M. Robinson =

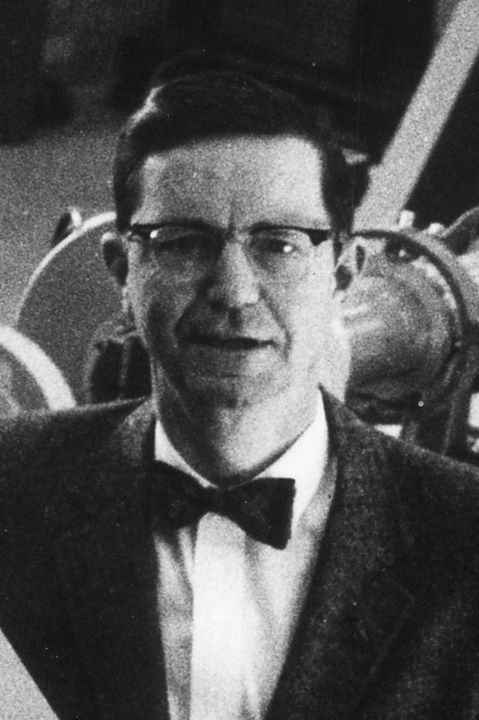
- Robinson c. 1958
- Born: Denis Morrell Robinson; November 19, 1907; Pirbright, Surrey, U.K.
- Died: August 25, 1994 (aged 86); Arlington, Massachusetts, U.S.
- Occupation: Businessman
- Known for: Crystal receivers Electrostatic particle accelerator
- Spouse: Alix Casagrande
- Children: 2
- Father: E.H. Robinson
- Awards: Order of the British Empire (1946); Fellow, American Academy of Arts and Sciences (1954); Member, National Academy of Engineering (1954)
- Scientific career
- Fields: Physics, electrical engineering
- Workplaces: Birmingham University; High Voltage Engineering Corporation

Denis Morrell Robinson (19 November 1907 – 25 August 1994) was a British-American electrical engineer and entrepreneur. He served as founding president of High Voltage Engineering Corporation, a leading manufacturer of particle accelerators. His earlier academic work on crystal receivers helped lay groundwork for semiconductor electronics, and he made contributions to radar development as British liaison to the MIT Radiation Laboratory.

== Early life and education ==
Robinson was born in Pirbright, Surrey, the son of Captain E.H. Robinson. He received his B.Sc.(Eng.) from King's College London in 1928 and his Ph.D. from the University of London in 1930. He also received industrial training at Siemens and Metropolitan-Vickers.

From 1929 to 1931, he attended the Massachusetts Institute of Technology on a Harkness Fellowship, studying dielectric properties of glass under Vannevar Bush.

== Career ==
Robinson initially worked at Callendar's Cable. In the late 1930s, Robinson worked at Scophony Television Laboratory on audio and video electronics for commercial television.

In December 1939, he joined the Air Ministry's Telecommunications Research Establishment (TRE), where he became responsible for British work on crystal receivers for centimeter-wave radar. After finding Hans Hollmann's German text asserting that crystal rectifiers made superior microwave detectors, Robinson initiated the British crystal receiver program. (Note: In a 1991 interview with John Bryant, Robinson recalled the author as Alfred Thoma. Bryant, reviewing Henry Guerlac's records, determined the book was actually by Hans Hollmann.) Working with physicist Herbert W.B. Skinner, Robinson developed silicon-tungsten crystal detectors. By July 1940, Skinner had devised a method to seal these crystals in glass envelopes for use in flight trials. This work marked a return to semiconductor technology that vacuum tubes had largely displaced, and would shape postwar electronics research.

In August and September 1940, Robinson participated in the Tizard Mission, which shared British radar secrets with the United States. The following year, he was assigned to the MIT Radiation Laboratory as resident British liaison officer, a position he held from 1941 to 1945. His family had already relocated to the Boston area after a German bomb nearly destroyed their home in Swanage. At the Radiation Laboratory, Robinson advocated successfully for American development of microwave air-to-surface-vessel radar for submarine detection.

During his time in the Rad Lab, Robinson also promoted adoption of British crystal detector technology, catalyzing research programs at Bell Labs, Westinghouse, Sylvania, Purdue University, and the University of Pennsylvania. The semiconductor research programs Robinson helped initiate, particularly work on silicon purification and doping, contributed to the foundation for the transistor, developed at Bell Labs in 1947. Robert Buderi credits Robinson's effort with starting American laboratories "fortuitously down the semiconductor path."

In August 1944, Robinson was appointed to the chair of electrical engineering at the University of Birmingham.

=== High Voltage Engineering Corporation ===
Robinson returned to the U.S. in May 1946, where he and his Rad Lab colleague John Trump began work on electrostatic generator in the Rad Lab's Building 24 garage. In 1946, he co-founded High Voltage Engineering Corporation with Trump and Robert J. Van de Graaff to manufacture Van de Graaff particle accelerators. Initially capitalized by the American Research and Development Corporation, the company grew from 20 employees operating in a Harvard Square garage to a 900-employee enterprise by 1969. Robinson served as president from 1946 to 1970 and as board chairman from 1970 to 1980.

As president, Robinson transformed HVEC from 20 employees in a garage to a $21 million enterprise employing 935 people by 1969. Robinson's management style centered on balancing the competing demands of Van de Graaff's scientific ambitions, Trump's technical direction, and commercial viability. Colleagues described him as "interpreter, translator, arbiter, balance wheel" among the company's founding triumvirate. He maintained customer relationships with customer agencies, universities, and foreign laboratories that provided half the company's business

HVEC bet heavily on a transuranium accelerator, which produced a company financial crisis in 1970 when the federal government refused to purchase it. Robinson orchestrated the company's diversification into industrial products while preserving its research accelerator division. HVEC, which had made scientific instruments, became a miniconglomerate where accelerator-enabled industrial products were the source of 80 percent of sales.

=== Board service ===
Robinson later served as board chairman of the Marine Biological Laboratory at Woods Hole, Massachusetts, from 1971 to 1977, and as honorary chairman thereafter.

== Publications ==
Robinson's early publications included a paper on the unpolarised resistivity of glass, arising from his research at MIT and a monograph entitled High Voltage Cables (1935), based on his work at Callender's Cable Company.

== Recognition ==
Robinson was appointed Officer of the Order of the British Empire on 13 June 1946.

In 1954, was elected a Fellow of the American Academy of Arts and Sciences. He served as the academy's secretary from 1970 to 1973.

In 1967, he was elected to the United States National Academy of Engineering.

He received the Distinguished Service Award from the Woods Hole Marine Biological Laboratory in 1986.

== Personal life ==
Robinson married Alix Casagrande, a sculptor and painter, in 1932. He died in Arlington, Massachusetts, on 25 August 1994. Colleagues remembered him as "a much-admired, soft-spoken leader."
