= Round Hill generator =

Experimental Van de Graaff generator

Coordinates: 41.5396°N 70.9306°W

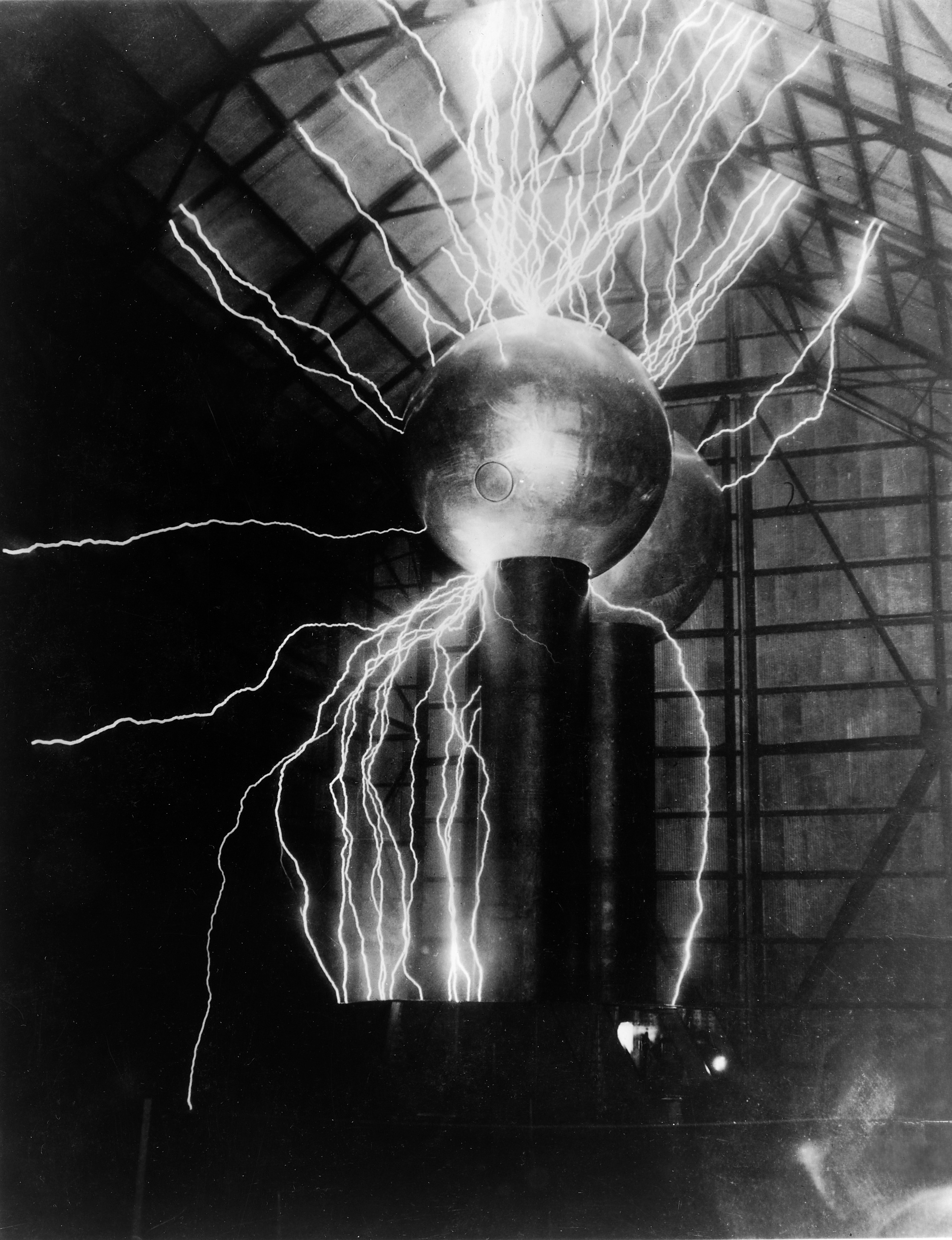
- Streamers on the Round Hill generator
- Uses: Splitting the atom; high-voltage research
- Inventor: Robert J. Van de Graaff
- Related items: Van de Graaff generator

The Round Hill generator is an experimental high-voltage Van de Graaff generator built at Round Hill, Massachusetts. When constructed in 1933, it was designed as the world's most powerful particle accelerator. The generator is now used at the Boston Museum of Science for educational demonstrations.

The instrument was constructed by a Massachusetts Institute of Technology (MIT) team led by physicist Robert J. Van de Graaff, who hoped to be the first scientist to artificially split the atom. They completed construction a year after John Cockroft and Ernest Walton accomplished the feat in 1932. The machine was the forerunner of high-voltage electrostatic particle accelerators built by the High Voltage Engineering Corporation, which Van de Graaff and his student John G. Trump introduced to cancer clinics and nuclear physics labs around the world.

Too large to fit in a research lab, the 43-foot-tall generator was assembled in Round Hill's airship hangar. Originally, a technician ran the machine from within one of its metal terminals, which acted as a Faraday cage. It was first demonstrated to the public in November 1933 and dubbed an "electrical Niagara" by The New York Times because of its copious electrical discharges. Coverage in Time, Science, and a review by Nikola Tesla in Scientific American brought fame to its inventor. Designed to reach potentials of 10 megavolts, challenges with air insulation limited the accelerator to 5.1 megavolts.

When the research program at Round Hill ended in 1936, the generator was overhauled and installed on MIT's campus in Cambridge, Massachusetts. After two decades of research use at MIT, the Round Hill generator was moved to the Boston Museum of Science in 1955, where it remains operational in the "Theater of Electricity" exhibition.

== History ==
=== Origins of the Van de Graaff generator ===
The development of Van de Graaff's high-voltage generators began through his graduate studies in Europe, where he encountered many leading physicists of the era. In 1924, Van de Graaff attended radioactivity lectures by Marie Curie. Her use of a clicking Geiger counter and loudspeaker to detect alpha particles captivated Van de Graaff, and he resolved to find ways to study "individual particles" rather than statistical thermodynamics. During a brief stay at the Leiden University, he was encouraged to pursue methods to artificially accelerate particles through conversations with his roommate, Robert Oppenheimer. At Oxford, Van de Graaff was influenced by Ernest Rutherford's 1927 anniversary address to the Royal Society, in which Rutherford expressed his "long-standing ambition to have available...a copious supply of atoms and electrons...transcending in energy the alpha and beta particles from radioactive substances."

Van de Graaff proposed a simple, inexpensive technique to generating high voltages with electrostatics: attract electrons to a belt, collect them in a metal terminal, then accelerate them towards a target. In 1929, while a National Research Fellow at Princeton University, he constructed a prototype generator, a rudimentary device built from "a tin can, a silk ribbon and a small motor, at no expense." This prototype achieved 80,000 volts but had a fundamental limitation: sharp edges on the tin can created electric field concentrations that caused corona discharge, a form of electrical breakdown that prevented higher voltages.

At Princeton, Van de Graaff found a champion for his research in physics department chair Karl Taylor Compton, who saw the generator's potential for particle physics. Compton was following parallel particle accelerator projects at the University of Cambridge, where John Cockcroft and Ernest Walton were developing voltage multiplier circuits, and at the University of California, where Ernest Lawrence had proposed the cyclotron. In 1930, MIT recruited Compton as its new president, hoping to transform the engineering school into a premier scientific research institution. Compton, in turn, recruited Van de Graaff in September 1931 to augment MIT's growing physics department.

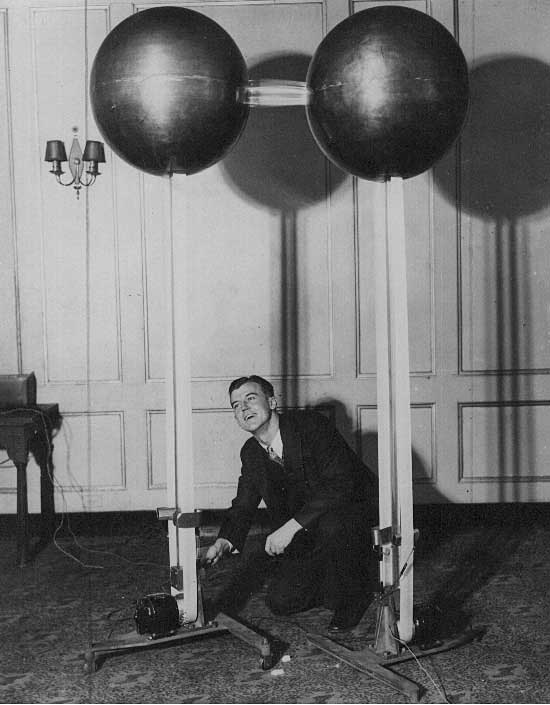
Van de Graaff demonstrated his $100 generator in Nov. 1931

Van de Graaff improved on his design by mounting a three-foot polished metal sphere on an insulated column. This approach eliminated the sharp edges of his tin-can prototype that caused electrical breakdown and generated approximately one million volts despite costing less than $100 to build. A demonstration of the generator at the American Institute of Physics inaugural dinner in November 1931 attracted significant attention. It showed that electrostatic generation could achieve voltages far exceeding those available from natural radioactive sources, making the case for a larger project. Back at MIT, Van de Graaff and his collaborators made plans for an air-insulated model to reach 10 megavolts, which would break the record for artificially generated voltages. This would require a terminal 100 times greater in volume.

=== Round Hill installation ===
In 1926, MIT had established a research program at Round Hill, the estate of "Colonel" Edward H.R. Green in South Dartmouth, Massachusetts. Green, a technology enthusiast and son of famed investor Hetty Green, agreed to open Round Hill to MIT researchers, expand the existing radio station on the property, and underwrite researchers' operating expenses. The facility was originally directed by Edward L. Bowles, who established research programs in radio communications, fog research, and aircraft navigation.

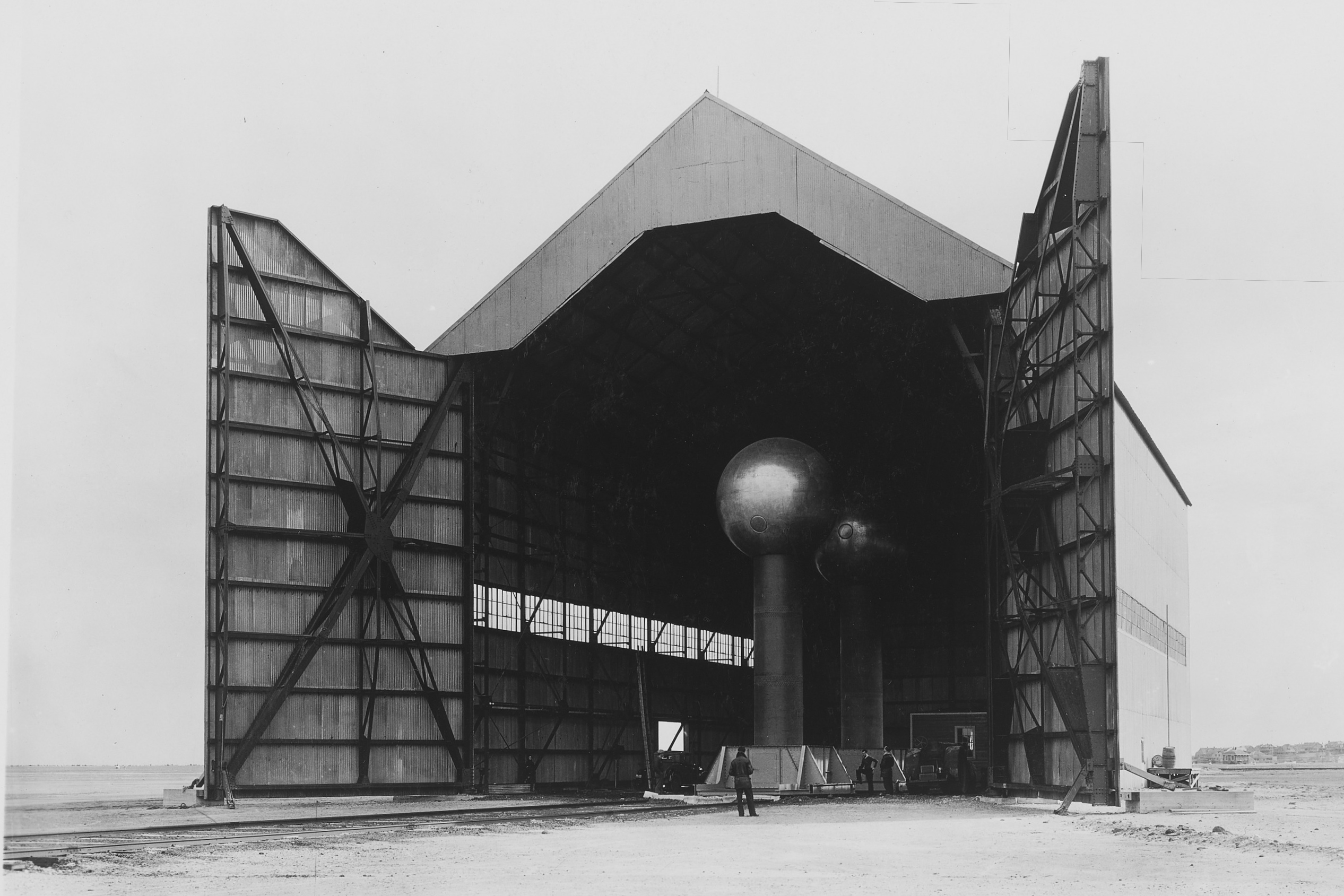
Installed at the Round Hill dirigible hangar, 1933

In 1931, Van de Graaff demonstrated a prototype generator at Round Hill. Colonel Green was "delighted" by the generator's spectacular electrical discharges and agreed to Compton's suggestion that a full-scale generator be constructed at the estate. Construction of the large-scale generator began in 1932, with Van de Graaff's equipment and research group moving to Round Hill in August of that year. The high-voltage installation was managed by Lester and Chester van Atta, Edward W. Samson, and Doyle L. Northrup, who operated independently of existing Round Hill research. Needing environmental control, the 43-foot generator was housed in an airship hangar on the estate that had previously been used for a Goodyear dirigible.

The machine was first demonstrated to the public on November 28, 1933, generating significant scientific and media attention. The generator produced spectacular lightning discharges, which made it a popular attraction for visitors and potential investors. The team conducted regular demonstrations, during which the machine would shoot huge purple bolts of lightning into the rafters of the hangar, creating a thunderous cracking sound. Though visually arresting, the display showed the operating limits of an air-insulated generator. The arcs of lighting again showed the difficulty of sustaining high voltages without breakdown.

In March 1934, famed electrical engineer Nikola Tesla wrote a cover story on the Round Hill generator for Scientific American, observing that the generator represented "a distinct advance over its predecessors," which included his own Tesla coil. He also expressed skepticism about the project's ultimate goals, writing that "it is highly probable that the attempts to smash the atomic nucleus and to transmute elements will yield results of doubtful value."

The Round Hill hangar proved a harsh site to make use of the generator's capabilities. Although the components were designed to limit discharges, pigeon droppings on the terminal spheres caused the intense sparking seen by the public. Humidity may have also promoted voltage breakdown in the terminal. Coastal rain and salt fog weakened the paper columns holding up the terminals. Designed to reach 10 megavolts, the generator's highest recorded voltages reached only half this level.

Although the voltages were adequate for nuclear distinintegration, no nuclear experiments were completed at Round Hill. In addition to environmental issues, it took almost four years to design an acceleration tube that could control a particle beam. These difficulties at Round Hill were disappointing to Van de Graaff, but did not deter him from further development of the technology.

=== Transfer to MIT's Cambridge campus ===
Following Colonel Green's death in 1936 and subsequent legal complications over his estate, the Round Hill research program ended. In 1937, the generator was transferred to MIT's Cambridge campus, where it was completely redesigned and reassembled. The move, along with construction of an improved charging belt assembly and remote control system, required "somewhat less than a year."

The reconfigured generator featured significant improvements over the Round Hill design. The two towers were reassembled as a single conjoined machine and the machine was placed in a new, sealed metal enclosure. The machine was housed within a welded steel shell enclosure with underground rooms for equipment and experiments. This redesign solved several problems: it eased repair and maintenance issues and addressed radiation safety concerns by placing the researchers in a small laboratory within the spheres, shielded from radiation. Targeting could be done in an underground room below the operators. The reconfigured generator operated at a lower but more stable voltage of up to 2.4 megavolts.

=== Transfer to Boston Museum of Science ===
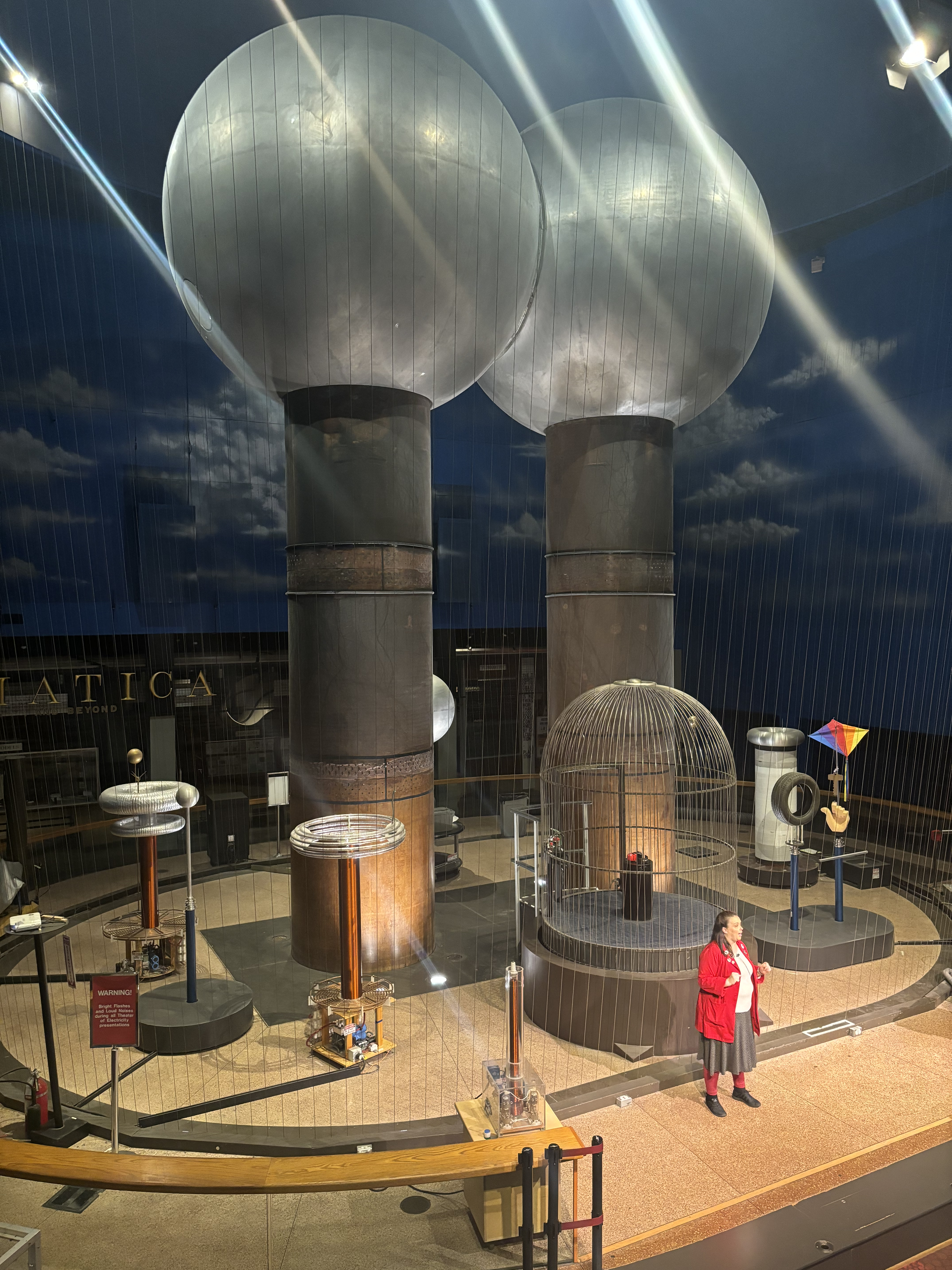

The generator remained in its enclosure at MIT until 1955, when its location was designated a site for a new cyclotron. Karl Compton, in his final years at MIT, suggested that the Round Hill generator could have value in educational demonstrations, just as it had captivated the media on its first public demonstration. MIT transferred the generator to the new building of the Boston Museum of Science, where it became the centerpiece of the museum's Elihu Thomson Theater of Electricity. Originally designed with 150 seats, the theater was enlarged in 1980 and improvements were made to run multiple shows a day.

== Design and operation ==
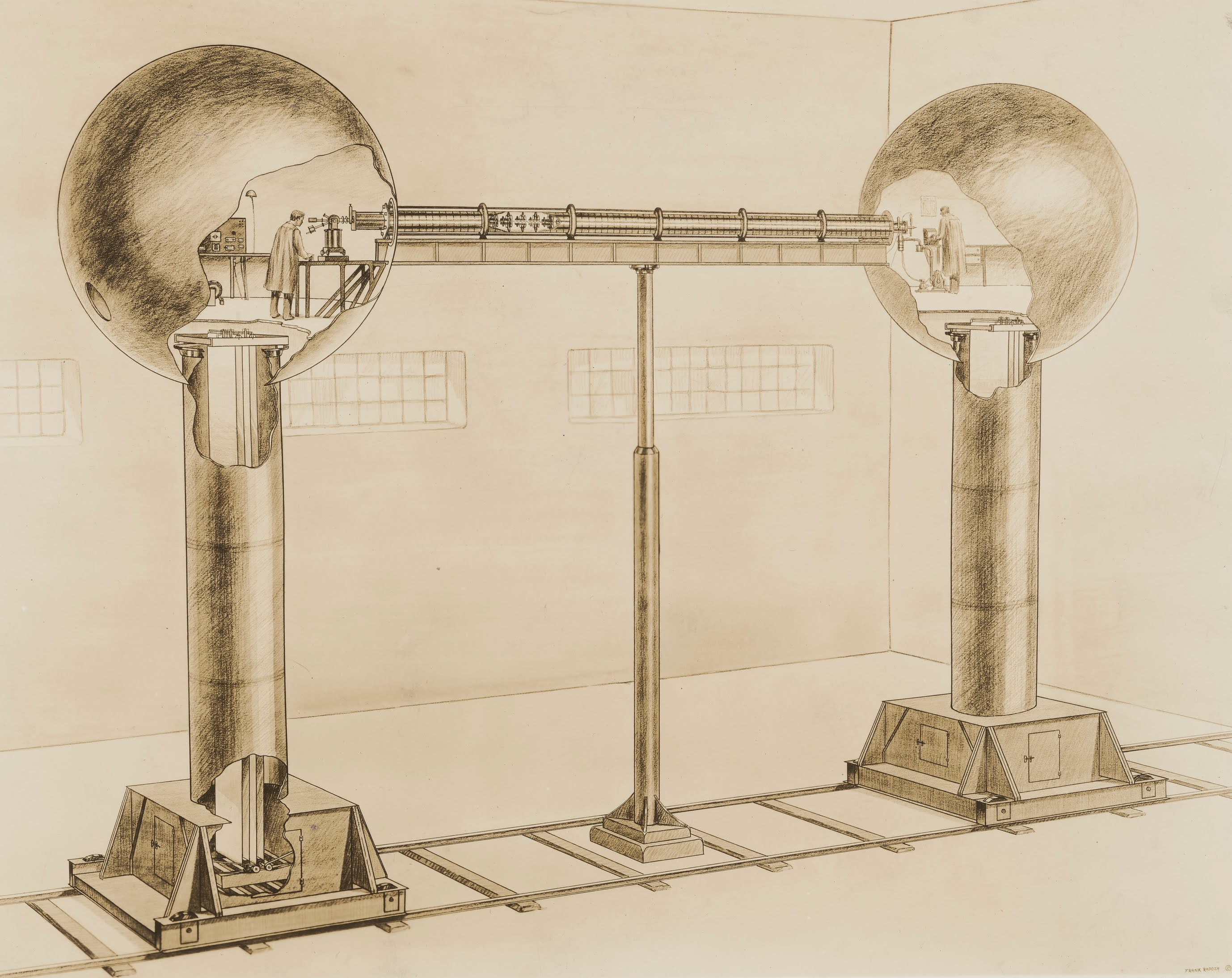
Early cutaway diagram of the generator

The Round Hill generator consisted of two separate units, each with a polished aluminum sphere 15 feet in diameter resting on a hollow cylindrical insulating column 25 feet high and 6 feet in diameter. The total height of the spheres above the ground was 43 feet. The columns were made of a material called Textolite, composed of hundreds of thin layers of paper cemented together under high pressure with shellac. The spheres and columns were mounted on heavy, four-wheeled trucks that operated on a railway track 14 feet wide, allowing researchers to vary the distance between the terminals. Each unit with its truck weighed approximately 16 tons.

Each unit contained endless paper belts operating vertically within the hollow columns, running from driving motors in the bases to pulleys within the spheres. The belts traveled at speeds of up to 5,650 feet per minute. The electrical charge was "sprayed" onto the belts at the base at a comparatively low pressure of 20,000 volts and carried up to the spheres, where it accumulated. One sphere stored negative charges, while the other stored positive charges. A vacuum-insulated accelerator tube was positioned between the spheres.

Originally designed to produce 10-megavolt potentials, environmental conditions made it difficult to reach this design rating. The maximum voltage achieved by the Round Hill generator was approximately 5.1 million volts between the terminals, with each sphere developing about 3.5 million volts. At full operating capacity, the generator could deliver a charging current of 2.1 milliamperes, with approximately 1.1 milliamperes available for application to an accelerating tube at maximum voltage.

== Technical contributions ==
The Round Hill generator was primarily designed for nuclear physics research, particularly for the study of atomic nuclei through high-energy particle bombardment. In the early 1930s, this represented the frontier of experimental atomic physics. Ultimately, John Cockcroft and Ernest Walton's 1932 voltage-multiplier circuit produced the first controlled "splitting of the atom." However, electrostatic power offered superior beam control and voltage regulation than contemporaries like the Cockcroft-Walton device, leading to its widespread adoption in nuclear experiments.

The Round Hill generator incorporated several technical innovations that advanced the state of high-voltage engineering. The generator featured an improved belt-charging systems that provided more stable operation and better voltage control than previous Van de Graaff designs. The vacuum-insulated accelerating tube prompted advances in vacuum technology. The reinstallation in Cambridge also made several innovations that became standard in subsequent accelerator designs. The generator featured one of the first comprehensive remote control systems for high-voltage equipment to manage radiation exposure concerns. Once re-installed in Cambridge, the installation's vacuum technology achieved pressures as low as 6×10^{−7} mm Hg, with normal operating pressure of 4×10^{−6} mm Hg during electron beam operation. The system could also accelerate both positive ions and electrons, though positive ion work was limited by outgassing from electrode surfaces.

The basic concept of Van de Graaff generator was openly published, leading many other physics labs to build models of the generator. However, many of the improvements made during the Round Hill experiment were patented by Van de Graaff, who filed a first patent in December 1931. In a first-of-its-kind partnership, these patents were assigned by MIT to the Research Corporation, which helped to fund the Round Hill installation. Later, these patents were used by Van de Graaff and his protege, John G. Trump, in a company they founded to build particle accelerators for cancer treatment and nuclear science, the High Voltage Engineering Corporation.

== Legacy ==
Experimental physicist D. Allan Bromley concludes: "Although performance of the Round Hill generator was disappointing to Van de Graaff the experience gained with this machine was invaluable to later designs and most particularly to subsequent work at MIT." The Round Hill generator's design principles influenced subsequent accelerator development and medical applications. In particular, the project demonstrated the feasibility of producing high, controllable voltages through electrostatic transport, leading to widespread adoption of the Van de Graaff accelerator in nuclear physics research.

While the Round Hill project was underway, Van de Graaff and Trump also worked on methods to making the technology more compact using vacuum insulation and gas insulation. In 1937, Trump developed a smaller Van de Graaff generator operating at 1 million volts for cancer therapy that was installed at Harvard's Huntington Memorial, the first use of the electrostatic accelerator in clinical medicine. By 1936, Trump was leading development of a 2-million-volt medical x-ray generator, described as producing "penetrating short-wave x-rays at a potential of one million volts for medical research and treatment of malignant disease."

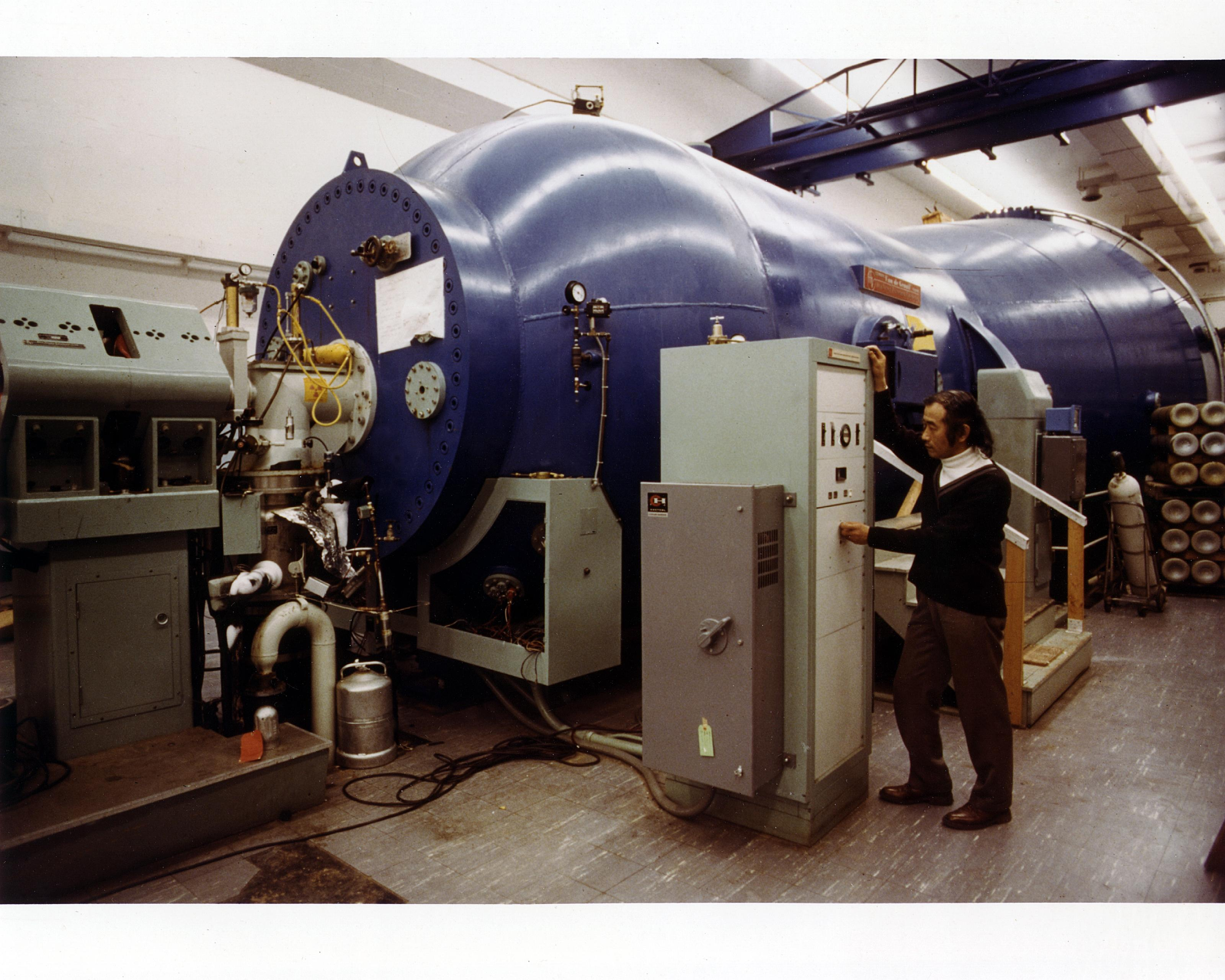
HVEC's Emperor tandem Van de Graaff generator at Yale University

After World War II, Trump and Van de Graaff further improved high-voltage electrostatic generators through the High Voltage Engineering Corporation (HVEC), founded in 1946. The company's would eventually produce about 500 high-voltage particle accelerators for research institutions worldwide. Trump remained focused on applications of the technology, while Van de Graaff focused on increasing scale that became primary instruments for nuclear physics research around the world.
