= Hargrove Van de Graaff =

American football player (1893–1938)

Profile
- Position: End

Personal information
- Born: September 7, 1893; Tuscaloosa, Alabama, U.S.
- Died: January 2, 1938 (aged 44); Missouri, U.S.
- Listed weight: 146 lb (66 kg)

Career information
- High school: Tuscaloosa
- College: Alabama (1911–1913)

Awards and highlights
- All-Southern (1911, 1912, 1913)

Coleman Hargrove Van de Graaff (September 7, 1893 – January 2, 1938) was a college football player. He was an advocate for an airport in Tuscaloosa.

== Early life ==
Hargrove Van de Graaff was born on September 7, 1893, in Tuscaloosa, Alabama, to Circuit Judge Adrian Sebastian Van de Graaff Sr. and Minnie Cherokee Jemison Van de Graaff.

He helped organize sports at Tuscaloosa High School with football, baseball, and track.

== College athletics ==
Van de Graaff was an All-Southern end for the Alabama Crimson Tide of the University of Alabama. His brothers Adrian and William also played for Alabama. William, known as "Bully," was Alabama's first All-American. Hargrove was the smallest of the three. Hargrove also played baseball and lettered in track. Robert J. Van de Graaff, the inventor of the Van de Graaff generator which produces high voltages, was another brother.

Following a hard-fought scoreless tie with Georgia Tech in 1911, coach John Heisman declared that he had never seen a player "so thoroughly imbued with the true spirit of football as Hargrove Van de Graaff." In a game in 1913 against Tennessee, Van de Graaff nearly lost an ear and tried to rip it off to avoid leaving the game.

== Military ==
After graduation, Van de Graaff followed Adrian into the military. He served in Mexico and in France in the First World War. Hargrove came back with the Croix de Guerre.
