= Adrian Van de Graaff =

American football player and coach (1891–1936)

Biographical details
- Born: September 6, 1891; Tuscaloosa, Alabama, U.S.
- Died: March 14, 1936 (aged 44); Tuscaloosa, Alabama, U.S.

Playing career
- 1911–1913: Alabama
- 1917: Camp Gordon
- Position: Halfback

Coaching career (HC unless noted)
- 1919: Alabama (assistant)

Accomplishments and honors

Awards
- 2× All-Southern (1912, 1913)

Adrian Van Vinceler Van de Graaff (September 6, 1891 – March 14, 1936) was an American college football player and coach. He played halfback for the Alabama Crimson Tide football of the University of Alabama. After football, he practiced law.

== Early years ==
Van de Graaff was born on September 6, 1891, in Tuscaloosa, Alabama, to Adrian Sebastian "Bass" Van de Graaff and Minnie Cherokee Jemison. Adrian, Sr. was a circuit judge who had been a sub on Yale's football team of 1880. Adrian attended Tuscaloosa High School.

=== University of Alabama ===
Following in his father's footsteps, Van de Graaff joined the Alabama football team, becoming a prominent member of its 1911 and 1912 teams. At Alabama he was a member of Phi Delta Theta. Van de Graaff's younger brothers Hargrove and William were also prominent football players for Alabama, William being the program's first All-American. Younger still was brother Robert J. Van de Graaff, the inventor of the Van de Graaff Generator which produces high voltages.

==== 1912 ====
Van de Graaff was selected All-Southern in 1912 by Nathan Stauffer of Collier's Weekly.

==== 1917 ====
In 1917, Camp Gordon, the second military opponent Alabama faced as the country mobilized for World War I, beat the Tide 19–6. Camp Gordon had several players with college experience, including Van de Graaff.

== Law ==
Van de Graaff was "one of the most brilliant member of the Alabama bar, having an unusual aptitude for legal research."
