= High Voltage Engineering Corporation =

American manufacturer, 1946–2005

- Type: Private (1946–63); Public (1963–88)
- Traded as: NYSE: HVE
- Industry: Scientific instruments; Industrial radiography
- Founded: December 1946 in Cambridge, Mass.
- Founders: John G. Trump; Robert Van de Graaff; Denis M. Robinson
- Defunct: 2005
- Headquarters: Burlington, Mass., USA
- Products: Van de Graaff accelerator; Tandem accelerator; Insulated core transformer
- Number of employees: 935 (1969)
- Subsidiaries: High Voltage Engineering Europa; Electronized Chemicals Corp.; Ion Physics Corp.; Applied Radiation Corp.

High Voltage Engineering Corporation (HVEC) was an American manufacturer of particle accelerators and one of the first venture capital-backed startups.

HVEC originated at MIT, where physicist Robert Van de Graaff invented a high-voltage electrostatic particle accelerator and his colleague John Trump miniaturized it for cancer radiotherapy. In 1946, Trump organized a company to manufacture these machines, recruiting Van de Graaff and Denis Robinson as co-founders. Production began in a Cambridge automobile garage.

The company's early medical devices gave way to large research accelerators after the Sputnik crisis increased governments' investments in nuclear physics. For two decades, HVEC accelerators were the dominant platform for nuclear physics; in the 1970s, nearly 70 percent of experimental papers relied on HVEC machines. The company built 471 accelerators between 1946 and 1981. They were installed at hospitals, universities, and national laboratories in 30 countries, and some remain in active research use.

Using these instruments, HVEC subsidiaries introduced new uses of accelerator beams. Ion Physics Corporation demonstrated that ion implantation could precisely control transistor characteristics, a technique now essential to integrated circuit fabrication. Electronized Chemicals Corporation developed methods to crosslink plastics with electron beams, producing the heat-shrink tubing now ubiquitous in electrical wiring.

HVEC was one of the first two startups backed by the American Research & Development Corporation, the first modern venture capital fund. By 1960, it was the fund's most successful investment, and its returns helped demonstrate the viability of venture investing in start-ups. After federal science funding contracted in the late 1960s, HVEC ceased accelerator production and reorganized as a conglomerate. The company was taken private in 1988 and filed for bankruptcy in 2005.

== History ==
=== Founding and early development ===
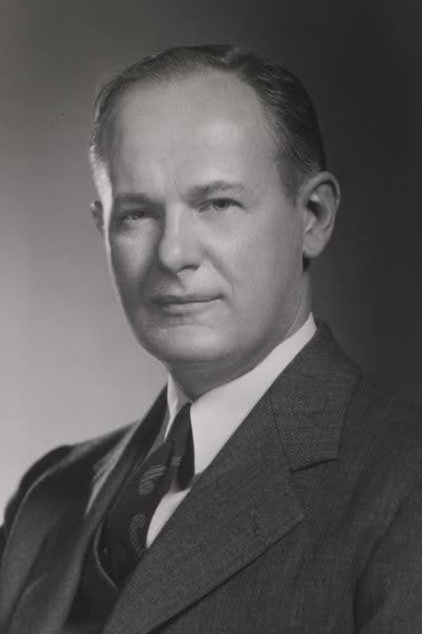
John G. Trump, chairman

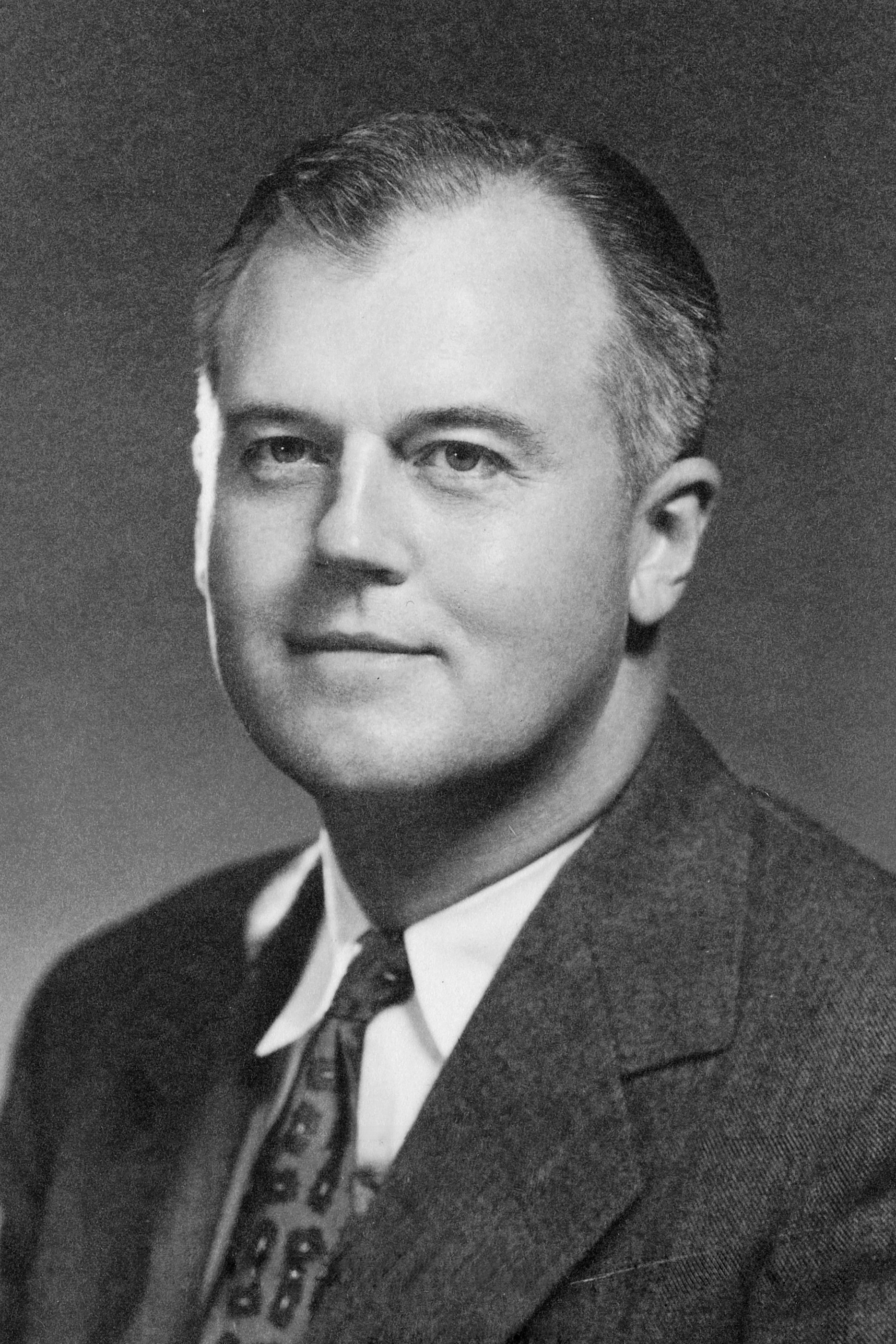
Robert J. Van de Graaff, chief scientist

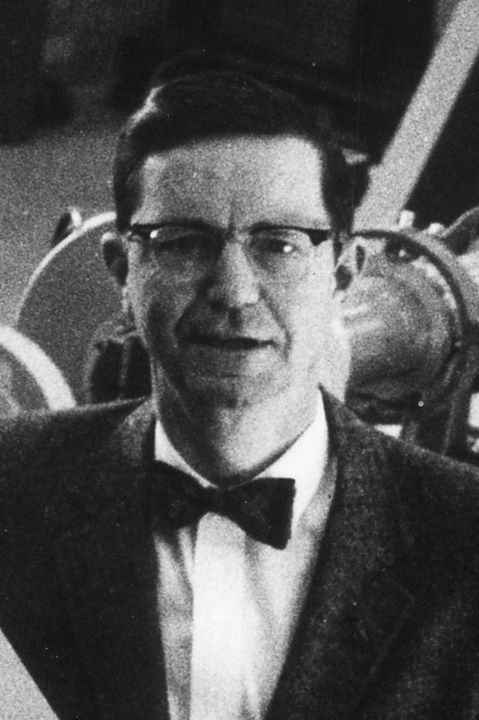
Denis M. Robinson, president

High Voltage Engineering Corporation accelerators originated with the electrostatic generator designed by MIT physicist Robert J. Van de Graaff. In an effort to split the atom, Van de Graaff devised a electrostatic method to accelerate and direct charged particles at high voltages. While constructing a high-voltage prototype accelerator in the early 1930s, Van de Graaff patented several technologies that would form part of the future company's technology base. (Note: MIT assigned these, along with John Trump's later patents, to the Research Corporation for licensing.)

MIT professor John G. Trump, an apprentice of Van de Graaff, focused on making the generators useful for cancer radiotherapy. In the 1930s, few hospitals could afford radium sources, available x-ray sources were insufficiently powerful, and both methods damaged healthy tissues. Trump proposed that the unlimited, controllable beam output of Van de Graaff devices could make treatment affordable and safer. He built a series of compact "supervoltage" (>1-megavolt) x-ray generators for local cancer hospitals and secured further patents for the smaller generators. (Note: Trump's modifications included refitting the accelerator tube to discharge x-rays and employing gas insulation to shrink the size. During World War II, Van de Graaff several of these compact units for radiographic inspections of Navy ships and captured enemy munitions.)

Returning from his World War II leave, Trump received requests from several British hospitals for new cancer generators and decided a company could better fulfill further orders. He recruited Van de Graaff to serve as co-founder and chief scientist. Neither professor wished to leave MIT, so Trump brought in British physicist Denis M. Robinson as a third co-founder and president. (Note: Beginning with the U.S.–U.K. radar exchange of 1940, Robinson served as British liaison to the MIT Radiation Laboratory, where he worked closely with Trump.) In 1946, Trump approached his wartime colleague, MIT President Karl Compton, about supporting the venture. Compton had recently founded the American Research and Development Corporation (ARD) to spur the formation of new post-war industries. He introduced the founders to ARD's president, Georges Doriot.

Doriot predicted the cancer treatment machines would be a commercial failure. (Note: General Electric and Allis-Chalmers were already testing artificial radiotherapy products, and Doriot surmised they would be priced below HVEC's machines.) Nevertheless, he perceived HVEC's leaders to be technically capable, and Compton persuaded him that ARD should have a startup with clear human benefits. Among more than 400 applications, Doriot selected the firm among ARD's first three investments. He offered the founders $200,000 in initial capitalization, leaving half the equity to them and their staff consultants. (Note: HVEC secured an additional $50,000 direct investment from the Lessing J. Rosenwald family.) Compton arranged for HVEC to exclusively license MIT's Van de Graaff and Trump patents. Both Compton and Doriot served on the new company's board.

=== Supervoltage cancer therapy ===
Working from an auto garage near Harvard Square, HVEC began building Trump's gas-insulated Van de Graaff generators for hospitals and manufacturers. In 1947, the first orders came from several British hospitals for HVEC's compact 2-megavolt machines. The company was among the first to make artificial radiation sources commercially available for cancer treatment.

After three years, HVEC had delivered 17 particle accelerators, employed 140 people, and negotiated $2 million in sales (equivalent to $27.1 million in 2025), eclipsing its competitors' products and undercutting them on price. Nevertheless, the company faced severe financial difficulties in its early years. On several occasions, technical problems brought HVEC to within days of exhausting both money and credit.

By the mid-1950s, successor technologies like cobalt-60 machines built by General Electric began dominating hospital orders, offering simpler operation and lower maintenance costs. Although HVEC remained in the medical market until 1969, the company increasingly focused on redesigning its generators for research and industrial applications.

=== Pivot to scientific instruments ===
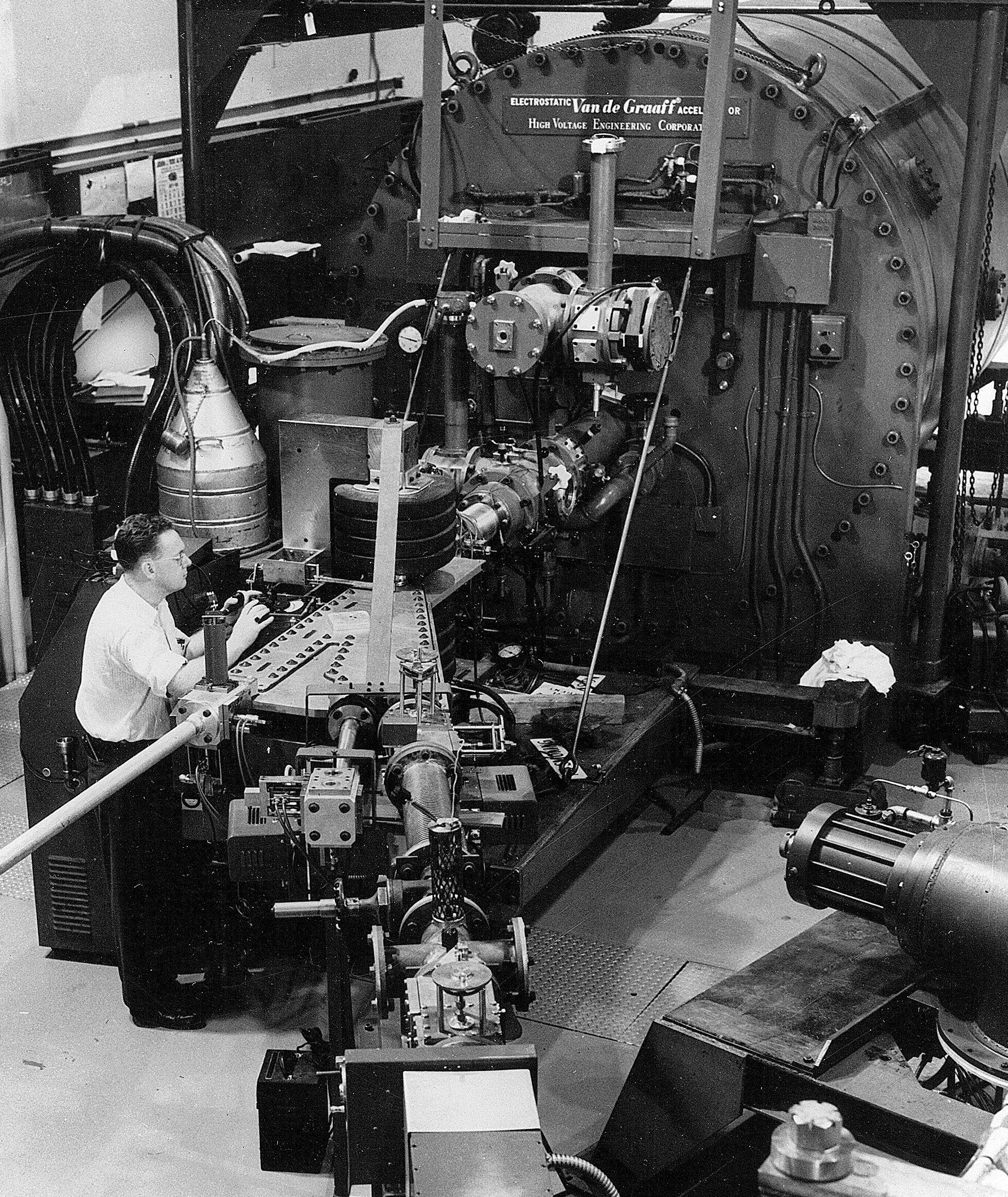
The HVEC injector at Brookhaven (1952)

HVEC had originally built products for clients in cancer therapy and industrial radiography, but its machines proved valuable for basic research. The company's proximity to MIT research gave it unique advantages in understanding accelerator requirements. Van de Graaff, Trump, and fellow board member William Buechner regularly consulted with physicists pushing the boundaries of nuclear structure studies, translating experimental needs into engineering specifications.

In 1949, Brookhaven National Laboratory commissioned HVEC to build a 4 MeV Van de Graaff particle injector for its planned high-energy Cosmotron accelerator. When completed in 1953, the Cosmotron became the first accelerator to exceed billion-electronvolt potentials. HVEC's standard 2 MV accelerators also found nuclear science customers, including the Naval Research Laboratory and European universities. (Note: Contemporary sources note that other research particle accelerators like the betatron could reach higher voltages, but steady electrostatic power and beam versatility of Van de Graaff generators were valuable for precision experimental work.)

In 1951, HVEC adopted a Trump-designed MIT accelerator as a research accelerator prototype. This single-stage "CN" model was the first mass-produced research accelerator. CN machines operated at voltages up to 6.5 megavolts and established HVEC's reputation for reliability in nuclear research applications. In 1954, Canada's Chalk River Laboratories asked HVEC to modify the CN into higher-voltage tandem accelerator, yielding a highly profitable product line that sustained the company for fifteen years.

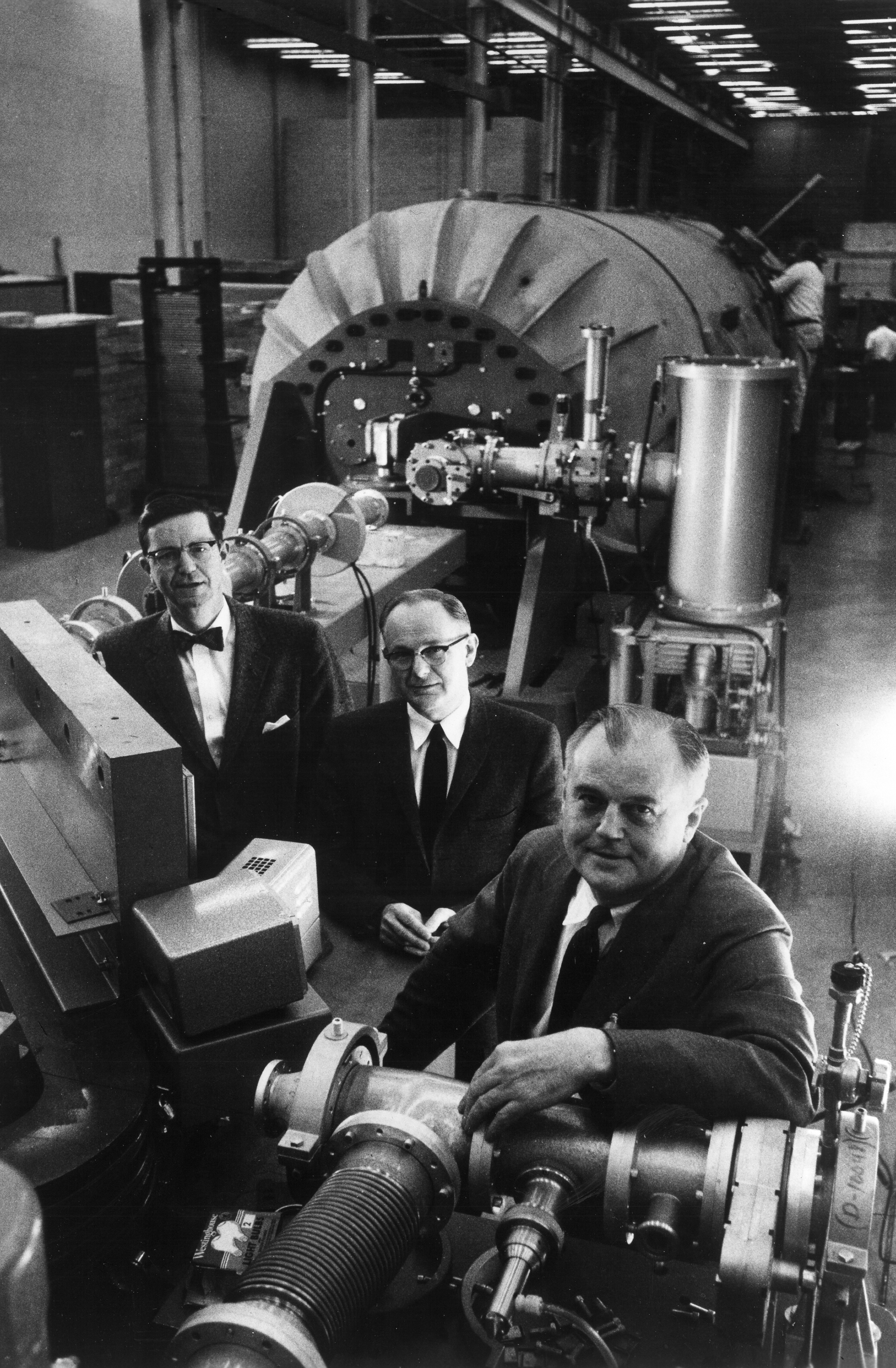
Robinson, Trump, Van de Graaff and an EN tandem (c. 1957)

In the push for large research accelerators, HVEC outgrew the space available in its Cambridge auto garage. The company opened a production plant on Route 128 in Burlington, Massachusetts in 1957. At the recommendation of board member Doriot, the company also opened a Dutch subsidiary, High Voltage Engineering Europa, to supply accelerators in the European common market.

Western reaction to the 1957 launch of Sputnik transformed the commercial opportunities for nuclear instrumentation. Laboratories had typically built their own accelerators from scratch. After Sputnik, the Atomic Energy Commission and National Science Foundation generously funded university and national laboratory purchases of research particle accelerators. HVEC's reliable, manufactured machines became the preferred instrument. Over fifteen years, HVEC sold 55 tandem accelerators to research laboratories in seven countries, selling each for $1–3 million. By the mid-1970s, nearly 70% of papers in experimental nuclear physics relied on data from HVEC accelerators.

HVEC entered the 1960s as the nation's leading manufacturer of particle accelerators and was the single best investment ARD had made. Annual sales climbed from $1 million in 1954 to $17 million in 1962. At the time of its public listing on the New York Stock Exchange in 1963, HVEC was more than 40% of ARD's portfolio assets, having grown ARD's original $0.2M investment to $13.2 million.

=== The Transuranium bet ===
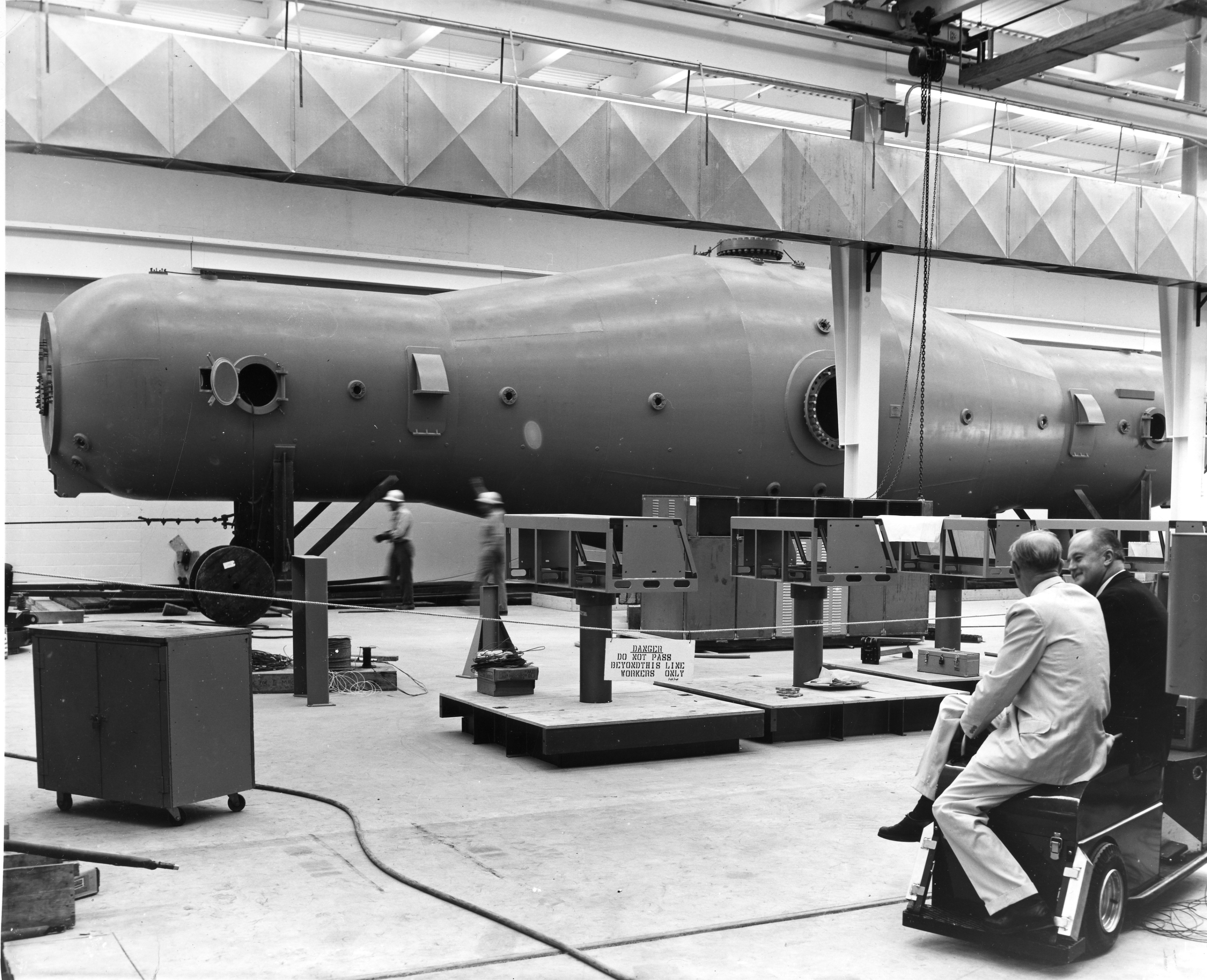
Trump and Van de Graaff with the MP tandem

Already chief scientist, Van de Graaff joined HVEC full-time in 1960. He worked with colleagues to introduce the industrial core transformer. Focused on scientific hypothesis at the frontier of the field, he championed development of the company's most ambitious accelerator. Theoretical models predicted an "island of stability" of superheavy elements—heavy atoms that would resist rapid radioactive decay despite lying beyond uranium on the periodic table. (Note: The XTU was designed to generate energy potentials sufficient for synthesizing elements from 114 to 126, predicted to lie within the island of stability.) Van de Graaff believed that stable superheavy elements could provide nuclear fuel for long-distance space missions or enable compact nuclear weapons, making superheavy ion synthesis the top priority for accelerator research.

The proposed 20-megavolt Transuranium Accelerator (XTU) pushed HVEC accelerators towards this frontier. HVEC invested more than $4.6 million in two XTU prototypes (equivalent to $44.4 million in 2025). Anticipating that laboratories would compete to acquire machines capable of historic discoveries, leadership adopted a "build first and seek customers later" approach.

During the XTU's construction in 1967–68, federal support for basic nuclear physics declined sharply. The Vietnam War and Great Society programs drew resources away from fundamental research. Simultaneously, the discovery of sub-atomic quarks put the high-energy frontier of physics research beyond the reach of Van de Graaff accelerators. By the time the XTU passed preliminary tests the following year, the U.S. Atomic Energy Commission had said it would not fund purchases. One month later, HVEC announced it was mothballing the XTU and closing the Van de Graaff Research Laboratory in Burlington.

The market failure of the XTU coincided with new competitive pressures. Operational difficulties with HVEC's Emperor tandems further damaged the company's competitive position. Laboratories reported technical problems with the Emperor requiring costly component replacements. In 1965, fellow physicist and former HVEC consultant Ray Herb founded the National Electrostatics Corporation. The company's durable Pelletron charging technology became the favored platform for federally-funded accelerator research. HVEC sold its final two Emperor models to French national laboratories in 1973.

=== Diversification and decline ===
The ensuing financial crisis prompted a major strategic transition. In 1970, HVEC's losses represented 31 percent of total stockholder investment. The company laid off 100 employees and suspended many research programs, citing insufficient federal funding for basic physics research. That year also marked a leadership transition: Pascal Levesque, head of the profitable HVEC subsidiary Electronized Chemicals Corporation, became president and chief executive, while departing president Denis Robinson assumed the chairmanship held by Trump.

Under new management, HVEC diversified into industrial applications of its accelerator technologies. By 1972, the company had reorganized as a miniconglomerate with more than ten subsidiaries manufacturing plastics, power equipment, and radiation processing systems—products enabled by particle accelerators rather than particle accelerators themselves. The diversification strategy yielded several commercially successful products. Electronized Chemicals Corporation's heat-shrink tubing, made by electron-beam crosslinking of polyethylene, became ubiquitous in electrical wiring. The technology enabled modern wire harnesses in automobiles and aircraft, where compact, reliable insulation was essential. Ion Physics Corporation introduced radiation-based ion implantation, enabling precise control of transistor characteristics in integrated circuits. HVEC closed Ion Physics in 1971, but became standard practice throughout the global semiconductor industry by the late 1970s. While research accelerators had once generated 70 percent of sales, industrial products now accounted for 80 percent.

Despite the strategic pivot, HVEC struggled to achieve sustained profitability. Its subsidiaries faced intense competition from larger conglomerates. In 1981, HVEC divested from its accelerator manufacturing business. Two years later, it sold its Burlington manufacturing plant. The company refocused on smaller industrial products including specialty plastics, wire, industrial instruments, and electrical connectors. Through the 1980s, HVEC progressively sold these product lines to other manufacturing conglomerates.

In 1988, private equity firm Hyde Park Partners bid to take HVEC private at roughly twice its prevailing share price. Though Levesque resisted, shareholders accepted the offer in 1989. Hyde Park dismissed existing management, sold remaining real estate, and relocated the headquarters to Charlestown, Massachusetts. The company filed for bankruptcy in 2005. Since 2019, corporate remnants have been held by Oak Point Partners.

=== Venture capital legacy ===
HVEC was among the first three investments of ARD, the first modern venture capital fund. By 1960, it was ARD's largest and most successful asset, having grown the original $200,000 investment to $13.2 million. These returns sustained ARD through its early years and enabled its 1957 investment in Digital Equipment Corporation. The latter's eventual $355 million return established the now-standard model where exceptional returns from a single investment justify a venture fund's diversified portfolio of high-risk bets.

The company also embodied ARD's innovative methods of investing: active participation in management, selection for scientific talent, and focus on technology-intensive industries where technical barriers provided durable profitability. Barron's described HVEC as "an ideal example of the way [ARD] likes to work."

== Technology ==
HVEC manufactured approximately 471 particle accelerators between 1946 and 1981. Its former European subsidiary, High Voltage Engineering Europa, produced another 93 between 1958 and 2005. Over 25 years, the company's Van de Graaff product lines evolved from 2.5-metre (8.2 ft) compact medical X-ray generators to 24.5-metre (80 ft) tandem accelerators for nuclear physics research. HVEC also developed the insulating core transformer, a new high-voltage direct current generator that found applications in industrial radiation processing. These products enabled commercial development of electron-beam sterilization, radiation crosslinking of polymers, and ion implantation for semiconductor manufacturing.

=== Medical equipment ===
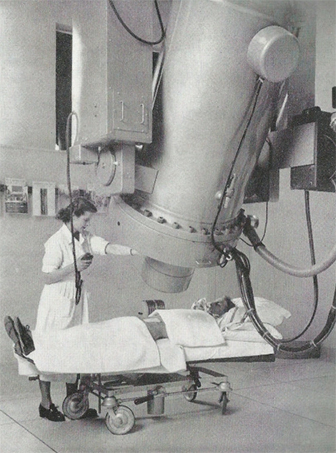
1949 2 MV machine at Sheffield's hospital

HVEC's first product line targeted cancer treatment, an application that demonstrated the practical value of controlled particle acceleration for medicine. Between 1948 and 1969, the company manufactured compact 2-megavolt electron accelerators designed for hospital radiotherapy departments. These 8-foot-long generators could be operated by technicians and nurses, making radiation therapy accessible beyond major research hospitals. During their production run, 35 U.S. hospitals and eight hospitals abroad installed the machines for cancer treatment.

The generators addressed significant limitations in available cancer treatments. Traditional radiotherapy relied on radium sources, which were expensive, scarce, and produced uncontrolled radiation that damaged healthy tissue surrounding tumors. Low-voltage (0.25 MV) x-ray devices were available, but lacked sufficient penetration to treat deep tumors and caused violent skin reactions. HVEC's 1- and 2-MV Van de Graaff accelerators generated artificial X-rays that could be precisely aimed and modulated, allowing physicians to target deep-seated tumors while minimizing exposure to surrounding organs. The beam energy could be adjusted to match tumor depth, and therapy could be spread across multiple sessions to reduce side effects.

HVEC also supported medical research. Several HVEC machines were used in joint research programs between the Lahey Clinic and Trump's MIT laboratory, where physicians developed rotation techniques that delivered radiation from multiple angles to concentrate dosage on tumors while limiting any single beam path through healthy tissue. These protocols became standard practice in radiation oncology. In 1954, HVEC and MIT completed a compact linear accelerator for the University of Chicago's Argonne Cancer Research Hospital, capable of producing electrons at variable energies from 10 to 50 million electron volts. This research instrument enabled experiments in high-energy radiation therapy that informed treatment protocols.

By the mid-1950s, however, cobalt-60 therapy machines manufactured by General Electric began displacing electron accelerators in hospital purchasing. The cobalt sources, a byproduct of nuclear reactor use, offered simpler operation and lower maintenance costs, though with less precise energy control. HVEC exited the medical device market in 1969, as its competitive advantages shifted toward research and industrial applications where beam controllability justified higher complexity.

=== Industrial radiography ===
During World War II, Van de Graaff had used the compact generator invented with Trump to detect defects in ship hulls and ordnance for the U.S. Navy. Drawing on this application, HVEC produced 2-MeV industrial X-ray generators for non-destructive testing of manufactured goods. These units, capable of detecting flaws in thick steel sections, weighed more than two tons and were designed to operate in industrial facilities.

HVEC adapted these generators to output electron beams, selling a line of industrial radiography equipment and also renting sterilization services to other companies. In 1957, Ethicon, a medical subsidiary of Johnson & Johnson, purchased an HVEC linear accelerator to sterilize surgical sutures, the first commercial medial product to use radiation processing. (Note: In 1960, Ethicon switched to gamma irradiation machines that could fully penetrate these materials.)

Sales of e-beam processing machines picked up after HVEC introduced insulating core transformers. ICTs, operating in the lower-voltage 300 keV to 2.5 MeV range, were used for crosslinking polyethylene and other polymers. W. R. Grace's Cryovac division used radiation crosslinking to produce heat-shrinkable materials for food packaging. Other companies purchased ICTs for extended to wire and cable insulation, rubber vulcanization, auto paint, textile modification, and semiconductors.

Irradiated plastic shrinks after heating

As HVEC shifted into conglomerate model, its subsidiary Electronized Chemicals Corporation began producing in-house products with HVEC devices. By 1960, ECC had introduced product lines in heat-shrink tubing, shrink wrap, and cross-linked wiring.

In the late 1970s, piggybacking on research projects led by John Trump, HVEC expanded into environmental applications of electron beam technology. In 1980, the company received a $1 million contract from Miami-Dade County for electron beam equipment to disinfect wastewater before discharge to sanitary landfills. The company also received contracts to expand a prototype sewage sludge treatment plant for the Massachusetts Metropolitan District Commission and to develop an electron beam system for poultry feed disinfection.

=== Research accelerators ===
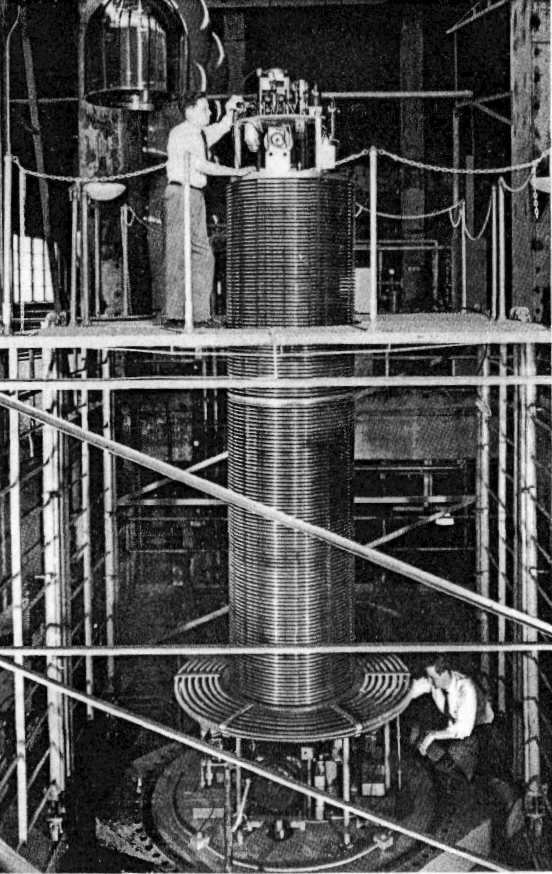
CN accelerator column without its tank

HVEC's entry into high-energy research accelerators began in 1949 with its 4 MV Cosmotron particle injector. By 1951, HVEC had begun producing its single-ended CN series that became the first mass-produced research accelerators.

The CN design was based on a vertical accelerator at MIT designed by John Trump. It employed resistor grading in both column and tube structure, field-shaping column hoops, and high-pressure insulating gas mixtures of nitrogen and carbon dioxide. Operating in a single stage at terminal voltages up to 6.5 megavolts, the 26 CN models manufactured by HVEC reliable platforms for light-ion nuclear physics experiments. However, fundamental physics questions, particularly the structure of heavier nuclei, demanded higher particle energies than a single-stage Van de Graaff accelerator could reach.

==== The tandem principle ====
The solution emerged from a charge-reversal concept proposed demonstrated by Nobel laureate Luis Alvarez in 1951. (Note: Originally proposed by W.W. Bennett, Alvarez's demonstration could be commercially "reduced to practice.") Rather than accelerate positive ions from ground to a high-voltage terminal, the tandem accelerator begins with negative ions. These particles accelerate toward a positive terminal, where a thin foil or gas stripper removes multiple electrons, converting them to positive ions. The now-positive particles accelerate away from the terminal back to ground potential. This double acceleration effectively multiplies the particle energy without requiring proportionally higher terminal voltages. A negative hydrogen ion accelerated through a 5 megavolt tandem emerges with 10 megavolts of kinetic energy.

After commissioning tandem production in 1954, Atomic Energy of Canada Limited placed HVEC's first tandem order in September 1956 for $0.92M (equivalent to $10.89M in 2025). The machine achieved first beam at HVEC's Burlington facility in June 1958. (Note: After installation at Chalk River, the accelerator delivered first beam on target in February 1959.)

==== Tandem models ====
Between 1958 and 1973, HVEC manufactured 55 tandem accelerators in four progressively larger models. Each generation opened new experiments with heavier ions, higher energies, and previously inaccessible nuclear reactions.

The EN model became the production workhorse. First installed at Chalk River in 1959, it was the first large accelerator to use pure sulfur hexafluoride as insulating gas, which allowed higher voltages in a smaller tank. Its commercial viability depended on two developments: sufficiently intense negative ion sources (developed at Chalk River and Wisconsin) and HVEC's invention of the inclined-field acceleration tube, which solved the voltage breakdown problem that had plagued earlier long tubes. (Note: Earlier tubes suffered from "total-voltage effects": secondary particles created when the beam struck residual gas molecules would gain energy along the tube length, triggering cascading electrical breakdowns. The inclined-field design arranged electrodes at alternating angles, sweeping slow secondary particles into the electrodes while allowing beam particles to pass.) HVEC built 30 EN units for institutions across seven countries. At Chalk River, researchers used the EN to discover quasi-molecular states—transient configurations where colliding nuclei briefly orbit each other before separating.

The FN model ("King") extended terminal voltages to 9 megavolts in its "Super FN" variant. The first went to Los Alamos in October 1963. HVEC sold 17 FN units to laboratories including Rutgers, Florida State, Stanford, and national research institutes in France and Romania.

The MP model ("Emperor"), a much larger model commissioned by the Atomic Energy Commission in 1962, employed an "open truss" column structure—beams fabricated from alternating steel and glass plates bonded with epoxy—that supported a substantially larger terminal while maintaining electrical insulation. The first MP, installed at Yale in 1963, operated consistently at 10–11 megavolts; a later installation at Strasbourg reached 18. At these energies, electron stripping becomes highly efficient. A uranium ion passing through the terminal can lose more than 20 electrons, enabling heavy-ion fusion experiments impossible with earlier machines. Advances in gamma-ray spectroscopy combined with MP tandems enabled precision measurements of nuclear structure. HVEC manufactured 10 MP units between 1965 and 1973 for institutions including the University of Minnesota, Chalk River, and the Max Planck Institute in Heidelberg.

The XTU ("Holy Roman Emperor") was designed for superheavy element synthesis. Theoretical models predicted an "island of stability" beyond element 110 where nuclei would resist rapid decay. The XTU's 20-megavolt rating would accelerate uranium ions to nearly one billion electron volts—enough to overcome Coulomb barriers in heavy-element fusion. Two prototypes operated solely on a test basis at Burlington before the project was cancelled. One later sold to Italy's national laboratory at Legnaro in 1979.

HVEC research particle accelerator models
Model	Type	Nickname	Production years	Tank (l x D)	No. Sold	Rating (MV)	Max. (MV)	Price
CN	Single-stage	--	1958–1966	8.0 x	26	5.5	--	--
EN	Tandem	--	1958–1973	11.0 x 2.4	30	5	7	--
FN	Tandem	King	1963–1970	13.4 x 3.6	17	9	17	--
MP	Tandem	Emperor	1962–1973	24.5 x 4.5	10	10	18	--
XTU	Tandem	Holy Roman Emperor	1967–1969	24.5 x 7.6	2	14	20	--

Sources: Bromley 1974

=== Insulated core transformer ===
By the early 1950s, Van de Graaff recognized that electrostatic accelerators would eventually require higher currents than his belt-charged system could deliver. Rather than abandon direct current power, he conceived a novel voltage-generating principle that replaced his electrostatic charging belt with magnetic flux as the means of transforming power to high-voltage direct current. (Note: The key innovation involved creating a magnetic core capable of insulating high voltage while allowing electric and magnetic fields to coexist simultaneously in the same space, achieved by dividing the magnetic core into segments insulated from one another.) Van de Graaff filed a patent for his single-phase insulating core transformer (ICT) accelerator design in 1957, which was issued in 1965. HVEC engineers subsequently developed a three-phase version that proved commercially viable.

The ICT found particular success in industrial radiation processing applications. By 1967, the technology had gained recognition as an important source of high-voltage DC power for particle acceleration in industrial settings, with HVEC offering ICT power supplies for low-voltage electron beams alongside their belt-charged accelerators. ICT accelerators in the 300 keV to 1-million-volt range were installed on industrial processing lines for crosslinking plastic film and tubing, pasteurizing food, and sterilizing pharmaceuticals. (Note: Following HVEC's withdrawal from the accelerator manufacturing in the 1970s, the ICT technology was adopted by several companies including Vivirad-High Voltage, Nissin-High Voltage, the Cryovac division of Sealed Air Corporation, and Wasik Associates.) ICTs continued to be used for crosslinking wire and cable jacketing and shrinkable films, operating in the 300 keV to 2.5 MeV energy range

== Subsidiaries ==
Following declining earnings in 1965, HVEC reorganized into profit centers and established three wholly owned subsidiaries to diversify beyond particle accelerators. After U.S. orders for new accelerators ceased in the early 1970s, HVEC transformed into a miniconglomerate with more than ten subsidiaries, and industrial products from these units accounted for 80 percent of company revenues by 1972.

=== High Voltage Engineering Europa ===
HVEE's modern logo

In 1958, HVEC established High Voltage Engineering Europa (HVEE) in Amersfoort, Netherlands to supply accelerators to the European common market. The subsidiary was created in response to demand for accelerators in the European common market and export-controlled markets. HVEE manufactured HVEC's lower-voltage Van de Graaff accelerators for industries in the European common market, as well as insulated-core transformer power supplies for low-voltage electron beams.

According to production records compiled through 2004, HVEE manufactured 93 accelerators across various voltage ranges, mostly in the 0.5–2 MV range. HVEE also produced smaller numbers of higher-voltage systems, including three accelerators in the 5–7 MV range and one in the 4-5 MV range.

High Voltage Engineering Europa continued operations after its parent company's bankruptcy. HVEE produced low-voltage 1–5 MV, solid-state voltage generators with the trade names Tandetron and Singletron, originally designed by the General Ionix Corporation in Massachusetts. Having shifted away from belt-charged accelerators, HVEE's lower voltage accelerators now incorporate newer charging technologies.

=== Applied Radiation Corporation ===
In June 1960, High Voltage Engineering Corporation acquired Applied Radiation Corporation (ARCO) of Walnut Creek, California through a stock exchange. ARCO manufactured a line of linear accelerators with uses complementing those of HVEC's existing Van de Graaff accelerators. Applied Radiation was established as a separate subsidiary under its existing management, though its sales operations were integrated with HVEC's broader organization.

The acquisition, however, would prove short-lived due to antitrust concerns. At the time, HVEC dominated the market for research accelerators, controlling an 80 percent share of orders. In April 1963, the Federal Trade Commission issued a consent decree requiring HVEC to divest itself of Applied Radiation Corporation. This forced divestiture reflected FTC concerns about concentration in the particle accelerator manufacturing industry, as both firms competed for research and industrial accelerator clients.

=== Electronized Chemicals Corporation ===
In 1943, Arno Brasch and Wolfgang Huber built a bespoke particle accelerator in Brooklyn, New York to irradiate foods, finding they could sterilize foods without affecting their taste. Brash and Huber founded Electronized Chemicals Corporation to explore methods for cold sterilization. HVEC acquired their company in 1957 and began to broadly explore radiation processing of materials.

Using HVEC's electron beam technology at a facility adjoining the HVEC Burlington plant, ECC's new operation in Burlington rented irridiation services to a variety of industries. It developed methods to irradiate and crosslink polymers. After Raychem pioneered a cross-linking method using low-voltage radiation in 1957, Electronized Chemicals followed it into the manufacture of heat-shrink tubing. In 1985, the business was acquired by 3M, which continues to manufacture heat-shrink tubing a factory in Chelmsford, Massachusetts.

=== Ion Physics Corporation ===
Ion Physics Corporation (IPC), an HVEC subsidiary, conducted the first commercial research in ion implantation, a technique that became essential to semiconductor manufacturing worldwide.

IPC originated in 1959 as a joint venture with B.F. Goodrich to develop ion propulsion for spacecraft. The venture delivered an experimental ion engine to the Jet Propulsion Laboratory for testing. After HVEC bought out Goodrich in 1962, the subsidiary was renamed Ion Physics Corporation and pivoted toward ion bombardment techniques for fabricating solar cells and other semiconductor devices. Using Van de Graaff accelerators to implant ions into silicon wafers, IPC achieved several advances by the mid-1960s: a new efficiency record for silicon solar cells, the first bipolar transistor made from ion-implanted junctions, and annealing processes to repair crystal damage caused by bombardment.

In 1969, Fairchild Semiconductor contracted with HVEC for a low-energy ion accelerator. Peter Rose, HVEC's research director, built a functional prototype in six weeks from stockroom parts. The machine demonstrated that ion implantation could precisely control the placement and quantity of dopant atoms in silicon—offering finer control over transistor characteristics than traditional diffusion techniques.

IPC itself failed to commercialize the technology. After three executives resigned in late 1969, Rose was appointed president, but the subsidiary continued to struggle. In 1971, Rose left to found Extrion Corporation with HVEC backing and IPC closed the same year. Extrion became the dominant manufacturer of ion implanters. By the late 1970s, ion implantation was standard practice throughout the semiconductor industry, enabling the MOS integrated circuits that would dominate late twentieth-century electronics.

=== High Voltage Power Corporation ===
In July 1968, High Voltage Engineering Corporation and Reynolds Metals Company announced they would form a joint venture partnership to develop, produce, and sell gas-insulated systems for transmission of electric power. The venture, High Voltage Power Corporation, aimed to commercialize technology for underground electric power transmission. HVEC president Denis Robinson noted increasing need by bury transmission lines underground for technological, economic, and aesthetic reasons, and emphasizing that compressed gas offered unique advantages for transmitting large amounts of power at high voltages with increased reliability at lower cost. Each company held a 50% interest in the venture, with Reynolds providing funds and technical research while HVEC contributed its patents, licenses, and know-how. The development work was carried out at HVEC's Burlington factory.

The subsidiary's products included insulating-core reactors for nuclear power plants and gas-insulated transmission systems for electrical utilities, based on Van de Graaff's insulating-core transformer invention. However, by 1974, High Voltage Power Corp. losses were consuming 60-75% of HVEC's cash flow despite generating only $1.5-2 million in annual sales, leading HVEC to divest from the subsidiary.

== Legacy ==
=== Scientific instrumentation ===
HVEC represented a shift in how experimental physics acquired its tools. Before the company's founding, laboratories typically built accelerators from scratch; HVEC's mass-produced instruments made reliable high-voltage machines available to institutions without in-house engineering capacity. The result was a rapid expansion of experimental nuclear physics. At the field's peak in the mid-1970s, nearly 70 percent of published papers relied on data from HVEC accelerators.

Presidential science adviser D. Allan Bromley, who worked with the first HVEC tandem at Chalk River, called the machines "superb nuclear science instruments." In a 1984 assessment, he concluded that "of all the accelerators yet devised in nuclear science I believe that a very strong case can be made that the large tandems span the greatest range and scope of physics."

=== Accelerator mass spectrometry ===
HVEC tandems enabled accelerator mass spectrometry (AMS), a technique that transformed radiocarbon dating and created new applications across multiple fields.

In May 1977, researchers at the University of Rochester used an HVEC MP tandem to demonstrate that carbon-14 atoms could be detected directly in milligram-scale samples—compared to the 10–100 grams required by conventional decay counting. The tandem configuration exploited a key property: nitrogen-14, the primary interference in conventional dating, forms no stable negative ions and cannot survive acceleration through the system, eliminating a major source of contamination.

The reduction in sample size made radiocarbon dating applicable to precious artifacts and specimens where destructive sampling had been prohibitive. Tandem machines also extended the practical range of radiocarbon dating from approximately 40,000 to potentially 100,000 years. Beyond radiocarbon applications, AMS expanded into hydrology, geoscience, biomedicine, archaeology, and paleoclimatology.

=== Commercial applications ===
According to a 2010 survey, the three primary uses of the 26,000 low-energy particle accelerators operating worldwide are radiotherapy (44%), ion implantation (41%), and industrial processing (9%). HVEC made foundational contributions to all three.

The company's compact Van de Graaff generators were among the first artificial radiation sources commercially available for cancer treatment. Radiation physicist Milford Schulz called them "truly milestones in the progress of radiotherapy." The first medical linear accelerator—now the dominant technology in cancer treatment—was assembled at Stanford using a retrofitted HVEC machine.

Ion implantation, pioneered at HVEC's Ion Physics Corporation, became standard practice in semiconductor manufacturing by the late 1970s. The technique enabled MOS integrated circuits that dominate modern electronics. Radiation crosslinking, developed at Electronized Chemicals Corporation, produced heat-shrink tubing and films now ubiquitous in electrical wiring and food packaging.

=== Continuing research use ===
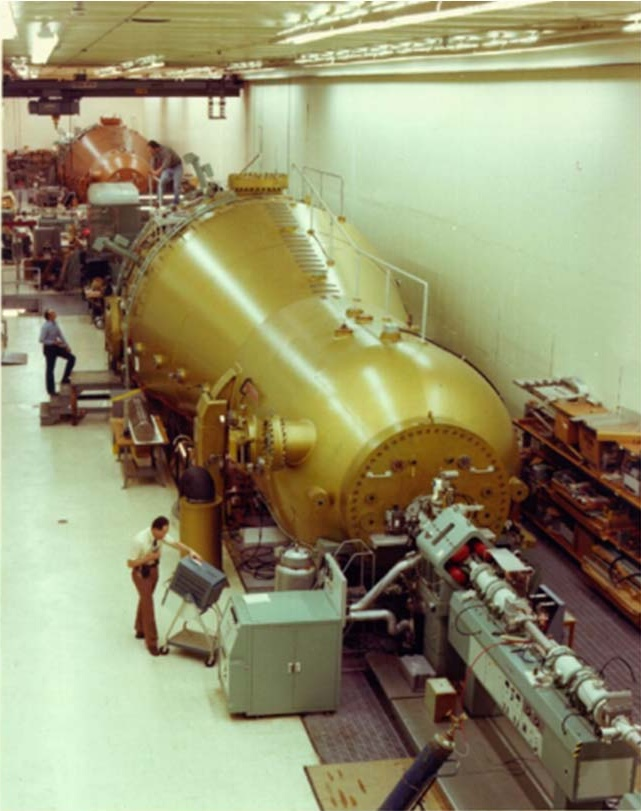
The MP tandem at Brookhaven

Although HVEC ceased accelerator production in 1981, many of its machines remain active in nuclear physics research. Several have operated continuously for more than 50 years. Beyond AMS, active accelerators are used for nuclear astrophysics (studying neutron-induced reactions relevant to stellar nucleosynthesis), ion beam analysis, radiation effects testing, and ion-atom collision physics. Four remain at U.S. national laboratories: Argonne, Brookhaven, Lawrence Livermore, and Sandia.

High Voltage Engineering Europa, the former Dutch subsidiary, continues manufacturing electrostatic accelerators for research and industrial applications.

== Sources ==
- Ante, Spencer E. (2008). Creative Capital: Georges Doriot and the Birth of Venture Capital. Cambridge, MA: Harvard Business School Press. ISBN 978-1-4221-0122-3.
- Bromley, D. Allan (1974). "The Development of Electrostatic Accelerators". Nuclear Instruments and Methods. 122: 1–34. Bibcode:1974NucIM.122....1B. doi:10.1016/0029-554X(74)90468-6.
- Bromley, D. Allan (1984). "High-Precision Studies with Large Tandem Accelerators". Il Nuovo Cimento A. 81 (1): 360–402. Bibcode:1984NCimA..81..360B. doi:10.1007/BF02724175.
- Burrill, E. Alfred (1967). "Van de Graaff: the man and his accelerators". Physics Today. 20 (2): 49–52. Bibcode:1967PhT....20b..49B. doi:10.1063/1.3034150.
- Dominguez, John R. (1974). Venture capital. Lexington, MA: Lexington Books. ISBN 978-0-669-86918-7.
- Fortune Magazine (April 1950). "Supervoltage Machines". Fortune. Vol. 41, no. 4. pp. 113–118, 120, 124.
- Gompers, Paul A. (1994). "The Rise and Fall of Venture Capital" (PDF). Business and Economic History. 23 (2).
- Hénon, Yves (2022). Radiation Processing Industry: The Early Years (PDF) (Report). International Irradiation Association.
- Hsu, David H.; Kenney, Martin (2005). "Organizing venture capital: the rise and demise of American Research & Development Corporation, 1946–1973" (PDF). Industrial and Corporate Change. 14 (4): 579–616. doi:10.1093/icc/dth064.
- Homan, Charles; Wolff, Michael (1969). "The Management Style of Denis M. Robinson". Innovation. No. 3. pp. 8–18.
- Hyder, H.R. McK; Hellborg, Ragnar (2005). "Electrostatic Accelerators – Production and Distribution" (PDF). In Hellborg, Ragnar (ed.). Electrostatic Accelerators: Fundamentals and Applications. Springer. pp. 595–603.
- Jamison, Douglas W.; Waite, Stephen R.; Anderson, Mark (2017). "Deep Science and the Evolution of American Venture Capital". Venture Investing in Science. Columbia University Press. doi:10.7312/jami17572. ISBN 978-0-231-54470-2. JSTOR 10.7312/jami17572.
- Lécuyer, Christophe; Brock, David C. (September 2009). "From nuclear physics to semiconductor manufacturing: the making of ion implantation". History and Technology. 25 (3): 193–217. doi:10.1080/07341510903083211.
- McKay, John W. (1999). Fifty years of accelerator based physics at Chalk River. AIP Conference Proceedings. Vol. 473. pp. 74–79. doi:10.1063/1.58975.
- McKay, John W. (2005). "History of the Electrostatic Accelerator". In Hellborg, Ragnar (ed.). Electrostatic Accelerators. Particle Acceleration and Detection. Springer-Verlag. pp. 52–63. doi:10.1007/3-540-27095-7_6. ISBN 3-540-23983-9.
- Metz, William D. (14 July 1972). "High Voltage Engineering: Accelerating Away from Science". Science. 177 (4044): 151–153. Bibcode:1972Sci...177..151M. doi:10.1126/science.177.4044.151. JSTOR 1734822. PMID 17779910.
- Morris, Edward (2015). "Georges F. Doriot: 1899–1987: Dream Builder". Wall Streeters: The Creators and Corruptors of American Finance. Columbia University Press. pp. 139–158. JSTOR 10.7312/morr17054.14.
- Nicholas, Tom (2019). "The Market Versus The Government". VC: An American History. Cambridge, MA: Harvard University Press. pp. 107–143. doi:10.4159/9780674240100-005.
- Owens, Larry (1990). "MIT and the Federal 'Angel': Academic R & D and Federal-Private Cooperation before World War II". Isis. 81 (2): 188–213. doi:10.1086/355334. JSTOR 233683.
- Rose, Peter H.; Wittkower, A.B. (1970). "Tandem Van de Graaff Accelerators". Scientific American. 223 (2): 24–33. Bibcode:1970SciAm.223b..24R. doi:10.1038/scientificamerican0870-24.
- Schulz, Milford D. (August 1975). "The Supervoltage Story". American Journal of Roentgenology. 124 (4): 541–559. doi:10.2214/ajr.124.4.540.
- Trump, John G. (December 1947). "Roentgen Rays against Cancer". The Technology Review. Vol. 50, no. 12. pp. 91–95 – via Internet Archive.
- Weinhous, Martin S; Brady, Luther W. (1996). "Developments in Technology" ( (PDF)). In Gagliardi, Raymond; Wilson, J. Frank (eds.). A History of the Radiological Sciences: Radiation Oncology. American Roentgen Ray Society. pp. 43–85. Archived from the original on 9 May 2015.
- Wittkower, Andrew; Ryding, Geoffrey (September 2018). Peter H. Rose — Father of Ion Implantation: The Early Years (PDF). 2018 22nd International Conference on Ion Implantation Technology (IIT). Würzburg, Germany. pp. 1–8. doi:10.1109/IIT.2018.8807959.
