= Matthew Astor Wilks =

American clubman

- Photograph of Wilks' mother-in-law, Wilks, and his wife, on his wedding day, 1909
- Born: March 3, 1844; New York City, U.S.
- Died: July 9, 1926 (aged 82); New York City, U.S.
- Spouse: Sylvia Ann Howland Green (m. 1909)
- Relatives: See Astor family

Matthew Astor Wilks (March 3, 1844 – July 9, 1926) was an American clubman who was prominent in New York society during the Gilded Age.

== Early life ==
Wilks was born in New York City on March 3, 1844. He was the one of seven children born to Matthew Wilks (1816–1899) and Eliza Astor (née Langdon) Wilks (1818–1896). His siblings included Elizabeth Wilks; Alice Eugenia Wilks, who married William Napier Keefer; Katherine Langdon Wilks; and Eugene Langdon Wilks, who married Marquerite R. Briquet. He spent part of his year in Galt, Ontario, in Canada, where his father had a 1,000 acre estate known as Cruickston Park and mansion designed by Detlef Lienau.

Through his mother, Wilks was great-grandson of America's first millionaire John Jacob Astor, the fur trader and real estate magnate. Among his first cousins were DeLancey Astor Kane, Woodbury Kane, S. Nicholson Kane, and John Jacob Astor IV. His father, an English gentleman, was the son of a reverend and was born in London.

== Career ==
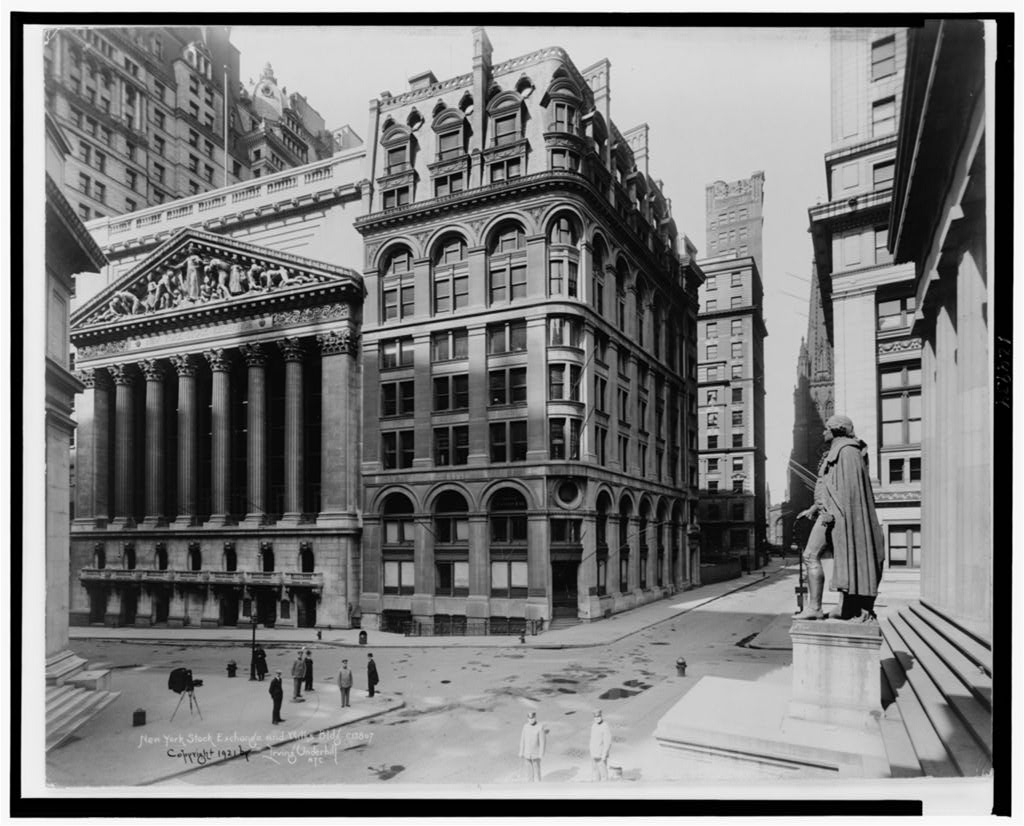
The New York Stock Exchange (left) and the Wilks Building (right), 1921.

Wilks, who inherited several million dollars from his family, began buying up property in lower Manhattan in 1876. He tore down the various mixed buildings and commissioned architect Charles W. Clinton to build a ten-story Italian Renaissance revival building, known as the Wilks Building, from 1889 to 1890 at 15 Wall Street in New York City. The building, located at the corner of Wall Street and Broad Street, was torn down in 1923 in order for its adjourning neighbor, the New York Stock Exchange, to expand into what became known as the New York Stock Exchange annex, designed by Trowbridge & Livingston.

=== Society life ===
In 1892, Wilks was included in Ward McAllister's "Four Hundred", purported to be an index of New York's best families, published in The New York Times. Conveniently, 400 was the number of people that could fit into Mrs. Astor's ballroom. Upon Caroline Schermerhorn Astor's death in 1908, Wilks was one of the pallbearers at her funeral.

Wilks, who was considered "a man of independent fortune" was a member of the University Club of New York, the Metropolitan Club, the Badminton Club, the Turf and Field Club, the Fencers Club, the Knickerbocker Club, the New York Yacht Club and the Automobile Club of America. He was considered one of the "society 'swells'" along with Lispenard Stewart and Elisha Dyer. Wilks and his wife were fond of the Opera and had a box at the Metropolitan Opera House, and had a home in Newport, Rhode Island.

== Personal life ==
On February 23, 1909, the then 63 year old Wilks was married to 38 year old Sylvia Ann Howland Green at St. Peter's Episcopal Church in Morristown, New Jersey. She was the only daughter of financier Hetty Howland Robinson, known as "the world's richest woman," and Edward Henry Green. Sylvia was the sister of businessman Edward Howland Robinson Green and the grandniece of Sylvia Ann Howland.

Wilks died on July 9, 1926, at his home, 7 West 81st Street in New York City. He was buried at Immanuel Cemetery in Bellows Falls, Vermont. His widow, who was then living at 998 Fifth Avenue, died on February 5, 1951, leaving an estate of $94,965,229 (approximately $1,178,365,000 today).
