= H. Sylvia A. H. G. Wilks =

History

New York City Fire Department
- Name: H. Sylvia A. H. G. Wilks
- Namesake: Harriet Sylvia Ann Howland Green Wilks
- Owner: New York City
- Operator: New York City Fire Department
- Builder: John A. Mathis Company
- Cost: $900,222
- Commissioned: January 17, 1958
- Out of service: 1970

General characteristics
- Class & type: fireboat
- Displacement: 292 tons
- Length: 105 ft (32 m)
- Speed: 13 knots (24 km/h)

The H. Sylvia A. H. G. Wilks was a fireboat operated by the Fire Department of New York City. The Wilks, and another fireboat, the Harry M. Archer, were both commissioned on January 17, 1958 built at the John A. Mathis Company shipyard. Both vessels were 105 feet (32 m) long, displaced 292 tons, and had a maximum speed of 13 knots (24 km/h). She cost $900,222.

The vessel's namesake donated $3 million to the Fire Department's Honor Emergency Fund.

The Wilks was taken out of service in 1970, where she was transferred to the New York City Department of Marine and Aviation. In 1990 she then became a tugboat known as the "Ervin S. Cooper".
