= Texas Midland Railroad =

Texas Midland Railroad (TM) was incorporated in Texas on December 1, 1892, by Hetty Green. The original standard gauge 52 mile line was built between Garrett and Midland Junction (also called Roberts) by the Houston and Texas Central Railroad in 1882. This original line was known as the Northeast Extension of the Houston and Texas Central. The line went bankrupt in 1885 and the Northeast Extension was sold at foreclosure on April 22, 1891, and became the Texas Central. This portion of the Texas Central was sold on October 27, 1892, to Hetty Green. Hetty Green sold the 52 mile railroad to the Texas Midland on January 27, 1893, and installed her son Edward Howland Robinson Green as president and General Manager. Headquarters city of the Texas Midland was Terrell, Texas. At start up the new company had five steam locomotives a 2-4-4, three 4-4-0s and a 4-6-0. Initial capitalization of the Texas Midland was $500,000. Over the next two decades Hetty Green invested some $1.8 million in the Texas Midland.

== Betterments and Extensions ==
In 1894 a new 4-4-0 was purchased from Schenectady Locomotive Works. A 19-mile extension was built from Roberts in Hunt County (just south of Quinlan) to Greenville in 1895. A new 4-4-0 was purchased from Baldwin Locomotive in 1896. On September 1, 1896, trackage rights were granted by the St. Louis Southwestern Railway from Greenville to Commerce. A 38-mile extension was completed between Commerce and Paris in 1897. When the line to Paris was completed the Texas Midland had 125 route miles. Schenectady built three 4-4-0s and nine 4-6-0s for the Texas Midland in 1897. Two 2-8-0s were purchased from Alco in 1913. In 1921 the Texas Midland built its own 14 mile line between Greenville and Commerce. A 1923 report in Poor's Railroads showed the Texas Midland owned 16 locomotives, 16 passenger cars and 183 freight cars.

== Traffic Base ==
The Texas Midland was part of a through route between St. Louis and Galveston. The line connected with the St. Louis-San Francisco Railroad at Paris and with the Houston and Texas Central at Ennis. A large portion of the freight traffic originated on the Texas Midland was cotton grown in the Blacklands Prairies region of East Texas.

== Innovations ==
The Texas Midland placed its first all steel box car in service in 1900. The Texas Midland was the first railroad to use burnt gumbo as ballast. Texas Midland passenger equipment was the most luxurious in Texas. The Texas Midland operated the first café lounge and observation sleepers in the southwest. President Green cooperated with the federal government in developing a model demonstration cotton farm near Terrell. This model farm was in response to the Boll Weevil infestation of the cotton crop. The farm taught better cultivation and promoted new varieties of cotton. President Green paid his freight solicitors on commission rather than salary. This practice ended when not approved by the Interstate Commerce Commission.

== Sale of Property ==
The Texas Midland was sold to the Southern Pacific Railroad on April 1, 1928. The Southern Pacific leased the Texas Midland to the Texas and New Orleans Railroad for operation. The Texas Midland was dissolved on June 30, 1934, when the Southern Pacific sold it to the Texas and New Orleans Railroad.

== Abandonments ==
The new 14 mile line built between Greenville and Commerce was abandoned in 1933. Trackage rights were again established over the St. Louis Southwestern between those two points. Texas State Highway 224 now occupies a majority of this abandoned ROW between Greenville and Commerce. The line between Ennis and Kaufman was abandoned in 1942. The line between Kaufman and Greenville was abandoned in 1958. In 1971, floods on the North Sulphur (M.P. 110.77) and Jernigan (M.P. 95.52) Rivers washed out several miles of trackage on what was called the Paris Branch. Formal abandonment of this line was completed in 1975. A portion of track was left in place from Mile Post 86.79 (beginning of Paris Branch) in Commerce east to Mile Post 93.50 near Horton and utilized for car storage into the early 1980s. The rails were then removed east of Hunt County Road 4513 leaving a short stub in Commerce that was reconnected directly to the former St. Louis Southwestern C-branch main line track and is still utilized as a car storage track by the Blacklands Railroad.

== Preservation ==
Some Texas Midland trackage remains in Commerce that is used by the Blacklands Railroad for freight car storage. Former Texas Midland trackage also exists in Ennis, Greenville, and Terrell as spurs serving local industry. Track is still down on a spur in Paris that led to the old compress. The Texas Midland Freight Depot remains in Commerce. The Texas Midland depot in Cooper is now the Patterson Memorial Delta County Museum. The Texas Midland depot in Rosser is extant. Texas Midland passenger car #993 is preserved in Terrell. The Texas Midland freight depot is still standing in Terrell. It is located below the Highway 34 bridge, about 100 yards south of the Texas and Pacific (now Union Pacific) main line.
