= Round Hill (Dartmouth, Massachusetts) =

Hill in Dartmouth, Massachusetts, United States

Coordinates: 41.54°N 70.93°W

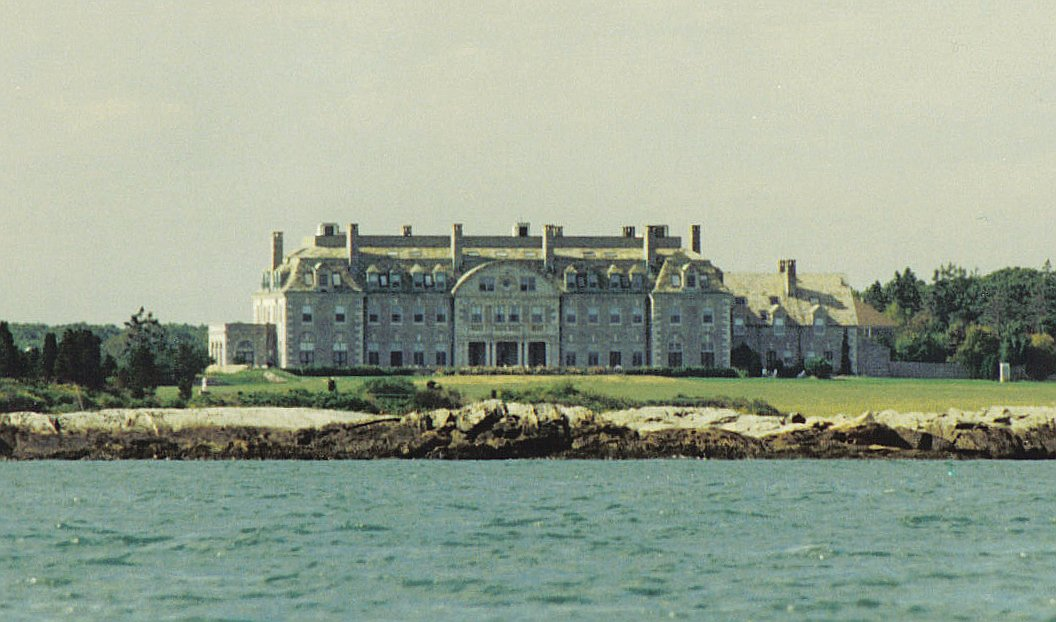
Colonel Green's Mansion at Round Hill with Buzzards Bay in the foreground.

Round Hill, originally called Hap's Hill, is a location in Dartmouth, Massachusetts of historical significance, which eventually became a gated community.

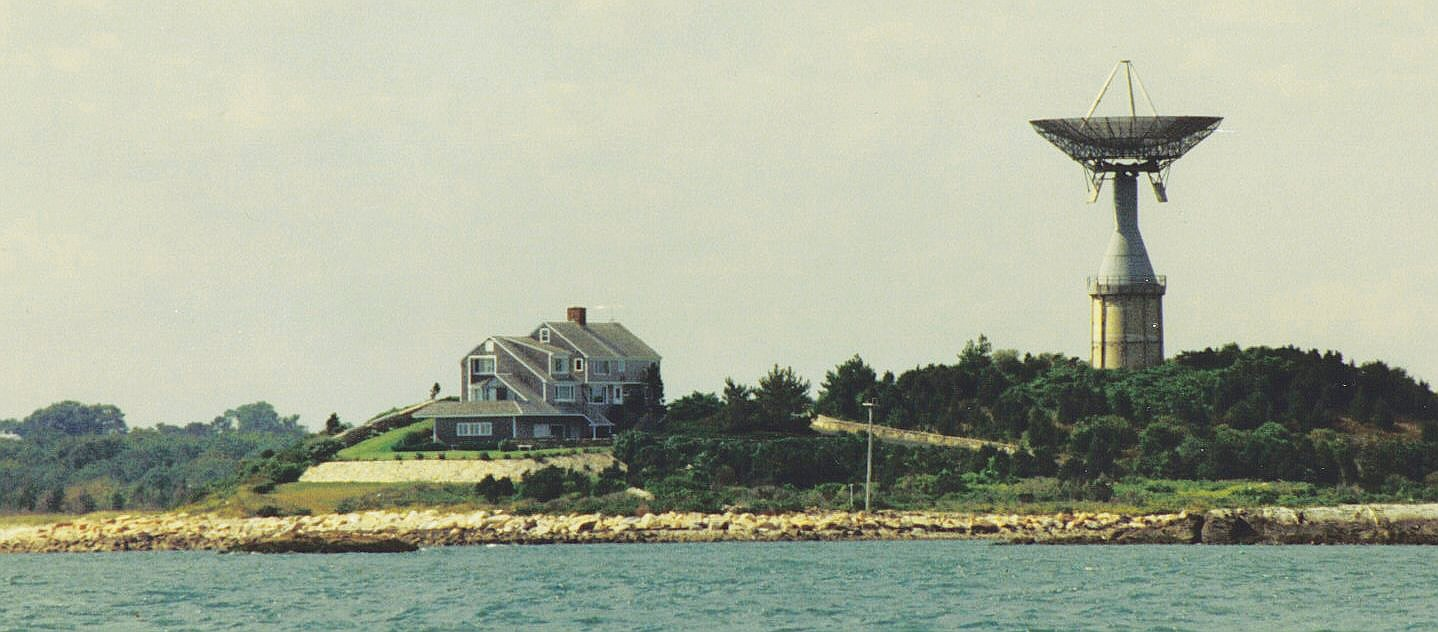
The MIT radio telescope on top of a water tank as they appeared in 2000, with Buzzards Bay in the foreground.

== Early European settlement ==
The first historical description of the hill was by Gabriel Archer, who kept a record of the 1602 expedition of Bartholomew Gosnold from Falmouth, Cornwall to what was then known as Northern Virginia. On May 25, 1602 (o.s.), the vessel Concord having first entering Buzzards Bay (which the crew called Gosnolls Hope) from Vineyard Sound, they determined to make the west side of on an islet within Cuttyhunk Island their settlement.

From that island Archer saw the a hill on the mainland which he called "Hap's Hill," "for that I hope much hap may be expected from it." On May 31, Captain Gosnold sailed to the mainland, anchored and came ashore. There he was welcomed by native men, women and children "who with all courteous kindnesse entertayned him …," presenting him with furs (thought valuable by Archer), tobacco, turtles, hemp, chains and other ornaments. The landing party explored the coast finding it to be, in the words of Archer, "the goodliest continent that ever we saw, promising more by farre than we any way did expect … ."

Exploring the coast they discovered Hap's Island between two inlets. On the basis of the description, Hurd determined that what Archer called Hap's Hill was later referred to as Round Hill.

== Round Hill estate ==
Edward Howland Robinson Green, known as "Colonel" Ned Green, the only son of the renowned female tycoon and miser, Hetty Green, built his home on Round Hill after his mother's death in 1916 left him and his sister with a fortune of between $100 and $200 million. The mansion was designed by architect Alfred C. Bossom and completed in 1921 at a cost of $1.5 million.

== MIT Round Hill Research Station ==
=== Radio research and WMAF ===
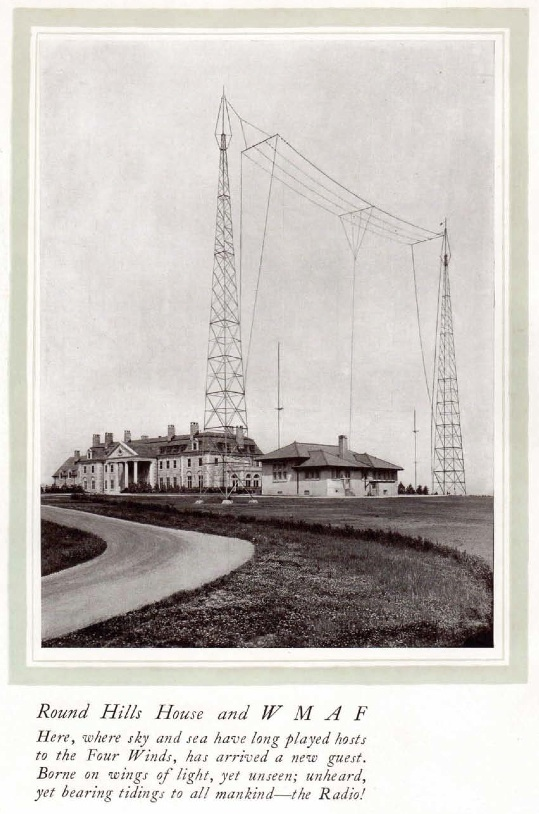
Photo of Green's house, with the WMAF antenna in the foreground

Col. Green had an early fascination with radio technology, dating back to the 1890s. In June 1922, the Round Hills Radio Corporation was incorporated under a Massachusetts charter, with Colonel Green the company president. To support the radio operations, a building containing a broadcast studio plus laboratory rooms was constructed adjacent to the estate's main building. In September 1922, the Round Hills Radio Corporation received licenses for a broadcasting station, WMAF, in addition to one for experimental work, with the call sign 1XV. The broadcasting station, which was operated only during the summer months of 1923–1928, adopted the slogan The Voice from Way Down East.

MIT's President, Samuel W. Stratton and the Department of Electrical Engineering's new Communications Division were invited to experiment with the new technology, and the department was initially financed by Green. Professor Edward L. Bowles set out to determine the signal strength and radiation patterns of different antenna arrays in 1926. Round Hill's radio station (which included an early radio telescope, built atop a water tower designed to look like the foundation of a lighthouse) followed Donald B. MacMillan's and Admiral Richard E. Byrd's polar expeditions, tracked the Graf Zeppelin dirigible during its maiden transatlantic flight, and was the sole communication link for areas devastated by the Vermont floods in 1927.

=== Round Hill Van de Graaff generator ===
In 1933, Round Hill was the site of a large-scale generator designed by Robert J. Van de Graaff and his students. Van de Graaff had been brought to MIT from Princeton in 1931 to develop a high voltage research facility. He built a 40-foot (12 m) tall Van de Graaff generator in an abandoned airship hangar on Round Hill. The purpose was to provide the energy to accelerate subatomic particles to bombard atomic nuclei. The machine became operational in December 1933. It was capable of operating at 5,000,000 volts. After it became obsolete, the generator was donated in 1956 to the Museum of Science, Boston, and circa 2011 the generator continues to function as a major exhibit.

=== Sale to MIT ===
In 1948, twelve years after the Colonel's death, his sister Sylvia Green, his heir, donated the entire property to the Massachusetts Institute of Technology (MIT), which used the 240-acre (0.97 km^{2}) estate for educational and military purposes until 1964. MIT erected a giant antenna atop a 50,000-gallon water tank on the site. Another was erected nearby for research towards the Ballistic Missile Early Warning System. The giant dish antenna stood as a local and marine navigational landmark until the current owners of the site, the Bevelaqua family, demolished it in 2007.

In 1964 MIT sold the estate to the Society of Jesus of New England. It adapted the mansion as a religious retreat center. Its upper floors were converted into 64 individual rooms, and its main floor reworked to include a chapel, conference rooms, and library. In 1968 the Jesuits sold much of the estate's beach to the Town of Dartmouth. In 1970 it sold the entire property to Gratia R. Montgomery, a local woman. In 1981 she sold most of the site to private developers. They developed it as a private, gated condominium community.

=== Charles W. Morgan ===
The New Bedford whaling ship Charles W. Morgan, now on display at Mystic Seaport, was once owned in part by Colonel Green, and moored at Round Hill.

=== World War II ===
During World War II, the Coast Artillery built a fire control structure on the site. This site was known as the Mishaum Point Military Reservation.

== Recent developments ==
In 2007 the property was sold for around $8.5 million. The town's Historical Commission tried and failed to save the antenna. On November 19, 2007, the antenna was demolished by the new owner, who planned to build a new home on the site. The tower had stood for 90 years, and had been a navigational landmark.

== See also ==
- Round Hill School, founded 1823

== References and sources ==
=== Sources ===
- Archer, Gabriel (1843). "The Relation of Captain Gosnold's Voyage t the North part of Virginia, begun the sixth-and twentieth of March, Anno 42 Elizabethae Reginae, 1602, and delivered by Gabriel Archer, a gentleman in the said voyage". Collections of the Massachusetts Historical Society. 3. 8: 72–81. The book was first published in Purchas 1625, pp. IV:1647–51.
- Hurd, D. Hamilton, ed. (1883). History of Bristol County, Massachusetts: With Biographical Sketches ..., Part 1. Philadelphia: J.W. Lewis & Co. LCCN 01012138.
- Levermore, Charles Herbert, ed. (1912). Forerunners and Competitors of the Pilgrims and Puritans: or, Narratives of Voyages Made by Persons Other than the Pilgrims and Puritans of the Bay Colony to the Shores of New England during the First Quarter of the Seventeenth Century, 1601–1625, with Especial Reference to the Labors of Captain John Smith in Behalf of the Settlement of New England. Vol. 1. Brooklyn, New York: The Society [New England Society of Brooklyn]. LCCN a17000511.
- Purchas, Samuel, ed. (1625). Hakluytus posthumus, or, Purchas his Pilgrimes. Contayning a history of the world, in sea voyages, & lande-travells, by Englishmen and others …. London: Imprinted for H. Fetherston. The original imprint was "In fower parts, each containing five bookes." All four volumes are hosted online by the Library of Congress The 1905–07 facsimile reproduction (Glasgow: J. MacLehose and sons), in 20 volumes (one for each of the "bookes") is hosted online by HathiTrust.
