= Sylvia Wilks =

American wealthy woman

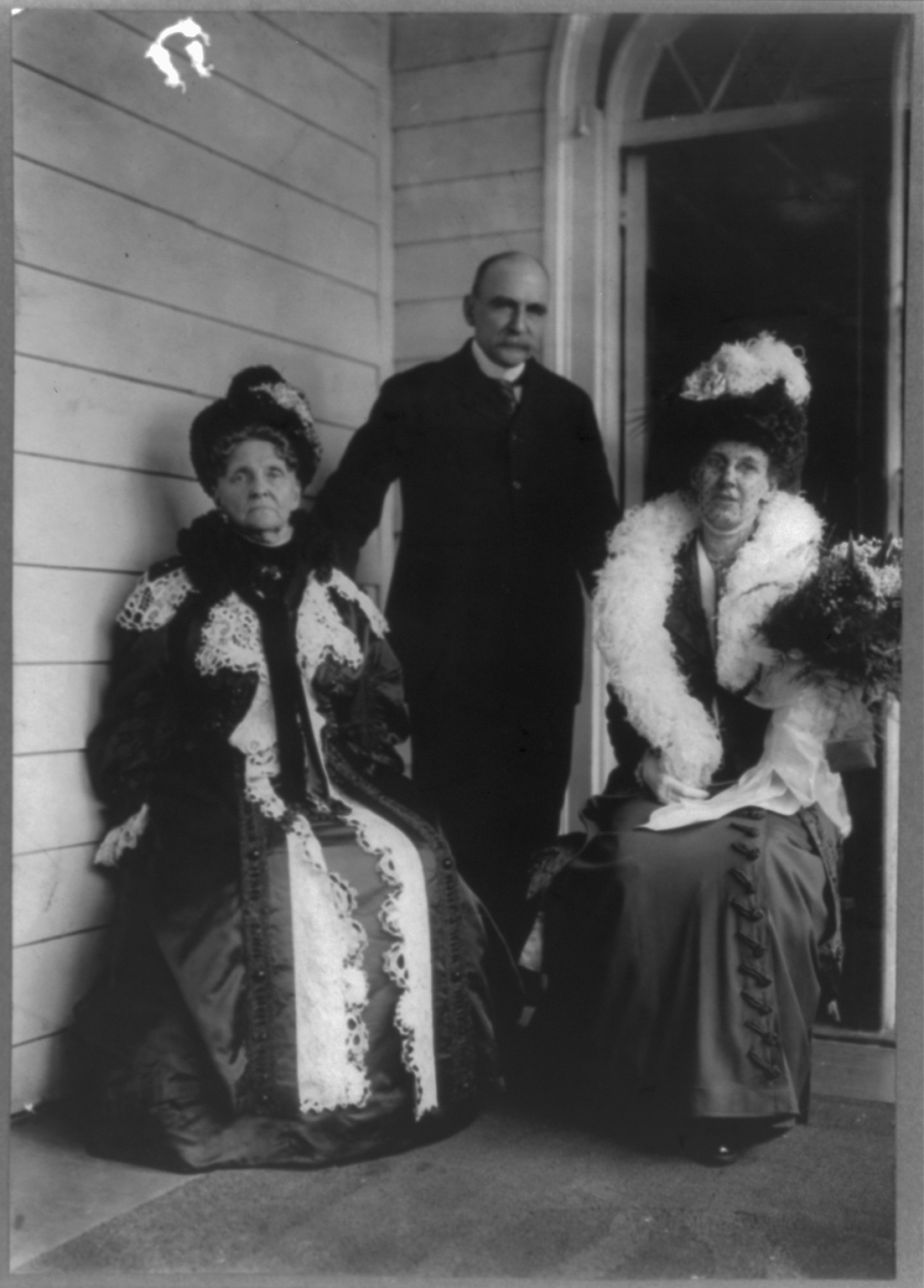
- Sylvia (right) on her wedding day with her mother (left) and her husband Matthew Astor Wilks (center).
- Born: Harriet Sylvia Ann Howland Green; January 7, 1871; London, England
- Died: February 5, 1951 (aged 80); New York City, U.S.
- Spouse: Matthew Astor Wilks (m. 1909; died 1926)
- Mother: Hetty Green
- Relatives: Edward Howland Robinson Green (brother); Sylvia Ann Howland (grand-aunt)

Harriet Sylvia Ann Howland Robinson Green Wilks (January 7, 1871 – February 5, 1951) was one of the wealthiest women in the United States.

== Early life ==
Harriet Sylvia Ann Howland Robinson Green was born in London, England on January 7, 1871. Although named Harriet after her mother, she was known as Sylvia throughout her lifetime. She was the daughter of Hetty Howland (née Robinson) Green and Edward Henry Green. Her only sibling was a brother, businessman Edward Howland Robinson Green.

== Personal life ==
On February 23, 1909, Sylvia, then 38 years old, was married to 63-year-old Matthew Astor Wilks (1844–1926) in Morristown, New Jersey. Wilks was a great-grandson of America's first millionaire John Jacob Astor. Although Wilks was worth approximately $2,000,000 in his own right, her mother insisted that they have a prenuptial agreement waiving his right to inherit Sylvia's fortune. When her brother died in 1936, she inherited his estate, rather than the estate going to his widow.

Her husband died on July 9, 1926, at his home, 7 West 81st Street in New York City. He was buried at Immanuel Cemetery in Bellows Falls, Vermont.

Sylvia, who was then living at 998 Fifth Avenue, died at New York Hospital on February 5, 1951, and was buried alongside her husband at Immanuel Cemetery in Vermont. She left an estate valued at $94,965,229 (approximately $1,178,365,000 today). The list of assets included 36 pages of bonds, eight pages of blue-chip stocks, and $31 million in a non-interest bearing checking account.

=== Estate ===
Her will was found stuffed in a tin cabinet with four cakes of soap. She bestowed just $5,000 on her closest genetic relative, a cousin, but the court awarded her $140,000 during probate. The remainder was divided between 63 charities and educational institutions.

Wilks donated $3 million to the FDNY's Honor Emergency Fund. In 1958 the Fire Department commissioned a new $900,222 fireboat named in her honor.

== See also ==
- Howland will forgery trial
