= Round Hill Airport =

- IATA: none; ICAO: none

Summary
- Operator: Private
- Location: Dartmouth, Massachusetts
- Built: Unknown
- In use: 1927-1936
- Occupants: Private
- Elevation AMSL: 6 ft / 2 m
- Coordinates: 41°32′32.02″N 70°56′15.19″W
- Interactive map of Round Hill Airport

Round Hill Airport was an airfield operational from 1927-1936. The airfield was described as being located on land owned by Edward Howland Robinson Green in Dartmouth, Massachusetts.
