= Texas and New Orleans Railroad =

American rail company

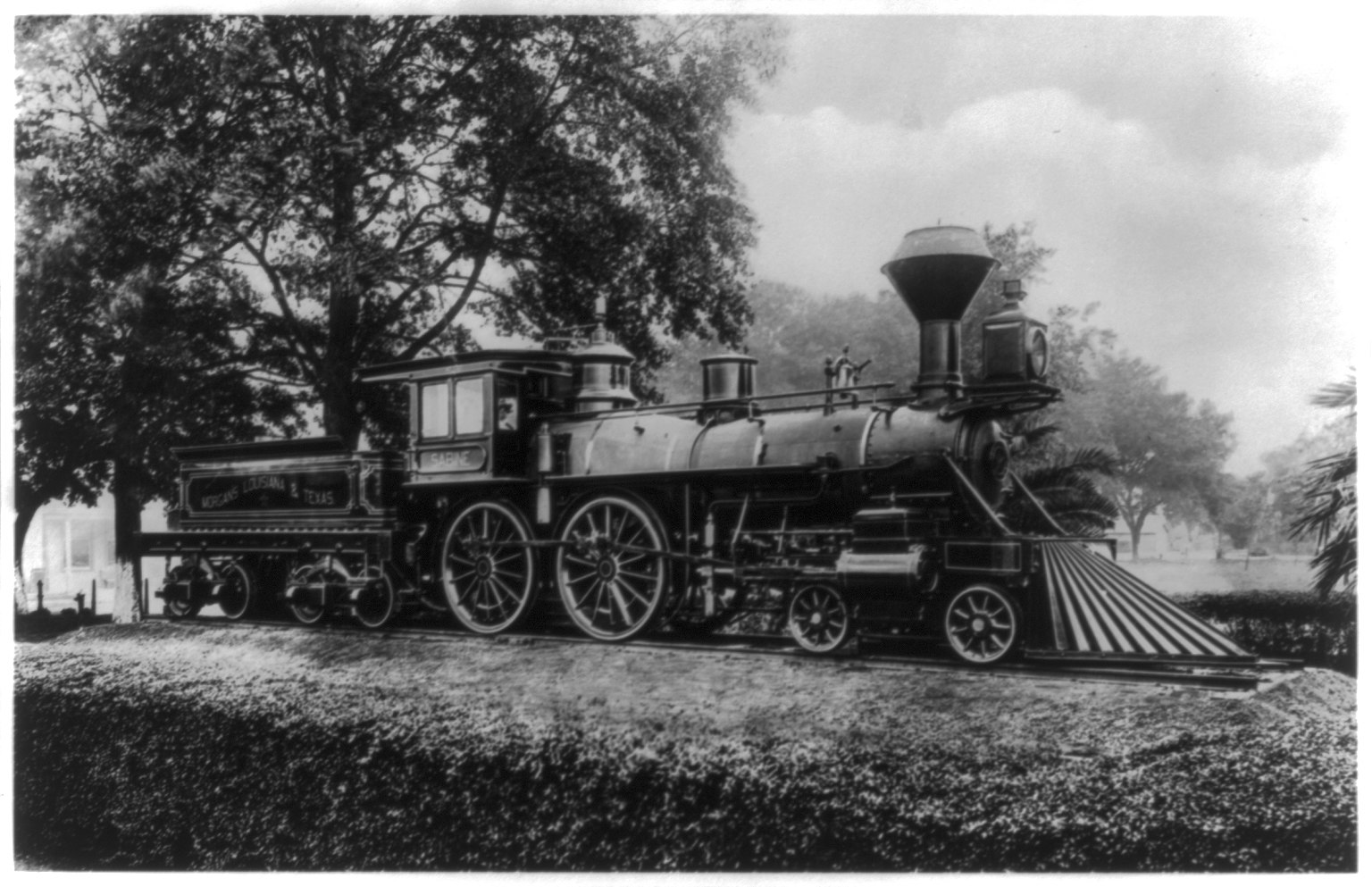
- Locomotive Sabine of Morgan's Louisiana & Texas line

Overview
- Headquarters: Houston, Texas
- Founders: William Fields; Abram M. Gentry; George W. Smyth
- Reporting mark: TNO
- Locale: Texas and Louisiana
- Dates of operation: 1856; 169 years ago– 1961; 64 years ago
- Successor: Southern Pacific Railroad

Technical
- Track gauge: 4 ft 8 1/2 in (1,435 mm) standard gauge
- Previous gauge: 5 ft 6 in (1,676 mm) until 1876

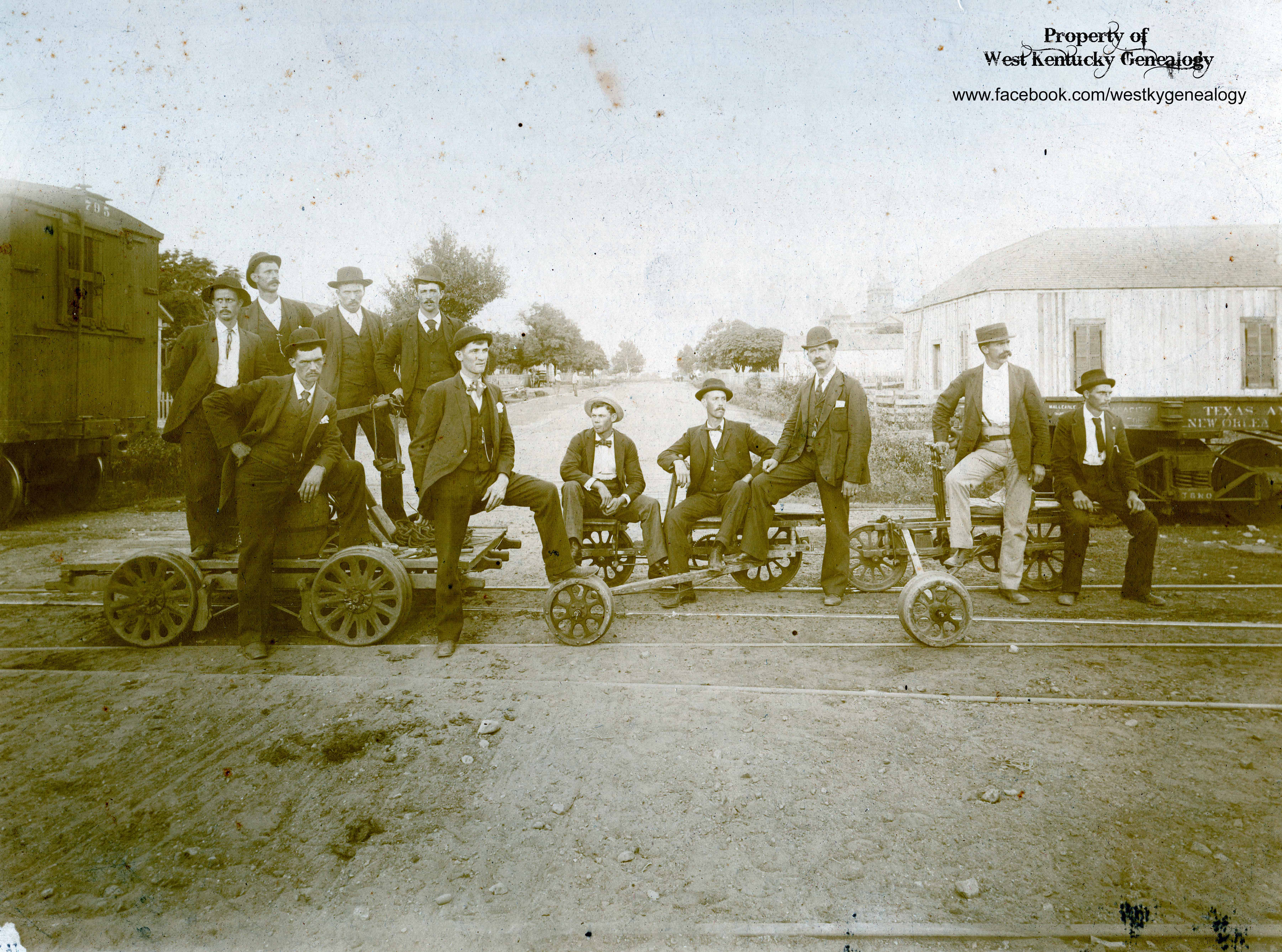
Photo is of several gentlemen on the Texas & New Orleans RR carts on the tracks. Photo dated about 1900 to 1910.

The Texas and New Orleans Railroad (reporting mark TNO) was an American rail company in Texas and Louisiana. It operated 3,713 miles (5,975 km) of railroad in 1934; by 1961, 3,385 miles (5,448 km) remained when it merged with parent company Southern Pacific (SP).

== Morgan's Louisiana and Texas Railroad ==
The Morgan's Louisiana and Texas Railroad was a partly double-track, standard-gauge, steam railroad, situated entirely within the State of Louisiana. The main line extended from Algiers, on the Mississippi River opposite New Orleans, to Lafayette, where it connected with the line of the Louisiana Western Railroad Company. It formed an important link in the through route of the Southern Pacific Company between New Orleans and San Francisco. The principal branch lines extended from Lafayette to the Mississippi River opposite Baton Rouge, from Lafayette to Cheneyville, from Breaux Bridge to Port Barre, from Breaux Bridge to Cade, and from Thibodaux Junction to Napoleonville. There were a number of other branch lines of an average length of about 10 miles, which served the numerous sugar plantations along parts of the line.

== History ==
=== Early history: 1856–1880 ===
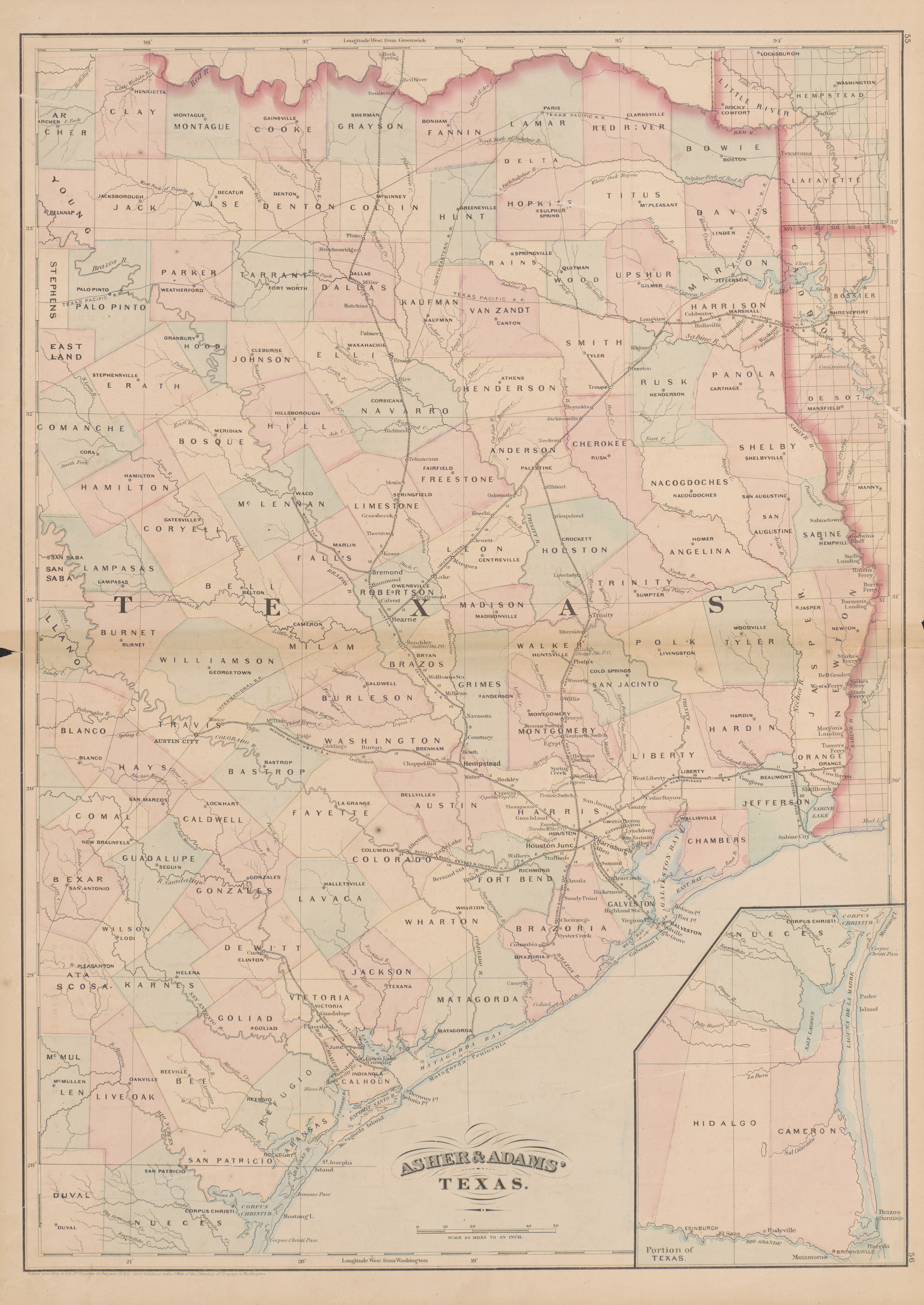
1871 map showing the Texas and New Orleans Railroad in Texas, along with other railroads

The Texas and New Orleans Railroad was chartered as the Sabine and Galveston Bay Railroad and Lumber Company in 1856, and was formed to build a railroad from Madison (now Orange) in Orange County to tidewater at Galveston Bay. Groundbreaking was on August 27, 1857 outside Houston and real construction work began in April 1858. Shortly thereafter some work was transferred to Beaumont and railroad construction went east and west. By this time many people started to figure out the builders of the railroad wanted to see a railroad connecting Houston with New Orleans.

In the following year rails and equipment were ordered and received. By 1860, 30 miles (48 km) of right-of-way was graded and 12 miles (19 km) of track was laid. In late 1859, the name of the railroad was changed to the Texas and New Orleans Railroad Company. By early 1861, track was laid for 80 miles (130 km) west of Beaumont and the trackage to Houston was complete.

In spring 1862, the President of the Railway, Abram M. Gentry, stated that the 110-mile (180 km) line from Houston to Orange was open, but some of the track was temporary for military needs due to the Civil War. Scheduled service was operated from Houston to Orange from 1862 to mid-1863 and irregular service until early 1864. Work on the line to Louisiana continued until New Orleans was captured.

The Trinity River Bridge washed out in 1867 and the Texas and New Orleans continued to offer service between Houston and Beaumont until spring 1868, at which time the company was forced into receivership. From 1870 to 1871, limited service operated between Houston and West Liberty until the railroad was sold. The purchaser was John F. Terry of the New York banking firm of J. S. Kennedy and Company. A new Texas and New Orleans Railroad company was chartered in 1874 and Terry was named president.

The first train from Houston to Orange in over a decade ran in late 1876. It was during this time the railroad was converted from 5 ft 6 in (1,676 mm) to 4 ft 8 1/2 in (1,435 mm) standard gauge. In 1878, the Texas and New Orleans, Charles Morgan's Louisiana and Texas Railroad and Steamship Company, and the Louisiana Western Railroad Company reached an agreement and the line was finished from Orange to New Orleans. The Louisiana Western Extension Railroad Company was chartered in Texas to build from Orange to the Louisiana boundary and the first through train ran from Houston to New Orleans on August 30, 1880.

=== Expansion: 1881–1920 ===
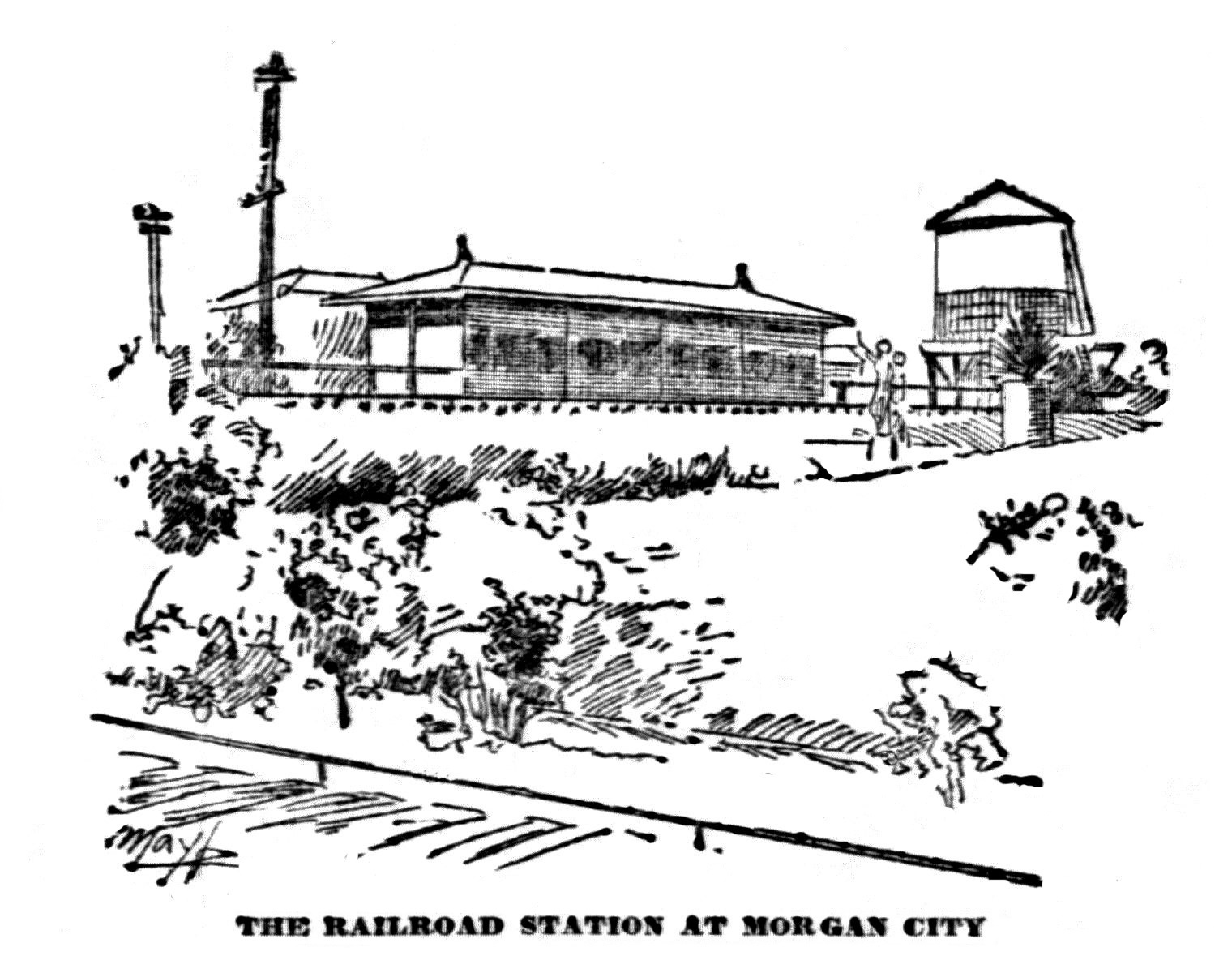
Railroad Station at Morgan City, Louisiana (1893)

In 1881, C. P. Huntington, acting for the Southern Pacific Railroad Company, bought the Texas and New Orleans as well as many other railroads in the southern United States. As a result of this acquiring of railroads by Southern Pacific, The Texas and New Orleans Railroad found itself as part of a major transcontinental route. In 1882, The T&NO made over $1,500,000 and owned 36 locomotives as well as over 1000 pieces of rolling stock. Also in 1882, the T&NO acquired the 103-mile (166 km) Sabine and East Texas Railway Company. Many more companies were merged into T&NO from 1880 to 1900. In the early years of the 20th century The Texas and New Orleans built over 160 miles (260 km) of track, much of it between Cedar and Rockland, opening up a through route from Dallas to Beaumont. In 1921, the Texas State Railroad was leased in.

=== 1921–1961 ===
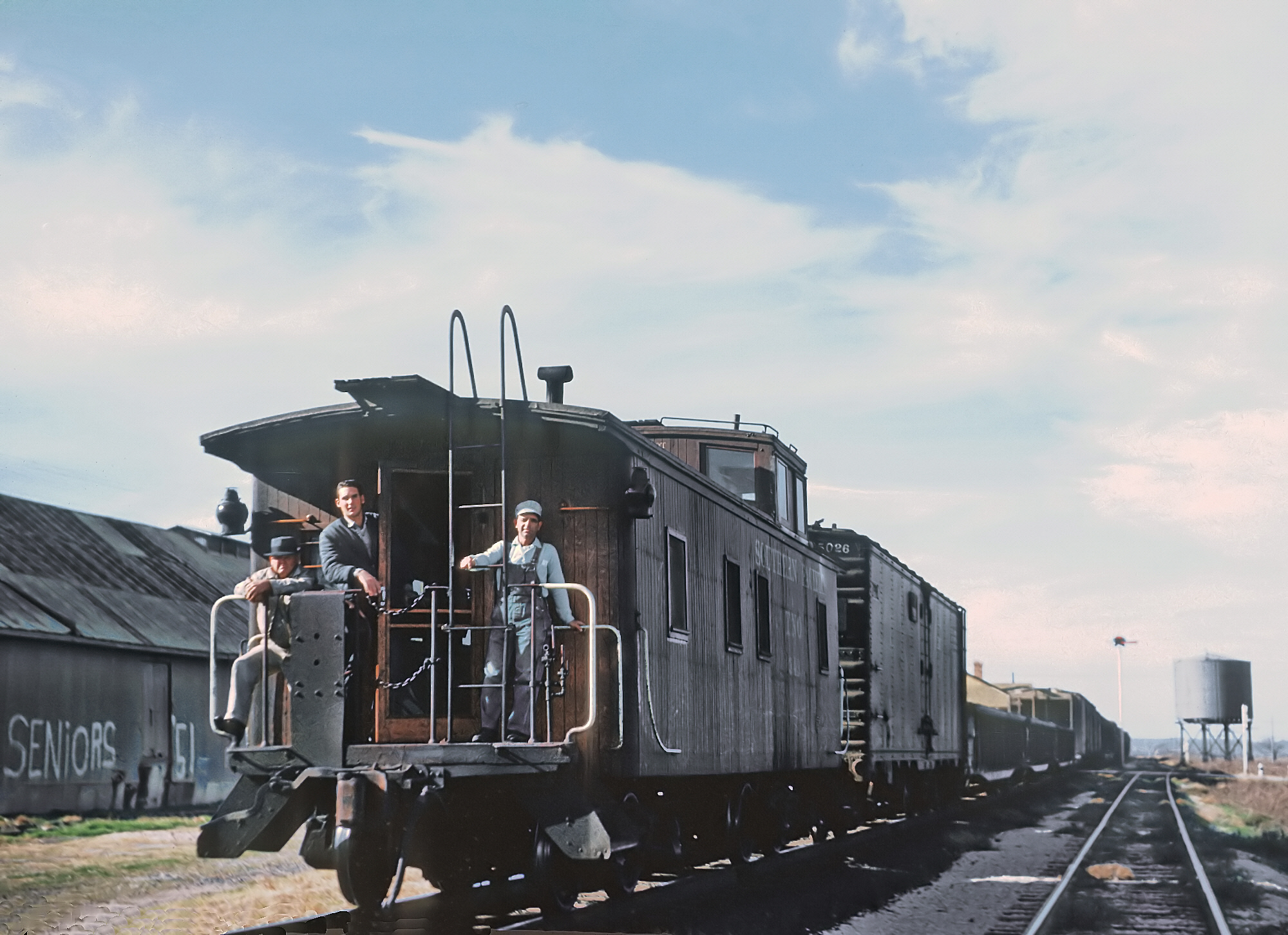
Texas and New Orleans RR train crew on a caboose at LaCoste, TX in 1960

At the end of 1925, T&NO operated 545 miles of railroad; to simplify SP's corporate holdings T&NO leased the other Texas-Louisiana SP lines in 1927, including:

- Dayton-Goose Creek Railway Company
- Franklin and Abbeville Railway
- Galveston, Harrisburg and San Antonio Railway
- Houston and Shreveport Railroad
- Houston and Texas Central Railway
- Houston East and West Texas Railway
- Iberia and Vermilion Railroad
- Lake Charles and Northern Railroad
- Louisiana Western Railroad
- Morgan's Louisiana and Texas Railroad and Steamship Co
- San Antonio and Aransas Pass Railway
- Texas Midland Railroad

In 1934, all of these were merged into T&NO, making it the largest Texas railroad with 3,713 miles (5,975 km) of road (not all in Texas). On November 1, 1961, the remaining 3,385 miles (5,448 km) merged into the Southern Pacific and the T&NO ceased to exist.

== Named trains ==
Named passenger trains operated on T&NO rails included:

- Sunset Limited (New Orleans to Los Angeles)
- Argonaut (New Orleans to Los Angeles)
- Sunbeam (Houston to Dallas)
- Hustler (Houston to Dallas)
- Owl (Houston to Dallas)
- Border Limited (Houston to Brownsville)
- Rabbit (Houston to Shreveport)
- Alamo (San Antonio to New Orleans)
