= Harry M. Archer =

Surgeon and inventor (1868–1954)

Harry Mortimer Archer
- Born: April 23, 1868; Manhattan, New York, U.S.
- Died: May 17, 1954 (aged 86); Manhattan, New York, U.S.
- Burial place: Sleepy Hollow Cemetery
- Occupation: surgeon
- Known for: invented surgical instruments for treating the victims of fire

Harry Mortimer Archer (April 23, 1868 – May 17, 1954) was a professor of Medicine, and the chief surgeon of the Fire Department of New York City. Following his death a letter to The New York Times, from Richard C. Patterson Jr., one of his colleagues, described how Archer had attended every fire in the city for seventy-five years. Patterson wrote that Archer had found drugs that helped the victims of smoke inhalation, and had developed special surgical tools for treating the victims of fires.

Archer attended fires most of his life, even before he earned his medical degree from the Bellevue College Medical School, in 1894. He continued attending, almost all his adult life, into his 80s. It was not uncommon for Archer to make it to fire scenes before the firefighters. His attendance was voluntary, although the department honored him, with honorary titles. Archer took risks to provide medical care to fire fighters and fire victims, and received multiple awards for valor. In 1920 the Department created an award, in his name, that was given to other brave men and women. was recognized, for his dedication.

In 1958 the city honored Archer by naming a fireboat after him.

There is an area of the Phoenix's Hall of Flame Fire Museum devoted to Archer, and his medical innovations.
