= Hetty Green =

American financier (1834–1916)

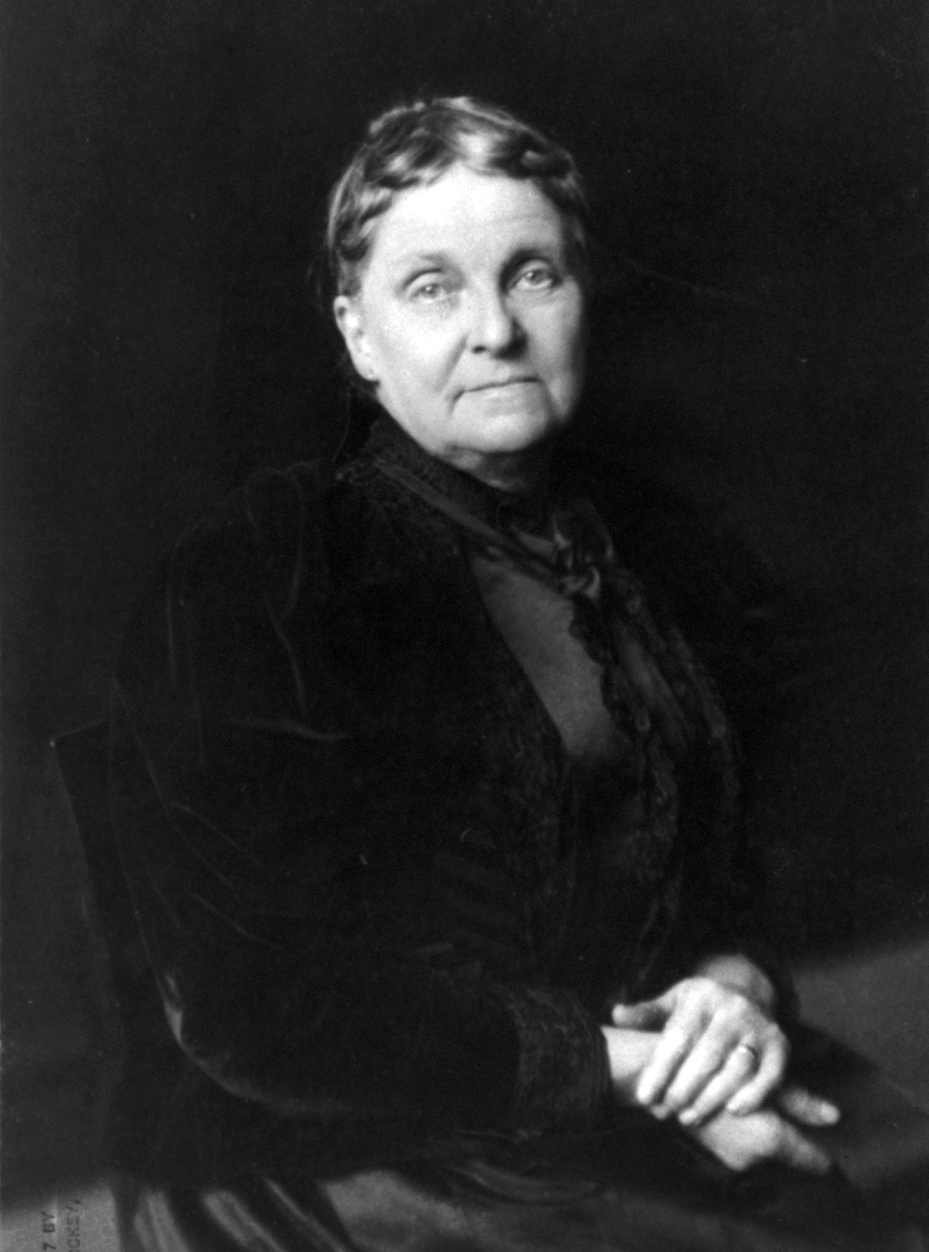
- Green in 1897
- Born: Henrietta Howland Robinson; November 21, 1834; New Bedford, Massachusetts, U.S.
- Died: July 3, 1916 (aged 81); New York City, U.S.
- Resting place: Immanuel Cemetery, Bellows Falls, Vermont, U.S.
- Education: Eliza Wing School
- Occupation: Financier
- Known for: Financial prowess, miserly conduct
- Spouse: Edward Henry Green (m. 1867; died 1902)
- Children: Edward; Harriet
- Relatives: Sylvia Ann Howland (aunt)

Henrietta "Hetty" Howland Robinson Green (November 21, 1834 – July 3, 1916) was an American businesswoman and financier known as "the richest woman in America" during the Gilded Age. Those who knew her well referred to her admiringly as the "Queen of Wall Street" due to her willingness to lend freely and at reasonable interest rates to financiers and city governments during financial panics. Her extraordinary discipline during such times enabled her to amass a fortune as a financier at a time when nearly all major financiers were men.

As a highly successful investor, with a Wall Street office, she was unusual for being a woman in a man's world. Unwilling to participate in New York City high society, conspicuous consumption, or business partnerships, she may have been eccentric and curt with the press but she was a pioneer of value investing. Her willingness to make low-rate loans (with her well-tended reserves of currency) in place of the failing banks during the Panic of 1907 helped bail out Wall Street, New York City, and the United States economy. Nonetheless, she was seen in her widowhood as an odd miser all in black, sometimes referred to sensationally as the "Witch of Wall Street", and later the Guinness Book of World Records even named her the "greatest miser" for a time. Stories that were often cited include her refusal to buy expensive clothes or pay for hot water, and her habit of wearing a single dress that was replaced only when it was worn out. Later evaluations have seen her as perhaps eccentric, but mostly out of step with the excesses of the Gilded Age wealthy, and the contemporary expectations for women, especially of her class.

== Birth and early years ==
=== Early childhood ===
Henrietta ("Hetty") Howland Robinson was born in 1834 in New Bedford, Massachusetts, the daughter of Edward Mott Robinson and Abby Howland, the richest whaling family in the city. Her family members were Quakers who owned a large whaling fleet and also profited from the China trade. She had a younger brother who died as an infant.

At the age of two, Green was sent to live with her grandfather, Gideon Howland, and her Aunt Sylvia. Green would read the stock quotations and commerce reports for her grandfather and picked up some of his business methods. At the age of 10, she entered Eliza Wing's boarding school in Sandwich, Massachusetts. Green's father became the head of the Isaac Howland whaling firm upon Gideon's death, and she began to emulate her father's business practices. Because of Gideon's influence and that of her father, and possibly because her mother was constantly ill, she was close to her father and was reading financial papers to him by the age of six. Green learned to read ledgers and trade commodities. When she was 13, Green became the family bookkeeper. She accompanied her father to the countinghouses, storerooms, commodities traders, and stockbrokers. In the evening, she read him the news.

=== Early adulthood ===
In her late teens, Green attended multiple boarding schools and finishing schools, such as the Friends Academy and Anna Cabot Lowell's finishing school. Simultaneously, she assisted her father with the management of the family business. The unifying theme throughout this period of her life was her unapologetic rejection of societal norms established for women at the time — especially wealthy heiresses. Green cared little for her appearance, preferring to dress in old clothes, and she disregarded the daily primping practiced by young women. Green's behavior frustrated her mother and Aunt Sylvia because they feared what the future would hold for a wealthy heiress who felt more at home on the docks of New Bedford than mingling with members of her class.

When Green turned 20 years old, her Aunt Sylvia pressured her to find a spouse. Reluctantly, Green moved to New York to live with a cousin of her mother's, Henry Grinnell. During her time in New York, she mingled with the upper crust of New York society and attended many lavish balls but she expressed little interest in finding a husband. Instead, she spent much of her time eavesdropping on men as they discussed the latest Wall Street dramas. Her relatives were exasperated when she returned several months early to New Bedford with no wedding prospects. Her father was the only person unable to contain his delight when he learned that Green had spent only $200 out of her $1,200 budget, investing the remainder in high-quality bonds.

=== Adulthood and marriage ===
Within a few years of her return to New Bedford, Green's father exited the whaling business and relocated to New York City. His exit was well-timed, as the use of petroleum virtually eliminated the demand for whale oil within a few years. Green spent the next six years shuttling between New York City and New Bedford. Her priority in New York was assisting her father with new business and investment activities, while her priority in New Bedford was pestering her Aunt Sylvia to ensure that she remained the sole beneficiary of her will. The constant fights over her Aunt Sylvia's will led to a drawn-out court battle, which haunted Green for the remainder of her life. Green's mother, Abby Robinson, died on February 21, 1860, but her $100,000 estate went to her husband, except for an $8,000 (equivalent to $287,000 in 2025) house for Green.

While residing in New York City, Hetty met her future husband, Edward Henry Green of Vermont. By the age of 44, Edward was a partner in Russell Sturgis & Company and had become a millionaire in his own right from his business endeavors in the Far East. Her father encouraged their marriage but with the clear stipulation that Green would not inherit Hetty's money. Specifically, the will stated that it was to be "free from the debts, control or interference of any such husband." With Hetty's inheritance safe, her father encouraged the marriage, as he was concerned with his declining health and about Hetty's ability to manage the family business in his absence.

In May 1865, Hetty and Edward announced their engagement, but soon thereafter, both Hetty's father and Aunt Sylvia died. Although Hetty was the primary beneficiary on both estates, most of the assets were placed into trust, entitling Hetty only to the income. Robinson's estate was estimated to be $6 million, but all but $1 million was placed in a trust that entitled Hetty only to the income. Sylvia Howland had willed half of her $2 million estate to charities and entities in the town of New Bedford; the rest was placed in a trust for Hetty, but once again without her control of the principal. This enraged Hetty because she believed that she could invest the assets more effectively and at a much lower cost – a claim she later proved beyond any shadow of a doubt.

Green was especially angered by Sylvia's will, and she initiated a drawn-out court case disputing its legitimacy. The executor of Howland's will, Thomas Mandell, rejected Hetty's claim that an addendum to the will granted almost the entire estate to her. Mandell claimed that the addendum was a forgery, and it was challenged in court. The case, Robinson v. Mandell, remains notable as an early example of the forensic use of mathematics. The case was ultimately decided against Robinson after the court ruled that the addendum and signature were forgeries. Hetty settled the case for a smaller percentage of the estate (approximately $600,000), which was placed in trust.

Exhausted from lawsuits and concerned about an effort by Hetty's cousins to have her indicted for forgery based on the Robinson v. Mandell decision, the couple moved overseas to London, where they lived in the Langham Hotel. The Greens departed the U.S. for London soon after their wedding on July 11, 1867. Their two children, Edward Howland Robinson Green (called Ned) and Harriet Sylvia Ann Howland Green Wilks (called Sylvia), were born in London: Ned on August 23, 1868, and Sylvia on January 7, 1871.

== Investing career ==
Green followed a contrarian investing strategy, in her words, "I buy when things are low and nobody wants them. I keep them until they go up and people are crazy to get them. That is, I believe, the secret of all successful business." Green invested the interest from her father's trust fund, once again investing as her father had done, in Civil War bonds, which paid a high yield in gold, augmented by railroad stocks. Her annual profits during her first year in London amounted to $1.25 million, and the most she ever earned in a day was $200,000. Green went on to say, "I believe in getting in at the bottom and out on top. I like to buy railroad stocks or mortgage bonds. When I see a good thing going cheap because nobody wants it, I buy a lot of it and tuck it away." Her investment strategy could perhaps be best described as a "buy low, sell high" position. Hetty's discounted greenbacks, bought during the Civil War, were increased in value when Congress passed legislation in 1875 backing them with gold. As Hetty said of her investing philosophy, "Before deciding on an investment, I seek out every kind of information about it."

When the Green family returned to the United States in October 1873, after Edward suffered losses on Wall Street, they settled in Edward's hometown of Bellows Falls, Vermont. Hetty quarreled with Edward's mother until she died in 1875. That same year, Hetty covered Edward's losses associated with the London and San Francisco Bank, of which he was one of the directors. Hetty bailed Edward out once again in 1884.

After the 1885 collapse of the financial house John J. Cisco & Son, of which Edward was a partner, it was disclosed Edward had $700,000 in debt. Hetty Green's $500,000 represented one-quarter of the bank's assets. The bank refused to allow her to transfer her $26 million in stocks, bonds, mortgages, and deeds to the Chemical National Bank until Edward's debt was paid. In the end, Hetty made the transfer and paid off her husband's debt, but never forgave Edward.

Green set up an office in the Chemical Bank but continued to live in boarding houses, flats, or hotels. By then she was known as the "Queen of Wall Street." Her investing philosophy, in her words, included, "In business generally, don't close a bargain until you have reflected on it overnight." She also thought, "It is the duty of every woman, I believe, to learn to take care of her own business affairs," and "A girl should be brought up as to be able to make her own living..." "Whether rich or poor, a young woman should know how a bank account works, understand the composition of mortgages and bonds, and know the value of interest and how it accumulates."

The Panic of 1907 provided an opportunity for Green to showcase many of the investment skills that she had accumulated over several decades. Unlike most Wall Street financiers, Green predicted the panic long before its arrival. She explained her foresight, stating, "I saw this situation developing three years ago, and I am on record as predicting it. I said the rich were approaching the brink, and that a ‘panic’ was inevitable." For several years before the panic, Green amassed a large cash position. When the panic arrived in October 1907, Green lent liberally to financiers and the City of New York to get them through the crisis. She was also the only woman invited to the critical meeting with J. Pierpont Morgan and the leading banking executives at the height of the crisis.

=== Investment strategy ===
Green conducted much of her business at the offices of the Seaboard National Bank in New York, surrounded by trunks and suitcases full of her papers; she did not want to pay rent for her own office. Possibly because of her usually dour dress (due mainly to frugality, but perhaps in part related to her Quaker upbringing), she was given the nickname "the Witch of Wall Street".

Green was a successful businesswoman who dealt mainly in real estate, invested in railroads and mines and lent money while acquiring numerous mortgages. The City of New York came to Green for loans to keep the city afloat on several occasions, most particularly during the Panic of 1907; she wrote a check for $1.1 million and took her payment in short-term revenue bonds. Keenly detail-oriented, she would travel thousands of miles alone—in an era when few women would dare travel unescorted—to collect a debt of a few hundred dollars.

Ken Fisher discusses Green in his 2007 book 100 Minds That Made the Market. Fisher argues that despite her eccentricities, Green was in many ways a better investor than most of her early Wall Street contemporaries. Green clearly understood the power of compound interest, and her focus on regular modest gains of 6% a year and frugal living made her fortune more durable than the likes of Jesse Livermore who repeatedly earned larger sums on more extravagant deals but also went bankrupt through excessive spending and high-risk investments.

== Reputation ==
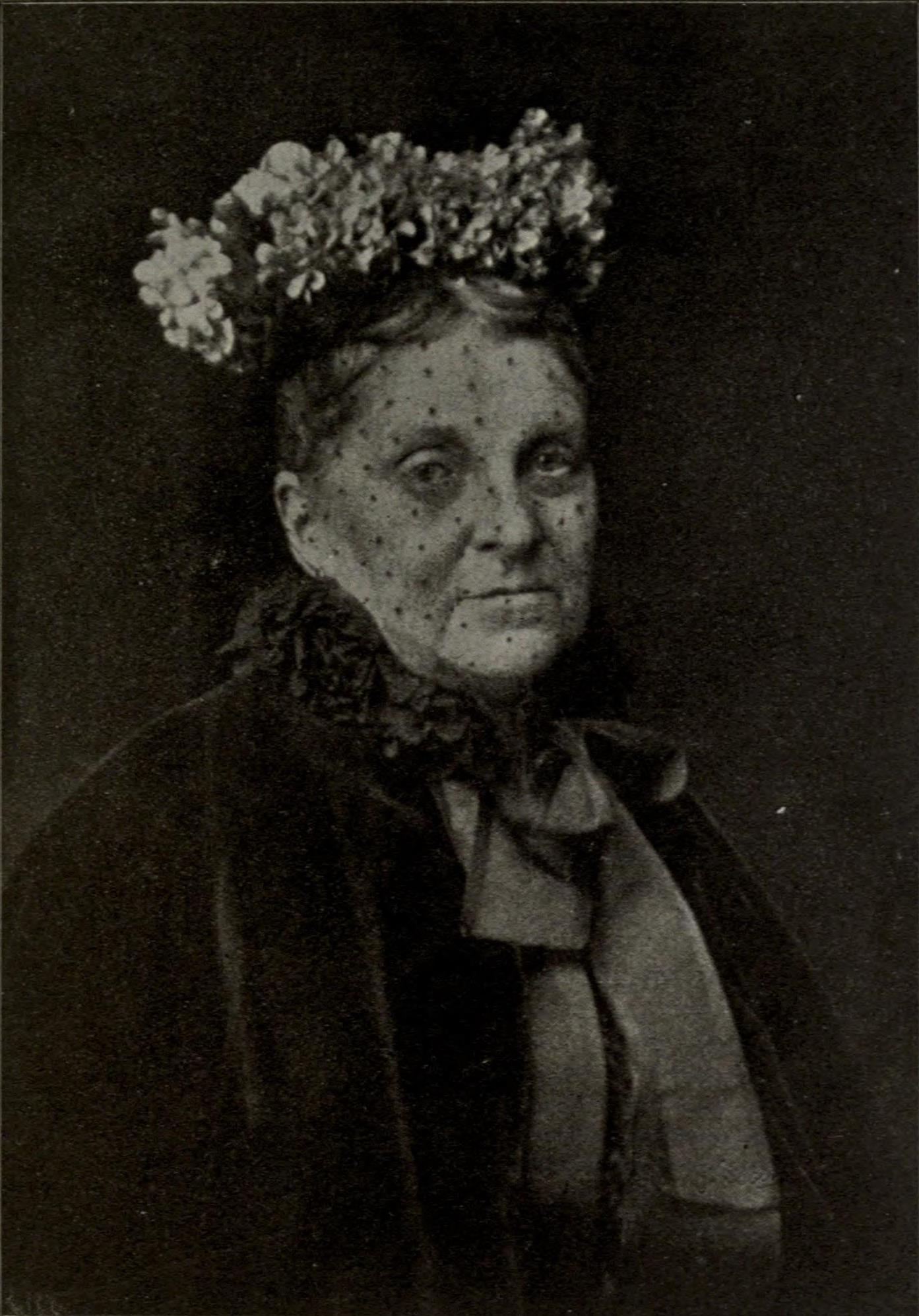
Green circa 1905

=== Thrift ===
The Gilded Age was an era known for its excesses in spending on material goods, and she was among the few prominent investors who chose not to partake. Indeed, she was known for being frugal or stingy with her money. Journalists of her time often presented her thriftiness as evidence of her miserliness, when in fact it played an important role in her investing strategy. Examples of negative media portrayals included reports that she never turned on the heat or used hot water. She was also known for wearing a single black dress that she would not replace until it was thoroughly worn out. Moreover, she reportedly instructed her laundress to wash only the dirtiest parts of her dresses (the hems) to save money on soap. The harshest accusation, however, was that she neglected treating her son's injured leg, which eventually resulted in an amputation. The evidence cited was her refusal to pay for a visit to a single physician. However, there is substantial evidence that Green put great expense and effort to treat her son. This included visits to multiple specialists, as well as temporarily relocating her residence so that she could care for him.

Green's personal perspective on thrift differed markedly from that of the public. There is evidence that her frugality was passed down from her father, who was also a successful investor. She once explained her thrift by recounting an explanation her father gave after he rejected an expensive cigar that was offered to him, “I smoke four cent cigars and I like them. If I were to smoke better ones, I might lose my taste for the cheap ones that I now find quite satisfactory.”

Green's thrift also reflected her Quaker upbringing, which featured an emphasis on plain clothing among other characteristics. When a reporter questioned why she had spent so little time during a visit to an expensive hotel, she responded "Young man, I am a Quaker, and I am trying to live up to the tenets of that faith. That is why I dress plainly and live quietly. No other kind of life would please me." Finally, Green’s thrift was essential to her investment strategy, as it enabled her to buy assets confidently amid financial panics because it prepared her to live on minimal expenses.

=== Media portrayal ===
Green was often portrayed negatively in the media. Yet her investment strategy shunned the nefarious tactics that were commonly used by Wall Street speculators such as Daniel Drew, Jay Gould, and Jim Fisk. She once commented on this misperception:

It has turned out...that my life is written for me down in Wall Street by people who, I assume, do not care to know one iota of the real Hetty Green. I am in earnest; therefore they picture [me] as heartless. I go my own way, take no partners, risk nobody else's fortune, therefore I am Madame Ishmael, set against every man.

She was a secret philanthropist, avoiding the attention of the press, stating, "I believe in discreet charity." Green also had the reputation of being an effective nurse, caring for her children and old neighbors. Her favorite poem was William Henry Channing's "My Symphony", which starts with "To live content with small means..."

Despite the strength of her ethics relative to her peers, Green entered the lexicon of turn-of-the-century America with the popular phrase "I'm not Hetty if I do look green." O. Henry used this phrase in his 1890s story "The Skylight Room", in which a young woman, negotiating the rent on a room in a rooming house owned by an imperious old lady, wishes to make it clear she is neither as rich as she appears nor as naive.

== Later life ==
As a young man, Ned Green moved away from his mother to manage the family's properties in Chicago and, later, Texas. In middle age, he returned to New York; his mother lived her final months with him.

Green's daughter Sylvia lived with her mother until her thirties. Green disapproved of all of her daughter's suitors, suspecting that they were after her fortune. Sylvia finally married Matthew Astor Wilks on February 23, 1909, after a two-year courtship. A minor heir to the Astor fortune, Wilks entered the marriage with $2 million of his own, enough to assure Green that he was not a gold digger. Nonetheless, she compelled him to sign a prenuptial agreement waiving his right to inherit Sylvia's fortune.

When her grown children left home, Green moved repeatedly among small apartments in Brooklyn Heights and after 1898, in Hoboken, New Jersey, mainly to avoid New York's property tax, though she did loan money to the city at reasonable rates. She then regularly commuted to her office in the Chemical Bank on Broadway. By 1905, Green was New York's largest lender. Unsubstantiated rumors claimed that she ate only oatmeal, eggs, and onions, unheated so as not to increase her fuel bill.

In her old age, Green developed a hernia, but refused to have an operation, preferring to use a stick to press down the swelling. She eventually moved her office to the National Park Bank, when she thought she had been poisoned at the Chemical Bank, a fear she had most of her life.

== Death and legacy ==
On July 3, 1916, Green died at age 81 at her son's New York City home. According to her longstanding "World's Greatest Miser" entry in the Guinness Book of World Records, she died of apoplexy after arguing with a maid over the virtues of skimmed milk. The New York Times reported she suffered a series of strokes leading up to her death.

Upon her death, Green was known as the "Wizard of Finance" and the "Richest Woman in America." Estimates of her net worth ranged from $100 million to $200 million (equivalent to $2.7 billion to $5.4 billion in 2024), making her arguably the richest woman in the world at the time.

Two days after her death, The New York Times paid tribute to Green:

It was that Mrs. Green was a woman that made her career the subject of endless curiosity, comment, and astonishment...Her habits were the legacy of New England ancestors who had the best of reasons for knowing "the value of money," for never wasting it, and for risking it only when their shrewd minds saw an approach to certainty of profit. Though something of hardness was ascribed to her, that she harmed any is not recorded, and victims of ruthlessness are usually audible...That there are few like her is not a cause of regret; that there are many less commendable, is one.

Green was buried at the Immanuel Cemetery at the Immanuel Episcopal Church in Bellows Falls, Vermont, next to her husband. She had converted late in life to his Episcopalian faith so that she could be interred with him. Their two children split her estate, which included a ten-year trust for Sylvia administered by Ned. Sylvia died in 1951, leaving an estimated $200 million and donating all but $1,388,000 to 64 colleges, churches, hospitals, and other charities. Both children were buried near their parents in Bellows Falls.

Green's former mansion in Englewood, New Jersey was purchased by the Actors Fund in 1928. The mansion was razed in 1959, and a modern facility was erected in 1961, which currently houses the Lillian Booth Actors Home.

== In popular culture ==
Green is mentioned in George M. Cohan's song "Then I'd Be Satisfied With Life". She is also mentioned in The Decemberists's "Calamity Song."

The She-Wolf (1931) and You Can't Buy Everything (1934) are films about miserly billionaire businesswomen based on Green and played by Australian-born actress May Robson.

In the King of the Hill episode (S8S8, 2004) "Rich Hank, Poor Hank", Connie mentions Green by saying that extremely wealthy people who are also cheap, often have a mental illness.

The March 20, 2016 episode of The Dollop podcast featured Green.

== See also ==
- Business magnate
- Collyer brothers, New York City misers and hoarders
- Countess Annie Leary
