= Science Advisor to the President =

Cabinet-level advisor to the president of United States

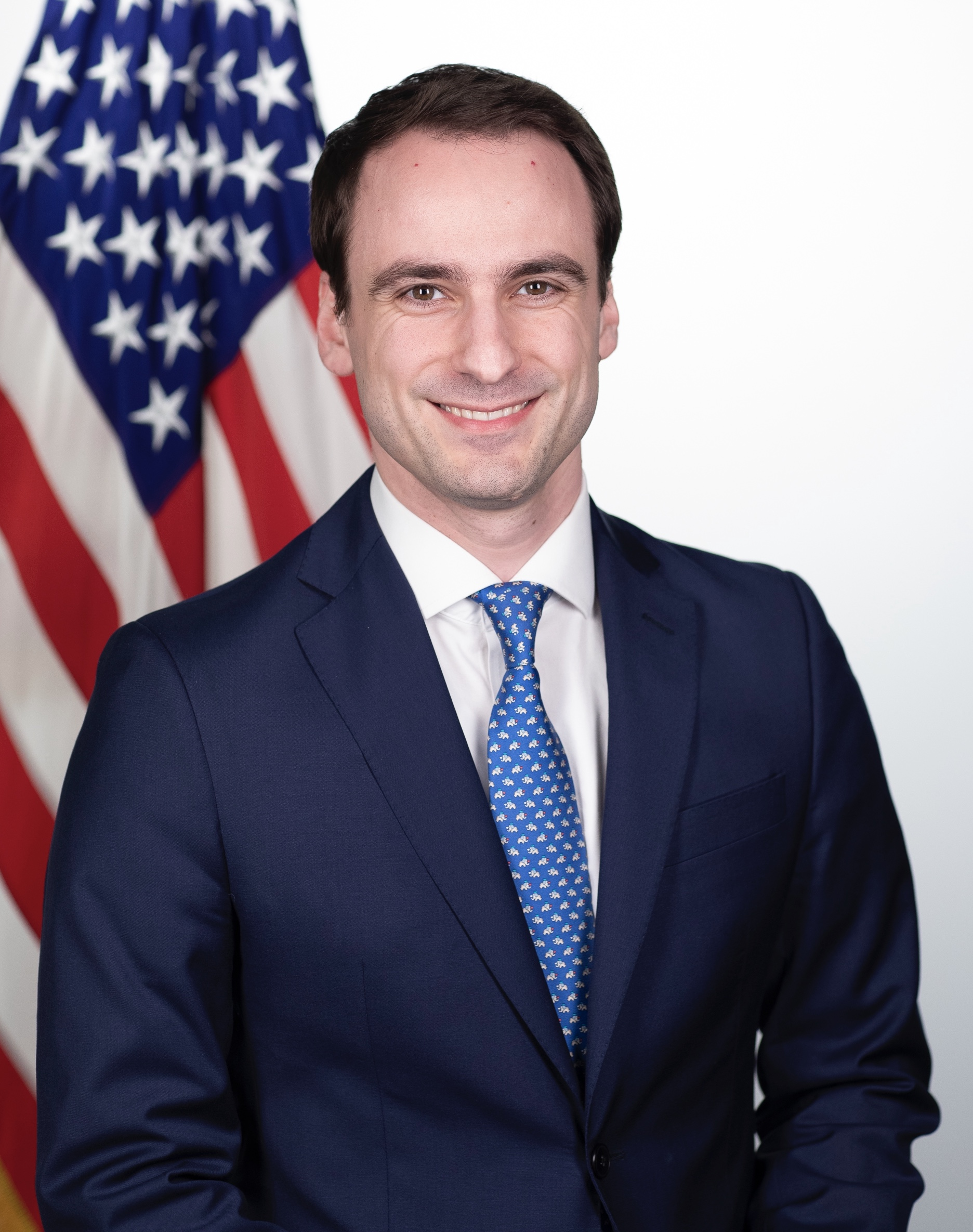
- Incumbent; Michael Kratsios since January 20, 2025
- Office of Science and Technology Policy
- Reports to: President of the United States
- Appointer: The president with advice and consent by the Senate
- Term length: No fixed term
- Precursor: Chair of the Science Advisory Board
- Formation: June 28, 1941
- First holder: Vannevar Bush
- Officially: Director of the Office of Science and Technology Policy. Historically: Director of the Office of Science and Technology, Chairman of the President's Science Advisory Committee, Director of the Office of Scientific Research and Development

The science advisor to the president is an individual charged with providing advisory opinions and analysis on science and technology matters to the president of the United States. The first science advisor, Vannevar Bush, chairman of the Office of Scientific Research and Development, served presidents Franklin Delano Roosevelt and Harry S. Truman from 1941 to 1951. President Truman created the President's Science Advisory Committee in 1951, establishing the chairman of this committee as the president's science advisor. This committee continued under presidents Dwight D. Eisenhower, John F. Kennedy, Lyndon B. Johnson, and Richard M. Nixon until 1973. Nixon terminated the committee rather than appointing a replacement for his advisor who had resigned. The US Congress established the Office of Science and Technology Policy in 1976, re-establishing presidential science advisors to the present day.

The current advisor is Michael Kratsios, who is serving as the 13th director of the White House Office of Science and Technology Policy (OSTP) since 2025.

== History ==
=== Special Advisory Board ===
Although the National Research Council (now known as the National Academies of Sciences, Engineering, and Medicine), formed in 1916, was the first body formed to advise the government on science and technology, President Franklin Delano Roosevelt launched the Science Advisory Board as a body within the NRC in 1933 in order to advise the president. Karl Taylor Compton served as the chair of the body. However, the body was dissolved in 1935.

=== World War II ===
The OSTP evolved out of the Office of Scientific Research and Development created in 1941 during World War II by Roosevelt. Vannevar Bush chaired this office through Roosevelt's death in 1945, and continued under Roosevelt's successor Harry S. Truman until 1951.

=== PSAC ===
After the war, President Harry S. Truman replaced the OSRD with the Science Advisory Committee in 1951. The office was moved to the White House on November 21, 1957, by President Dwight D. Eisenhower to provide advice and recommendation in response to the Space Race started by the USSR's launch of the first artificial Earth satellite, Sputnik 1.

=== OSTP ===
President Richard M. Nixon eliminated the PSAC in 1973, rather than appointing a replacement for his second science advisor, Edward E. David Jr., who resigned. The United States Congress established the OSTP in 1976 with a broad mandate to advise the president and others within the Executive Office of the President on the effects of science and technology on domestic and international affairs. The 1976 act also authorizes OSTP to lead inter-agency efforts to develop and to implement sound science and technology policies and budgets and to work with the private sector, state and local governments, the science and higher education communities, and other nations toward this end.

== Science advisors ==
Denotes acting capacity.

| Image | Name | Agency | Start | End | President |
|---|---|---|---|---|---|
| | Vannevar Bush | OSRD | June 28, 1941 | December 31, 1947 | Franklin D. Roosevelt (1933–1945) |
| | Vannevar Bush | OSRD | June 28, 1941 | December 31, 1947 | Harry S. Truman (1945–1953) |
| | Oliver Buckley | PSAC | April 20, 1951 | June 15, 1952 | Harry S. Truman (1945–1953) |
| | Lee DuBridge | PSAC | 1952 | 1956 | Harry S. Truman (1945–1953) |
| | Lee DuBridge | PSAC | 1952 | 1956 | Dwight D. Eisenhower (1953–1961) |
| | Isidor Rabi | PSAC | 1956 | 1957 | Dwight D. Eisenhower (1953–1961) |
| | James Killian | PSAC | November 7, 1957 | July 1959 | Dwight D. Eisenhower (1953–1961) |
| | George Kistiakowsky | PSAC | July 1959 | January 20, 1961 | Dwight D. Eisenhower (1953–1961) |
| | Jerome Wiesner | OST | January 20, 1961 | January 24, 1964 | John F. Kennedy (1961–1963) |
| | Jerome Wiesner | OST | January 20, 1961 | January 24, 1964 | Lyndon B. Johnson (1963–1969) |
| | Donald Hornig | OST | January 24, 1964 | January 20, 1969 | Lyndon B. Johnson (1963–1969) |
| | Lee DuBridge | OST | January 20, 1969 | August 31, 1970 | Richard Nixon (1969–1974) |
| | Ed David | OST | August 31, 1970 | January 26, 1973 | Richard Nixon (1969–1974) |
| | Guyford Stever | OSTP | August 9, 1976 | January 20, 1977 | Gerald Ford (1974–1977) |
| | Frank Press | OSTP | January 20, 1977 | January 20, 1981 | Jimmy Carter |
| | Benjamin Huberman; Acting | OSTP | March 5, 1981 | August 1981 | Ronald Reagan (1981–1989) |
| | Jay Keyworth | OSTP | August 1981 | December 1985 | Ronald Reagan (1981–1989) |
| | John McTague; Acting | OSTP | January 1986 | May 23, 1986 | Ronald Reagan (1981–1989) |
| | Richard Johnson; Acting | OSTP | May 24, 1986 | October 1, 1986 | Ronald Reagan (1981–1989) |
| | William Graham | OSTP | October 2, 1986 | June 1989 | Ronald Reagan (1981–1989) |
| | Thomas Rona; Acting | OSTP | June 1989 | August 1989 | George H. W. Bush (1989–1993) |
| | William Wells; Acting | OSTP | August 1989 | August 1989 | George H. W. Bush (1989–1993) |
| | Allan Bromley | OSTP | August 1989 | January 20, 1993 | George H. W. Bush (1989–1993) |
| | Jack Gibbons | OSTP | January 20, 1993 | April 3, 1998 | Bill Clinton (1993–2001) |
| | Kerri-Ann Jones; Acting | OSTP | April 4, 1998 | August 3, 1998 | Bill Clinton (1993–2001) |
| | Neal Lane | OSTP | August 4, 1998 | January 20, 2001 | Bill Clinton (1993–2001) |
| | Rosina Bierbaum; Acting | OSTP | January 21, 2001 | September 30, 2001 | George W. Bush (2001–2009) |
| | Clifford Gabriel; Acting | OSTP | October 1, 2001 | October 28, 2001 | George W. Bush (2001–2009) |
| | Jack Marburger | OSTP | October 29, 2001 | January 20, 2009 | George W. Bush (2001–2009) |
| | Ted Wackler; Acting | OSTP | January 20, 2009 | March 19, 2009 | Barack Obama (2009–2017) |
| | John Holdren | OSTP | March 19, 2009 | January 20, 2017 | Barack Obama (2009–2017) |
| | Ted Wackler; Acting | OSTP | January 20, 2017 | January 11, 2019 | Donald Trump (2017–2021) |
| | Kelvin Droegemeier | OSTP | January 11, 2019 | January 15, 2021 | Donald Trump (2017–2021) |
| | Kei Koizumi; Acting | OSTP | January 20, 2021 | January 25, 2021 | Joe Biden (2021–2025) |
| | Eric Lander | OSTP | January 25, 2021 | February 18, 2022 | Joe Biden (2021–2025) |
| | Francis Collins; Acting | OSTP | February 18, 2022 | October 3, 2022 | Joe Biden (2021–2025) |
| | Arati Prabhakar | OSTP | October 3, 2022 | January 20, 2025 | Joe Biden (2021–2025) |
| | Michael Kratsios | OSTP | January 20, 2025 | present | Donald Trump (2025–present) |

== See also ==
- Chief Technology Officer of the United States
