= Lee A. DuBridge =

American physicist and academic administrator (1901–1994)

Lee DuBridge
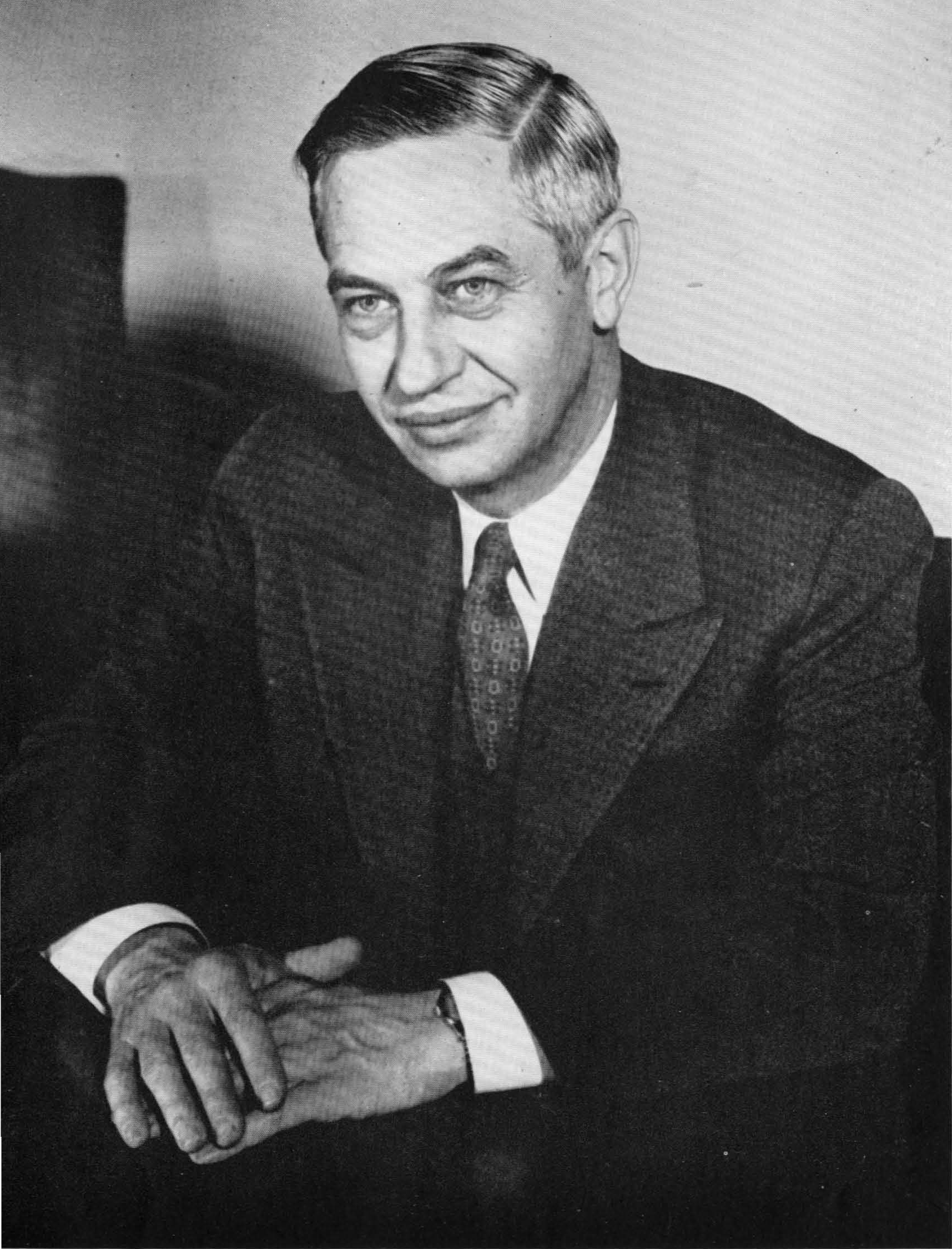
- DuBridge in 1950

Director of the Office of Science and Technology
- In office January 20, 1969 – August 31, 1970
- President: Richard Nixon
- Preceded by: Donald Hornig
- Succeeded by: Ed David

Chairman of the President's Science Advisory Committee
- In office 1952–1956
- President: Harry S. Truman; Dwight D. Eisenhower
- Preceded by: Oliver Buckley
- Succeeded by: Isidor Rabi

2nd President of the California Institute of Technology
- In office 1946–1969
- Preceded by: Robert Millikan
- Succeeded by: Harold Brown

Personal details
- Born: September 21, 1901 Terre Haute, Indiana, U.S.
- Died: January 23, 1994 (aged 92) Duarte, California, U.S.
- Education: Cornell College (BA); University of Wisconsin, Madison (MA, PhD)
- Awards: Vannevar Bush Award (1982)
- Scientific career
- Fields: Physics
- Workplaces: University of Rochester; MIT Radiation Laboratory; California Institute of Technology; Washington University
- Thesis: Variations in the photo-electric sensitivity of platinum (1926)
- Doctoral advisor: Charles Mendenhall
- Doctoral students: LeRoy Apker; Robert H. Dicke; Albert G. Hill

Lee Alvin DuBridge (September 21, 1901 – January 23, 1994) was an American physicist and academic administrator. He led the MIT Radiation Laboratory, served as president of Caltech, and advised three U.S. presidents on science policy.

DuBridge's early research on the photoelectric effect produced the standard text on the subject, and at the University of Rochester he built one of the most powerful cyclotrons in the United States. In 1940, Ernest Lawrence and Alfred Loomis recruited him to direct the newly established MIT Radiation Laboratory, which under his leadership grew from a few dozen physicists to a staff of approximately 4,000 and developed over 100 types of microwave radar for the Allied war effort. DuBridge's management of the Rad Lab established a model for subsequent "big science" partnerships between civilian science and the military.

After the war DuBridge served as president of the California Institute of Technology for twenty-three years, overseeing a period of rapid growth in which the campus, endowment, and faculty roughly tripled in size. He held senior science advisory positions under presidents Truman, Eisenhower, and Nixon, and was a prominent defender of academic freedom during the McCarthy era.

Time featured him on its cover in 1955, calling him "the senior statesman of science." Harold Brown and John D. Roberts, in their memoir for the American Philosophical Society, described him as "one of the most influential American scientists of the 20th century."

== Background ==
DuBridge was born on September 21, 1901, in Terre Haute, Indiana. His father held a series of jobs as a YMCA secretary, football coach, and physical education director, and the family moved frequently across Iowa, California, Montana, and Michigan. His mother was a poet and writer who during the Depression wrote verse for greeting cards. The DuBridge family lived in Sault Ste. Marie, Michigan from 1912 to 1920, when Lee was of middle school and high school age. He graduated from Sault Ste. Marie High School in 1918. The information about him in his high school yearbook that year included the statement "Wants to be a scientist".

DuBridge enrolled at Cornell College in Mount Vernon, Iowa, in 1918, supporting himself with a scholarship and the thirty dollars a month he earned as a waiter in a women's dormitory. He had intended to study economics, but when a favored professor left and was replaced by one he disliked, he turned to physics instead. There he was drawn deeper into the subject by his professor O. H. Smith, later a recipient of the Oersted Medal for physics teaching. He graduated Phi Beta Kappa in 1922.

DuBridge then entered the University of Wisconsin–Madison, where his first assignment was Arnold Sommerfeld's Atombau und Spektrallinien, read in the original German under Charles Mendenhall. He received his M.A. in 1924 and his Ph.D. in 1926 with a dissertation on the photoelectric effect in platinum. During his graduate years he also worked a summer at Bell Telephone Laboratories with the future Nobel laureate Clinton Davisson.

== Research career ==
=== Photoelectric research ===
After completing his doctorate DuBridge held a National Research Council fellowship at Caltech from 1926 to 1928, working under Robert Millikan on the relationship between thermionic and photoelectric emission.

He then joined Washington University in St. Louis as an assistant professor, where he collaborated with Arthur Hughes on Photoelectric Phenomena (McGraw-Hill, 1932), which became a standard reference in the field for many years. A second volume, New Theories of the Photoelectric Effect, followed in 1935. DuBridge spent fifteen years studying photoelectric processes, building all the apparatus required for experiments of increasing precision.

In 1931 he also described in Physical Review an amplifier for very small currents with applications to measurements of radioactivity; this apparatus, known as the Brown-DuBridge amplifier, was later placed on exhibit in the National Museum of History and Technology.

=== University of Rochester ===
In 1934, at age thirty-three, DuBridge was appointed full professor and chairman of the physics department at the University of Rochester, which had recently been endowed by George Eastman. He brought in Fred Seitz and Milton Plesset and helped rescue Victor Weisskopf from Hitler's Europe, making Weisskopf among the department's first Jewish faculty.

DuBridge shifted the department's focus toward nuclear physics, leading construction of the third, and at the time most powerful, cyclotron in the United States. The team built an 18-inch machine with advice from Ernest Lawrence and Cooksey at Berkeley, borrowing metal for magnets, obtaining electrical equipment without charge, and raising $4,000 from local donors for cash expenses. By 1936 it reached 5 MeV and eventually nearly 8 MeV. In 1938, DuBridge was additionally appointed dean of the Faculty of Arts and Sciences.

== Radiation Laboratory (MIT) ==
In the fall of 1940, as the National Defense Research Committee organized the American response to the European war, Ernest Lawrence and financier Alfred Loomis sought a director for a new microwave radar laboratory to be established at MIT. Lawrence, who had declined the position himself, identified DuBridge on the basis of his demonstrated scientific and administrative abilities. On October 15, Lawrence telephoned DuBridge from Loomis's apartment in New York. "I can't tell you about it, but I assure you it's very important," he said. DuBridge took the train that evening and the next day, at a meeting at the Hotel Commodore with Lawrence and Loomis, accepted the post of technical director, a title soon changed to director.

DuBridge and Lawrence immediately began recruiting physicists. They visited Louis A. Turner at Princeton, and DuBridge attended a seminar at Indiana University to sound out researchers including Isidor Rabi and F. Wheeler Loomis. A conference on applied nuclear physics at MIT in late October 1940, attended by some 600 physicists, provided a broader recruiting opportunity. At luncheon meetings at the Algonquin Club in Boston, hosted by Loomis and Karl Compton, select invitees signed secrecy agreements and received a briefing on the new laboratory's mission. By mid-December 1940 the Laboratory consisted of about 30 physicists, three guards, two stockroom men, and one secretary.

=== Leadership and organization ===
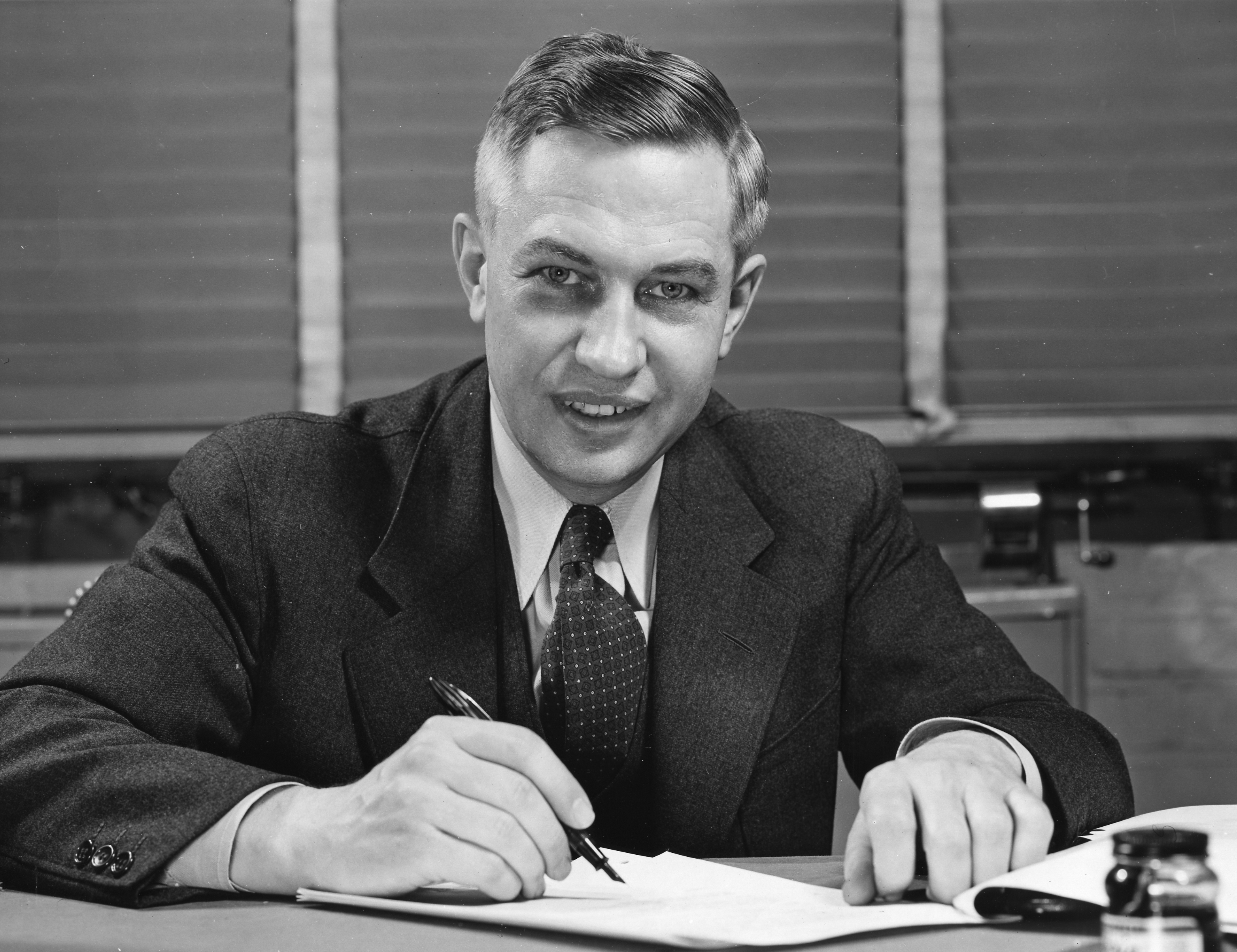
Dubridge in his MIT campus office, 1945

The Radiation Laboratory grew rapidly under DuBridge's direction. By early 1942 it had roughly 500 employees but needed, by DuBridge's estimate, to expand sixfold to fulfill its expanding mission of research, engineering development, small-scale production, field installation, and training. To manage this growth DuBridge devised a reorganization in March 1942 that synthesized competing proposals for purely "vertical" (systems-based) and "horizontal" (component-based) structures. The resulting divisional organization grouped related component and research work into divisions while keeping systems groups under single divisional heads. The number of divisions and the scope of their activities were determined not by abstract principles but by the available leadership talent. DuBridge and the Steering Committee identified the "top people" and built the structure around them.

The Laboratory operated with what its official historian Henry Guerlac called "militantly defended autonomy" from both the NDRC and MIT. Guerlac wrote that it "came close to realizing a scientist's dream of a scientific republic, whose only limitation was the supply of scientists." At its peak the Laboratory employed approximately 4,000 scientists and engineers, with an annual budget of $50 million, and developed over 100 types of microwave radar. Its products included the SCR-584 gun-laying radar, airborne bombing radars such as H_{2}X, the LORAN navigation system, and the MEW early-warning set. DuBridge managed an unprecedented partnership between civilian scientists and the armed services, coordinating research with industrial production across hundreds of subcontractors and dispatching field teams to combat theaters around the world.

DuBridge's leadership style was characterized by contemporaries as understated and cooperative. He later summarized his own contribution as "largely administrative" and claimed not to have understood the complex electronic circuitry involved, though his colleagues credited his enthusiasm, clarity, and personal influence. Harold Brown and Roberts called the Radiation Laboratory "the first laboratory that could be described as 'big science' by present-day standards," and DuBridge's management of it established a model for subsequent large-scale partnerships between civilian science and the military.

=== Overseas operations and wartime travel ===
DuBridge's role extended well beyond Cambridge. He commuted to Washington almost weekly to coordinate with the military services and the NDRC. He was instrumental in establishing a regular transatlantic exchange of radar expertise with Britain, building on the foundations laid by the Tizard Mission. The Laboratory operated overseas branches that grew substantially as the war progressed: the British Branch of the Radiation Laboratory, headquartered near the Telecommunications Research Establishment at Great Malvern, expanded to roughly 100 workers after D-Day; an Advanced Service Base opened in Paris in September 1944; and a small Australian branch provided microwave expertise to General Douglas MacArthur's forces in the Pacific.

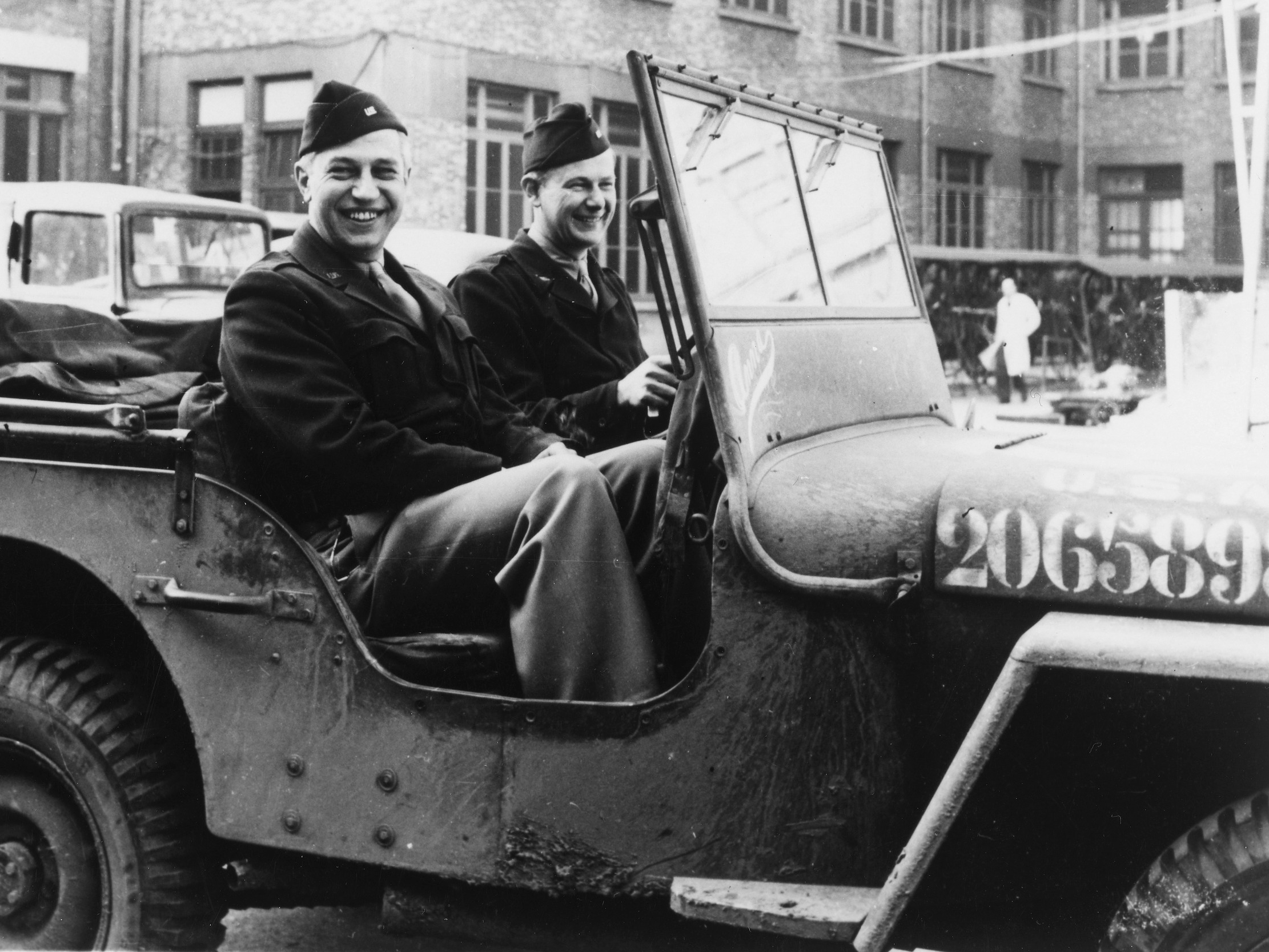
Lee DuBridge and John Trump in Paris, April 1945

DuBridge himself flew to Europe in 1943, 1944, and 1945. In early 1945, a few months before Germany's surrender, he toured the continent behind the advancing Allied lines. Flying into the Reich on military transports, he passed over cities that the Laboratory's radars had helped to flatten, and visited the recently liberated Buchenwald concentration camp. On this trip he laid plans for closing the Paris and British Branch operations while the war against Japan continued. He also visited Los Alamos, where he had close friends among the physicists he had released from the Radiation Laboratory as its mission wound down, and saw the first nuclear weapons.

=== Demobilization ===
After the surrender of Japan, DuBridge addressed the assembled staff in August 1945. "Few, if any of us, will ever again have the experience of working in such an exciting, fast-moving undertaking," he told them. He singled out his deputy F. Wheeler Loomis for running day-to-day operations, and concluded by noting the responsibilities of the atomic era: "We must see that in coming generations science serves to better the condition of mankind and not lead to its destruction." The Laboratory closed in an orderly fashion, with its responsibilities transferred to industry, and its staff of 4,000 dispersed to universities and companies. The Rad Lab eventually counted among its alumni and consultants ten Nobel laureates, nearly as many university presidents, and three presidential science advisers.

== Caltech ==
DuBridge briefly returned to Rochester after the war but found that the passage of time had put him behind in nuclear physics research. Within six months his old acquaintance Max Mason, a Caltech trustee, telephoned to offer him the presidency of the California Institute of Technology. DuBridge accepted and took office in 1946, succeeding Millikan, who had been his mentor two decades earlier. Millikan's official title had been chairman of the executive council; DuBridge became Caltech's first to hold the title of president.

DuBridge led Caltech through a period of postwar expansion sustained by heavy federal support for science. During his twenty-three-year tenure the campus grew from 30 acres to 90, the endowment from $17 million to over $140 million, the faculty from 260 to 550, and the number of buildings from 20 to more than 60. He oversaw the dedication of the 200-inch Hale Telescope on Palomar Mountain and the conversion of the Jet Propulsion Laboratory from a military rocketry center into the premier facility for unmanned space exploration. He recruited Robert Bacher, his former Radiation Laboratory colleague, as chairman of physics, mathematics, and astronomy; Bacher later became provost. Under DuBridge's presidency Caltech attracted Richard Feynman, Murray Gell-Mann, and Rudolf Mössbauer in theoretical physics, Max Delbrück and Roger Sperry in biology, and maintained its strength in chemistry under Linus Pauling and in low-energy nuclear physics under William Fowler and C. C. Lauritsen.

=== Academic freedom ===
DuBridge was a vocal defender of academic freedom during the McCarthy era. When several Caltech trustees joined calls to fire Linus Pauling, who had been denied a passport over allegations of Communist Party membership, DuBridge and Bacher stood their ground. DuBridge offered to resign rather than exert pressure on Pauling; the trustees instead resigned. In 1954 he testified in Washington on behalf of J. Robert Oppenheimer during the security hearing that resulted in the revocation of Oppenheimer's clearance. DuBridge later called it "a rigged hearing" and said he "regarded the charges against him as trivial, if not false."

== Science advisory roles ==
DuBridge's involvement in science policy extended across three decades and three presidential administrations. He served on the Scientific Advisory Board of the U.S. Air Force (1945–1949) and the Naval Research Advisory Committee (1945–1951) before President Truman appointed him in 1951 to the newly created President's Science Advisory Committee. President Eisenhower made him chairman the following year, a post he held until 1958.

DuBridge had planned to retire from Caltech at sixty-five but remained for a final fundraising campaign. In November 1968 he flew to New York to meet President-elect Richard Nixon at the Hotel Pierre and agreed to serve as presidential science advisor. Roberts and Brown wrote that the Nixon White House, run by H. R. Haldeman and John Ehrlichman, "could not, or would not, use DuBridge effectively," and that he lacked the access to the president that some predecessors had enjoyed. He resigned after eighteen months. DuBridge later told friends he found the Nixon administration lacking in interest in science and technology because of their "only slight political importance." In reluctantly accepting the resignation, Nixon praised DuBridge for his "skill, wisdom, and seasoned judgment." Nixon subsequently abolished the science adviser post; it was not revived until President Ford appointed Guy Stever to serve concurrently as director of the National Science Foundation.

== Personal life ==
As an undergraduate at Cornell College, DuBridge met Doris May Koht; they married on September 1, 1925. They had two children, Barbara Lee (born 1931) and Richard Alvin (born 1933). Doris died of spinal cancer in November 1973, after forty-eight years of marriage.

In 1974 DuBridge married Arrola Bush Cole, the widow of Russell D. Cole, who had served as president of Cornell College for many years. During his undergraduate years DuBridge had once asked Arrola out, but she had refused, saying they had not been properly introduced; the two families had remained in periodic contact over the decades. They honeymooned aboard the Queen Elizabeth 2 on its first round-the-world cruise.

DuBridge died of pneumonia on January 23, 1994, at a retirement home in Duarte, California. He was 92. Arrola died on September 30, 1994, in Hingham, Massachusetts.

== Awards and recognition ==
=== Associations ===
DuBridge served on boards for: RAND Corporation (1948–1961), National Science Board (1950–1954), Western College Association (president, 1950–1951), Carnegie Endowment for International Peace (1951–1957), Air Pollution Foundation (1953–1961), Institute for Defense Analysis (1956–1960), Rockefeller Foundation (1956–1976), National Science Board (vice chair, 1958–1964), board of governors for the Los Angeles Town Hall (1959–1963), Edison Foundation (1960–1968), KCET (1962–1968), Huntington Library (1962–1968), and National Educational Television (1964–1968).

=== Awards ===
- 1940: Sc.D. (honorary), Cornell College
- 1942: Elected to the American Philosophical Society
- 1943: Elected to the National Academy of Sciences
- 1946: King's Medal for Service in the Cause of Freedom
- 1946: American Academy of Arts and Sciences
- 1947: President, American Physical Society
- 1947: Research Corporation Award
- 1948: United States Medal for Merit
- 1955: Featured on the cover of Time
- 1967: Governor's Award, National Academy of Television Arts & Sciences
- 1969: Lehman Award, New York Academy of Sciences
- 1974: Golden Plate Award, Academy of Achievement
- 1982: Vannevar Bush Award, National Science Foundation

DuBridge received twenty-eight honorary degrees from institutions including Columbia University, the University of Wisconsin–Madison, and the University of Rochester.

=== Other tributes ===
- Minor planet 5678 DuBridge discovered by Eleanor Helin is named in his honor.
- The Lee A. DuBridge Professorship was established at Caltech by its trustees.

== Selected works ==
- Hughes, Arthur L.; DuBridge, Lee A. (1932). Photoelectric Phenomena. New York: McGraw-Hill.
- DuBridge, Lee A. (1935). New Theories of the Photoelectric Effect. Paris: Hermann et Cie.
- DuBridge, Lee A. (1946). "History and activities of the Radiation Laboratory of the Massachusetts Institute of Technology". Review of Scientific Instruments. 17 (1): 1–5. doi:10.1063/1.1770386.
- DuBridge, Lee A. (1960). Introduction to Space. New York: Columbia University Press.

Academic offices
Preceded by Robert Millikan	2nd President of the California Institute of Technology; 1946–1969	Succeeded by Harold Brown
Government offices
Preceded by Oliver Buckley	Chairman of the President's Science Advisory Committee; 1952–1956	Succeeded by Isidor Rabi
Preceded by Donald Hornig	Director of the Office of Science and Technology; 1969–1970	Succeeded by Ed David
