= William D. McElroy =

American biochemist (1917–1999)

William David McElroy

Fifth Chancellor of the University of California San Diego
- In office 1972–1980
- Preceded by: Herbert York
- Succeeded by: Richard C. Atkinson

3rd Director of the National Science Foundation
- In office 1969–1972
- President: Richard Nixon
- Preceded by: Leland J. Haworth
- Succeeded by: Guyford Stever

Personal details
- Born: 22 January 1917 Rogers, Texas, USA
- Died: 22 February 1999 (aged 82) San Diego, California, USA
- Spouse(s): Nella Amelia Winch (m.1940); Marlene Anderegg DeLuca (1967–1987†); Olga Robles (1997–1999)
- Education: Pasadena Junior College; Stanford University; Reed College; Princeton University
- Profession: Biochemistry
- Institutions: Johns Hopkins University; Office of Naval Research; National Institute of Health; National Science Foundation; University of California San Diego
- Scientific career
- Known for: Editing several symposium valumes (with H. Bentley Glass), including The Chemical Basis of Heredity
- Awards: Howard N. Potts Medal (1971)
- Fields: Biochemistry
- Institutions: Johns Hopkins University; Office of Naval Research; National Institute of Health; National Science Foundation; University of California San Diego
- Thesis: The application of the theory of absolute reaction rates to the action of narcotics (1943)
- Doctoral advisor: E. Newton Harvey
- Notable students: John Woodland Hastings

William David McElroy (22 January 1917 – 17 February 1999) was an American biochemist and academic administrator.

== Biography ==
=== Early years ===
McElroy was born to William D. McElroy and Ora Shipley in Rogers, Texas. After graduating from McAllen High School in McAllen, Texas in 1935, he attended Pasadena Junior College in California, and went on to Stanford University on a football scholarship where he received his bachelor's degree in 1937. He earned his master's degree in biology at Reed College and his PhD at Princeton University in 1943.

=== Career ===
After college, McElroy became a professor at Johns Hopkins University. He initiated an independent research program in bioluminescence, recruiting students to collect fireflies to perform experiments. He discovered the key role that luciferase and adenosine triphosphate (ATP) play in the process.

He began working with the Office of Naval Research and the National Institute of Health in the 1950s, and became a member of the President's Science Advisory Committee to President John F. Kennedy in 1962. He later became the director of the National Science Foundation from 1969 to 1972. He also served as the president of the American Association for the Advancement of Science from 1975 to 1976. He became chancellor of the University of California San Diego from 1972 to 1980.

In collaboration with H. Bentley Glass he edited several symposium volumes, including The chemical basis of heredity, with authors including François Jacob, Erwin Chargaff, Severo Ochoa, Arthur Kornberg, Max Delbrück and Francis Crick. In his review Conrad Waddington wrote as follows:

It deals with the most fundamental problem of analytical biology — the chemical nature and functioning of the basic units on which biological organisms are based. The contributors are ... of the very highest standard ... Workers in the large field of chromosomes, genes, nucleic acids and viruses will find the book essential.

He was awarded the Howard N. Potts Medal in 1971. He was also an elected member of the American Academy of Arts and Sciences, the United States National Academy of Sciences, and the American Philosophical Society.

In 1981, McElroy became a founding member of the World Cultural Council.

=== Personal life ===
McElroy married three times. He was first married to Nella Amelia Winch in 1940 with whom he had four children: Ann, Mary, Thomas and William, Jr. His second marriage was in 1967 to biochemist Marlene Anderegg DeLuca. Their one child is Eric Gene. After being widowed in 1987, he married again in 1997 to Olga Robles who survived him.

== Honors ==
McElroy Ridge in the Victory Mountains of Victoria Land, Antarctica was named after McElroy by the Advisory Committee on Antarctic Names.

Government offices
Preceded by Leland J. Haworth	Director of the National Science Foundation; July 1969 – January 1972	Succeeded by Guyford Stever
Academic offices
Preceded by Herbert York	Chancellor of the University of California San Diego; 1972–1980	Succeeded by Richard C. Atkinson
