= Vannevar Bush Award =

American science and technology award

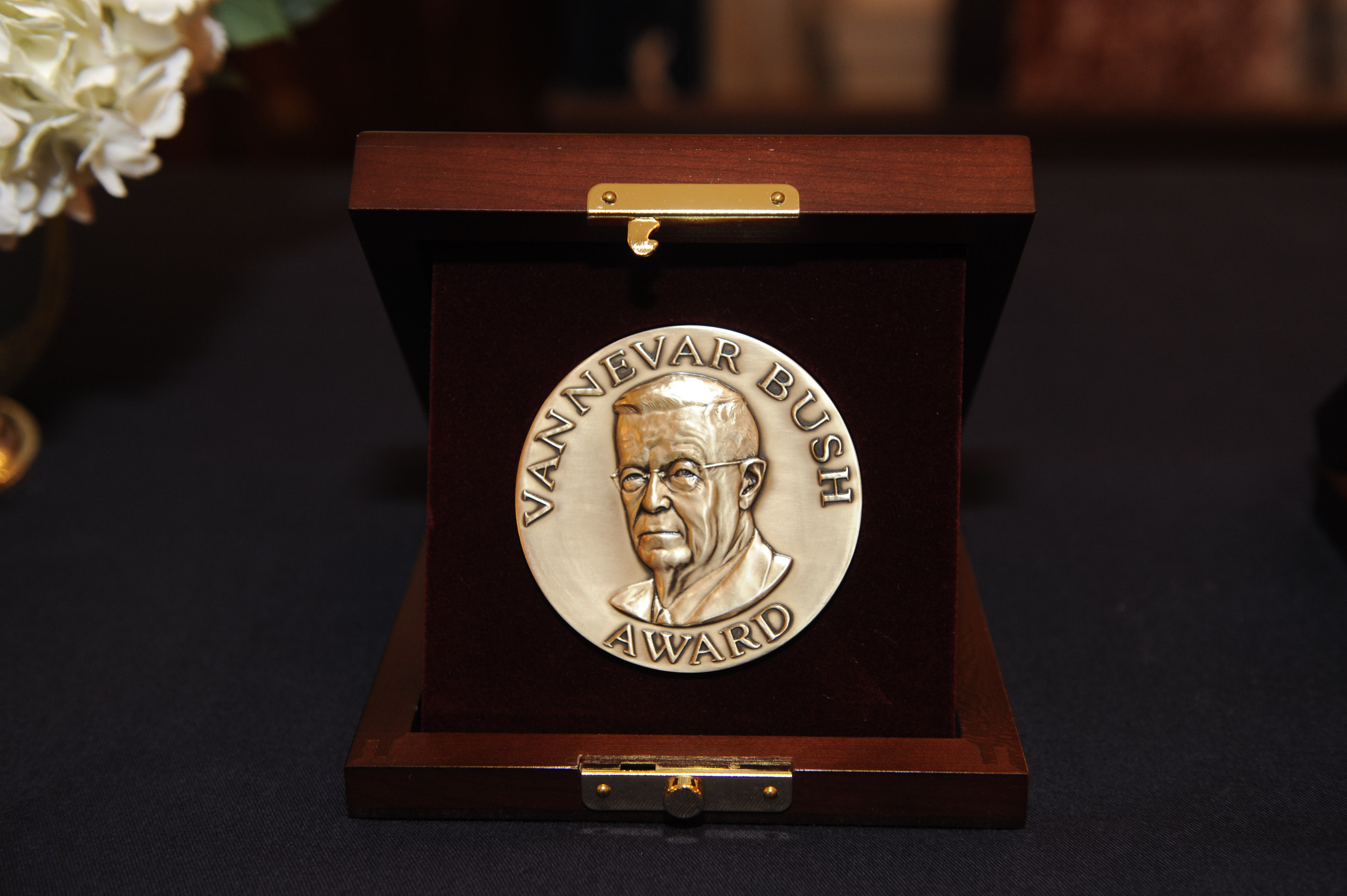
Vannevar Bush Award

The National Science Board established the Vannevar Bush Award (/væˈniːvər/ van-NEE-vər) in 1980 to honor Vannevar Bush's unique contributions to public service. The annual award recognizes an individual who, through public service activities in science and technology, has made an outstanding "contribution toward the welfare of mankind and the Nation." The recipient of the award receives a bronze medal struck in the memory of Dr. Bush.

Vannevar Bush (1890–1974) was a prominent scientist, adviser to US presidents, and the force behind the establishment of the National Science Foundation. In 1945, at the request of President Franklin D. Roosevelt, he wrote a famous essay entitled Science, the Endless Frontier which recommended that a foundation be established by the United States Congress to serve as a focal point for the US federal government's support and encouragement of research and education in science and technology as well as the development of a national science policy. The legislation creating the National Science Foundation was signed by President Harry S. Truman on May 10, 1950.

== List of winners ==
Source: National Science Board

- 1980: James R. Killian, Jr.
- 1981: William O. Baker
- 1982: Lee A. DuBridge
- 1983: Frederick Seitz
- 1984: Roger R. Revelle
- 1985: Hans A. Bethe
- 1986: I. I. Rabi
- 1987: David Packard
- 1988: Glenn T. Seaborg
- 1989: Linus Pauling
- 1990: nobody awarded
- 1991: James A. Van Allen
- 1992: Jerome B. Wiesner
- 1993: Norman Hackerman
- 1994: Frank Press
- 1995: Norman F. Ramsey, Jr.
- 1996: Philip H. Abelson
- 1997: H. Guyford Stever
- 1998: Robert M. White
- 1999: Maxine Frank Singer
- 2000: Herbert F. York and Norman Borlaug
- 2001: Harold Varmus and Lewis M. Branscomb
- 2002: Erich Bloch
- 2003: Richard C. Atkinson
- 2004: Mary L. Good
- 2005: Robert W. Galvin
- 2006: Charles H. Townes and Raj Reddy
- 2007: Shirley Ann Jackson
- 2008: Norman Augustine
- 2009: Mildred Dresselhaus
- 2010: Bruce M. Alberts
- 2011: Charles M. Vest
- 2012: Leon M. Lederman
- 2013: Neal F. Lane
- 2014: Richard Tapia
- 2015: James J. Duderstadt
- 2016: Robert J. Birgeneau
- 2017: Rita R. Colwell
- 2018: Jane Lubchenco
- 2019: Walter E. Massey
- 2020: Roderic I. Pettigrew
- 2021: Ralph E. Gomory
- 2023: Richard Garwin

== See also ==
- List of general science and technology awards
- Prizes named after people
- Enrico Fermi Award
