= President's Science Advisory Committee =

Advising body to the US President

President's Science Advisory Committee (PSAC)
Committee overview
- Formed: November 21, 1957; 68 years ago
- Preceding Committee: Science Advisory Committee (SAC)
- Dissolved: 1961; 65 years ago
- Superseding agencies: Office of Science and Technology (OST); Office of Science and Technology Policy (OSTP)
- Committee executive: James R. Killian Jr., First Director
- Key document: "Meeting the Threat of Surprise Attack" (February 14, 1955)

The President's Science Advisory Committee (PSAC) was created on November 21, 1957, by President of the United States Dwight D. Eisenhower, as a direct response to the Soviet launching of the Sputnik 1 and Sputnik 2 satellites. PSAC was an upgrade and move to the White House of the Science Advisory Committee (SAC) established in 1951 by President Harry S. Truman, as part of the Office of Defense Mobilization (ODM). Its purpose was to advise the president on scientific matters in general, and those related to defense issues in particular. Eisenhower appointed James R. Killian as PSAC's first director.

In 1961, President John F. Kennedy renamed the agency the Office of Science and Technology (OST). This lasted until Richard Nixon's administration in 1973. In 1976 the Office of Science and Technology Policy was established.

== First report ==
The first report of the newly formed Science Advisory Committee, commonly known as the Killian Report (February 14, 1955, officially "Meeting the Threat of Surprise Attack"), suggested that any defense in the nuclear age was pointless, and outlined scenarios in which up to 90% of the US population would die in an all-out exchange. It suggested the only defense was deterrence, and set in motion the policies that would later be known as mutually assured destruction. It also suggested that the lag in US missile technology was a systemic problem in the education system, which led to widespread reform in the public school system.

== Committee members ==
The President's Science Advisory Committee included many noteworthy scientists and non-scientists, including:

- Oliver E. Buckley (Chairman 1951–1952)
- Lee Alvin DuBridge (Chairman 1952–1956)
- Isadore I. Rabi (Chairman 1956–1957)
- James R. Killian (Chairman 1957–1959)
- George Kistiakowsky (Chairman 1959–1961)
- Jerome Wiesner (Chairman 1961–1964)
- Donald F. Hornig (Chairman 1964–1969)
- Lee A. DuBridge (Chairman 1969–1970)
- Edward E. David Jr. (Chairman 1970–1973)
- Lloyd Berkner
- Hans Bethe
- Lewis Branscomb
- Melvin Calvin
- Britton Chance
- Thomas Gold
- Philip Handler
- Franklin Long
- Gordon J.F. MacDonald
- William McElroy
- George Pake
- Frank Press
- Edward Purcell
- Frederick Seitz
- Charles P. Slichter
- Alvin Martin Weinberg
- Benjamin Willis 1962–1966
- Herbert York

== PSAC's activities ==
The committee had no operating responsibilities. Its purpose was to provide advisory opinions and analysis on science and technology matters to the entire Federal Government and specifically to the President. About one-half of the panels' studies were directed to the question of how science could support the United States' national security objectives. The creation of Arms Limitations and Control, Limited Warfare, and Space Science Panels, for example, reflected the national security concerns of the committee. Two important themes common to many of the studies are the budgetary problems of funding projects, and the administration's concern over competing successfully with the Soviet Union in science and technology.

In 1965, the PSAC environmental pollution panel issued a major report outlining water, air, and soil pollution, from sewage and lead pollution to atmospheric carbon dioxide.

During the administration of President John F. Kennedy, the PSAC advised against pursuing a human Moon landing due to cost. Kennedy rejected the committee's recommendation and aggressively pursued the goal of putting an American on the Moon before the end of the decade.

== The end of the PSAC ==
In 1973, shortly after winning re-election in a landslide, President Richard Nixon, eliminated the committee. Nixon was frustrated with what he saw as a lack of support from the committee for his administration's agenda, including a member of the committee that spoke publicly against his administration's support for research into supersonic transport. The White House Office of Science and Technology and the United States Congress were made to rely on federal agencies for guidance in scientific policy. A similar entity, the United States President's Council of Advisors on Science and Technology (PCAST), was established in 1990 by President George H. W. Bush, and renewed by three subsequent presidents.

== See also ==
- JASON (advisory group)
- Technology policy
