= Vannevar Bush =

American science official (1890–1974)

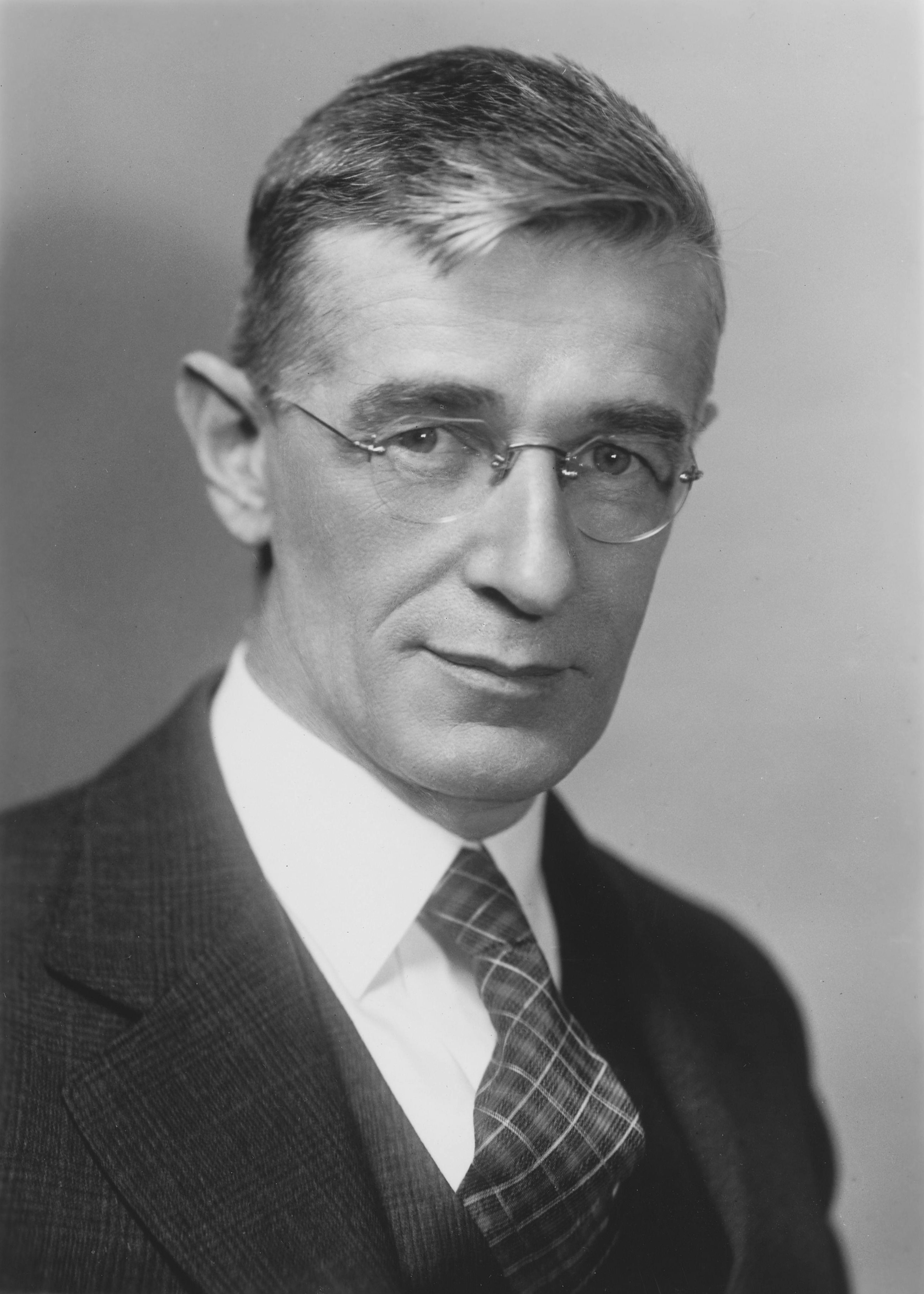
- Bush in 1938

Chairman of the Research and Development Board
- In office September 30, 1947 – October 14, 1948
- President: Harry S. Truman
- Preceded by: Position established
- Succeeded by: Karl Compton

Director of the Office of Scientific Research and Development
- In office June 28, 1941 – December 31, 1947
- President: Franklin D. Roosevelt; Harry S. Truman
- Preceded by: Position established
- Succeeded by: Oliver Buckley (Science Advisory Committee, 1951)

Chairman of the National Defense Research Committee
- In office June 27, 1940 – June 28, 1941
- President: Franklin D. Roosevelt
- Preceded by: Position established
- Succeeded by: James B. Conant

Chairman of the National Advisory Committee for Aeronautics
- In office October 19, 1939 – June 28, 1941
- President: Franklin D. Roosevelt
- Preceded by: Joseph Ames
- Succeeded by: Jerome Hunsaker

Personal details
- Born: March 11, 1890 Everett, Massachusetts, U.S.
- Died: June 28, 1974 (aged 84) Belmont, Massachusetts, U.S.
- Education: Tufts University (BS, MS); Massachusetts Institute of Technology (DEng)
- Awards: Edison Medal (1943); Hoover Medal (1946); Medal for Merit (1948); IRI Medal (1949); John Fritz Medal (1951); John J. Carty Award for the Advancement of Science (1953); William Procter Prize (1954); National Medal of Science (1963); See below
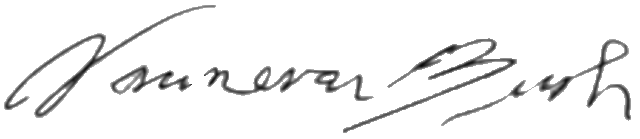
- Signature
- Scientific career
- Fields: Electrical engineering
- Workplaces: Tufts University; Massachusetts Institute of Technology; Carnegie Institution of Washington
- Thesis: Oscillating-current circuits; an extension of the theory of generalized angular velocities, with applications to the coupled circuit and the artificial transmission line (1916)
- Doctoral advisor: Dugald C. Jackson; Arthur E. Kennelly
- Notable students: Claude Shannon; Frederick Terman; Charles Manneback; Edward L. Bowles; Perry O. Crawford Jr. Samuel H. Caldwell

Vannevar Bush (/væˈniːvɑːr/ van-NEE-var; March 11, 1890 – June 28, 1974) was an American engineer, inventor and science administrator, who during World War II headed the U.S. Office of Scientific Research and Development (OSRD), through which almost all wartime military R&D was carried out, including important developments in radar and the initiation and early administration of the Manhattan Project. He emphasized the importance of scientific research to national security and economic well-being, and was chiefly responsible for the movement that led to the creation of the National Science Foundation.

Bush joined the Department of Electrical Engineering at the Massachusetts Institute of Technology (MIT) in 1919, and founded the company that became Raytheon in 1922. Bush became vice president of MIT and dean of the MIT School of Engineering in 1932, and president of the Carnegie Institution of Washington in 1938.

During his career, Bush patented a string of his own inventions. He is known particularly for his engineering work on analog computers, and for the memex. Starting in 1927, Bush constructed a differential analyzer, a mechanical analog computer with some digital components that could solve differential equations with as many as 18 independent variables. An offshoot of the work at MIT by Bush and others was the beginning of digital circuit design theory. The memex, which he began developing in the 1930s (heavily influenced by Emanuel Goldberg's "Statistical Machine" from 1928) was a hypothetical adjustable microfilm viewer with a structure analogous to that of hypertext. The memex and Bush's 1945 essay "As We May Think" influenced generations of computer scientists, who drew inspiration from his vision of the future.

Bush was appointed to the National Advisory Committee for Aeronautics (NACA) in 1938, and soon became its chairman. As chairman of the National Defense Research Committee (NDRC), and later director of OSRD, Bush coordinated the activities of some six thousand leading American scientists in the application of science to warfare. Bush was a well-known policymaker and public intellectual during World War II, when he was in effect the first presidential science advisor. As head of NDRC and OSRD, he initiated the Manhattan Project, and ensured that it received top priority from the highest levels of government. In Science, The Endless Frontier, his 1945 report to the president of the United States, Bush called for an expansion of government support for science, and he pressed for the creation of the National Science Foundation.

== Early life and education ==
Vannevar Bush was born in Everett, Massachusetts, on March 11, 1890. He was the third child and only son of Richard Perry Bush, the local Universalist pastor, and his wife Emma Linwood (née Paine), the daughter of a prominent Provincetown family. He had two older sisters, Edith and Reba. He was named after John Vannevar, an old friend of the family who had attended Tufts College with Perry. The family moved to Chelsea, Massachusetts, in 1892, and Bush graduated from Chelsea High School in 1909.

Bush graduated from Tufts College, like his father before him. A popular student, he was vice president of his sophomore class, and president of his junior class. During his senior year, he managed the football team. He became a member of the Alpha Tau Omega fraternity, and dated Phoebe Clara Davis, who also came from Chelsea. Tufts allowed students to gain a master's degree in four years simultaneously with a bachelor's degree. For his master's thesis, Bush invented and patented a "profile tracer". This was a mapping device for assisting surveyors that looked like a lawn mower. It had two bicycle wheels, and a pen that plotted the terrain over which it traveled. It was the first of a string of inventions. On graduation in 1913 he received both Bachelor of Science and Master of Science degrees.

After graduation, Bush worked at General Electric (GE) in Schenectady, New York, for $14 a week. As a "test man," he assessed equipment to ensure that it was safe. He transferred to GE's plant in Pittsfield, Massachusetts, to work on high voltage transformers, but after a fire broke out at the plant, Bush and the other test men were suspended. He returned to Tufts in October 1914 to teach mathematics, and spent the 1915 summer break working at the Brooklyn Navy Yard as an electrical inspector. Bush was awarded a $1,500 scholarship to study at Clark University as a doctoral student of Arthur Gordon Webster, but Webster wanted Bush to study acoustics, a popular field at the time. Bush preferred to quit rather than study a subject that did not interest him.

Bush subsequently enrolled in the Massachusetts Institute of Technology (MIT) electrical engineering program. Spurred by the need for enough financial security to marry, he submitted his thesis, entitled Oscillating-Current Circuits: An Extension of the Theory of Generalized Angular Velocities, with Applications to the Coupled Circuit and the Artificial Transmission Line, in April 1916. His adviser, Arthur Edwin Kennelly, demanded more work from him, but Bush refused, and Kennelly was overruled by the department chairman. Bush received his doctorate in engineering jointly from MIT and Harvard University. He married Davis in August 1916. They had two sons: Richard Davis Bush and John Hathaway Bush.

== Early engineering activities ==
Bush accepted a job with Tufts, where he became involved with the American Radio and Research Corporation (AMRAD), which began broadcasting music from the campus on March 8, 1916. The station owner, Harold Power, hired him to run the company's laboratory, at a salary greater than that which Bush drew from Tufts. In 1917, following the United States' entry into World War I, he went to work with the National Research Council. He attempted to develop a means of detecting submarines by measuring the disturbance in the Earth's magnetic field. His device worked as designed, but only from a wooden ship; attempts to get it to work on a metal ship such as a destroyer failed.

Bush left Tufts in 1919, although he remained employed by AMRAD, and joined the Department of Electrical Engineering at the Massachusetts Institute of Technology (MIT), where he worked under Dugald C. Jackson. In 1922, he collaborated with fellow MIT professor William H. Timbie on Principles of Electrical Engineering, an introductory textbook. AMRAD's lucrative contracts from World War I had been cancelled, and Bush attempted to reverse the company's fortunes by developing a thermostatic switch invented by Al Spencer, an AMRAD technician, on his own time. AMRAD's management was not interested in the device, but had no objection to its sale. Bush found backing from Laurence K. Marshall and Richard S. Aldrich to create the Spencer Thermostat Company, which hired Bush as a consultant. The new company soon had revenues in excess of a million dollars. It merged with General Plate Company to form Metals & Controls Corporation in 1931, and with Texas Instruments in 1959. Texas Instruments sold it to Bain Capital in 2006, and it became a separate company again as Sensata Technologies in 2010.

In 1924, Bush and Marshall teamed up with physicist Charles G. Smith, who had invented a voltage-regulator tube called the S-tube. The device enabled radios, which had previously required two different types of batteries, to operate from mains power. Marshall had raised $25,000 to set up the American Appliance Company on July 7, 1922, to build silent refrigerators, with Bush and Smith among its five directors, but changed course and renamed it the Raytheon Company, to make and market the S-tube. The venture made Bush wealthy, and Raytheon ultimately became a large electronics company and defense contractor.

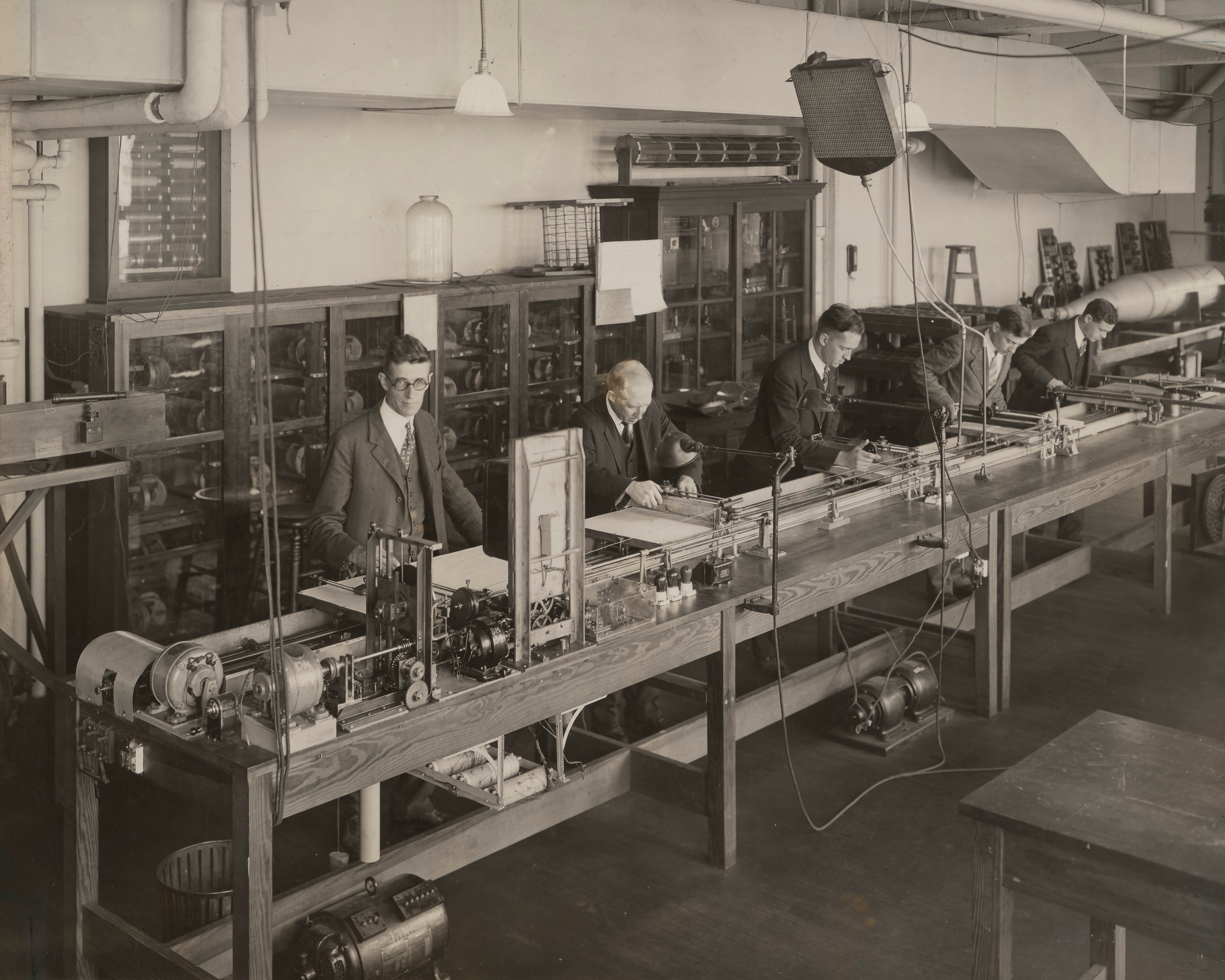
Bush with the product integraph, predecessor to the differential analyzer (1927)

Starting in 1927, Bush constructed a differential analyzer, an analog computer that could solve differential equations with as many as 18 independent variables. This invention arose from previous work performed by Herbert R. Stewart, one of Bush's master's students, who at Bush's suggestion created the integraph, a device for solving first-order differential equations, in 1925. Another student, Harold Hazen, proposed extending the device to handle second-order differential equations. Bush immediately realized the potential of such an invention, for these were much more difficult to solve, but also quite common in physics. Under Bush's supervision, Hazen was able to construct the differential analyzer, a table-like array of shafts and pens that mechanically simulated and plotted the desired equation. Unlike earlier designs that were purely mechanical, the differential analyzer had both electrical and mechanical components. Among the engineers who made use of the differential analyzer was General Electric's Edith Clarke, who used it to solve problems relating to electric power transmission. For developing the differential analyzer, Bush was awarded the Franklin Institute's Louis E. Levy Medal in 1928.

Bush taught Boolean algebra, circuit theory, and operational calculus according to the methods of Oliver Heaviside while Samuel Wesley Stratton was President of MIT. When Harold Jeffreys in Cambridge, England, offered his mathematical treatment in Operational Methods in Mathematical Physics (1927), Bush responded with his seminal textbook Operational Circuit Analysis (1929) for instructing electrical engineering students. In the preface he wrote:

I write as an engineer and do not pretend to be a mathematician. I lean for support, and expect always to lean, upon the mathematician, just as I must lean upon the chemist, the physician, or the lawyer. Norbert Wiener has patiently guided me around many a mathematical pitfall ... he has written an appendix to this text on certain mathematical points. I did not know an engineer and a mathematician could have such good times together. I only wish that I could get the real vital grasp of mathematics that he has of the basic principles of physics.

Parry Moon and Stratton were acknowledged, as was M.S. Vallarta who "wrote the first set of class notes which I used."

An offshoot of the work at MIT was the beginning of digital circuit design theory by one of Bush's graduate students, Claude Shannon. Working on the analytical engine, Shannon described the application of Boolean algebra to electronic circuits in his landmark master's thesis, A Symbolic Analysis of Relay and Switching Circuits. In 1935, Bush was approached by OP-20-G, which was searching for an electronic device to aid in codebreaking. Bush was paid a $10,000 fee to design the Rapid Analytical Machine (RAM). The project went over budget and was not delivered until 1938, when it was found to be unreliable in service. Nonetheless, it was an important step toward creating such a device.

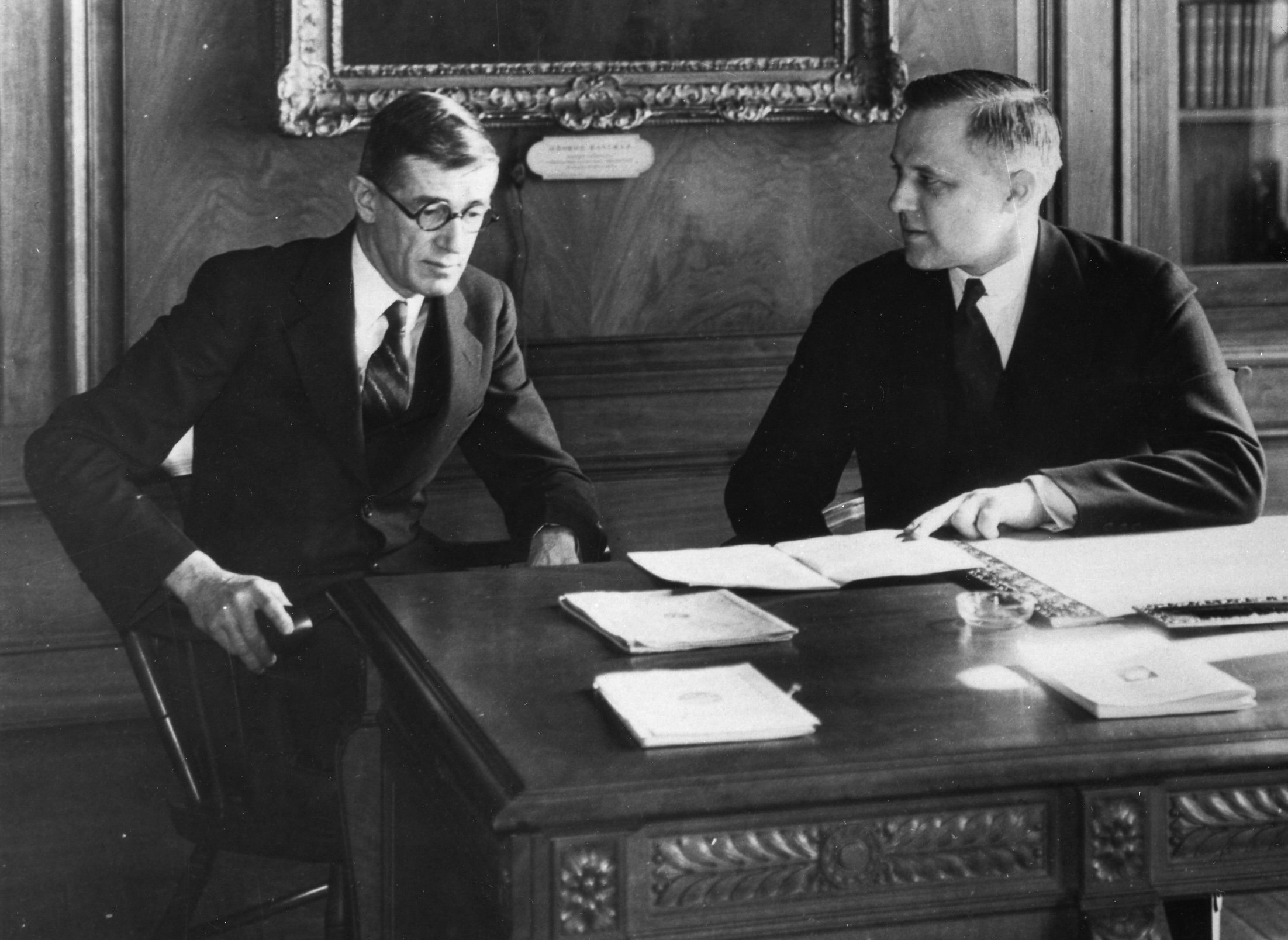
In 1932, Compton appointed Bush as MIT's Vice President

The reform of MIT's administration began in 1930, with the appointment of Karl T. Compton as president. Bush and Compton soon clashed over the issue of limiting the amount of outside consultancy by professors, a battle Bush quickly lost, but the two men soon built a solid professional relationship. Compton appointed Bush to the newly created post of vice president in 1932. That year Bush also became the dean of the MIT School of Engineering. The two positions came with a salary of $12,000 plus $6,000 for expenses per annum.

The companies Bush helped to found and the technologies he brought to the market made him financially secure, so he was able to pursue academic and scientific studies that he felt made the world better in the years before and after World War II.

== World War II ==
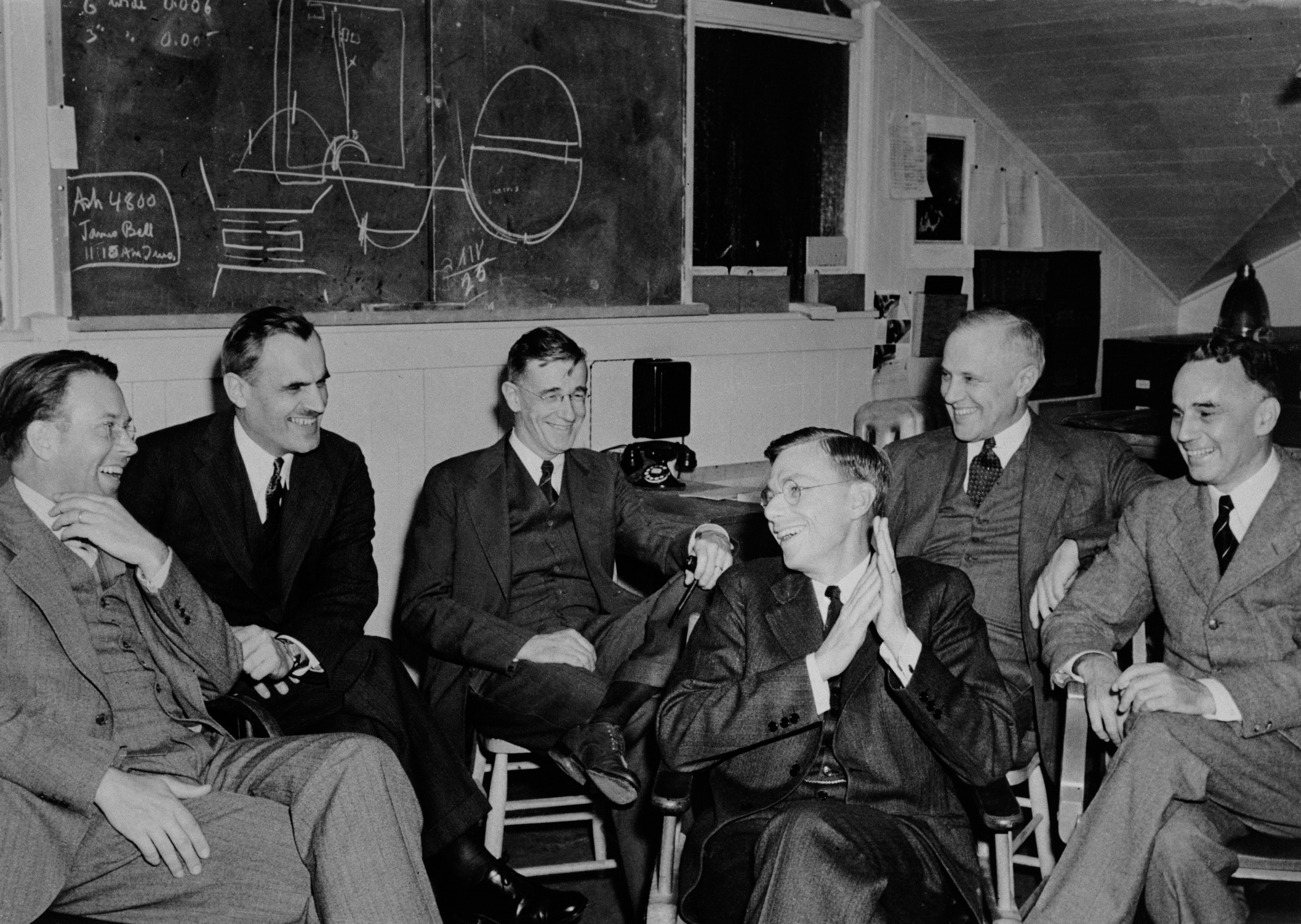
Bush attending a meeting at the University of California, Berkeley in 1940. From left to right: Ernest O. Lawrence, Arthur H. Compton, Bush, James B. Conant, Karl T. Compton, and Alfred L. Loomis

=== Carnegie Institution for Science ===
In May 1938, Bush accepted a prestigious appointment as president of the Carnegie Institution of Washington (CIW), which had been founded in Washington, D.C. Also known as the Carnegie Institution for Science, it had an endowment of $33 million, and annually spent $1.5 million in research, most of which was carried out at its eight major laboratories. Bush became its president on January 1, 1939, with a salary of $25,000. He was then able to influence research policy in the United States at the highest level, and could informally advise the government on scientific matters. Bush soon discovered that the CIW had serious financial problems, and he had to ask the Carnegie Corporation for additional funding.

Bush clashed over leadership of the institute with Cameron Forbes, CIW's board chairman, and with his predecessor, John Merriam, who continued to offer unwanted advice. A major embarrassment to them all was Harry H. Laughlin, the head of the Eugenics Record Office, whose activities Merriam had attempted to curtail without success. Bush made it a priority to remove him, regarding him as a scientific fraud, and one of his first acts was to ask for a review of Laughlin's work. In June 1938, Bush asked Laughlin to retire, offering him an annuity, which Laughlin reluctantly accepted. The Eugenics Record Office was renamed the Genetics Record Office, its funding was drastically cut, and it was closed completely in 1944. Senator Robert Reynolds attempted to get Laughlin reinstated, but Bush informed the trustees that an inquiry into Laughlin would "show him to be physically incapable of directing an office, and an investigation of his scientific standing would be equally conclusive."

Bush wanted the institute to concentrate on hard science. He gutted Carnegie's archeology program, setting the field back many years in the United States. He saw little value in the humanities and social sciences, and slashed funding for Isis, a journal dedicated to the history of science and technology and its cultural influence. Bush later explained that "I have a great reservation about these studies where somebody goes out and interviews a bunch of people and reads a lot of stuff and writes a book and puts it on a shelf and nobody ever reads it."

=== National Advisory Committee for Aeronautics ===
On August 23, 1938, Bush was appointed to the National Advisory Committee for Aeronautics (NACA), the predecessor of NASA. Its chairman Joseph Sweetman Ames became ill, and Bush, as vice chairman, soon had to act in his place. In December 1938, NACA asked for $11 million to establish a new aeronautical research laboratory in Sunnyvale, California, to supplement the existing Langley Memorial Aeronautical Laboratory. The California location was chosen for its proximity to some of the largest aviation corporations. This decision was supported by the chief of the United States Army Air Corps, Major General Henry H. Arnold, and by the head of the navy's Bureau of Aeronautics, Rear Admiral Arthur B. Cook, who between them were planning to spend $225 million on new aircraft in the year ahead. However, Congress was not convinced of its value, and Bush had to appear before the Senate Appropriations Committee on April 5, 1939. It was a frustrating experience for Bush, since he had never appeared before Congress before, and the senators were not swayed by his arguments. Further lobbying was required before funding for the new center, known as the Ames Research Center, was finally approved. By this time, war had broken out in Europe, and the inferiority of American aircraft engines was apparent, in particular the Allison V-1710 which performed poorly at high altitudes and had to be removed from the P-51 Mustang in favor of the British Rolls-Royce Merlin engine. The NACA asked for funding to build a third center in Ohio, which became the Glenn Research Center. Following Ames's retirement in October 1939, Bush became chairman of the NACA, with George J. Mead as his deputy. Bush remained a member of the NACA until November 1948.

=== National Defense Research Committee ===
During World War I, Bush had become aware of poor cooperation between civilian scientists and the military. Concerned about the lack of coordination in scientific research and the requirements of defense mobilization, Bush proposed the creation of a general directive agency in the federal government, which he discussed with his colleagues. He had the secretary of NACA prepare a draft of the proposed National Defense Research Committee (NDRC) to be presented to Congress, but after the Germans invaded France in May 1940, Bush decided speed was important and approached President Franklin D. Roosevelt directly. Through the President's uncle, Frederic Delano, Bush managed to set up a meeting with Roosevelt on June 12, 1940, to which he brought a single sheet of paper describing the agency. Roosevelt approved the proposal in 15 minutes, writing "OK – FDR" on the sheet.

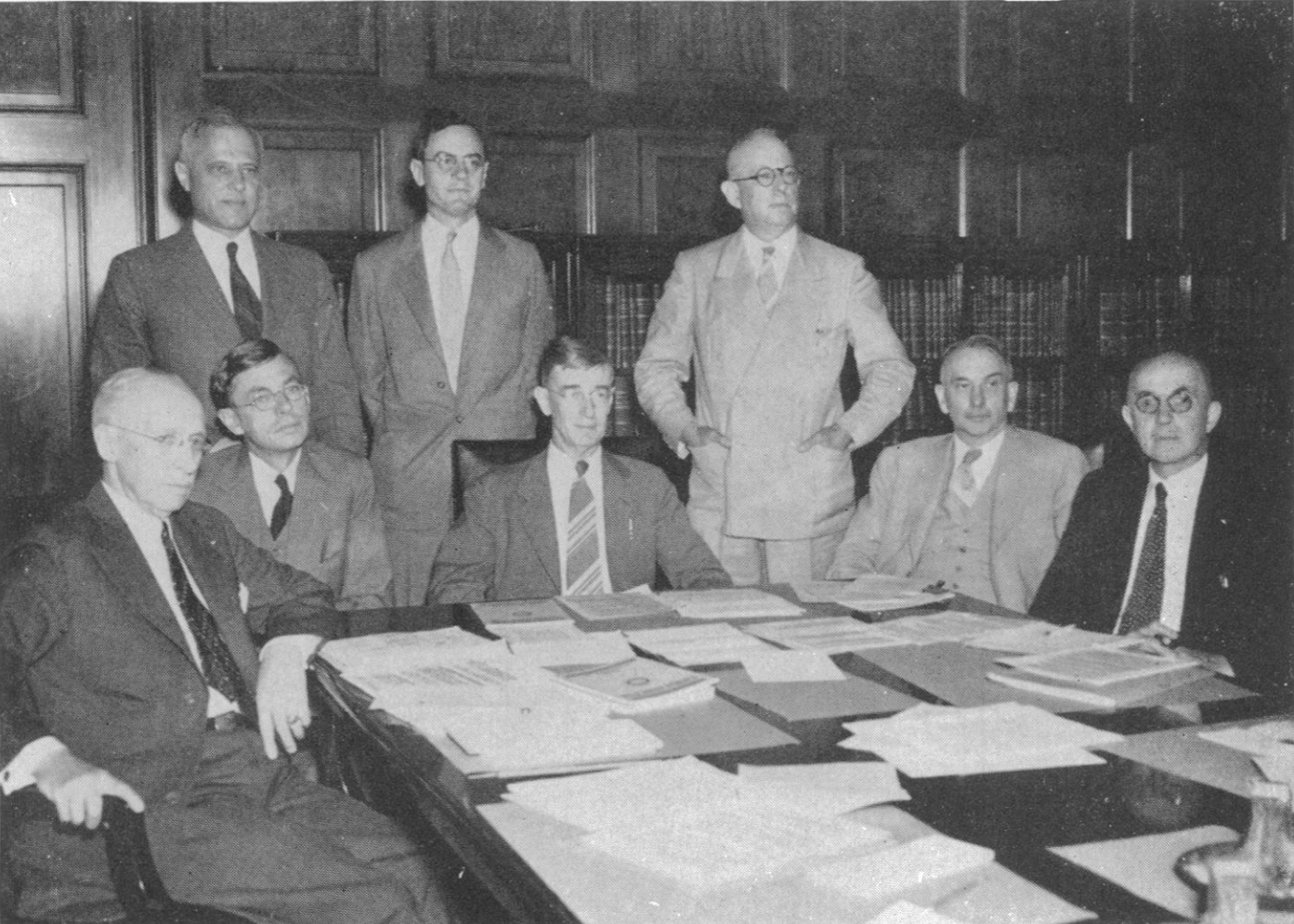
Bush chairing the first NDRC meeting (July 2, 1940)

With Bush as chairman, the NDRC was functioning even before the agency was officially established by order of the Council of National Defense on June 27, 1940. The organization operated financially on a hand-to-mouth basis with monetary support from the president's emergency fund. Bush appointed four leading scientists to the NDRC: Karl Taylor Compton (president of MIT), James B. Conant (president of Harvard University), Frank B. Jewett (president of the National Academy of Sciences and chairman of the Board of Directors of Bell Laboratories), and Richard C. Tolman (dean of the graduate school at Caltech); Rear Admiral Harold G. Bowen, Sr. and Brigadier General George V. Strong represented the military. The civilians already knew each other well, which allowed the organization to begin functioning immediately. The NDRC established itself in the administration building at the Carnegie Institution of Washington. Each member of the committee was assigned an area of responsibility, while Bush handled coordination. A small number of projects reported to him directly, such as the S-1 Section. Compton's deputy, Alfred Loomis, said that "of the men whose death in the Summer of 1940 would have been the greatest calamity for America, the President is first, and Dr. Bush would be second or third."

Bush was fond of saying that "if he made any important contribution to the war effort at all, it would be to get the Army and Navy to tell each other what they were doing." He established a cordial relationship with Secretary of War Henry L. Stimson, and Stimson's assistant, Harvey H. Bundy, who found Bush "impatient" and "vain", but said he was "one of the most important, able men I ever knew". Bush's relationship with the navy was more turbulent. Bowen, the director of the Naval Research Laboratory (NRL), saw the NDRC as a bureaucratic rival, and recommended abolishing it. A series of bureaucratic battles ended with the NRL placed under the Bureau of Ships, and Secretary of the Navy Frank Knox placing an unsatisfactory fitness report in Bowen's personnel file. After the war, Bowen would again try to create a rival to the NDRC inside the navy.

On August 31, 1940, Bush met with Henry Tizard, and arranged a series of meetings between the NDRC and the Tizard Mission, a British scientific delegation. At a meeting on September 19, 1940, the Americans described Loomis and Compton's microwave research. They had an experimental 10 cm wavelength short wave radar, but admitted that it did not have enough power and that they were at a dead end. Taffy Bowen and John Cockcroft of the Tizard Mission then produced a cavity magnetron, a device more advanced than anything the Americans had seen, with a power output of around 10 kW at 10 cm, enough to spot the periscope of a surfaced submarine at night from an aircraft. To exploit the invention, Bush decided to create a special laboratory. The NDRC allocated the new laboratory a budget of $455,000 for its first year. Loomis suggested that the lab should be run by the Carnegie Institution, but Bush convinced him that it would best be run by MIT. The Radiation Laboratory, as it came to be known, tested its airborne radar from an Army B-18 on March 27, 1941. By mid-1941, it had developed SCR-584 radar, a mobile radar fire control system for antiaircraft guns.

In September 1940, Norbert Wiener approached Bush with a proposal to build a digital computer. Bush declined to provide NDRC funding for it on the grounds that he did not believe that it could be completed before the end of the war. The supporters of digital computers were disappointed at the decision, which they attributed to a preference for outmoded analog technology. In June 1943, the Army provided $500,000 to build the computer, which became ENIAC, the first general-purpose electronic computer. Having delayed its funding, Bush's prediction proved correct as ENIAC was not completed until December 1945, after the war had ended. His critics saw his attitude as a failure of vision.

=== Office of Scientific Research and Development ===
On June 28, 1941, Roosevelt established the Office of Scientific Research and Development (OSRD) with the signing of Executive Order 8807. Bush became director of the OSRD while Conant succeeded him as chairman of the NDRC, which was subsumed into the OSRD. The OSRD was on a firmer financial footing than the NDRC since it received funding from Congress, and had the resources and the authority to develop weapons and technologies with or without the military. Furthermore, the OSRD had a broader mandate than the NDRC, moving into additional areas such as medical research and the mass production of penicillin and sulfa drugs. The organization grew to 850 full-time employees, and produced between 30,000 and 35,000 reports. The OSRD was involved in some 2,500 contracts, worth in excess of $536 million.

Bush's method of management at the OSRD was to direct overall policy, while delegating supervision of divisions to qualified colleagues and letting them do their jobs without interference. He attempted to interpret the mandate of the OSRD as narrowly as possible to avoid overtaxing his office and to prevent duplicating the efforts of other agencies. Bush would often ask: "Will it help to win a war; this war?" Other challenges involved obtaining adequate funds from the president and Congress and determining apportionment of research among government, academic, and industrial facilities. His most difficult problems, and also greatest successes, were keeping the confidence of the military, which distrusted the ability of civilians to observe security regulations and devise practical solutions, and opposing conscription of young scientists into the armed forces. This became especially difficult as the army's manpower crisis really began to bite in 1944. In all, the OSRD requested deferments for some 9,725 employees of OSRD contractors, of which all but 63 were granted. In his obituary, The New York Times described Bush as "a master craftsman at steering around obstacles, whether they were technical or political or bull-headed generals and admirals."

==== Proximity fuze ====
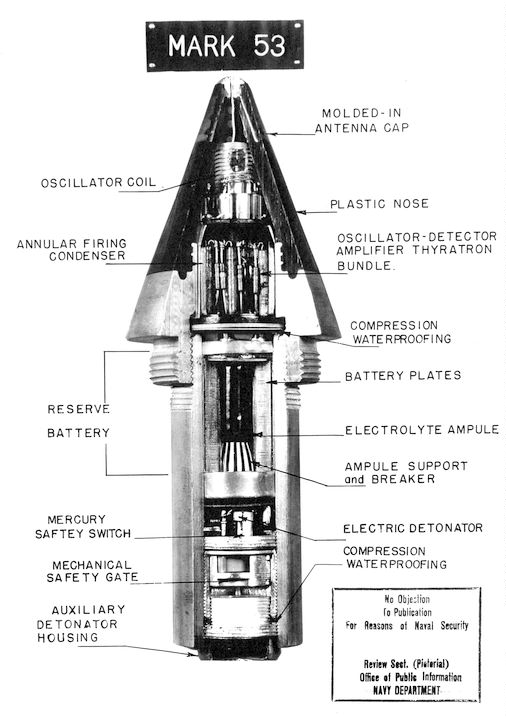
Cut away diagram of the proximity fuze Mark 53

In August 1940, the NDRC began work on a proximity fuze, a fuze inside an artillery shell that would explode when it came close to its target. A radar set, along with the batteries to power it, was miniaturized to fit inside a shell, and its glass vacuum tubes designed to withstand the 20,000 g-force of being fired from a gun and 500 rotations per second in flight. Unlike normal radar, the proximity fuze sent out a continuous signal rather than short pulses. The NDRC created a special Section T chaired by Merle Tuve of the CIW, with Commander William S. Parsons as special assistant to Bush and liaison between the NDRC and the Navy's Bureau of Ordnance (BuOrd). One of CIW staff members that Tuve recruited to Section T in 1940 was James Van Allen. In April 1942, Bush placed Section T directly under the OSRD, and Parsons in charge. The research effort remained under Tuve but moved to the Johns Hopkins University's Applied Physics Laboratory (APL), where Parsons was BuOrd's representative. In August 1942, a live firing test was conducted with the newly commissioned cruiser USS Cleveland; three pilotless drones were shot down in succession.

To preserve the secret of the proximity fuze, its use was initially permitted only over water, where a dud round could not fall into enemy hands. In late 1943, the Army obtained permission to use the weapon over land. The proximity fuze proved particularly effective against the V-1 flying bomb over England, and later Antwerp, in 1944. A version was also developed for use with howitzers against ground targets. Bush met with the Joint Chiefs of Staff in October 1944 to press for its use, arguing that the Germans would be unable to copy and produce it before the war was over. Eventually, the Joint Chiefs agreed to allow its employment from December 25. In response to the German Ardennes Offensive on December 16, 1944, the immediate use of the proximity fuze was authorized, and it went into action with deadly effect. By the end of 1944, proximity fuzes were coming off the production lines at the rate of 40,000 per day. "If one looks at the proximity fuze program as a whole," historian James Phinney Baxter III wrote, "the magnitude and complexity of the effort rank it among the three or four most extraordinary scientific achievements of the war."

The German V-1 flying bomb demonstrated a serious omission in OSRD's portfolio: guided missiles. While the OSRD had some success developing unguided rockets, it had nothing comparable to the V-1, the V-2 or the Henschel Hs 293 air-to-ship gliding guided bomb. Although the United States trailed the Germans and Japanese in several areas, this represented an entire field that had been left to the enemy. Bush did not seek the advice of Robert H. Goddard. Goddard would come to be regarded as America's pioneer of rocketry, but many contemporaries regarded him as a crank. Before the war, Bush had gone on the record as saying, "I don't understand how a serious scientist or engineer can play around with rockets", but in May 1944, he was forced to travel to London to warn General Dwight Eisenhower of the danger posed by the V-1 and V-2. Bush could only recommend that the launch sites be bombed, which was done.

==== Manhattan Project ====
Bush played a critical role in persuading the United States government to undertake a crash program to create an atomic bomb. When the NDRC was formed, the Committee on Uranium was placed under it, reporting directly to Bush as the Uranium Committee. Bush reorganized the committee, strengthening its scientific component by adding Tuve, George B. Pegram, Jesse W. Beams, Ross Gunn and Harold Urey. When the OSRD was formed in June 1941, the Uranium Committee was again placed directly under Bush. For security reasons, its name was changed to the Section S-1.

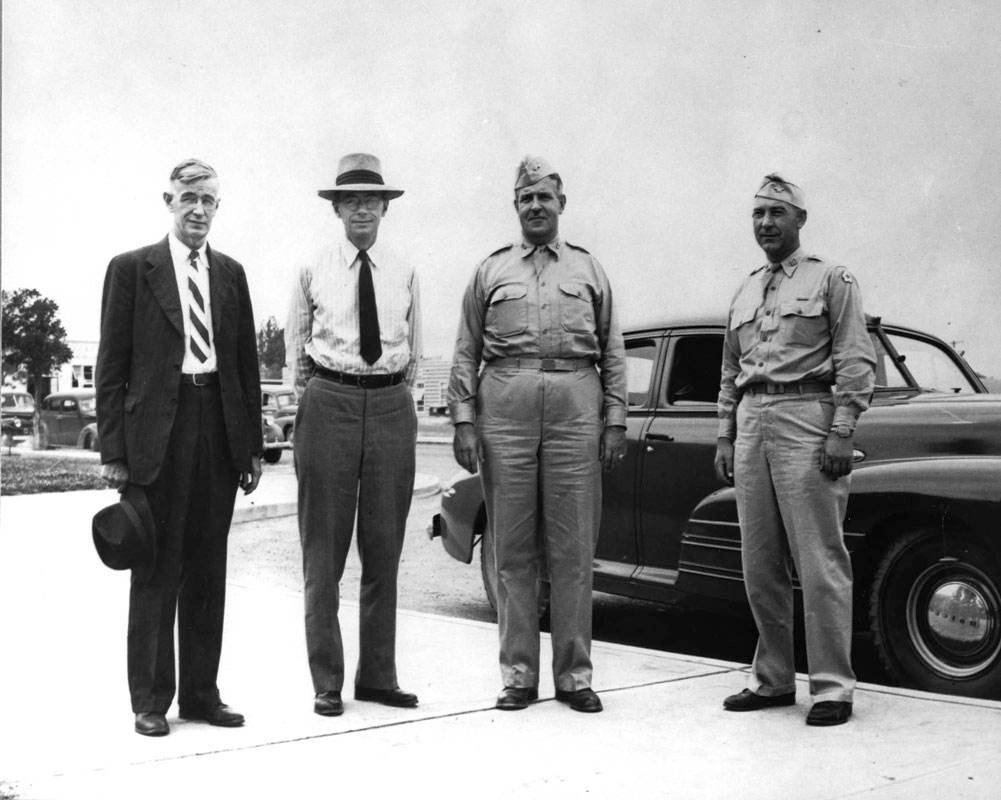
Left to right: Vannevar Bush, James B. Conant, Major General Leslie Groves and Colonel Franklin Matthias at the Hanford Site in July 1945

Bush met with Roosevelt and Vice President Henry A. Wallace on October 9, 1941, to discuss the project. He briefed Roosevelt on Tube Alloys, the British atomic bomb project and its Maud Committee, which had concluded that an atomic bomb was feasible, and on the German nuclear energy project, about which little was known. Roosevelt approved and expedited the atomic program. To control it, he created a Top Policy Group consisting of himself—although he never attended a meeting—Wallace, Bush, Conant, Stimson and the Chief of Staff of the Army, General George Marshall. On Bush's advice, Roosevelt chose the army to run the project rather than the navy, although the navy had shown far more interest in the field, and was already conducting research into atomic energy for powering ships. Bush's negative experiences with the Navy had convinced him that it would not listen to his advice, and could not handle large-scale construction projects.

In March 1942, Bush sent a report to Roosevelt outlining work by Robert Oppenheimer on the nuclear cross section of uranium-235. Oppenheimer's calculations, which Bush had George Kistiakowsky check, estimated that the critical mass of a sphere of Uranium-235 was in the range of 2.5 to 5 kilograms, with a destructive power of around 2,000 tons of TNT. Moreover, it appeared that plutonium might be even more fissile. After conferring with Brigadier General Lucius D. Clay about the construction requirements, Bush drew up a submission for $85 million in fiscal year 1943 for four pilot plants, which he forwarded to Roosevelt on June 17, 1942. With the Army on board, Bush moved to streamline oversight of the project by the OSRD, replacing the Section S-1 with a new S-1 Executive Committee.

A week later, on June 23, President Roosevelt sent this one-sentence memo back to Bush: "Do you have the money?"

Bush soon became dissatisfied with the dilatory way the project was run, with its indecisiveness over the selection of sites for the pilot plants. He was particularly disturbed at the allocation of an AA-3 priority, which would delay completion of the pilot plants by three months. Bush complained about these problems to Bundy and Under Secretary of War Robert P. Patterson. Major General Brehon B. Somervell, the commander of the army's Services of Supply, appointed Brigadier General Leslie R. Groves as project director in September. Within days of taking over, Groves approved the proposed site at Oak Ridge, Tennessee, and obtained a AAA priority. At a meeting in Stimson's office on September 23 attended by Bundy, Bush, Conant, Groves, Marshall Somervell and Stimson, Bush put forward his proposal for steering the project by a small committee answerable to the Top Policy Group. The meeting agreed with Bush, and created a Military Policy Committee chaired by him, with Somervell's chief of staff, Brigadier General Wilhelm D. Styer, representing the army, and Rear Admiral William R. Purnell representing the navy.

At the meeting with Roosevelt on October 9, 1941, Bush advocated cooperating with the United Kingdom, and he began corresponding with his British counterpart, Sir John Anderson. But by October 1942, Conant and Bush agreed that a joint project would pose security risks and be more complicated to manage. Roosevelt approved a Military Policy Committee recommendation stating that information given to the British should be limited to technologies that they were actively working on and should not extend to post-war developments. In July 1943, on a visit to London to learn about British progress on antisubmarine technology, Bush, Stimson, and Bundy met with Anderson, Lord Cherwell, and Winston Churchill at 10 Downing Street. At the meeting, Churchill forcefully pressed for a renewal of interchange, while Bush defended existing policy. Only when he returned to Washington did he discover that Roosevelt had agreed with the British. The Quebec Agreement merged the two atomic bomb projects, creating the Combined Policy Committee with Stimson, Bush and Conant as United States representatives.

Bush appeared on the cover of Time magazine on April 3, 1944. He toured the Western Front in October 1944, and spoke to ordnance officers, but no senior commander would meet with him. He was able to meet with Samuel Goudsmit and other members of the Alsos Mission, who assured him that there was no danger from the German project; he conveyed this assessment to Lieutenant General Bedell Smith. In May 1945, Bush became part of the Interim Committee formed to advise the new president, Harry S. Truman, on nuclear weapons. It advised that the atomic bomb should be used against an industrial target in Japan as soon as possible and without warning. Bush was present at the Alamogordo Bombing and Gunnery Range on July 16, 1945, for the Trinity nuclear test, the first detonation of an atomic bomb. Afterwards, he took his hat off to Oppenheimer in tribute.

Before the end of the Second World War, Bush and Conant had foreseen and sought to avoid a possible nuclear arms race. Bush proposed international scientific openness and information sharing as a method of self-regulation for the scientific community, to prevent any one political group gaining a scientific advantage. Before nuclear research became public knowledge, Bush used the development of biological weapons as a model for the discussion of similar issues, an "opening wedge". He was less successful in promoting his ideas in peacetime with President Harry Truman, than he had been under wartime conditions with Roosevelt.

In "As We May Think", an essay published by the Atlantic Monthly in July 1945, Bush wrote: "This has not been a scientist's war; it has been a war in which all have had a part. The scientists, burying their old professional competition in the demand of a common cause, have shared greatly and learned much. It has been exhilarating to work in effective partnership."

== Post-war years ==
=== Memex concept ===
Bush introduced the concept of the memex during the 1930s, which he imagined as a form of memory augmentation involving a microfilm-based "device in which an individual stores all his books, records, and communications, and which is mechanized so that it may be consulted with exceeding speed and flexibility. It is an enlarged intimate supplement to his memory." He wanted the memex to emulate the way the brain links data by association rather than by indexes and traditional, hierarchical storage paradigms, and be easily accessed as "a future device for individual use ... a sort of mechanized private file and library" in the shape of a desk. The memex was also intended as a tool to study the brain itself. The structure of memex is considered a precursor to the World Wide Web.

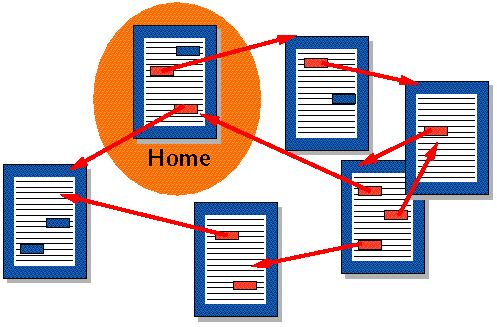
Bush conceived the encyclopedia of the future as having a mesh of associative trails running through it, akin to hyperlinks, stored in a memex system.

After thinking about the potential of augmented memory for several years, Bush set out his thoughts at length in "As We May Think", predicting that "wholly new forms of encyclopedias will appear, ready made with a mesh of associative trails running through them, ready to be dropped into the memex and there amplified". "As We May Think" was published in the July 1945 issue of The Atlantic. A few months later, Life magazine published a condensed version of "As We May Think", accompanied by several illustrations showing the possible appearance of a memex machine and its companion devices.

Shortly after "As We May Think" was originally published, Douglas Engelbart read it, and with Bush's visions in mind, commenced work that would later lead to the invention of the mouse. Ted Nelson, who coined the terms "hypertext" and "hypermedia", was also greatly influenced by Bush's essay.

"As We May Think" has turned out to be a visionary and influential essay. In their introduction to a paper discussing information literacy as a discipline, Bill Johnston and Sheila Webber wrote in 2005 that:

Bush's paper might be regarded as describing a microcosm of the information society, with the boundaries tightly drawn by the interests and experiences of a major scientist of the time, rather than the more open knowledge spaces of the 21st century. Bush provides a core vision of the importance of information to industrial / scientific society, using the image of an "information explosion" arising from the unprecedented demands on scientific production and technological application of World War II. He outlines a version of information science as a key discipline within the practice of scientific and technical knowledge domains. His view encompasses the problems of information overload and the need to devise efficient mechanisms to control and channel information for use.

Bush was concerned that information overload might inhibit the research efforts of scientists. Looking to the future, he predicted a time when "there is a growing mountain of research. But there is increased evidence that we are being bogged down today as specialization extends. The investigator is staggered by the findings and conclusions of thousands of other workers."

=== National Science Foundation ===
The OSRD continued to function actively until some time after the end of hostilities, but by 1946–1947 it had been reduced to a minimal staff charged with finishing work remaining from the war period; Bush was calling for its closure even before the war had ended. During the war, the OSRD had issued contracts as it had seen fit, with just eight organizations accounting for half of its spending. MIT was the largest to receive funds, with its obvious ties to Bush and his close associates. Efforts to obtain legislation exempting the OSRD from the usual government conflict of interest regulations failed, leaving Bush and other OSRD principals open to prosecution. Bush therefore pressed for OSRD to be wound up as soon as possible.

With its dissolution, Bush and others had hoped that an equivalent peacetime government research and development agency would replace the OSRD. Bush felt that basic research was important to national survival for both military and commercial reasons, requiring continued government support for science and technology; technical superiority could be a deterrent to future enemy aggression. In Science, The Endless Frontier, a July 1945 report to the president, Bush maintained that basic research was "the pacemaker of technological progress". "New products and new processes do not appear full-grown," Bush wrote in the report. "They are founded on new principles and new conceptions, which in turn are painstakingly developed by research in the purest realms of science!" In Bush's view, the "purest realms" were the physical and medical sciences; he did not propose funding the social sciences. In Science, The Endless Frontier, science historian Daniel Kevles later wrote, Bush "insisted upon the principle of Federal patronage for the advancement of knowledge in the United States, a departure that came to govern Federal science policy after World War II."

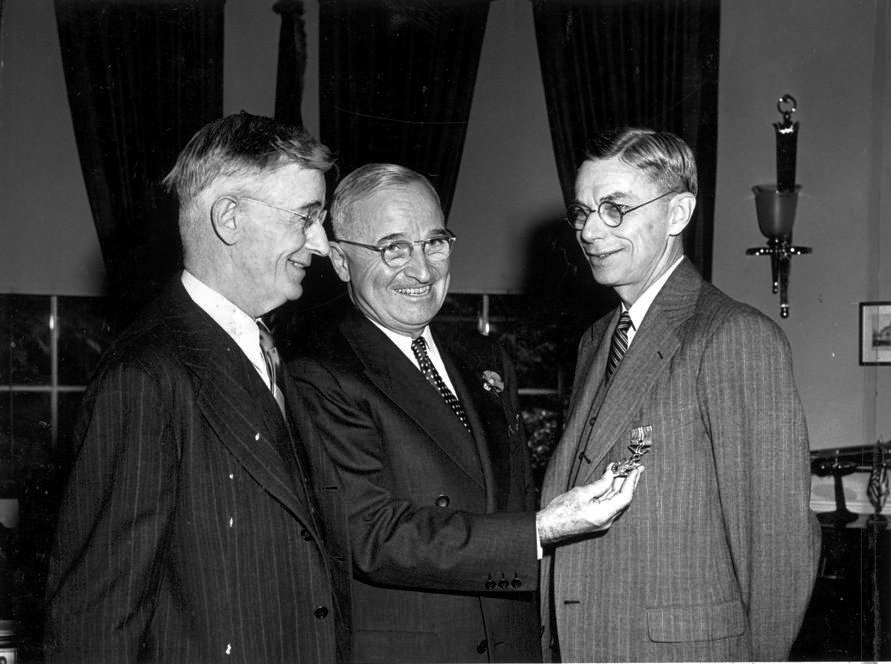
Bush (left) with Harry S. Truman (center) and James B. Conant (right)

In July 1945, the Kilgore bill was introduced in Congress, proposing the appointment and removal of a single science administrator by the president, with emphasis on applied research, and a patent clause favoring a government monopoly. In contrast, the competing Magnuson bill was similar to Bush's proposal to vest control in a panel of top scientists and civilian administrators with the executive director appointed by them. The Magnuson bill emphasized basic research and protected private patent rights. A compromise Kilgore–Magnuson bill of February 1946 passed the Senate but expired in the House because Bush favored a competing bill that was a virtual duplicate of Magnuson's original bill. A Senate bill was introduced in February 1947 to create the National Science Foundation (NSF) to replace the OSRD. This bill favored most of the features advocated by Bush, including the controversial administration by an autonomous scientific board. The bill passed the Senate and the House, but was pocket vetoed by Truman on August 6, on the grounds that the administrative officers were not properly responsible to either the president or Congress. The OSRD was abolished without a successor organization on December 31, 1947.

Without a National Science Foundation, the military stepped in, with the Office of Naval Research (ONR) filling the gap. The war had accustomed many scientists to working without the budgetary constraints imposed by pre-war universities. Bush helped create the Joint Research and Development Board (JRDB) of the Army and Navy, of which he was chairman. With passage of the National Security Act on July 26, 1947, the JRDB became the Research and Development Board (RDB). Its role was to promote research through the military until a bill creating the National Science Foundation finally became law. By 1953, the Department of Defense was spending $1.6 billion a year on research; physicists were spending 70 percent of their time on defense related research, and 98 percent of the money spent on physics came from either the Department of Defense or the Atomic Energy Commission (AEC), which took over from the Manhattan Project on January 1, 1947. Legislation to create the National Science Foundation finally passed through Congress and was signed into law by Truman in 1950.

The authority that Bush had as chairman of the RDB was much different from the power and influence he enjoyed as director of OSRD and would have enjoyed in the agency he had hoped would be independent of the Executive branch and Congress. He was never happy with the position and resigned as chairman of the RDB after a year, but remained on the oversight committee. He continued to be skeptical about rockets and missiles, writing in his 1949 book, Modern Arms and Free Men, that intercontinental ballistic missiles would not be technically feasible "for a long time to come ... if ever".

=== Panels and boards ===
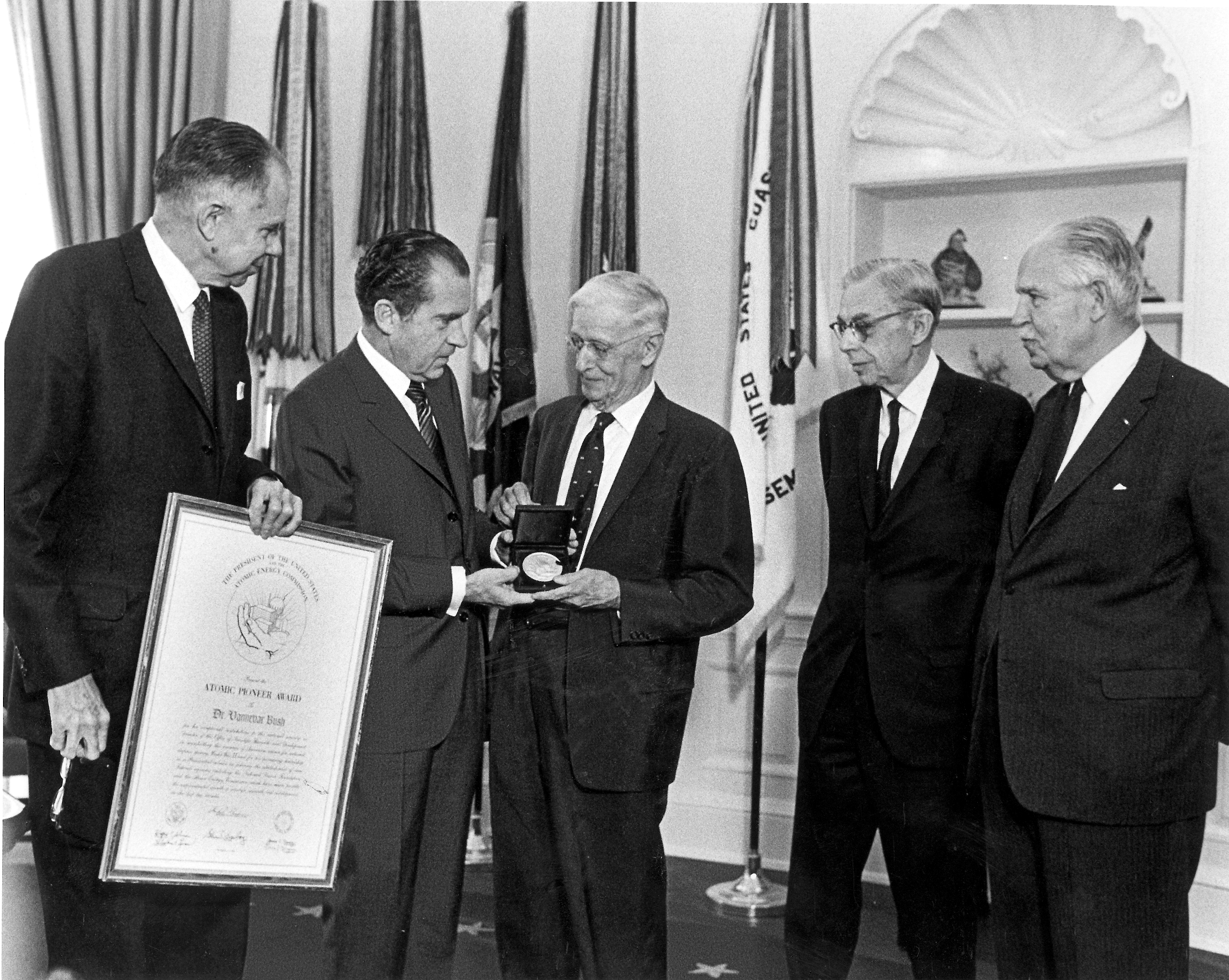
From left to right in a November 1969 photo, Glenn Seaborg, President Richard Nixon, and the three awardees of the Atomic Pioneers Award: Vannevar Bush, James B. Conant, and Gen. Leslie Groves.

With Truman as president, men like John R. Steelman, who was appointed chairman of the President's Scientific Research Board in October 1946, came to prominence. Bush's authority, both among scientists and politicians, suffered a rapid decline, though he remained a revered figure. In September 1949, he was appointed to head a scientific panel that included Oppenheimer to review the evidence that the Soviet Union had tested its first atomic bomb. The panel concluded that it had, and this finding was relayed to Truman, who made the public announcement. During 1952 Bush was one of five members of the State Department Panel of Consultants on Disarmament, and led the panel in urging that the United States postpone its planned first test of the hydrogen bomb and seek a test ban with the Soviet Union, on the grounds that avoiding a test might forestall development of a catastrophic new weapon and open the way for new arms agreements between the two nations. The panel lacked political allies in Washington, however, and the Ivy Mike shot went ahead as scheduled. Bush was outraged when a security hearing stripped Oppenheimer of his security clearance in 1954; he issued a strident attack on Oppenheimer's accusers in The New York Times. Alfred Friendly summed up the feeling of many scientists in declaring that Bush had become "the Grand Old Man of American science".

Bush continued to serve on the NACA through 1948 and expressed annoyance with aircraft companies for delaying development of a turbojet engine because of the huge expense of research and development as well as retooling from older piston engines. He was similarly disappointed with the automobile industry, which showed no interest in his proposals for more fuel-efficient engines. General Motors told him that "even if it were a better engine, [General Motors] would not be interested in it." Bush likewise deplored trends in advertising. "Madison Avenue believes", he said, "that if you tell the public something absurd, but do it enough times, the public will ultimately register it in its stock of accepted verities."

From 1947 to 1962, Bush was on the board of directors for American Telephone and Telegraph. He retired as president of the Carnegie Institution and returned to Massachusetts in 1955, but remained a director of Metals and Controls Corporation from 1952 to 1959, and of Merck & Co. 1949–1962. Bush became chairman of the board at Merck following the death of George W. Merck, serving until 1962. He worked closely with the company's president, Max Tishler, although Bush was concerned about Tishler's reluctance to delegate responsibility. Bush distrusted the company's sales organization, but supported Tishler's research and development efforts. He was a trustee of Tufts College 1943–1962, of Johns Hopkins University 1943–1955, of the Carnegie Corporation of New York 1939–1950, the Carnegie Institution of Washington 1958–1974, and the George Putnam Fund of Boston 1956–1972, and was a regent of the Smithsonian Institution 1943–1955.

== Final years and death ==
After suffering a stroke, Bush died in Belmont, Massachusetts, at the age of 84 from pneumonia on June 28, 1974. He was survived by his sons Richard (a surgeon) and John (president of Millipore Corporation) and by six grandchildren and his sister Edith. Bush's wife had died in 1969. He was buried at South Dennis Cemetery in South Dennis, Massachusetts, after a private funeral service. At a public memorial subsequently held by MIT, Jerome Wiesner declared "No American has had greater influence in the growth of science and technology than Vannevar Bush".

== Awards and honors ==
- Bush was elected to the American Academy of Arts and Sciences in 1925.
- Bush was elected to the United States National Academy of Sciences in 1934.
- Bush was elected to the American Philosophical Society in 1937.
- Bush received the AIEE's Edison Medal in 1943, "for his contribution to the advancement of electrical engineering, particularly through the development of new applications of mathematics to engineering problems, and for his eminent service to the nation in guiding the war research program."
- In 1945, Bush was awarded the Public Welfare Medal from the National Academy of Sciences.
- In 1949, he received the IRI Medal from the Industrial Research Institute in recognition of his contributions as a leader of research and development.
- President Truman awarded Bush the Medal of Merit with bronze oak leaf cluster in 1948.
- President Lyndon Johnson awarded him the National Medal of Science in 1963.
- President Richard Nixon presented him, as well as James B. Conant and General Leslie R. Groves with the unique Atomic Pioneers Award from the Atomic Energy Commission in February 1970.
- Bush was made a Knight Commander of the Order of the British Empire in 1948, and an Officer of the French Legion of Honor in 1955.

In 1980, the National Science Foundation created the Vannevar Bush Award to honor his contributions to public service. The Vannevar Bush papers are located in several places, with the majority of the collection held at the Library of Congress. Additional papers are held by the MIT Institute Archives and Special Collections, the Carnegie Institution, and the National Archives and Records Administration. In 2019, national security intelligence company Vannevar Labs was founded, and named after Bush. As of 2023, the Vannevar Bush Distinguished Professor is Michael Levin, an American developmental and synthetic biologist at Tufts University.

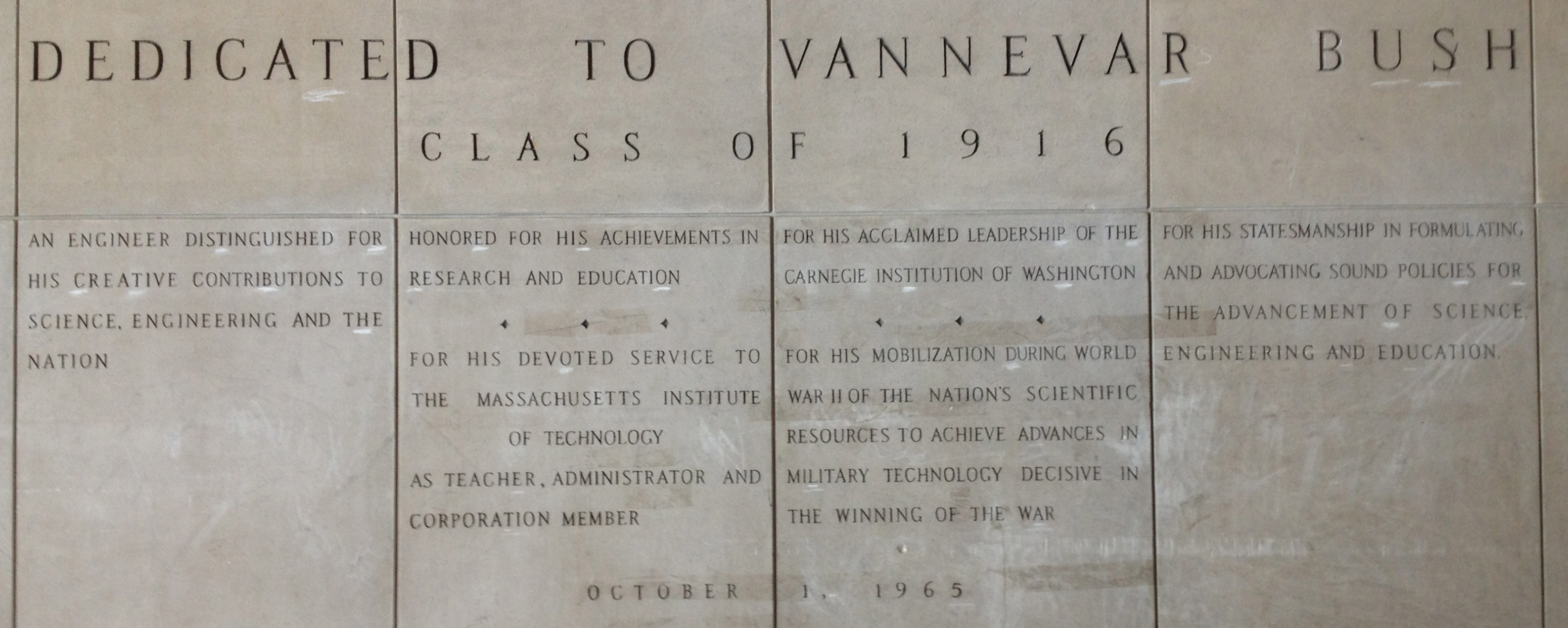
This inscription honoring Vannevar Bush is in the lobby of MIT's Building 13, which is named after him, and is the home of the Center for Materials Science and Engineering.

== In popular culture ==
In the 1947 film The Beginning or the End, Bush is played by Jonathan Hale.

Bush is played by Matthew Modine in Christopher Nolan's 2023 film Oppenheimer.

== See also ==
- List of pioneers in computer science

== Bibliography ==
(complete list of published papers: Wiesner 1979, pp. 107–117).

- Bush, Vannevar; Timbie, William H. (1922). Principles of Electrical Engineering. John Wiley & Sons – via Internet Archive.
- Bush, Vannevar; Wiener, Norbert (1929). Operational Circuit Analysis. New York: J. Wiley & Sons. OCLC 2167931.
- Bush, Vannevar (1945). Science, the Endless Frontier: a Report to the President (PDF). Washington, D.C.: U.S. Government Printing Office. OCLC 1594001.
- Bush, Vannevar (1946). Endless Horizons. Washington, D.C.: Public Affairs Press. OCLC 1152058.
- Bush, Vannevar (1949). Modern Arms and Free Men: a Discussion of the Role of Science in Preserving Democracy. New York: Simon and Schuster. OCLC 568075.
- Bush, Vannevar (1967). Science Is Not Enough. New York: Morrow. OCLC 520108.
- Bush, Vannevar (1970). Pieces of the Action. New York: Morrow. OCLC 93366.

== Notes ==
Government offices
Preceded by Joseph Ames	Chairman of the National Advisory Committee for Aeronautics; 1939–1941	Succeeded by Jerome Hunsaker
New office	Chairman of the National Defense Research Committee; 1940–1941	Succeeded by James B. Conant
New office	Director of the Office of Scientific Research and Development; 1941–1947	Vacant Title next held by Oliver Buckley; 1951 as Chair of the Science Advisory Committee
New office	Chairman of the Research and Development Board; 1947–1948	Succeeded by Karl Compton
