= Oliver Ellsworth Buckley =

American electrical engineer (1887–1959)

Oliver E. Buckley
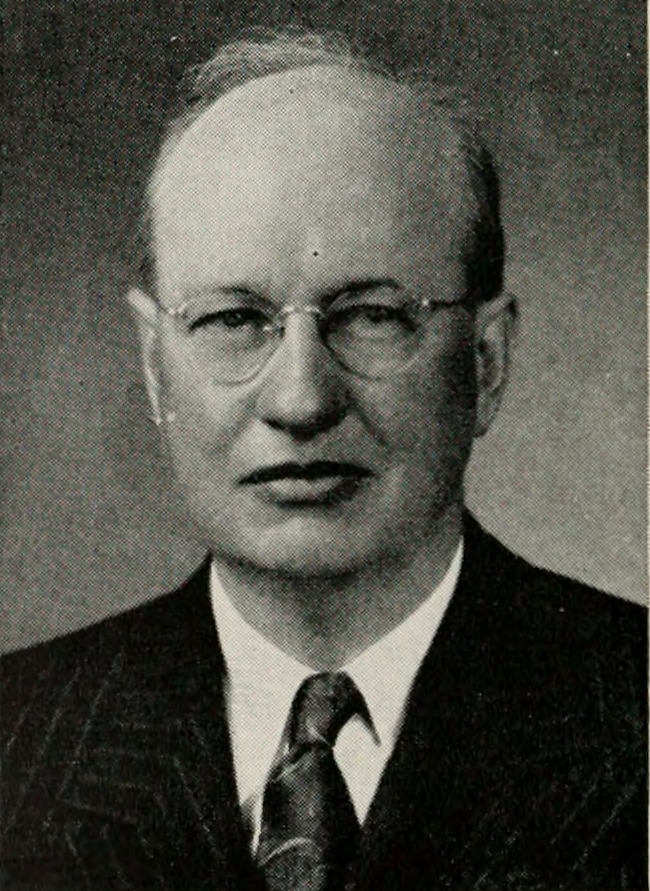

Chairman of the President's Science Advisory Committee
- In office April 20, 1951 – June 15, 1952
- President: Harry S. Truman
- Preceded by: Vannevar Bush (Office of Scientific Research and Development, 1947)
- Succeeded by: Lee Alvin DuBridge

Personal details
- Born: August 8, 1887 Sloan, Iowa, U.S.
- Died: December 14, 1959 (aged 72) Newark, New Jersey, U.S.
- Education: Grinnell College (BS); Cornell University (MS, PhD)
- Awards: IEEE Edison Medal (1954)

Oliver Ellsworth Buckley (August 8, 1887 – December 14, 1959) was an American electrical engineer known for his contributions to the field of submarine telephony.

== Biography ==
Buckley was an undergraduate at Grinnell College until 1909. He joined the Bell System after completing his PhD in physics at Cornell University in 1914. In 1915, Buckley, along with AT&T coworkers H. D. Arnold and Gustav Elmen, developed a method of substantially improving the transmission performance of submarine communications cable so that transmission speed of over 2000 letters per minute were achieved. They constructed the cable by wrapping the copper conductors with annealed permalloy tape, a material that Elmen had discovered, thus inductively loading the cable.

Buckley was elected to the United States National Academy of Sciences in 1937, the American Philosophical Society in 1942, and the American Academy of Arts and Sciences in 1949.

Buckley was the president of Bell Labs from 1940 to 1951, and chairman of the board from 1951 until his retirement in 1952.

Buckley was a member of the General Advisory Committee of the United States Atomic Energy Commission from 1948 to 1954. In that role, Buckley opposed the 1950 decision to proceed with the development of the hydrogen bomb, but by 1952 had changed his view and supported the program.

Buckley received the IEEE Edison Medal for "contributions to the science and art which have made possible a transatlantic telephone cable; for wise leadership of a great industrial laboratory; for outstanding services to the government of his country". The Oliver E. Buckley Condensed Matter Prize is named in his honor.

Government offices
Vacant Title last held by Vannevar Bush; 1947 as Director of the Office of Scientific Research and Development	Chairman of the President's Science Advisory Committee; 1951–1952	Succeeded by Lee Alvin DuBridge
