= Herbert York =

American nuclear physicist (1921–2009)

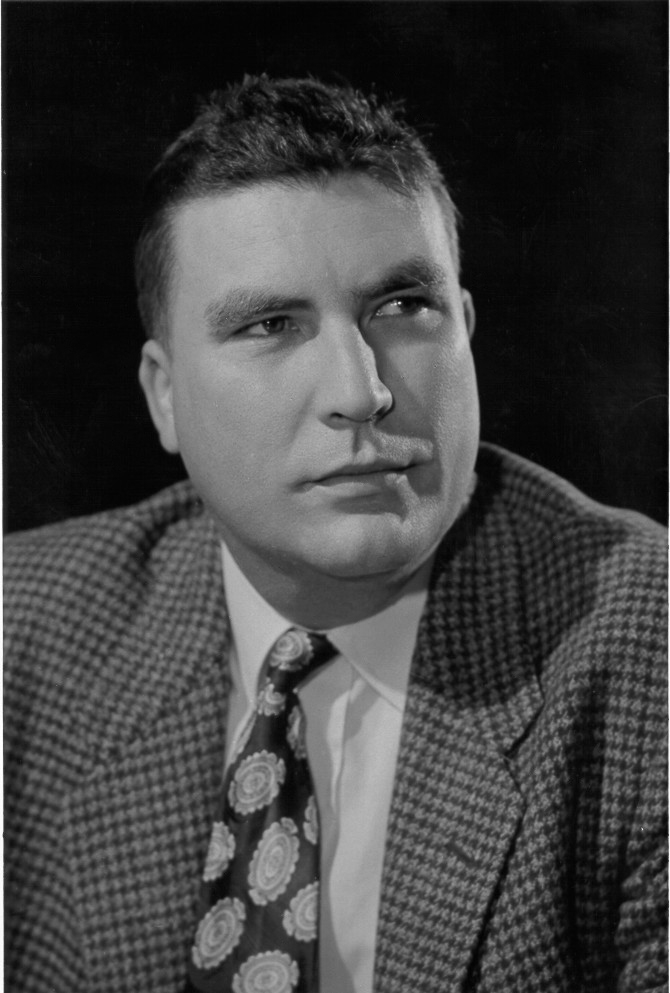
- Herbert F. York in 1957
- Born: 24 November 1921; Rochester, New York, USA
- Died: 19 May 2009 (aged 87); San Diego, California
- Education: University of Rochester (B.S., M.S.) (1943); University of California, Berkeley (Ph.D) (1949)
- Awards: E. O. Lawrence Award (1962); Enrico Fermi Award (2000); Vannevar Bush Award (2000); Clark Kerr Medal (2000)
- Scientific career
- Fields: Nuclear Physics
- Workplaces: University of California Radiation Laboratory; Manhattan Project; Lawrence Livermore National Laboratory; University of California, Berkeley; University of California San Diego; Advanced Research Projects Agency (DARPA); Defense Department Research and Engineering (DDR&E)

Herbert Frank York (24 November 1921 – 19 May 2009) was an American nuclear physicist of Mohawk origin. He held numerous research and administrative positions at various United States government and educational institutes.

== Biography ==
Herbert York was born to a family of Mohawk ancestry, in Rochester, New York. He received his B.S. and M.S. degrees from the University of Rochester in 1943, and then went on to obtain his Ph.D. from the University of California, Berkeley in 1949. His dissertation advisor was future Nobel laureate Emilio Segrè, and Robert Oppenheimer taught York's quantum mechanics class. During World War II, he was a physicist at the Berkeley Radiation Laboratory and at Oak Ridge National Laboratory, working alongside Frank Oppenheimer as part of the Manhattan Project. After a brief stint as an assistant professor of physics at his doctoral alma mater in 1951, he was selected by Ernest Lawrence to serve as the inaugural director of the University of California Radiation Laboratory, Livermore Branch (1952–1958).

Upon leaving Livermore, he held important positions in government for the remainder of the Eisenhower administration, becoming the first chief scientist of the Advanced Research Projects Agency and the first director of Defense Research and Engineering. During this period, he "gradually became concerned that the United States and the Soviet Union were developing more weapons yet becoming less secure and that the shortened response times to a pre-emptive nuclear strike would put nuclear decision making in the hands of low-level military officers or, ultimately, computers," according to William J. Broad of The New York Times, prompting his lifelong advocacy as a member of the anti-nuclear movement.

He was the founding chancellor of the University of California, San Diego (1961–1964), where he remained on the physics faculty for the rest of his career, later serving as the institution's acting chancellor (1970–1972) amid the search for William J. McGill's successor. An advisor to the Arms Control and Disarmament Agency in the 1960s, he returned to government service in earnest as the U.S. delegate to the Comprehensive Test Ban negotiations in Geneva, Switzerland (1979–1981); as part of this role, he was the chief U.S. negotiator in the unsuccessful effort to impose a comprehensive U.S.-Soviet nuclear test ban.

York was director emeritus of the Institute on Global Conflict and Cooperation at UC San Diego and served as chairman of the university's Scientific and Academic Advisory Committee, which oversees activities at both Livermore and Los Alamos National Laboratories. He also served on the board of the Council for a Livable World, a nonpartisan arms control organization in Washington, D.C. York occasionally guest lectured for UC San Diego and other institutions.

York died 19 May 2009 in San Diego at age 87.

== Publications ==
- Race to Oblivion (Simon & Schuster, 1970)
- Arms Control (Readings from Scientific American) (W.H. Freeman, 1973)
- The Advisors: Oppenheimer, Teller and the Superbomb (W.H. Freeman, 1976), a book that Hans Bethe regarded as containing a highly accurate treatment of the "Russian H-bomb" test of 1953.
- Race to Oblivion (Simon & Schuster, 1978)
- Making Weapons, Talking Peace: A Physicist's Journey from Hiroshima to Geneva (Harper & Row, 1987)
- A Shield in Space? Technology, Politics and the Strategic Defense Initiative (U.C. Press, 1988, with Sanford Lakoff)
- Arms and the Physicist (American Physical Society, 1994)

Government offices
Preceded by Paul D. Foote	Director of Defense Research and Engineering; 1958 – 1961	Succeeded by Harold Brown
Academic offices
Preceded by Position created	Chancellor of the University of California San Diego; 1961–1964, 1970–1972	Succeeded by John Semple Galbraith
Preceded by William J. McGill	Chancellor of the University of California San Diego; 1961–1964, 1970–1972	Succeeded by William D. McElroy
