= Guyford Stever =

American physicist, educator, and engineer (1916–2010)

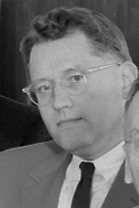

1st Director of the Office of Science and Technology Policy
- In office August 9, 1976 – January 20, 1977
- President: Gerald Ford
- Preceded by: Ed David (Science and Technology, 1973)
- Succeeded by: Frank Press

4th Director of the National Science Foundation
- In office 1972–1976
- President: Richard Nixon; Gerald Ford
- Preceded by: William D. McElroy
- Succeeded by: Richard C. Atkinson

5th President of Carnegie Mellon University
- In office 1965–1972
- Preceded by: John Warner
- Succeeded by: Richard Cyert

Personal details
- Born: Horton Guyford Stever; October 24, 1916 Corning, New York, U.S.
- Died: April 9, 2010 (aged 93) Gaithersburg, Maryland, U.S.
- Education: Colgate University (BS); California Institute of Technology (MS, PhD)
- Scientific career
- Fields: Physics
- Workplaces: Massachusetts Institute of Technology
- Thesis: 1. The discharge mechanism of Geiger counters. 2. The mean lifetime of the mesotron from electroscope data (1941)
- Doctoral advisor: Victor Neher

Horton Guyford Stever (October 24, 1916 – April 9, 2010) was an American administrator, physicist, educator, and engineer. He was a director of the National Science Foundation (from February 1972 to August 1976).

== Biography ==
Stever was raised in Corning, New York, principally by his maternal grandmother. He played football in high school. He graduated from Colgate University with an undergraduate degree in physics and then from California Institute of Technology in 1941 with a PhD in physics. He joined the staff of the radiation lab at MIT. In 1942 he began serving the military as a civilian scientific liaison officer based in London, England until the end of World War II. After D-Day he was sent to France several times to study German technology.

He returned to MIT after the war, serving as associate dean of engineering there from 1956 to 1959 and then as a department head. In 1965 he became the fifth President of Carnegie Mellon University (and the first under that name, in 1967), a position he held until 1972. Stever House, a dorm on Carnegie Mellon's campus, is named for him. During this period, he was also chairman of the aeronautics and space engineering board for the National Academy of Engineering advising NASA and other Federal agencies.

He also served as the director of the National Science Foundation from 1972 until 1976. Between 1976 and 1977 he was President Gerald Ford's Science Advisor.

He also served on the board of trustees of Science Service, now known as Society for Science & the Public, from 1982 to 2006.

Stever received an LL.D. from Bates College in 1977. In 1997, he received the Vannevar Bush Award from the National Science Board.

Stever died at his home in Gaithersburg, Maryland on April 9, 2010.

=== NACA Special Committee on Space Technology ===
Guyford Stever was chairman or member of numerous advisory committees to the U.S. government. The NACA's Special Committee on Space Technology, also called the "Stever Committee," was among the better-known of these. It was a special steering committee that was formed with the mandate to coordinate various branches of the Federal government, private companies as well as universities within the United States with NACA's objectives and also harness their expertise in order to develop a space program.

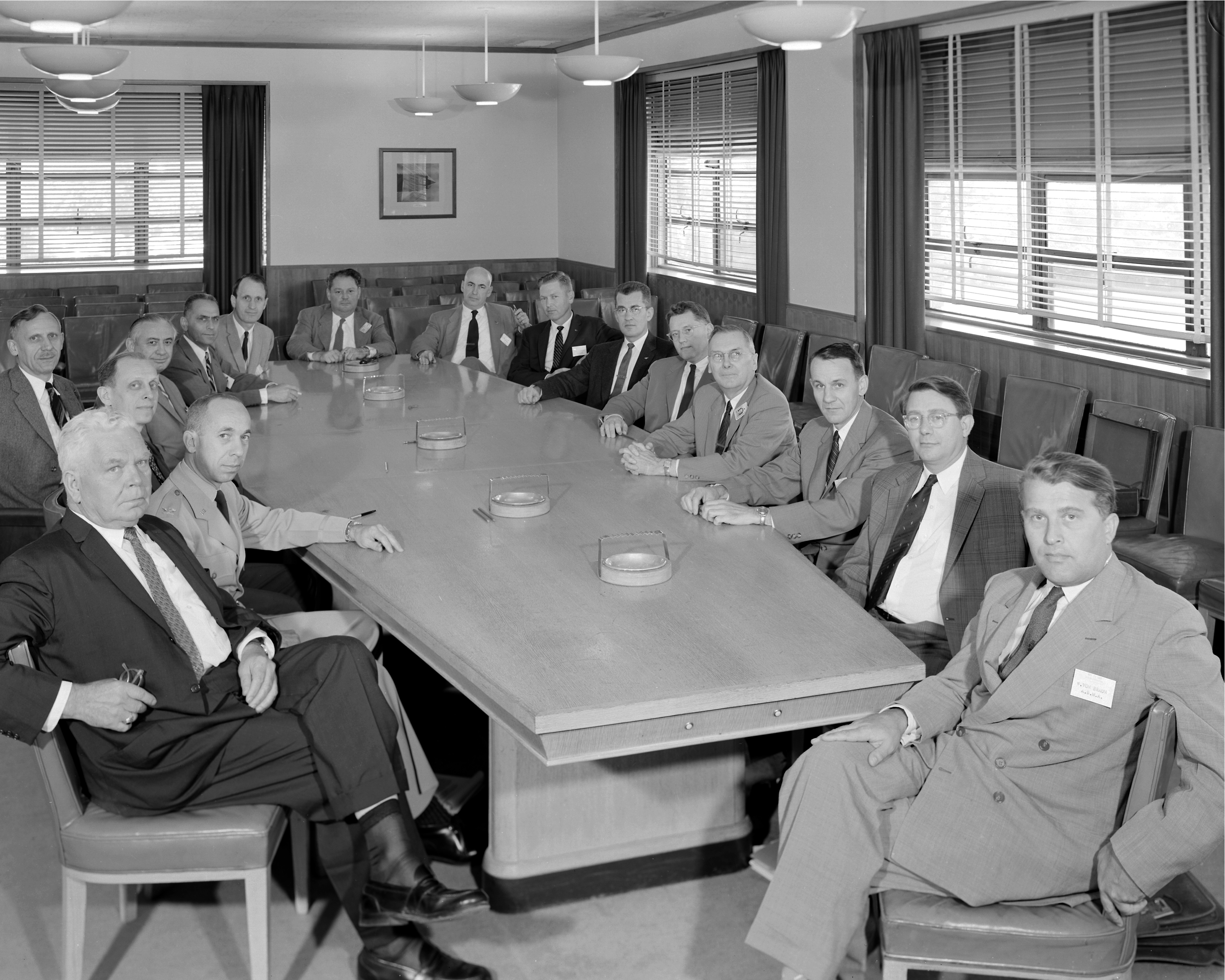
NACA's Special Committee on Space Technology in their May 26, 1958 meeting. At the head of the table: Wernher von Braun. Dr. Stever is fourth to his right. Hendrik Wade Bode is fourth from the left.

Remarkably, Hendrik Wade Bode, the man who helped develop the robot weapons that brought down the Nazi V-1 flying bombs over London during WWII, was actually serving on the same committee and sitting at the same table as the chief engineer of the V-2, the other weapon that terrorised London: Wernher von Braun.

As of their meeting on May 26, 1958, committee members, starting clockwise from the left of the adjacent picture, included:

Committee member	Title
Ray Sharp	Director of the Lewis Flight Propulsion Laboratory
Colonel Norman C Appold	Assistant to the Deputy Commander for Weapons Systems, Air Research and Development Command: US Air Force
Abraham Hyatt	Research and Analysis Officer Bureau of Aeronautics, Department of the Navy
Hendrik Wade Bode	Director of Research Physical Sciences, Bell Telephone Laboratories
William Randolph Lovelace II	Chairman, Lovelace Foundation for Medication Education and Research
S. K Hoffman	General Manager, Rocketdyne Division, North American Aviation
Milton U Clauser	Director, Aeronautical Research Laboratory, The Ramo-Wooldridge Corporation
H. Julian Allen	Chief, High Speed Flight Research, NACA Ames
Robert R. Gilruth	Assistant Director, NACA Langley
J. R. Dempsey	Manager. Convair-Astronautics (Division of General Dynamics)
Carl B. Palmer	Secretary to Committee, NACA Headquarters
H. Guyford Stever	Chairman, Associate Dean of Engineering, Massachusetts Institute of Technology
Hugh L. Dryden	(ex officio), Director, NACA
Dale R. Corson	Department of Physics, Cornell University
Abe Silverstein	Associate Director, NACA Lewis
Wernher von Braun	Director, Development Operations Division, Army Ballistic Missile Agency

=== NRC Committee on Human Exploration of Space ===
In 1990 Stever chaired a Committee on Human Exploration of Space for the National Research Council. The committee released a report titled, Human Exploration of Space: A Review of NASA's 90-Day Study and Alternatives.

== Honors ==
- Elected to the American Academy of Arts and Sciences, 1953.
- Elected to the American Philosophical Society, 2001.

== Footnotes ==
Academic offices
Preceded by John Warner	President of Carnegie Mellon University; 1965–1972	Succeeded by Richard Cyert
Government offices
Preceded by William D. McElroy	Director of the National Science Foundation; 1972–1976	Succeeded by Richard C. Atkinson
Vacant Title last held by Ed David; 1973 as Director of the Office of Science and Technology	Director of the Office of Science and Technology Policy; 1976–1977	Succeeded by Frank Press
