= Neal Francis Lane =

American physicist (born 1938)

Neal Lane
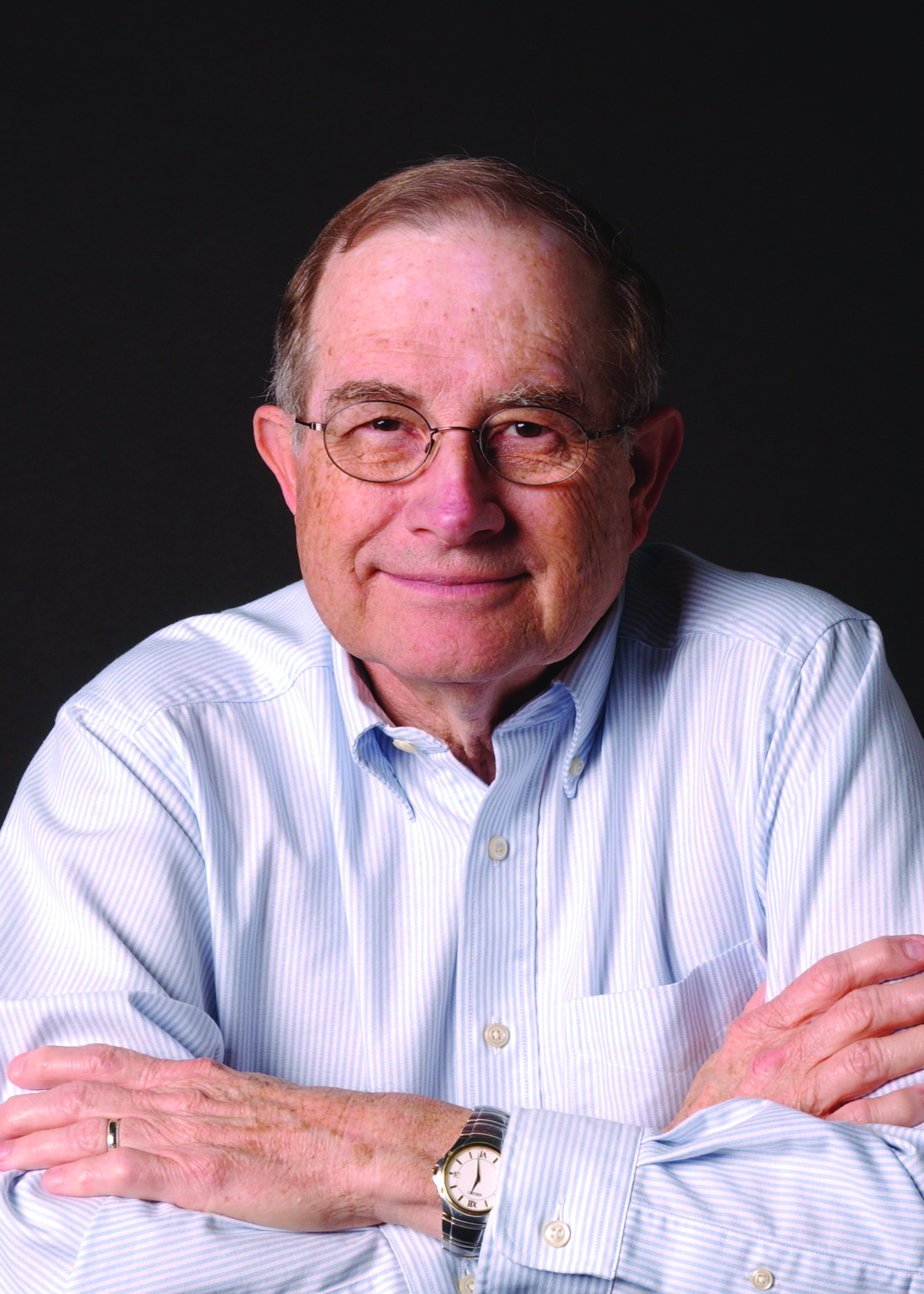
- Lane in 2001

7th Director of the Office of Science and Technology Policy
- In office August 4, 1998 – January 20, 2001
- President: Bill Clinton
- Preceded by: Kerri-Ann Jones (Acting)
- Succeeded by: Rosina Bierbaum (Acting)

10th Director of the National Science Foundation
- In office January 20, 1993 – December 13, 1998
- President: Bill Clinton
- Preceded by: Walter Massey
- Succeeded by: Rita Colwell

3rd Chancellor of the University of Colorado, Colorado Springs
- In office July 24, 1984 – May 14, 1986
- Preceded by: Donald Schwartz
- Succeeded by: Dwayne Nuzum

Personal details
- Born: Cornelius Francis Lane; August 22, 1938 (age 87) Oklahoma City, Oklahoma, U.S.
- Spouse: Joni Sue Williams (m. 1960)
- Children: 2
- Education: University of Oklahoma (BS, MS, PhD)
- Scientific career
- Fields: Theoretical physics Atomic physics Molecular physics
- Institutions: Rice University; National Science Foundation; University of Colorado, Colorado Springs
- Thesis: A study of certain inelastic electron-atom collision processes (1965)
- Doctoral advisor: Chun Chia Lin
- Other academic advisors: Alexander Dalgarno

Cornelius Francis "Neal" Lane (born August 22, 1938), is an American physicist and senior fellow in science and technology policy at Rice University's Baker Institute for Public Policy and Malcolm Gillis University Professor Emeritus of Physics and Astronomy Emeritus at Rice University in Houston, Texas.

He has served as chancellor of the University of Colorado at Colorado Springs, provost of Rice University, and Science Advisor to the President (Assistant to the President for Science and Technology and director of the Office of Science and Technology Policy (OSTP) during the Bill Clinton Administration). Lane lectures and writes on matters of science and technology policy.

== Early life ==
Lane was born in Oklahoma City in 1938, graduated from Southeast High School, and earned his B.S., M.S., and Ph.D. in physics from the University of Oklahoma. His thesis advisor was Chun Chia Lin.

== Career ==
=== Research, teaching and administration ===
Initially pursuing a career in teaching and research, Lane carried out post-doctoral studies in the Department of Applied Mathematics at Queen's University Belfast in Belfast, Northern Ireland, studying with Professor Alexander Dalgarno, and as a visiting fellow at the Joint Institute for Laboratory Astrophysics (currently JILA), working with Dr. Sydney Geltman. He joined Rice University as an assistant professor in 1966 and was promoted to full professor of physics, space physics, and astronomy in 1972. His research contributions were all in the area of theoretical, atomic, and molecular physics, with an emphasis on electronic and atomic collision phenomena.

On leave from Rice for the academic year 1979–1980, Lane served as director of the Division of Physics at the National Science Foundation (NSF). In 1984 he became chancellor of the University of Colorado at Colorado Springs, which was developing new graduate programs in science and engineering in response to the growing technology industry in the Pikes Peak region. Returning to Rice as provost in 1986, Lane served in this role until 1993, when he joined the Bill Clinton Administration as director of the NSF and ex officio member of the National Science Board.

=== National Science Foundation ===
As Director of the NSF from 1993–1998, Lane focused on preserving the agency's emphasis on supporting fundamental research in all fields of science, mathematics and engineering. During Lane's tenure, the NSF was required to develop a formal long-range strategic plan in accordance with the Government Performance and Results Act (GPRA) of 1993. The NSF plan avoided prescriptive quantitative metrics and retained a discipline-based organization focused on funding excellent basic research, with expert peer review evaluation as the main criterion for success. On the programmatic side, the agency realigned and re-competed the NSF Supercomputer Centers, in response to rapid changes in scientific computing, and the NSF Science and Technology Centers. NSF also established the CAREER program for young investigators and began implementation of the first federal agency electronic system for proposal submission and review. During Lane's tenure, the NSF created the major research equipment budget line, which supported several construction projects, including the Laser Interferometer Gravitational Wave Observatory (LIGO), the first GEMINI telescope, and the new Amundsen-Scott South Pole Research Station, part of the U.S. Antarctic Program. In response to employee needs, NSF established the first child-development center for its personnel. In April 1998, at one of Lane's last Congressional hearings as NSF Director, when asked to speculate on the future, he said: "If I were asked for an area of science and engineering that will most likely produce the breakthroughs of tomorrow I would point to nanoscale science and engineering, often called simply 'nanotechnology'."

=== White House Office of Science and Technology Policy ===
In August 1998, Lane was appointed President Bill Clinton's science advisor, a dual position as assistant to the president for science and technology and director of the White House OSTP, the latter requiring Senate confirmation. As assistant to the president for science and technology, Lane also served as the federal co-chair of the President's Committee on Science and Technology (PCAST). As science advisor to President Clinton, Lane worked to promote the administration's science and technology initiatives and, specifically, championed the advancement of basic scientific research in the U.S. During Lane's tenure, the White House OSTP dealt with policies related to stem cell research, food safety, missile defense, climate change, the U.S. space program. (e.g., launch of the first elements of the International Space Station), and the Human Genome Project, (e.g., release of the first draft sequence of the human genome), the National Nanotechnology Initiative, and international cooperation in science and technology.

=== Current work ===
Serving until the end of the Clinton administration, Lane returned to Rice in 2001 as the institution's first university professor, also serving as professor of physics and astronomy and senior fellow of Rice University's Baker Institute for Public Policy. He retired from his faculty positions as Malcolm Gillis University Professor and professor of physics and astronomy on January 1, 2015.

Lane continues to serves as senior fellow in science and technology policy at Rice University's Baker Institute for Public Policy and co-director of the Baker Institute's Science and Technology Policy Program alongside Dr. Kirstin R.W. Matthews. The Baker Institute is a top-ranked university-affiliated nonpartisan public policy think tank with research programs in energy policy; health policy; tax and expenditure policy; Latin America, Mexico, Middle East, and China studies; drug policy; international economics; politics and elections; religion policy; space policy; and science and technology policy. The Science and Technology Policy Program aims to develop an active dialogue between scientists and citizens; to propose funding allocations for scientific and biomedical research, environmental policy, and science diplomacy; and to instruct on scientific public policy endeavors. Lane has worked with Matthews on numerous projects, including the International Stem Cell Policy Initiative and the Civic Scientist Initiative.

Lane continues to lecture, provide Congressional testimony, meet with students, scholars and leaders in education, business and public policy. He also serves on non-profit boards and advisory committees that focus on science and technology, science and mathematics education, and federal policy. He co-chaired (with Norman Augustine, retired chairman and CEO of Lockheed Martin Corp.) a study of the American Academy of Arts and Sciences that led to the 2014 report "Restoring the Foundation – The Vital Role of Research in Preserving the American Dream. He serves on the Advisory Board of the Journal of Science Policy & Governance.

== Personal life ==
Neal Lane is married to Joni Sue (Williams) Lane. In 2015, they celebrated their 55th anniversary. They have two children, Christy Saydjari and John Lane, and four grandchildren, Allia and Alexander Saydjari, and Matthew and Jessica Lane.

== Awards ==
- Two-time recipient of George R. Brown Prize for Superior Teaching at Rice University (1973, 1976)
- Distinguished Service Award, National Association of Biology Teachers (1997)
- President's Award, American Society of Mechanical Engineers (1999)
- Public Service Award, American Chemical Society (1999)
- Support of Science Award, Council of Science Societies Presidents (2000)
- AAAS Philip Hauge Abelson Prize (1999)
- NASA Distinguished Service Award (2000)
- William D. Carey Lecture Award, American Association for the Advancement of Science (2001)
- Public Service Award, American Mathematical Society, American Astronomical Society, and American Physical Society (2001)
- Distinguished Alumni Award, University of Oklahoma (2002)
- K.T. Compton Medal for Leadership in Physics, American Institute of Physics (2009)
- National Academy of Sciences Public Welfare Medal (2009)
- Association of Rice Alumni Gold Medal (2009)
- Distinguished Friend of Science Award from the Southeastern Universities Research Association (2011)
- Vannevar Bush Award from NSF's National Science Board (2013)
- Lifetime Achievement Award from the University of Colorado at Colorado Springs (2016)

== Selected publications ==
- Neal Lane, "Benjamin Franklin, Civic Scientist", in Physics Today, vol. 56, no. 10, p 41 (October 2003)
- Lane, "U.S. Science and Technology – An Uncoordinated System That Seems to Work" in special issue "China, India and the United States," of the journal Technology in Society, vol. 30, Nos 3–4 August–November 2008, pp 248–263 (Elsevier, NY, and Science Direct, 2008)
- Neal Lane and Tom Kalil, "The National Nanotechnology Initiative: Present at the Creation", Issues in Science and Technology, XXI, Number 4 (Summer 2005), pp 49–54 (National Academies, Washington D.C.)
- Neal Lane, "Science in the seat of power," in Bulletin of the Atomic Scientists, issue July/August 2008, page 48.
- Neal Lane, "Essay: American Physics, Policy, and Politics: An Uneasy Relationship," Physical Review Letters, vol. 101, 31 December 2008, pp. 260001–260009. http://journals.aps.org/prl/edannounce/PhysRevLett.101.260001
- Neal Lane and George Abbey, "United States Space Policy: Challenges and Opportunities Gone Astray," American Academy of Arts and Sciences (occasional paper) (Cambridge, Mass., 2009).
- Neal Lane and Kirstin Matthews, "The President's Scientist" in Cell 139, pp 847–850 (Nov. 25, 2009)
- Kirstin R.W. Matthews, Neal Lane and Kenneth M. Evans, "U.S. Scientific Research and Development 202", in "Science Progress" (July 23, 2011, on-line) http://scienceprogress.org/2011/07/u-s-scientific-research-and-development-202/
- Neal Lane, "Science Policy Tools: Time for an Update", in Issues in Science and Engineering (National Academies Press, Fall 2011, pp 31–38) .http://www.issues.org/28.1/lane.html
- Neal Lane and Rahul Rekhi, "Qualitative Metrics in Science Policy: What Can't be Counted Counts," in Issues in Science and Engineering (National Academies Press, Fall 2012, pp 21–24) http://www.issues.org/29.1/rahul.html
- Norman Augustine and Neal Lane, "What if America had a Plan for Scientific Research?" Inside Sources, on-line –April 28, 2014
- A.A. Rosenberg, L.M. Branscomb, V. Eady, P.C. Frumhoff, G.T. Goldman, M. Halpern, K. Kimmell, Y. Kothari, L.D. Kramer, N.F. Lane, J.J. McCarthy, P. Phartiyal, K. Rest, R. Sims, and C. Wexler, "Congress's Attacks on Science-Based Rules: Proposed Laws Based on False Premises Could Undermine Science for the Public Interest," Science, pp 964–966, vol. 348, issue 6238, 2015.

Academic offices
Preceded by Donald Schwartz	Chancellor of the University of Colorado, Colorado Springs; 1984–1986	Succeeded by Dwayne Nuzum
Government offices
Preceded by Walter Massey	Director of the National Science Foundation; 1993–1998	Succeeded by Rita Colwell
Preceded by Kerri-Ann Jones; Acting	Director of the Office of Science and Technology Policy; 1998–2001	Succeeded by Rosina Bierbaum; Acting
