= Vivian Ho =

Vivian Ho may refer to:

- Vivian Ho (journalist), American journalist
- Vivian Ho (academic), professor and health economist
- Vivian Ho (artist), Hong Kong painter and illustrator
