= Mihail Roco =

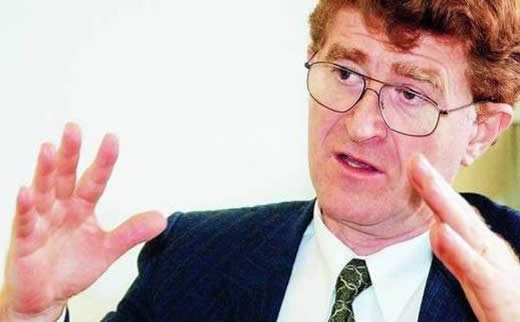
Mihail Roco

Mihail C. Roco is the founding chair of the US National Science and Technology Council subcommittee on Nanoscale Science, Engineering and Technology (NSET), and is Senior Advisor for Science and Engineering, including Nanotechnology, at the National Science Foundation. He is also the editor in chief of the Journal of Nanoparticle Research.

== Early career ==
Roco obtained a doctorate from the Polytechnic University of Bucharest (1976). He was Professor of Mechanical Engineering at the University of Kentucky (1981–1995), and held visiting professorships at the California Institute of Technology (1988–1989), Johns Hopkins University (1993–1995), Tohoku University (1989), and Delft University of Technology (1997–98).

He has played a leadership role in the National Nanotechnology Initiative, nanoscale science and engineering research and education, particulate and multiphase systems, and in developing perspectives on the societal implications of nanotechnology. He pioneered convergence science, identifying basic theories, principles and methods for convergence, and applied it to various platforms such as convergence of nanotechnology with bio-, cognition-, digital-, AI and other fields for various goals, in what is sometimes called converging and emerging technologies. Convergence research for universal processes in nature and society has become an international endeavor since 2001. He is credited with thirteen patents and has contributed over three hundred articles and twenty books on mass transfer, rotating machinery, multiphase systems, computer simulations, nanoparticles and nanosystems, intelligent cognitive assistants, trends in emerging technologies, knowledge convergence and societal implications. He is a co-founder and past Chair of the AIChE Particle Technology Forum.

Roco coordinated the preparation of the U.S. National Science and Technology Council reports on "Nanotechnology Research Directions" in 1999 and the "National Nanotechnology Initiative" in 2000. Under his stewardship the nanotechnology federal investment has increased from about $3 million in 1991 at NSF to $1.8 billion in 2010, and over 80 countries adopted nanotechnology programs using the vision formulated in these documents. The cumulative National Nanotechnology Initiative (NNI) investment in research and development is about $45 billion in 2025. NNI has been adopted as a research priority by six U.S. administrations between 2000 and 2025, with research programs in over twenty federal departments and independent agencies and all accredited S&E universities. Presidents Bill Clinton (“scientific breakthroughs that have changed the way we live and work” March 2024), Barack Obama (“shape the goals and strategies.. to ensure benefits of nanotechnology” December 2010) and Joe Biden (“inspired by the limitless possibilities…from green technologies to quantum computing… solving some of our Nation’s greatest challenges” March 2024) commended the impact of NNI through public recognition letters to NNI leadership, and President Joe Biden signed a personal congratulation letter to M.C. Roco (“I am grateful for your service to the American people…” July 2024). Nanotechnology has become a global science and technology initiative since 2000, the annual revenues from products where nanotechnology is a condition for competitiveness been estimated to about $3 trillion worldwide in 2020, of which about one-fourth is in the U.S.

Roco is Member of the European Academy of Sciences and Arts, Member of the Swiss Academy of Engineering Sciences, and Honorary Member of the Romanian Academy. He is Fellow of the American Society of Mechanical Engineers, Fellow of the Institute of Physics, Fellow of the American Institute of Chemical Engineers, and Fellow of the International Association of Advanced Materials. Roco served as associate editor for Journal of Fluids Engineering and for journal of Measurement Science and Technology.

== Awards ==
Forbes magazine recognized him in 2003 as the first among "Nanotechnology’s Power Brokers" and Scientific American named him one of 2004's top 50 Technology Leaders. He was declared "Engineer of the Year" in 1999 and 2004 by NSF and the U.S. National Society of Professional Engineers. Dr. Roco was Swiss Academy Annual Lecturer, "J. Robert Oppenheimer" LANL Lecturer, Smithsonian Institution Lecturer, UNESCO World Forum Lecturer, and The Brookings Institution Lecturer.

Dr. Roco is the 2005 recipient of the AIChE Forum Award "for leadership and service to the national science and engineering community through initiating and bringing to fruition the National Nanotechnology Initiative". He was named in 2016 “Eminent ASME FED engineer”. He was honored as recipient of the "Carl Duisberg Award" in Germany for computer simulations, "Burgers Award" in Netherlands for multiphase processes, "Semiconductor Research Association Award for Nanoelectronics", and "Outstanding Service and Vision for Sustainable Nanotechnology" award of the Sustainable Nanotechnology Organization. He received the National Materials Advancement Award from the U.S. Federation of Materials Societies in 2007 for NNI leadership and “as the individual most responsible for support and investment in nanotechnology by government, industry, and academia worldwide”. In 2011 he received the ChinaNANO Award from the Chinese Academy of Science. Dr. Roco received the inaugural award of the International Union of Materials Research Societies "Global Leadership and Service Award" in 2015 at the EU Parliament for "vision and dedicated leadership ...that has made major impact to all citizens around the world."
