= Ken Lewis (executive) =

Former CEO, president, and chairman of Bank of America

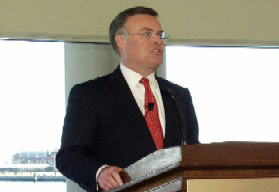
- Born: April 9, 1947 (age 79); Meridian, Mississippi, U.S.
- Education: Georgia State University (BA)
- Occupations: Former CEO, president, and chairman of Bank of America
- Spouse: Donna Lewis

Kenneth D. Lewis (born April 9, 1947) is the former CEO, president, and chairman of Bank of America, currently the second largest bank in the United States and twelfth largest by total assets in the world. While CEO of Bank of America, Lewis was noted for purchasing the failing companies Countrywide Financial and Merrill Lynch, resulting in large losses for the bank and necessitating financial assistance from the federal government. On September 30, 2009, Bank of America confirmed that Lewis would be retiring by the end of the year. Lewis was replaced by Brian Moynihan as president and CEO and Walter Massey as chairman of the board.

== Early life and career ==
Lewis grew up in Walnut Grove, Mississippi until age 5, then moved to Heidelberg, Germany. His father was in the Army. He is a graduate of Georgia State University, where he earned a Bachelor of Arts degree in finance from J. Mack Robinson College of Business.

Lewis joined North Carolina National Bank (NCNB) as a credit analyst in 1969, and was the head of both international and domestic operations when it became NationsBank, which would eventually become Bank of America.

== Chief Executive Officer ==
Lewis became CEO, president and chairman of Bank of America after the retirement of Hugh McColl in 2001. In November 2008, while still CEO, a time when the bank had had to borrow $86 billion from the Federal Reserve, Lewis wrote to shareholders saying that he was at the helm of "one of the strongest and most stable banks in the world".

=== Recognition ===
Lewis was named Banker of the Year in 2001, and was the same year honored as Top Chief Executive Officer, according to US Banker. In 2007, Lewis was listed among the 100 Most Influential People in the world by Time Magazine. He was again named Banker of the Year in 2008.

=== Salary ===
While CEO of Bank of America in 2007, Lewis earned total compensation of $20,404,009, which included an annual base salary of $1,500,000, a cash bonus of $4,250,000, stocks granted of $11,065,798, and options granted of $3,376,000. In 2008, he earned total compensation of $9,003,467, which included a base salary of $1,500,000, stocks granted of $4,255,012, and options granted of $2,973,330. In 2009, he earned total compensation of $32,171 accepting no salary, bonus, or stock options. To avoid a confrontation with Kenneth Feinberg, the U.S. Treasury's special master for compensation, Lewis decided to forgo a salary and bonus in 2009. Lewis has taken home $148.8 million from cash and stock sales since taking over the bank in 2001, according to Equilar, a compensation research firm. Lewis left Bank of America with more than $135 million in retirement benefits, including a pension and $10 million in life insurance benefits, according to an analysis of corporate filings by James F. Reda & Associates, an independent consulting firm.

=== Acquisition of Countrywide ===
On January 11, 2008, Lewis announced that Bank of America would buy Countrywide Financial for $4 billion, stating that it was a "rare opportunity" for the company. Bank of America would eventually complete the acquisition for $2.5 billion. The acquisition has since been characterized as "the worst deal in the history of American finance" with a total cost that may exceed $40 billion due to Countrywide's real estate losses, legal expenses and settlements with state and federal agencies. Losses related to the Countrywide acquisition have been so extensive that Bank of America had considered the option of placing its Countrywide division into bankruptcy in 2011.

=== Engineered takeover of Merrill Lynch ===
During the 2008 financial crisis, Lewis engineered the takeover of Merrill Lynch for $50 billion. The FDIC chairperson at the time, Sheila Bair, stated that the acquisition was overpriced, as Merrill Lynch along with Countrywide, which Bank of America also acquired, were "two of the sickest financial institutions in the country." Bair would further state that Bank of America had been healthy going into the 2008 financial crisis but would now be burdened by these ill-timed and overly generous acquisitions. In its January 16, 2009 earnings release, Bank of America revealed massive losses at Merrill Lynch in the fourth quarter, which required an infusion of $20 billion from the federal government. Merrill recorded an operating loss of $21.5 billion in the quarter.

On September 28, 2012, Bank of America announced that it agreed to pay $2.4 billion to settle an investor lawsuit over its Merrill Lynch acquisition.

=== Shareholder reorganization ===
On April 29, 2009, driven by anger over the Merrill Lynch acquisition, Bank of America shareholders narrowly voted to separate the positions of chairman of the board and CEO, effectively removing CEO Lewis from his position as chairman, though he remained both the bank's president and CEO. One-third of shareholders voted to remove Lewis from the board altogether.

=== Retirement ===
On September 30, 2009, Lewis announced his retirement effective as of December 31, 2009. Lewis released a statement saying "The Merrill Lynch and Countrywide integrations are on track and returning value already. Our board of directors and our senior management include more talent, and more diversity of talent, than at any time in this company's history. We are in position to begin to repay the federal government's TARP investments. For these reasons, I decided now is the time to begin to transition to the next generation of leadership at Bank of America."

Analysts cited the Countrywide acquisition further exacerbated by the Merrill Lynch acquisition, large credit losses at the bank's core operations, and the investment banking industry where Lewis was a novice as reasons why he stepped down.

Lewis' full pension benefits totaled $53 million. Critics of the financial sector's salary scale have cited this sum as indicative of poor oversight by the board of directors and as an example of inflated executive compensation. As Lewis' pension plan had already vested, he was entitled to full benefits. Bank of America has since put a freeze on supplemental executive retirement plans, citing the need to better align executive compensation with investor returns.

== Legacy ==
Bank of America has faced heavy losses from the Countrywide Financial and Merrill Lynch acquisitions made during Lewis' tenure. Following Lewis' retirement, the bank has divested more than $60 billion of assets to increase capital levels, settled with Fannie Mae for $11.7 billion to end disputes on bad home loans related to the Countrywide acquisition, settled for $2.4 billion on an investor lawsuit related to the Merrill Lynch acquisition, joined an $8.5 billion industry accord to compensate for abusive foreclosures, and has accrued nearly $50 billion in costs since 2007 for refunds and litigation related to defective Countrywide home loans and improper foreclosures. In 2011, Lewis's successor, Brian Moynihan, stated Bank of America will sell parts of the business to fill the crater that the Countrywide Financial acquisition left on its balance sheet. Moynihan has publicly criticized the acquisitions made under the leadership of Lewis stating "the Lewis-era binge left BofA with all kinds of pointless overhead" and further stated his intent to unwind many of these acquisitions.

Lewis has been named in several lawsuits since his retirement from Bank of America including a lawsuit filed by New York Attorney General Andrew Cuomo for defrauding investors and the government when buying Merrill Lynch. In March 2014, Lewis was banned for three years from serving as a public company official and ordered to pay $10 million for failing to disclose Merrill Lynch losses of $9 billion to investors prior to the takeover.

Warren Buffett is among the few public voices to offer a positive perspective of Lewis's legacy. Buffett regards Lewis as having played a crucial but unintended role in limiting the severity of the Great Recession, referring to him as the "ironic hero" of the 2008 economic meltdown. In his view, the acquisition prevented Merrill Lynch's imminent collapse, which would have greatly exacerbated the 2008 financial crisis: "If you think Lehman Brothers was bad, imagine Lehman compounded by Merrill Lynch," Buffett commented.

== Other roles ==
Lewis is a member of the Financial Services Roundtable and the Financial Services Forum; the Fifth District's representative on the Federal Advisory Committee; a member of the board and the executive committee and past chairman of United Way of Central Carolinas, Inc.; a member of the committee to Encourage Corporate Philanthropy; a director of the Homeownership Education and Counseling Institute; vice chairman of the Corporate Fund Board of The John F. Kennedy Center for the Performing Arts; and past chairman of the National Urban League.

Business positions
Preceded by Hugh McColl	Bank of America CEO; 2001-2009	Succeeded by Brian Moynihan
