= Michael Rout =

Michael P Rout
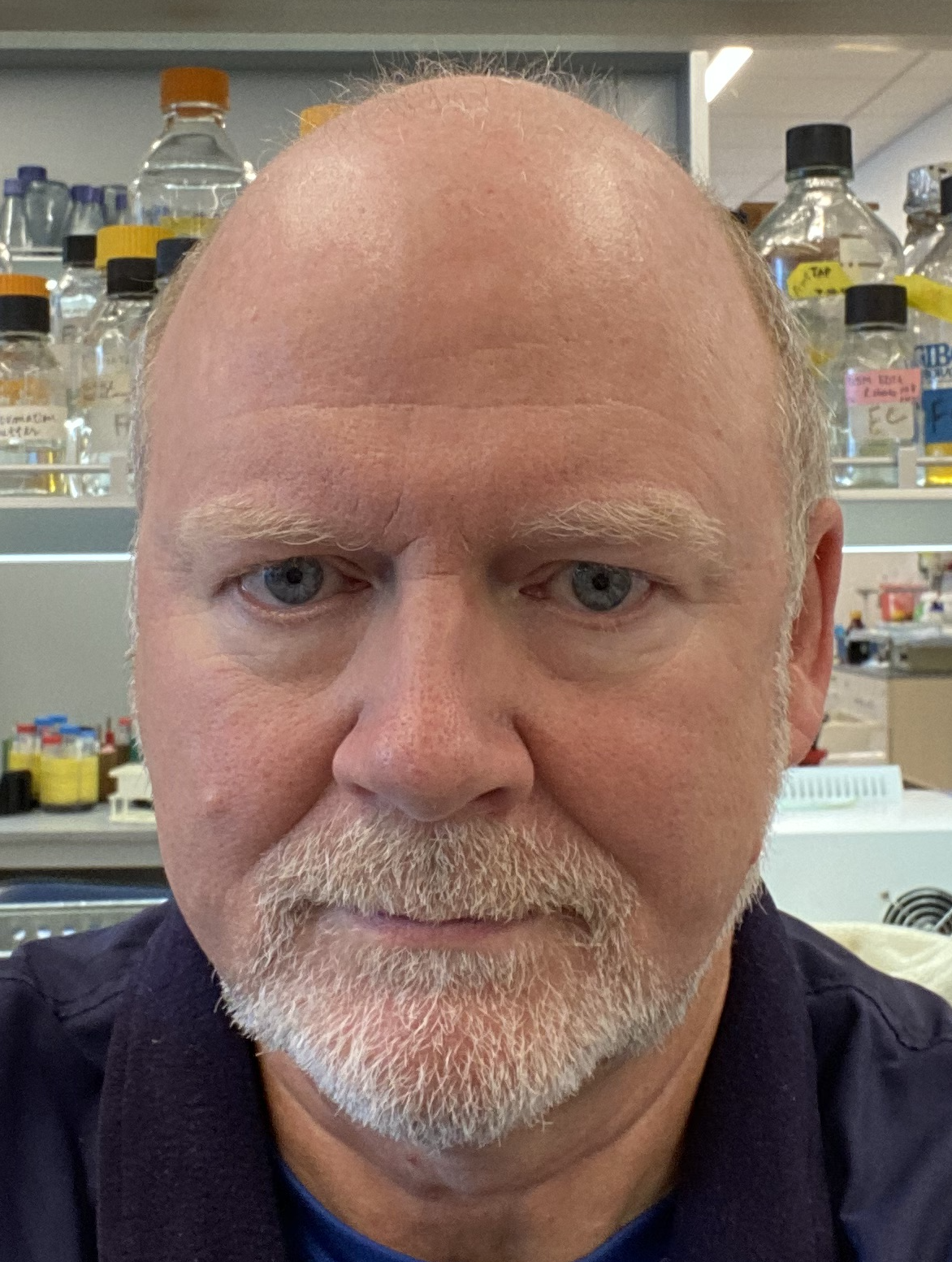
- Occupations: Molecular and cellular biologist
- Awards: Max Perutz Student Prize, MRC Laboratory of Molecular Biology (1989); Jane Coffin Childs Postdoctoral Fellowship,Jane Coffin Childs Memorial Fund for Medical Research (1990); Irma T. Hirschl Career Scientist Award, Icahn School of Medicine at Mount Sinai (1999); Rita Allen Foundation Scholarship, Rita Allen Foundation (2000); Presidential Early Career Award for Scientists and Engineers, National Science and Technology Council (2001)

Academic background
- Education: University of Cambridge
- Thesis: The Structure and Function of the Spindle Pole Body of the Yeast, Saccharomyces

Academic work
- Institutions: The Rockefeller University; National Center for Dynamic Interactome Research (NCDIR)

Michael P Rout is a molecular and cellular biologist. He is the George and Ruby deStevens Professor and Head of the Laboratory of Cellular and Structural Biology at The Rockefeller University, as well as the Director of the National Center for Dynamic Interactome Research (NCDIR).

Rout's research focuses on the assembly and interactions of protein complexes in cells and their disease-related alterations. His particular focus is on the nuclear pore complex (NPC); collectively, his work and that of his colleagues have rationalized the architecture, transport mechanisms, and evolutionary origins of the NPC, and have helped explain why defects in the NPC contribute to the etiology of several diseases. Expanding the scope of his research, he established the NCDIR with support from the National Institutes of Health (NIH). He has received several awards for his work including the Max Perutz Student Prize by MRC Laboratory of Molecular Biology in 1989, Irma T. Hirschl Career Scientist Award by Icahn School of Medicine at Mount Sinai in 1999, Rita Allen Foundation Scholarship by the Rita Allen Foundation in 2000, Presidential Early Career Award for Scientists and Engineers (PECASE) by the National Science and Technology Council (NSTC) in 2001, Distinguished Teaching Award by The Rockefeller University in 2018, and the Emerging Leader Award by Bay Area Lyme Foundation in 2021.

Rout has been part of the International Scientific Advisory Board of the Wellcome Trust Centre for Cell Biology in Edinburgh.

== Education ==
Rout graduated from the Peterhouse, University of Cambridge, where he pursued his undergraduate studies from 1983 to 1986, earning a B.A. (Hons) in Zoology, and then obtaining an M.A. (Hons) in Zoology. From 1986 to 1989, he worked under the supervision of J.V. Kilmartin at the MRC Laboratory of Molecular Biology in Cambridge completing his Ph.D. work on "The Structure and Function of the Spindle Pole Body of the Yeast, Saccharomyces".

== Career ==
After completing his PhD, Rout worked as a Scientific Officer at the MRC Laboratory of Molecular Biology in Cambridge from 1989 to 1990. He then conducted research as a Jane Coffin Childs Postdoctoral Fellow from 1990 to 1993 at The Rockefeller University with his supervisor Günter Blobel, focusing on the isolation and characterization of the yeast NPC.

Rout served as a Howard Hughes Medical Institute Research Associate, working on the characterization of the yeast NPC and nuclear envelope from 1993 to 1997. In 1997, he started independent laboratory at Rockefeller University as Assistant Professor and Head of the Laboratory of Cellular and Structural Biology, where he became Associate Professor by 2002 and Professor by 2008. In 2021, he was appointed the George and Ruby deStevens Professor at The Rockefeller University.

== Research ==
Rout's research has explored how nuclear pore complexes (NPCs) mediate the transport of molecules in and out of the nucleus, thereby controlling the communication of the cell's DNA with the rest of the cell and organizing the nucleus; defects in nuclear transport and NPC components and are implicated in numerous diseases. He examined the molecular architecture of the yeast NPC, the mechanism of its selective transport barrier, and shedding light on its evolutionary origins. In his related research on the integrative structure and functional anatomy of the NPC, he elucidated the complete architecture of the yeast NPC. This revealed its organizational framework, incorporating robust columns, flexible connector cables, and inwardly directed anchors crucial for RNA and protein transport. He also provided a comprehensive classification of the molecular components of the yeast NPC, mapping its architecture and suggesting a virtual gating mechanism for nucleocytoplasmic transport. Additionally, he worked on a method for determining the structures of macromolecular assemblies using proteomic data, demonstrated on the NPC, and suggested its applicability to other assemblies. He also looked into how the NPC, beyond regulating molecular traffic between the cytoplasm and nucleus, plays a crucial role in gene expression and the organization of nuclear architecture.

Rout's lab has also collaborated and developed interactomic technology, which maps and analyzes the dynamic macromolecular interactions in cells. He has collaborated to apply this technology to numerous disease models. Of note, he has helped develop pipelines to generate nanobodies, small robust single domain antibodies derived from camelids that can be targeted with high specificity against almost any antigen.

== Awards and honors ==
- 1989 – Max Perutz Student Prize, MRC Laboratory of Molecular Biology
- 1999 – Irma T. Hirschl Career Scientist Award, Icahn School Of Medicine At Mount Sinai
- 2000 – Rita Allen Foundation Scholarship, Rita Allen Foundation
- 2001 – Presidential Early Career Award for Scientists and Engineers (PECASE), National Science and Technology Council (NSTC)
- 2014 – Research Award, Jain Foundation
- 2018 – Distinguished Teaching Award, Rockefeller University
- 2021 – Emerging Leader Award, Bay Area Lyme Foundation

== Selected articles ==
- Rout, M. P., Aitchison, J. D., Suprapto, A., Hjertaas, K., Zhao, Y., & Chait, B. T. (2000). The yeast nuclear pore complex: composition, architecture, and transport mechanism. The Journal of cell biology, 148(4), 635–652.
- Devos, D., Dokudovskaya, S., Alber, F., Williams, R., Chait, B. T., Sali, A., & Rout, M. P. (2004). Components of coated vesicles and nuclear pore complexes share a common molecular architecture. PLoS biology, 2(12), e380.
- Alber, F., Dokudovskaya, S., Veenhoff, L. M., Zhang, W., Kipper, J., Devos, D., ... & Rout, M. P. (2007). The molecular architecture of the nuclear pore complex. Nature, 450(7170), 695–701.
- Kim, S. J., Fernandez-Martinez, J., Nudelman, I., Shi, Y., Zhang, W., Raveh, B., ... & Rout, M. P. (2018). Integrative structure and functional anatomy of a nuclear pore complex. Nature, 555(7697), 475–482.
- Akey, C. W., Singh, D., Ouch, C., Echeverria, I., Nudelman, I., Varberg, J. M., ... & Rout, M. P. (2022). Comprehensive structure and functional adaptations of the yeast nuclear pore complex. Cell, 185(2), 361–378.
