= NanoBusiness Commercialization Association =

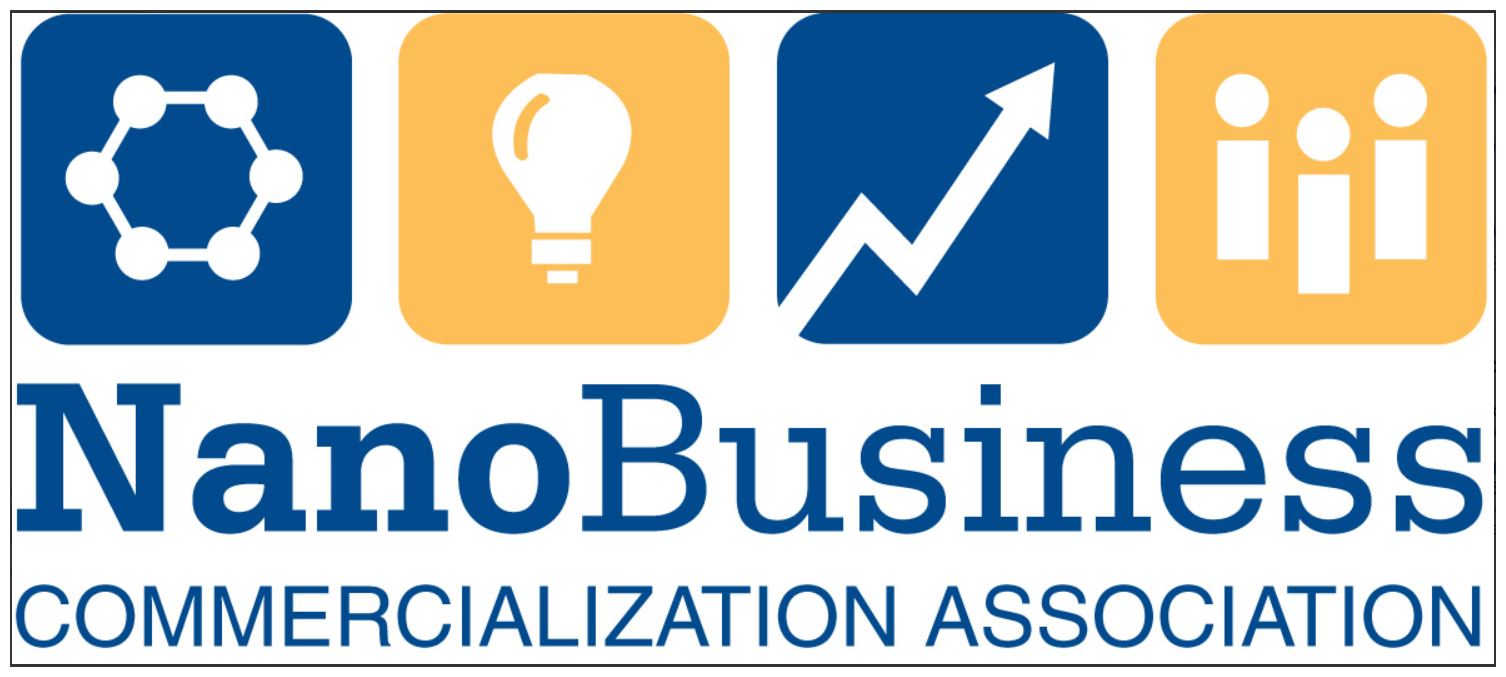
- Founded: November 2001
- Type: 501(c)(6) non-profit membership-based association
- Headquarters: Shelton, CT
- Field: Nanotechnology advocacy
- Members: 60
- Website: www.nanobca.org

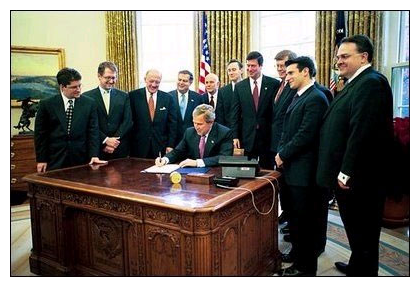
President Bush signing the 21st Century Nanotechnology Research and Development Act on December 3, 2003. In attendance at the signing were President Bush, Founders of NanoBCA, and NanoBCA Advisory Board Members.

The Nanobusiness Commercialization Association (NanoBCA) is a 501(c)(6) non-profit trade organization dedicated to creating a friendly political environment that nurtures research and innovation in nanotechnology, promotes tech-transfer of nanotechnologies from academia to industry, encourages private capital investments in nanotechnology companies, and helps its company members bringing nanotechnology products to the market. Founded in 2001, NanoBCA is the world's first non-profit association focused on the commercialization of nanotechnologies. Since its establishment, NanoBCA has been advocating for the continued allocation of significant funds per the National Nanotechnology Initiative (NNI). NanoBCA has advocated for Congress to ensure the continuous allocation of government funds to nanotechnology, such as basic research and SBIR grants.

== History ==
In November 2001, NanoBCA was founded by F. Mark Modzelewski, Nathan Tinker, Josh Wolfe, Vincent Caprio, and Griffith Kundahl – with the intention of boosting the advancements of nanotechnology from basic research to commercial products. Since 2001, the organization has been directed and managed by Mr. Vincent Caprio. In March 2011, the organization changed its name from NanoBusiness Alliance to NanoBusiness Commercialization Association.
