= Rosina Bierbaum =

American academic (born 1952)

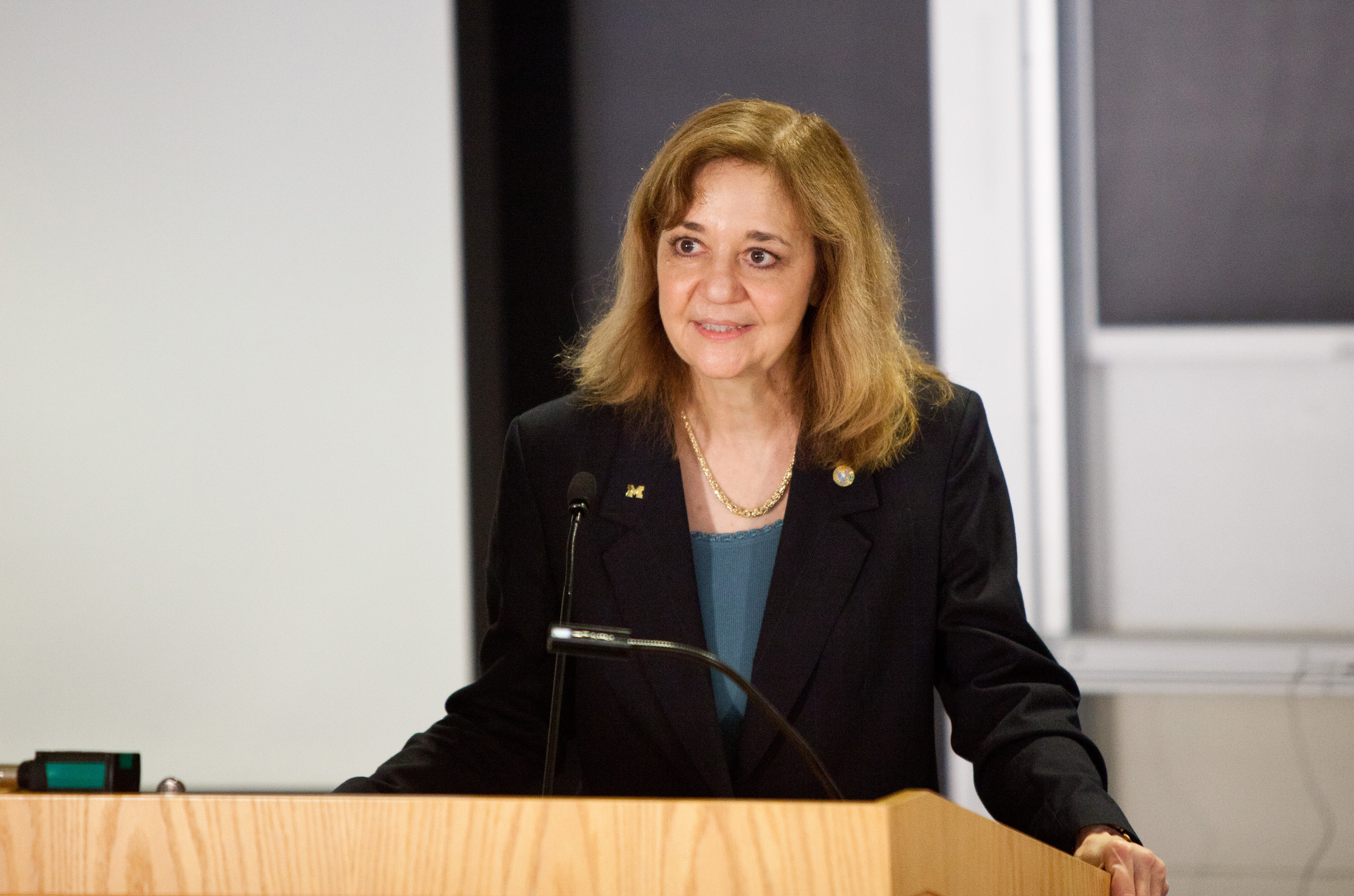

Director of the Office of Science and Technology Policy
- Acting
- In office January 21, 2001 – September 30, 2001
- President: George W. Bush
- Preceded by: Neal Lane
- Succeeded by: Clifford Gabriel (Acting)

Personal details
- Born: September 30, 1952 (age 74)
- Education: Boston College (BA, BS); Stony Brook University (MS, PhD)
- Scientific career
- Fields: Environmental science
- Workplaces: University of Michigan; Harvard University; University of Maryland, College Park
- Thesis: The physiological consequences of harboring a symbiont: the effect of Pea crabs (Pinnotheres maculatus) on mussels (Mytilus edulis) (1985)

Rosina M. Bierbaum (born September 30, 1952) is currently the Roy F. Westin Chair in Natural Economics and Research Professor at the University of Maryland's School of Public Policy. She is also a professor and former dean at the University of Michigan School of Natural Resources and Environment (SNRE). She was hired in October 2001 by then-University of Michigan president Lee Bollinger. She is also the former Chair of the Scientific and Technical Advisory Panel (STAP) that provides independent scientific and technical advice to the GEF (Global Environment Facility that serves as a financial mechanism for several environmental conventions) on its policies, strategies, programs, and projects.

== Prominent roles ==
=== Obama administration ===
In April 2009, President Obama named her to the United States President's Council of Advisors on Science and Technology (PCAST). PCAST consists of 20 scientists and engineers. Its members advise the President and Vice President to help the administration formulate policy in the many areas where understanding of science, technology and innovation is key to forming policy.

=== International agencies ===
In April 2008, the World Bank Group named Bierbaum to co-author and co-direct its World Development Report 2010: Development and Climate Change. The report focused on climate change and development. The report was released in October 2009. Her co-author was Marianne Fay.

She also serves as the U.S. Scientific Expert, Permanent Court of Arbitration of Disputes Relating to Natural Resources and/or the Environment, in the Hague.

=== Clinton administration ===
She worked closely with President Clinton's National Science and Technology Council and co-chaired the council's Committee on Environmental and Natural Resources, which coordinated the $5 billion federal research and development efforts in this area, including the (then) $2 billion U.S. Global Change Research Program.

She led the U.S. government reviews of the Intergovernmental Panel on Climate Change second and third assessment reports in 1995 and 2000. She also led the US delegations to the IPCC Plenary in Shanghai in 2001; Montreal in 1999; Costa Rica in 1998; and as alternate head in Mexico City in 1996. She headed the U.S. Delegation for the U.S./China bilateral on Climate Science in 2000.

She served as the Clinton Administration's senior scientific adviser on environmental research and development, with responsibilities for scientific input and guidance on a range of national and international environmental issues, including global change, air and water quality, biodiversity and ecosystem management.

== Academic career ==
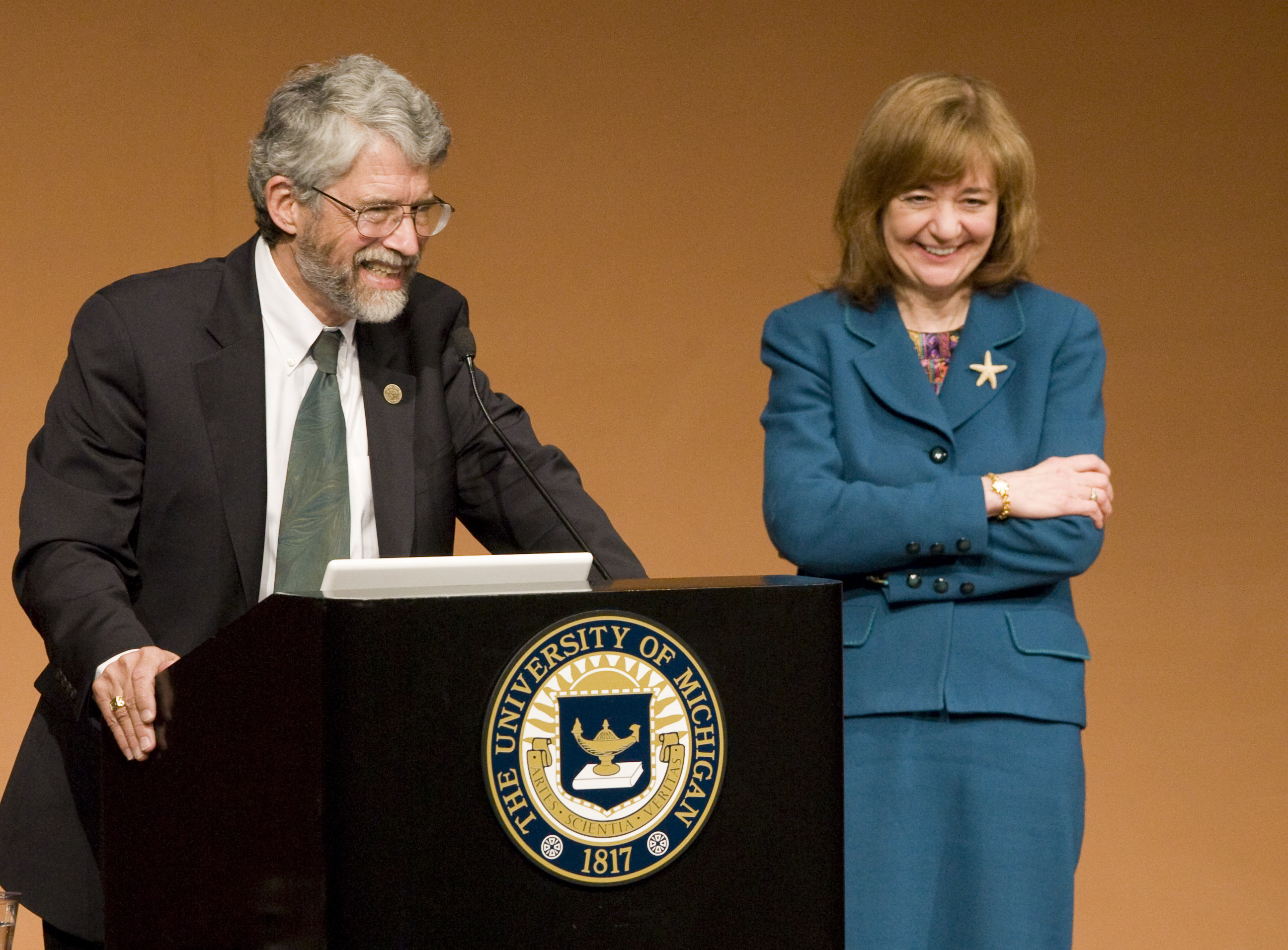
John Holdren and Bierbaum

Bierbaum matriculated from Boston College in 1974 with a B.S. in biology and a B.A. in English. She earned her Ph.D. in ecology and evolution from the State University of New York, Stony Brook in 1985.

Bierbaum was elected a Fellow of the American Academy of Arts and Sciences in 2007 and Fellow of the Ecological Society of America in 2012. She is also a Fellow of the American Association for the Advancement of Science. She was elected a member of the National Academy of Sciences in April 2019.

In 2000, she received the Waldo E. Smith Medal of the American Geophysical Union; in 1999, she received the "Climate Protection Award" from the United States Environmental Protection Agency.

Bierbaum is a trustee of the University Corporation for Atmospheric Research (UCAR); and a board member for the Federation of American Scientists, The Energy Foundation, the Gordon E. and Betty I. Moore Foundation and the Environmental and Energy Study Institute.

She is a member of the John D. and Catherine T. MacArthur Foundation's Science Advisory Council, the International Advisory Board for the journal Frontiers in Ecology and the Environment, the National Research Council's Board on Atmospheric Sciences and Climate, the Design Committee for The Heinz Center's The State of the Nation's Ecosystems project, and the Executive Committee for the Tyler Prize for Environmental Achievement.

At the University of Michigan, she co-chaired its Sustainability Task Force and the Deans' Council of the Graham Environmental Sustainability Institute. She was also a faculty affiliate in the Science, Technology, and Public Policy (STPP) Program at the Gerald R. Ford School of Public Policy. In 2007, Michigan Governor Jennifer Granholm appointed her to serve on the Michigan Climate Action Council.

== Earlier in Washington ==
Before joining the School of Natural Resources and Environment (SNRE, University of Michigan), Bierbaum was acting director of the Office of Science and Technology Policy (OSTP).

Preceding that, she directed the Environment Division at OSTP. She was confirmed by the U.S. Senate as Associate Director for Environment of OSTP on July 30, 1998.

Her career in Washington began in 1980 with a Congressional Fellowship. She continued working in the Office of Technology Assessment on a range of environmental issues, working with various Congressional committees to address science and policy concerns posed in such areas as acid rain, marine pollution and ozone depletion.

== Research work ==
She co-authored Confronting Climate Change: Avoiding the Unmanageable and Managing the Unavoidable, a report prepared at the request of the Commission on Sustainable Development (2007). She is also the primary author of Changing By Degrees: Steps to Reduce Greenhouse Gases. This report (1991) identified a series of technical options to reduce U.S. and worldwide emissions. In 1993, she directed and was the primary author of the two-volume study, Preparing for an Uncertain Climate, which outlines a sustainable development strategy for the United States.

Bierbaum's doctoral work focused on understanding how multiple environmental stresses affect physiological parameters of growth, reproduction and glycogen storage in shellfish and their symbiotic organisms (pea crabs).

Government offices
Preceded by Neal Lane	Director of the Office of Science and Technology Policy; Acting; 2001	Succeeded by Clifford Gabriel; Acting
