= Brian Moynihan =

American businessman, banking executive and lawyer

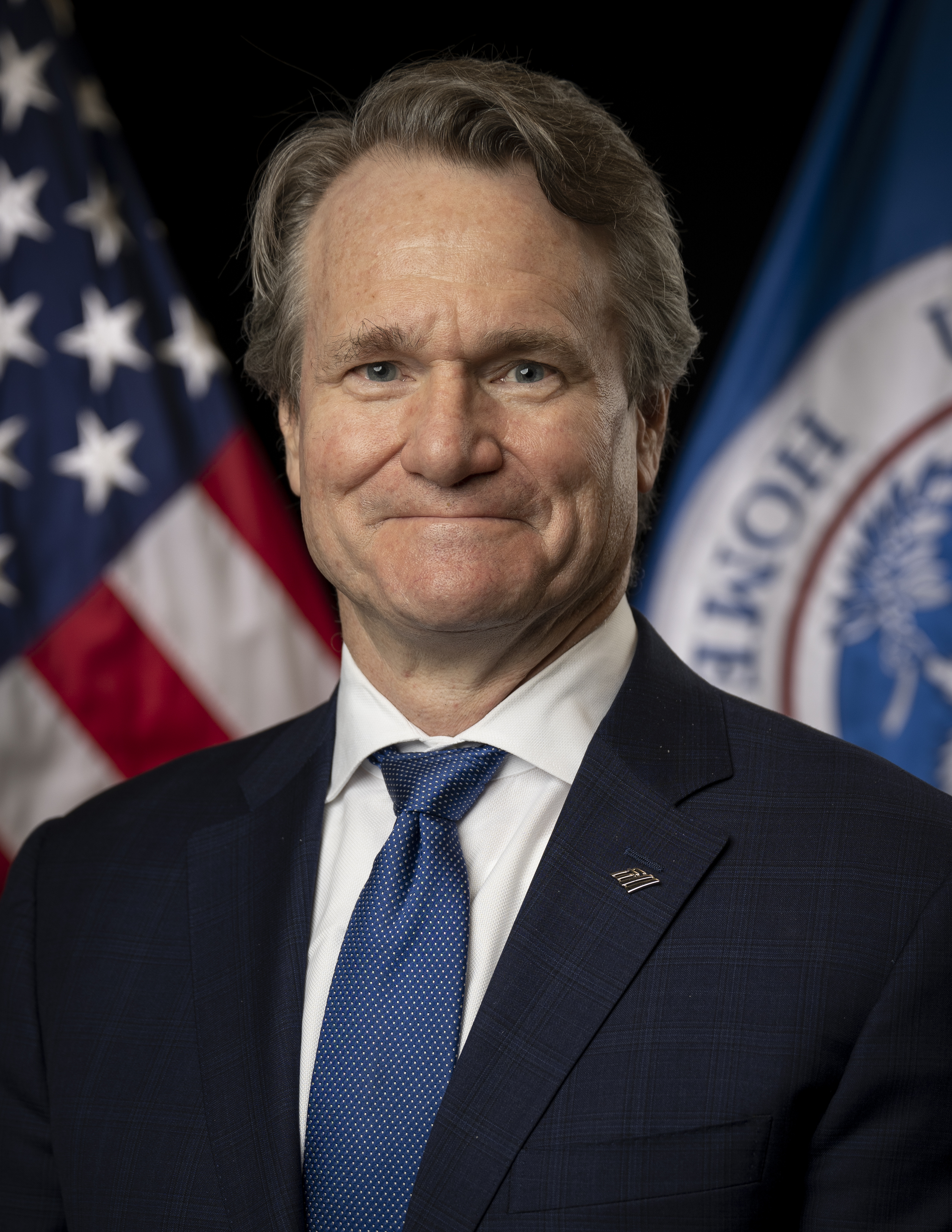
- Moynihan in 2022

22nd Chancellor of Brown University
- Incumbent
- Assumed office 2024
- Preceded by: Samuel M. Mencoff

Personal details
- Born: Brian Thomas Moynihan; October 9, 1959 (age 67) Marietta, Ohio, U.S.
- Spouse: Susan Berry
- Children: 3
- Education: Brown University (AB); University of Notre Dame (JD)
- Occupation: Chairman and CEO of BofA

Brian Thomas Moynihan (born October 9, 1959) is an American lawyer and banker. He is the chairman, president, and CEO of Bank of America, having been promoted to these positions in 2010.

Moynihan is a member of the Council on Competitiveness board and Partnership for Rhode Island board, among other boards. He became the Chancellor of Brown University in July 2024.

== Early life and education ==
Moynihan was born on October 9, 1959, in Marietta, Ohio. He was the sixth of eight children in a Catholic family of Irish descent. Brian's dad was a research scientist for DuPont, his mother stayed at home, then started working in insurance in her 50s. Moynihan graduated from Brown University in 1981, where he majored in history, co-captained the rugby team, and met his future wife, classmate Susan E. Berry. He wanted to be a lawyer, like his grandfather, and earned a Juris Doctor from the University of Notre Dame Law School, before returning to Providence, Rhode Island, to join Edwards & Angell LLP, the city's largest corporate law firm.

== Career ==
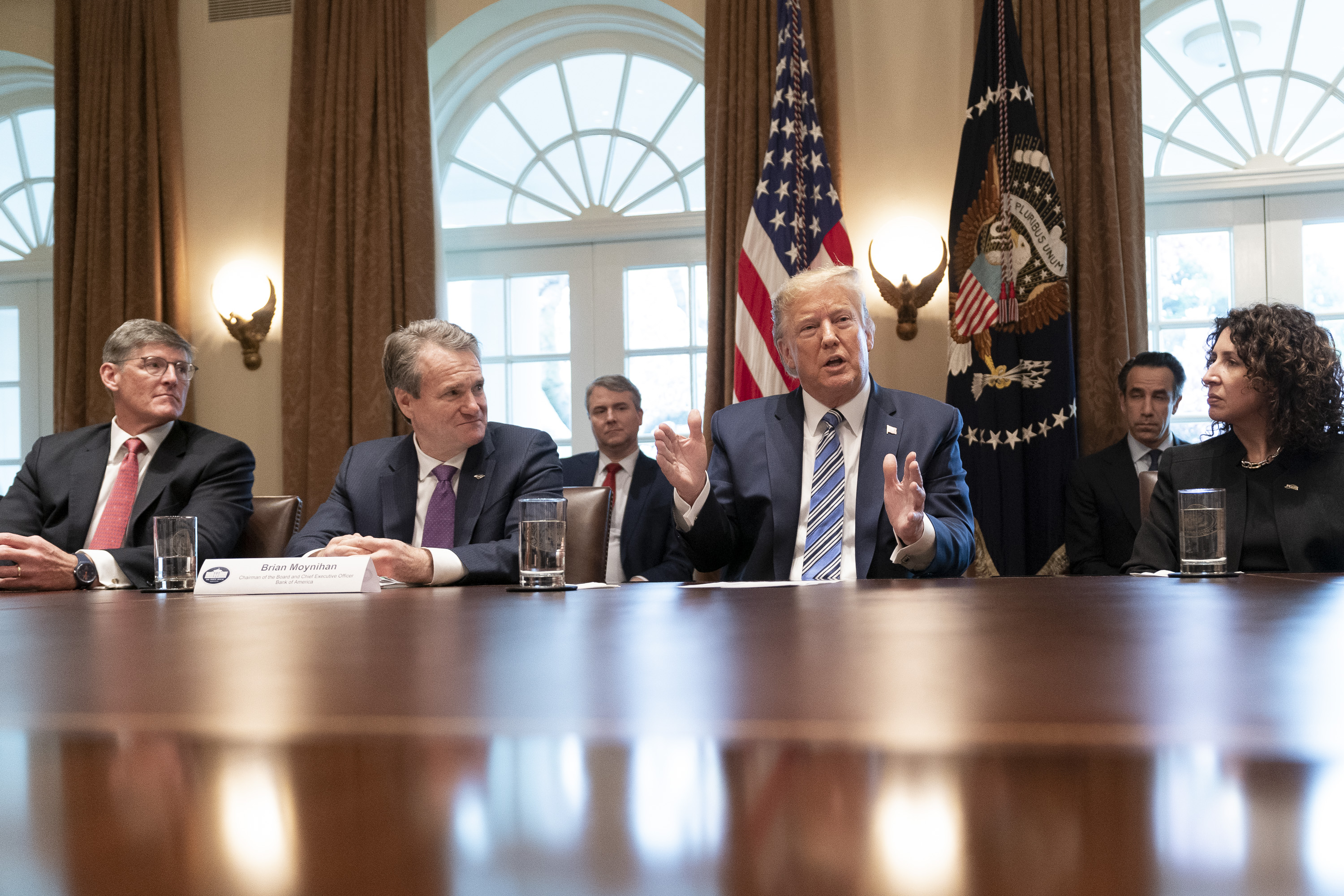
Moynihan with President Donald Trump in March 2020

Moynihan held numerous banking positions before becoming president of consumer and small business banking (SBB) at Bank of America in January 2009.

He joined Fleet Boston bank in April 1993 as a deputy general counsel. From 1999 to April 2004, he was an executive vice president, managing Fleet's brokerage and wealth management division. After Bank of America (BofA) merged with FleetBoston Financial in 2004, he joined BofA as president of global wealth and investment management. He was named CEO of Merrill Lynch after its sale to BofA in September 2008 and became the CEO of Bank of America after Ken Lewis stepped down in 2010.

On August 25, 2011, CNBC's Drew Sandholm noted that "[d]espite having recently told investors Bank of America ... doesn't need to raise capital, CEO Brian Moynihan will accept $5 billion in capital from famed investor Warren Buffett. The deal not only surprised the Fast Money traders on Thursday, it also caused them to question Moynihan's credibility."

On September 12, 2011, CNBC's John Carney noted that Moynihan had "once again laid out his company's plan to meet regulatory capital requirements and denied that the bank will have to issue new stock to raise capital ... [Moynihan] says that Warren Buffett's $5 billion counts as Tier 1 Capital. But the markets have largely ignored the investment, most likely because it looks a lot more like debt than capital."

On October 26, 2011, Huffington Post blogger Jillian Berman noted that BoA "has also been hammered in the stock and bond markets" and "was the worst performer in the Dow Jones Industrial Average for two quarters straight ... while Moody's downgraded the bank last month". She added while Jamie Dimon, JPMorgan Chase's CEO, received a $19 million raise in 2010, Moynihan's salary stayed level at $950,000.

On December 27, 2011, Julia LaRoche wrote in Business Insider that Moynihan "admitted the proposed $5 monthly fee for debit card users wasn't the best idea". She quoted him as saying: "We struck a chord with customers that no one anticipated. We learned our lesson and stopped it." It was later reported that the failed fee plan led to a 20% increase in account closures during the last three months of 2011.

In November 2023, Bloomberg reported that Moynihan had set up a succession plan for his eventual replacement; at that time, he remained CEO and chair of Bank of America's board. Moynihan stated he planned on remaining CEO for years. That same year, Moynihan's total compensation from Bank of America was $27.8 million. In 2024, Bank of America paid Moynihan a total of $35 million, which amounted to a 21 percent pay raise year-over-year. In 2025, his total compensation rose to $41 million.

Moynihan is a fellow at Brown University, serving from 2016 to 2027. He is also a member of The Business Council, the Business Roundtable, and other business organizations. He also sits on the steering committee of the Council for Inclusive Capitalism.

== Criticism ==
Bank of America's 2012 shareholder meeting in Charlotte, North Carolina convened "as protests swirled inside and outside", according to the San Francisco Chronicle. There were complaints from shareholders regarding the bank's mortgage servicing operations, decreased share prices and other issues. Protesters converged outside the building, which they were barred from entering by police and metal barricades. In response to the criticisms of the bank's mortgage servicing operations, Moynihan tried to reassure the audience, saying "you can call us and we will figure it out."

In 2012, Moynihan (along with other CEOs) was criticized by Sen. Bernie Sanders (I-VT) in a report titled "Top Corporate Tax Dodgers". According to the report, Moynihan's Bank of America paid no federal income tax in 2010 and received a $1.9 billion tax refund, despite making $4.4 billion in profits. The report also includes criticisms of Bank of America's use of tax havens.

In January 2025, Moynihan was rebuked by President Donald Trump for not taking "conservative business", with Moynihan responding that Bank of America provides banking services to "everybody". He subsequently came out against the "over-regulation" of banks in February 2025, saying there is "a lot of burden upon the banking system to both report suspicious activity and do a lot of analysis".

== Accolades ==
In 2020, Moynihan received Chief Executive's "CEO Of The Year" award, which is given to "extraordinary American business leaders" and peer-selected. In 2023, he was honored as a "Distinguished Bostonian" by the Greater Boston Chamber of Commerce, and one of the 150 most influential Bostonians by Boston Magazine.

In March 2026, Moynihan received the UNC Charlotte Distinguished Service Award for "leadership, service, and impact".

== Personal life ==
Moynihan lives in Wellesley, Massachusetts with his wife, Susan, and three children. He frequently commutes between Boston and Bank of America's headquarters in Charlotte, North Carolina, using the company's private jets. This practice has come under scrutiny from some shareholders, with Moynihan defending his presence in "multiple locations".

Business positions
| Preceded by Ken Lewis | CEO of Bank of America; 2010–present | Incumbent |
