= Journal of Nanoparticle Research =

- Discipline: Nanotechnology
- Language: English
- Edited by: Mihail C. Roco

Publication details
- History: 1999-present
- Publisher: Springer Science+Business Media, part of Springer-Nature,
- Frequency: Monthly
- Impact factor: 2.6 (2024)

Standard abbreviations
- ISO 4: J. Nanoparticle Res.

Indexing
- CODEN: JNARFA
- ISSN: 1388-0764 (print); 1572-896X (web)
- OCLC no.: 45789037

Links
- Journal homepage

The Journal of Nanoparticle Research is a monthly peer-reviewed scientific journal published by Springer Science+Business Media, part of Springer-Nature (springernature.com). It focuses mainly on physical, chemical, and biological phenomena and processes in structures of sizes comparable to a few nanometers. It was established in 1999 and the editor-in-chief is Mihail C. Roco (National Science Foundation). According to the Journal Citation Reports, the journal has a 2024 impact factor of 2.6.
