= Rice University's Baker Institute for Public Policy =

Think tank in Houston

Coordinates: 29.7166°N 95.4027°W

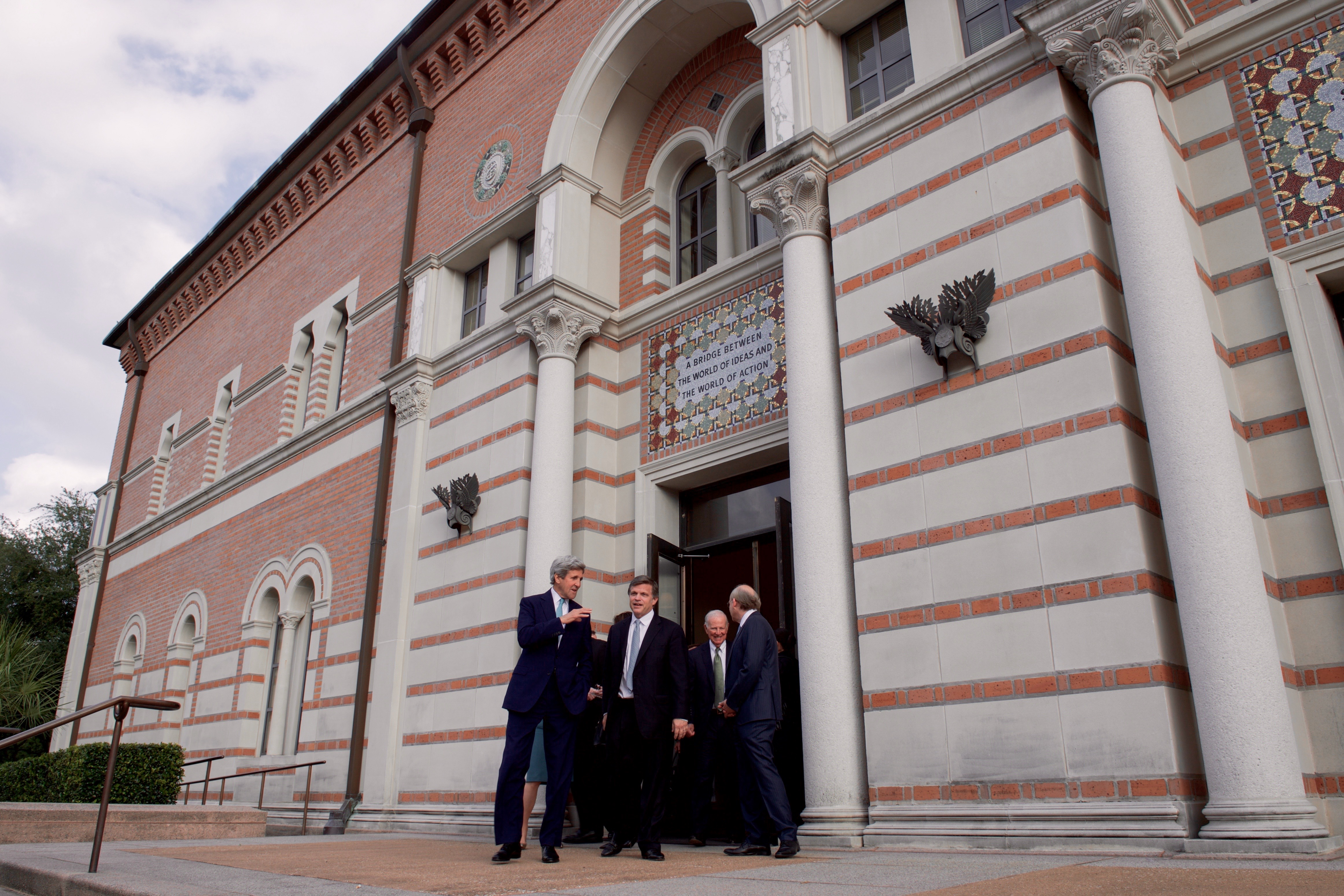
- Secretary Kerry walks with Rice University historian Brinkley across Rice's campus in Houston in 2016.
- Formation: 1993; 33 years ago
- Type: Public policy think tank
- Location: Rice University, Houston, Texas, U.S.
- Director: David M. Satterfield
- Budget: $6.76 million (2012)
- Website: bakerinstitute.org

The Rice University's Baker Institute for Public Policy (formerly known as the James A. Baker III Institute for Public Policy) is an American think tank housed on the campus of Rice University in Houston, Texas. Founded in 1993, it functions as a center for public policy research. It is named for James A. Baker, III, former United States secretary of state, secretary of the treasury, and White House chief of staff. It is directed by Ambassador David M. Satterfield and funded mainly by donor contributions, endowments, and research grants.

The institute employs scholars and researchers from a variety of backgrounds. Its current research includes centers for different areas: the Center for Energy Studies, the Center for Health and Biosciences, the Center for the Middle East, the Center for Public Finance, the McNair Center for Entrepreneurship and Innovation, and the Center for the U.S. and Mexico. The institute also houses programs on biomedical research, China studies, U.S. health systems transformation, drug policy, global health, international economics, Latin America, presidential elections, religion and public policy, science and technology, space, and the rights of women and refugees. The University of Pennsylvania's Think Tanks and Civil Societies Program ranked the Baker Institute No. 1 among university-affiliated think tanks in 2020.

In addition to its research, the institute offers programs for undergraduate and graduate students to engage with the world of policy and organizes events in which political, diplomatic, and community leaders speak on Rice's campus.

== History ==
The Baker Institute was founded in 1993. James Baker envisioned a public policy institute where “statesmen and scholars work[ed] in an atmosphere of intellectual excellence and strict nonpartisanship to develop fresh, informed approaches to policy,” while the idea for a public policy institute on campus came from Rice University political science professor Richard Stoll. In 1994, a ceremony to honor the ground-breaking for the new building brought together four U.S. presidents: Gerald Ford, Jimmy Carter, Ronald Reagan, and George H. W. Bush. Bush and Ford were present, while Carter and Reagan contributed video messages.

In 1994, Ambassador Edward P. Djerejian was selected as the institute's founding director.

== Research programs ==
=== Center for the Middle East ===
The Baker Institute Edward P. Djerejian Center for the Middle East has been involved in conflict resolution projects. The focus of the Center includes the Israeli–Palestinian conflict, the Levant, and women and human rights in the Middle East. Research has focused on the civil war in Syria, security in Afghanistan, U.S. relations in the region, energy in relation to the Middle East, and analysis of the Iran nuclear deal. The program brings together well-known speakers and researchers to offer their insights into the complex challenges facing the Middle East.

=== Center for Energy Studies ===
The Center for Energy Studies was founded in October 2012 and provides policymakers, corporate leaders, and the public with “data-driven analysis of issues that influence energy markets.” In 2020, the center was ranked the No. 1 energy and resource think tank for the third year in a row by the University of Pennsylvania's Think Tanks and Civil Societies Program's Global Go To Think Tank Index.

=== China Studies Program ===
The China Studies Program examines the landscape of contemporary China. The program worked on transcribing public service announcements from various cities in China. The transcripts are available at the Center for Digital Scholarship at Fondren Library at Rice University.

=== Drug Policy Program ===
The Drug Policy Program focuses on the implications of the war on drugs and “pursues research and open debate on local and national drug policies based on common sense, driven by human rights interests, and focused on reducing the death, disease, crime, and suffering associated with drug use.”

=== Center for Health and Biosciences ===
The Center for Health and Biosciences focuses on developing health policy recommendations. Researchers from Rice University and the Texas Medical Center address four major research themes: U.S. health care, global health, public health, and the future of medicine. Notable staff include Vivian Ho and Peter Hotez.

=== International Economics ===
The International Economics Program focuses particularly on emerging markets, but also on debt, China’s economic growth, and governing the global economy. Policy recommendations are produced on “how global economic trends are developing, and what policies can optimally address the challenges that arise.”

=== Latin America Initiative ===
The Latin America Initiative has two main projects, the Americas Project and the Vecinos Lecture Series. The initiative focuses on the challenges and opportunities that face the region and “brings together leading stakeholders from government, the private sector, academia, and civil society to exchange their views on pressing issues confronting the region.”

=== McNair Center for Entrepreneurship and Innovation ===
The McNair Center for Entrepreneurship and Innovation aims to provide policymakers, scholars and the general public with comprehensive analyses of the issues that affect entrepreneurship and innovation at three levels: federal and state policy, municipal ecosystems, and academic entrepreneurship and innovation. The center was founded with a gift of $8 million from Robert McNair and his wife Janice, through the Robert and Janice McNair Foundation.

=== Center for the U.S. and Mexico ===
The Mexico Center works to create policy research on issues that affect the Mexico and the United States. The center's research agenda currently focuses on eight major issues: trade, energy, telecommunications, health care, infrastructure, education, human mobility, and the administration of justice/security.

=== Presidential Election Program ===
The Presidential Elections program focuses on nonpartisan analysis of presidential elections.

=== Religion and Public Policy Program ===
The Religion Policy Program studies the effects of religion on politics in America and around the world on several topics, including voting patterns, the role of faith-based organizations, conflict resolution, and religious fundamentalism in the Middle East.

=== Space Policy Program ===
The International Space Medicine Summit brings together “leading physicians, space biomedical scientists, engineers, astronauts and cosmonauts from the space-faring nations for high-level discussions about the research needed to prevent and/or mitigate the medical and biomedical challenges spacefarers experience in long-duration spaceflight.” Notable staff have included Neal F. Lane and the late George W.S. Abbey.

=== Science and Technology Policy Program ===
The Science and Technology Policy Program focuses on issues that include “space, health, medicine, energy and the environment, national and domestic security, science education, and the public’s understanding and trust of science.” Notable staff include Robert Bazell, Neal F. Lane, Kristin R.W. Matthews, and Robert Curl.

== Major publications ==
The Iraq Study Group was supported by the Baker Institute and co-chaired by James Baker. It was a bipartisan panel with the mandate to "conduct a forward-looking, independent assessment of the current and prospective situation on the ground in Iraq, its impact on the surrounding region, and consequences for U.S. interests." The group produced the Iraq Study Group Report in 2006.

== Student involvement ==
=== Jesse Jones Summer Leadership Center ===
Students secure their internships independently of the institute but with support from experts and staff members. The mission of the program is to “offer Rice University undergraduate students hands-on experience in the world of public policy research and analysis in our nation's capital.” The program was founded in 2004. Since its inception, it has funded 141 student summer internships at government offices, think tanks, and nonprofits in Washington, D.C.

=== Moscow Summer Intern Program ===
Undergraduates from Rice and other U.S. universities can apply for a two-week summer space policy program which “combines visits to Russian space facilities with tours of cultural and historical sites in and around the Moscow Oblast region” as well as working in teams “to develop simulated interplanetary space missions” with students from Bauman Moscow State Technical University.

=== Baker Institute Student Forum ===
In 2002, a group of students began the Baker Institute Student Forum with the goal of “increasing students’ interest in exploring and contributing to the resolution of pressing policy issues.” The forum holds an annual student policy competition in which students analyze policy issues and offer recommendations on a specified topic. The Baker Institute also publishes the Rice Journal of Public policy, which is the “undergraduate journal of scholarship in domestic and international public policy.”

=== Graduate Programs ===
The Master of Global Affairs Program is a 2-year professional master’s degree program developed by the Baker Institute and Rice’s School of Social Sciences. The program faculty come from both the School of Social Sciences and the Baker Institute.

The Master of Energy Economics Program is a 12-month professional master’s program in energy economics developed by the Baker Institute and Rice’s Economics Department.
