= Rita R. Colwell =

American microbiologist (born 1934)

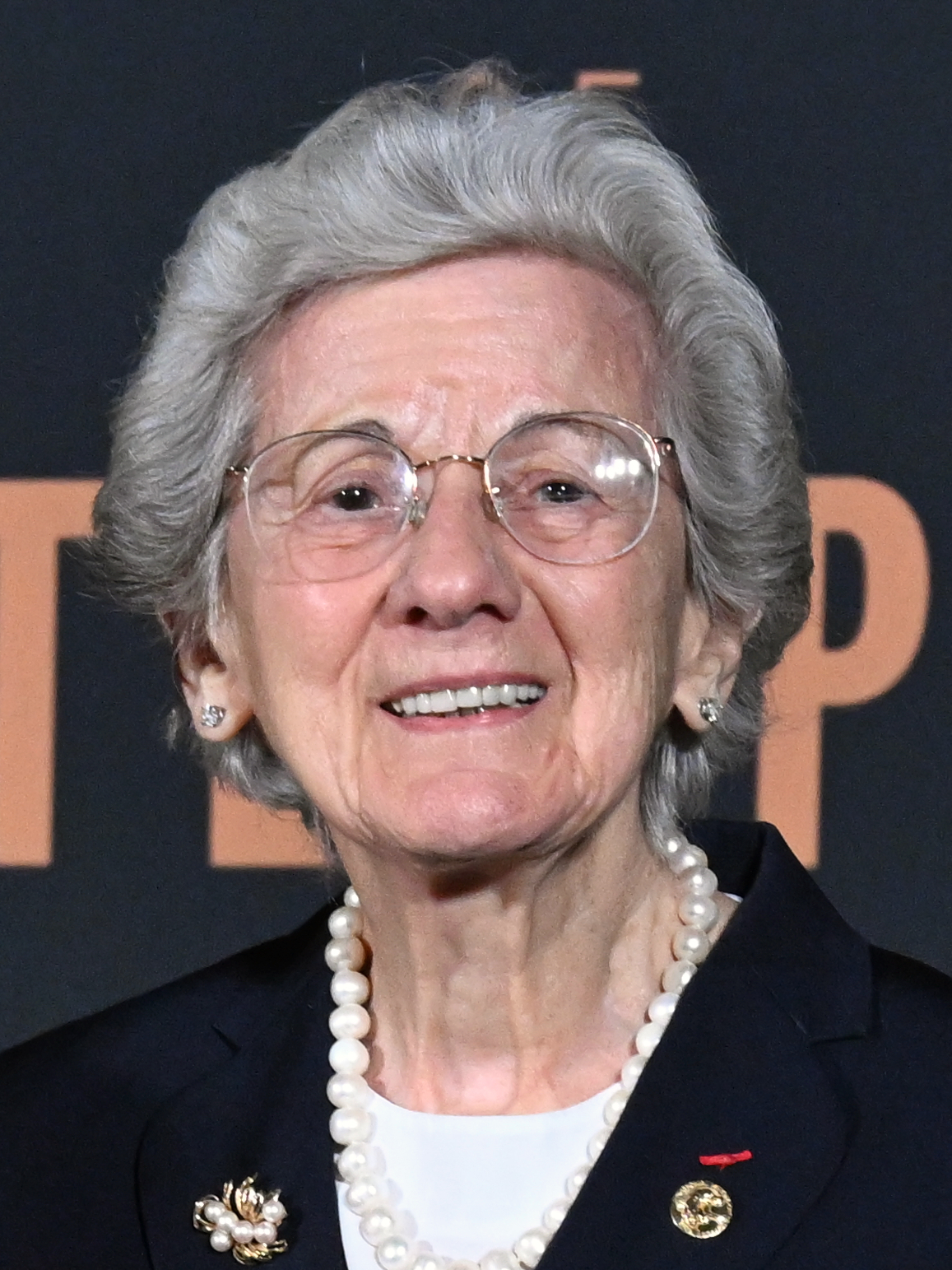
- Colwell in 2025

11th Director of the National Science Foundation
- In office 1998–2004
- President: Bill Clinton; George W. Bush
- Preceded by: Neal Francis Lane
- Succeeded by: Arden L. Bement Jr.

Personal details
- Born: November 23, 1934 (age 91) Beverly, Massachusetts, U.S.
- Education: Purdue University; University of Washington
- Scientific career
- Fields: Microbiology
- Workplaces: National Science Foundation; University of Maryland College Park; Johns Hopkins Bloomberg School of Public Health; Georgetown University
- Thesis: Commensal bacteria of marine animals; a study of their distribution, physiology and taxonomy (1961)
- Doctoral advisor: John Liston
- Doctoral students: Jody Deming

Rita Rossi Colwell (born November 23, 1934) is an American environmental microbiologist and scientific administrator. Colwell holds degrees in bacteriology, genetics, and oceanography and studies infectious diseases. Colwell is the founder and Chair of CosmosID, a bioinformatics company. From 1998 to 2004, she was the 11th Director and 1st female Director of the National Science Foundation. She has served on the board of directors of EcoHealth Alliance since 2012.

== Early life and education ==
Colwell was born on November 23, 1934, in Beverly, Massachusetts. Her parents, Louis and Louise Rossi, had eight children, Rita being the seventh child born into the Rossi household. Neither her mother nor her father were from scientific backgrounds. In 1956, Rita obtained a B.S. in bacteriology from Purdue University. She also received her M.S. in genetics from Purdue in 1957. Colwell obtained her Ph.D. from the University of Washington in aquatic microbiology under the direction of microbiologist John Liston in 1961. She participated in a post-doctoral fellowship at the Canadian National Research Council in Ottawa.

== Career ==
Colwell describes her research path from fruit fly geneticist to world class biologist, and the key decision points and supporters along the way.

Colwell is recognized for her study of global infectious disease spread through water sources and its impacts on global health. Through this research, she has developed an international network that has brought attention to the emergence of new infectious diseases in drinking/bathing water, pertaining mostly to its role on the developing world.

=== Cholera research ===
During early research and study of cholera, Colwell discovered that cholera can lay dormant in unfavorable conditions and then resume normal functions when conditions are favorable again.

Many of her research papers have focused on abating the spread of cholera in the developing world by improving ways to track its spread and researching inexpensive methods for filtrating out the infection agents of cholera in water systems. Some of these tracking methods include observing weather patterns, surface water temperatures, chlorophyll concentrations, and rainfall patterns. Colwell's findings of correlations between these phenomena showed that the infection rate of cholera is connected to water temperatures. This rising temperature causes algae blooms that host cholera bacteria, and rainfall and extreme weather patterns aid in spreading cholera among water systems. Colwell also concluded that climate change will have a profound impact on the spread of cholera.

Colwell has proposed ways people in the developing world can use inexpensive methods to filter water when water treatment facilities are not available. In one study spanning about 3 years, 65 villages in rural Bangladesh comprising 133,000 individuals, participated in an experiment in which they used folded sari cloth or nylon mesh filters placed over water pots to acquire safe drinking water from their local waterways. These inexpensive and readily available materials yielded a 48% reduction in cholera, when compared with the control: absence of any type of filter.

=== National Science Foundation ===
Colwell was the first female director of the National Science Foundation (NSF) and held this position from 1998 to 2004. In a presentation to members of the foundation in 2002, she detailed what the foundation should address in the future. She explained that an educated society is critical not just for developing technology, but for supporting that development, both by the public and by the government.

Colwell is interested in K-12 science and mathematical education, and she is a proponent of increasing the number of women and minorities in science and engineering. Rita Colwell was responsible for doubling the funding to the NSF initiative ADVANCE, which supports the advancement of women in academic science and engineering careers. Colwell also pushed to invest $60 million as part of a new priority area in mathematical and statistical sciences.

In 2004, Colwell completed her term as director of the National Science Foundation. She then became the chief scientist at Canon U.S. Life Sciences, a division of Canon. She served as chairman of Canon U.S. Life Sciences until 2006 when she was named as Senior Advisor and Chairman Emeritus.

=== Academia ===
Colwell joined the faculty of the Department of Biology at Georgetown University in 1964, and she gained tenure there in 1966. While at Georgetown, Colwell and her research team were the first to learn that the causative agent of cholera was found naturally in the waters of the Chesapeake Bay. In 1972, Colwell accepted a tenured professorship at the University of Maryland. She remains a professor at the University of Maryland at College Park and at the Johns Hopkins Bloomberg School of Public Health. At the University of Maryland at College Park, she is a Distinguished University Professor in the Institute for Advanced Computer Studies (UMIACS), which is part of the university's College of Computer, Mathematical, and Natural Sciences.

=== CosmosID ===
Colwell founded the company CosmosID in 2008, and she currently serves as global science officer and chairman of the board. CosmosID is a bioinformatics company that develops various types of equipment to identify microbial activity in a variety of ecosystems.

=== EcoHealth Alliance ===
Colwell was elected to the Board of Directors of EcoHealth Alliance in November 2012.

== Publications and media ==
Colwell has authored or co-authored more than 800 scientific reports and publications, along with 19 books.

In 1977, Colwell produced the award-winning film Invisible Seas. In this 26-minute film, the microbiology department at the University of Maryland, College Park demonstrates what types of methodology are required of marine microbiologists when studying microorganisms in the ocean. They emphasize the importance of marine microbiologists studying microorganisms in the ocean in order to determine the impact pollution has had on our oceans.

Colwell is the founding editor of GeoHealth, a journal of the American Geophysical Union. Colwell recognized the increase in published Geohealth research due to the advancement in our understanding of how Earth and space science provides deeper insight into health and disease in both people and ecosystems.

Colwell's memoir "A Lab of One's Own: One Woman's Personal Journey Through Sexism in Science", written with Sharon Bertsch McGrayne, was released in August 2020.

Colwell is a co-author of a letter published in The Lancet titled "Statement in support of the scientists, public health professionals, and medical professionals of China combatting COVID-19" in which the authors declared, "We stand together to strongly condemn conspiracy theories suggesting that COVID-19 does not have a natural origin."

== Awards and recognition ==
Colwell is the recipient of 61 honorary degrees, including Honorary Doctorates from NUI Galway, the University of Notre Dame, The New School, and the University of St Andrews in 2016.

- Activities in the International Union of Microbiological Societies from 1962 to 1986
- Member of the National Science Board (1984–1990)
- President of the American Society for Microbiology (1984–85)
- 1991, Maryland Women's Hall of Fame
- The Colwell Massif in Antarctica was named after her in 1994.
- President of the American Association for the Advancement of Science (1996)
- Eleventh Director of the United States National Science Foundation, and the first woman to hold this position (1998–2004).
- Golden Plate Award of the American Academy of Achievement (1999)
- Awarded the Order of the Rising Sun-Gold and Silver Star-by the Emperor of Japan (2005)
- 2005, Induction into the National Women's Hall of Fame* National Medal of Science of the United States (2006)
- In 2006, Colwell received the National Medal of Science from former United States President George W. Bush.
- The 2008 Leonard Brockington Visitor to Queen's University
- President of the American Institute of Biological Sciences in 2008* Stockholm Water Prize (2010)
- Chair of the National Academy of Sciences Committee on Women in Science, Engineering and Medicine (2016)
- Prince Sultan Bin Abdulaziz International Prize for Water; Creativity Award, 2016
- Mahathir Science Award (2016)
- Member of the Academies of Science of Sweden, Canada, Bangladesh, India, and the United States
- The American Academy of Arts and Sciences
- The American Philosophical Society
- Royal Society of Canada
- Awarded the Vannevar Bush Award in 2017
- Awarded the Lee Kuan Yew Water Prize in 2018
- Foremother Award from The National Center for Health Research in 2018
- William Bowie Medal from the American Geophysical Union in 2020
- Columbus Center in Baltimore was renamed Rita Rossi Colwell Center in her honor in 2022

== Personal life ==
Colwell met her husband, Jack Colwell, when he was a physical chemistry graduate student at Purdue. They had two daughters and three grandchildren. Jack H. Colwell (1931–2018) was a scientist at the National Bureau of Standards.

Professional and academic associations
Preceded by Francisco J. Ayala	President of the American Association for the Advancement of Science; 1996	Succeeded by Jane Lubchenco
Government offices
Preceded by Neal Lane	Director of the National Science Foundation; 1998-2004	Succeeded by Arden L. Bement Jr.
