= Sharon Bertsch McGrayne =

American science writer

- Education: Swarthmore College
- Occupation: Writer
- Writing career
- Subject: Science
- Notable works: Nobel Prize Women in Science; Prometheans in the Lab; The Theory that Would Not Die
- Website: www.mcgrayne.com

Sharon Bertsch McGrayne (born c. 1942) is a science writer known for her nonfiction books about the history of mathematics and scientists. Her work includes Nobel Prize Women in Science, Prometheans in the Lab, and The Theory that Would Not Die.

== Early life ==
McGrayne was born around 1942. She graduated from Swarthmore College and later worked as a newspaper reporter and contributor to Encyclopædia Britannica.

== Writing career ==
McGrayne published her first book, Nobel Prize Women in Science, in 1993. It explores the biographies of the nine women who had won Nobel prizes at the time, as well as five other women who many believed should have won the prize. In McGrayne's research, she interviewed around 200 people including some of the Nobel winners, and collected background on the discrimination and environments women scientists faced during these times. McGrayne was motivated to write the book to inspire more women to pursue scientific careers, especially given her observation that Marie Curie was the only well-known women Nobel winner who was taught in schools.

Nobel Prize Women in Science earned McGrayne one of ten Governor's Writers Awards in Washington for 1995. She published an expanded edition in 1998, prompted by the 1995 awarding of another Nobel prize to a woman. Virginia U. Collier's review described the book as accessible and informative, illustrating the progress of women in science over time and also warning of the challenges they continue to face due to the current structure of scientific career paths. Kirkus Reviews described it as a "first-rate compendium of bios" showing the common struggles and convictions of the scientists. Publishers Weekly said the study of the women's struggles against discrimination were moving and could "offer advice and inspiration, if small comfort, to women in science today."

McGrayne also wrote 365 Surprising Scientific Facts, Breakthroughs, and Discoveries. In 1997, McGrayne published Blue Genes and Polyester Plants: 365 More Surprising Scientific Facts, Breakthroughs, and Discoveries. She followed this with the 2000 Iron, Nature's Universal Element, co-written with Eugenie Vorburger Mielczarek. The book summarizes the chemistry of iron and its biological uses, also recounting how some of these properties were discovered. Benjamin Walcott, reviewing for The Quarterly Review of Biology, thought the book was too high-level to offer much value over an encyclopedia.

Prometheans in the Lab was published in 2001 and focused on nine chemist biographies to illustrate the impact of chemistry on modern technology. For Prometheans in the Lab, McGrayne won a 2002 Washington State Book Award. Alan J. Rocke appreciated the book's careful and engaging treatment of the benefits and harms caused by chemists. Rocke praised the book's sourcing, critiqued some early factual errors, and overall recommended the book for general audiences as well as academic historians.

In 2011, McGrayne published The Theory That Would Not Die, about the history of the pathway to acceptance of Bayesian theory. It describes notable scientists' opposition to the theory and how they slowed its acceptance, as well as important moments in its use like when mathematicians at Bletchley Park cracked the Enigma code. Maurizio Ferconi reviewed the book, deeming it a good introduction to the historical context of Bayesian statistics for curious readers. Andrew I. Dale recommended the book as an accessible and wide-ranging exploration of Bayesian statistics for general readers or statisticians. John Allen Paulos, for The New York Times, enjoyed the book's stories of statisticians but felt the extensive exploration of the applications of Bayes' theorem was formulaic. The Theory That Would Not Die helped inspire a 2014 issue of Statistical Science on case studies of the use of Bayesian statistics. The edition's editors, Kerrie L. Mengersen and Christian P. Robert, asked McGrayne to join the editorial team, and McGrayne edited all accepted papers.

McGrayne coauthored A Lab of One's Own with Rita Colwell in 2020. The memoir documents Colwell's career in microbiology and rise to the directorship of the National Science Foundation. It also describes her experiences and strategies towards systemic sexism within science. Kirkus recommended the book as a beautiful and "unforgettable" memoir containing shocking details on the challenges Colwell faced, and describes the book as "as much a call to arms as it is autobiography". In contrast, Publishers Weekly thought Colwell's achievements were overshadowed by the memoir's awkward writing and overly congratulatory tone, not recommending it for general readers. Beth Dalton, reviewing for Library Journal, recommended the book for those supporting women in STEM at universities and women facing career beginnings or struggles.

== Personal life ==
McGrayne lives in Seattle, Washington. Her husband is a professor of theoretical physics.

== Published works ==
- Nobel Prize Women in Science: Their Lives, Struggles, and Momentous Discoveries (1993, 1998)
- 365 Surprising Scientific Facts, Breakthroughs, and Discoveries (1994)
- Blue Genes and Polyester Plants: 365 More Surprising Scientific Facts, Breakthroughs, and Discoveries (1997)
- Iron, Nature's Universal Element: Why People Need Iron and Animals Make Magnets. By Eugenie Vorburger Mielczarek and Sharon Bertsch McGrayne (2000)
- Prometheans in the Lab: Chemistry and the Making of the Modern World (2001)
- The Theory That Would Not Die (2011)
- A Lab of One's Own: One Woman's Personal Journey Through Sexism in Science. By Rita Colwell and Sharon Bertsch McGrayne (2020)
