= Walter E. Massey =

American educator and physicist (born 1938)

14th President of the School of the Art Institute of Chicago
- In office 2010–2016
- Preceded by: Wellington Reiter
- Succeeded by: Elissa Tenny

10th President of Morehouse College
- In office 1995–2007
- Preceded by: Leroy Keith
- Succeeded by: Robert Michael Franklin, Jr.

9th Director of the National Science Foundation
- In office 1991–1993
- President: George H. W. Bush
- Preceded by: Erich Bloch
- Succeeded by: Neal Francis Lane

Personal details
- Born: April 5, 1938 (age 88) Hattiesburg, Mississippi
- Scientific career
- Education: Morehouse College; Washington University in St. Louis
- Fields: Theoretical physics
- Workplaces: Argonne National Laboratory; University of California; University of Chicago; Brown University; University of Illinois Urbana-Champaign
- Thesis: Ground state of liquid helium – boson solutions for mass 3 and 4 (1966)
- Doctoral advisor: Eugene Feenberg

Walter Eugene Massey (born April 5, 1938) is an American educator, physicist, and executive. President Emeritus of both the School of the Art Institute of Chicago (SAIC), and of Morehouse College, he is chairman of the board overseeing construction of the Giant Magellan Telescope. During his long career, Massey has served as head of the National Science Foundation, director of Argonne National Laboratory (ANL), chairman of Bank of America, and as trustee chair of the City Colleges of Chicago. He has also served in professorial and administrative posts at the University of California, University of Chicago, Brown University, and the University of Illinois Urbana-Champaign.

Born in Hattiesburg, Mississippi and raised in the Jim Crow era South, Massey became fascinated by mathematics as a youth. After attending Morehouse, a Historically black colleges and universities (HBCU), he pursued advanced study in physics earning his PhD from Washington University in St. Louis in the 1960s. He went on to post-graduate research at ANL near Chicago and joined the physics faculty at the University of Illinois, where African-American students sought his support and guidance in the 1960s struggle for civil rights. Massey decided to seek a better balance between research and activism as a physics professor at Brown University and was then invited back to head the ANL in the late 1970s. While he rose to become provost at the University of California in the 1990s, he decided to move when Morehouse asked him to come back to lead it in its mission as an HBCU. Following his retirement from Morehouse, and return to Chicago, he was called upon to head the Art Institute's school. He has served on multiple corporate and educational institution boards, and was asked to chair the board of Bank of America through a corporate transition in the wake of the 2008 financial crisis. While attending a board meeting for the University of Chicago in the 2010s, he was recruited to take on the Giant Magellan Telescope project.

Massey is the only individual to have served as both President of the American Association for the Advancement of Science (AAAS) and as Chair of the Association of Independent Colleges of Art and Design (AICAD). Additionally, Massey is the only individual to have received both the Enrico Fermi Award for Science and Technology from the Chicago Historical Society and the Public Humanities Award from Illinois Humanities. He is an elected member of both the American Philosophical Society and the American Academy of Arts and Sciences.

== Early life and education ==
Born on April 5, 1938, in Hattiesburg, Mississippi, Massey displayed a gift for mathematics as a child, and by the middle of high school his academic achievements had earned him a Ford Foundation fellowship to Morehouse College in Atlanta, Georgia. There, he began studying theoretical physics, which he chose in part because it gave him the chance to rise above the discrimination he had witnessed as a youth in the segregated South of the 1940s and 1950s. Massey graduated with a Bachelor of Science degree in 1958.

Mentors played an important role in Massey's academic life. Initially, he lacked direction at Morehouse until receiving the guidance of Sabinus H. Christensen, a white physics instructor teaching at the traditionally black college for men. Christensen's tutorials and support helped Massey earn a bachelor's degree in physics and mathematics. Later, he continued his studies in physics under Eugene Feenberg as a doctoral student at Washington University in St. Louis, Missouri.

While finishing his doctoral studies, Massey began working in 1966 as a member of the research staff at Argonne National Laboratory, which is operated for the U.S. Department of Energy by the University of Chicago. Massey's work at Argonne focused on the study of the many-body theory of liquids and solids, which attempts to explain the properties of systems of interacting particles in various states. He also continued his own research, applying correlated basic functions to both liquid and solid helium. Two years later, Massey accepted an assistant professorship at the University of Illinois.

== Career ==
=== Academics and early advocacy ===
While continuing to pursue his own research, Massey's tenure at the University of Illinois was also defined by his commitment to achieving racial and social equality as well as to improving access to science and technology education. On his first night on campus, 264 black students who had protested racial discrimination at the university were arrested. This incident led him to become advisor to the Black Students Association and first chairman of the Black Faculty and Staff Association. In his teaching, meanwhile, Massey found that many of his black students lacked the preparation in mathematics and the sciences necessary for success at the college level. This led to his interest in and commitment to the improvement of science teaching in high schools.

In 1970, Massey was offered an associate professorship at Brown University, which he accepted and would soon after complete some of his most significant academic research to date, collaborating with Humphrey Maris on the study of changes in sound waves in superfluid helium. By 1975, he had been appointed a full professor and dean of the college.

Also at Brown, Massey continued his efforts to support diversity in the sciences, developing and directing the Inner City Teachers of Science (INCTOS) program, through which Brown undergraduates studying to become science teachers served as mentors and tutors in urban high school science classes. The impact of this program earned Massey the distinguished service citation of the American Association of Physics Teachers in 1975.

In 1979, Massey's demonstrated success as a researcher and administrator at Brown led to his return to Argonne National Laboratory, this time as its director, in addition to which he was also appointed professor of physics at the University of Chicago.

=== Argonne National Laboratory ===
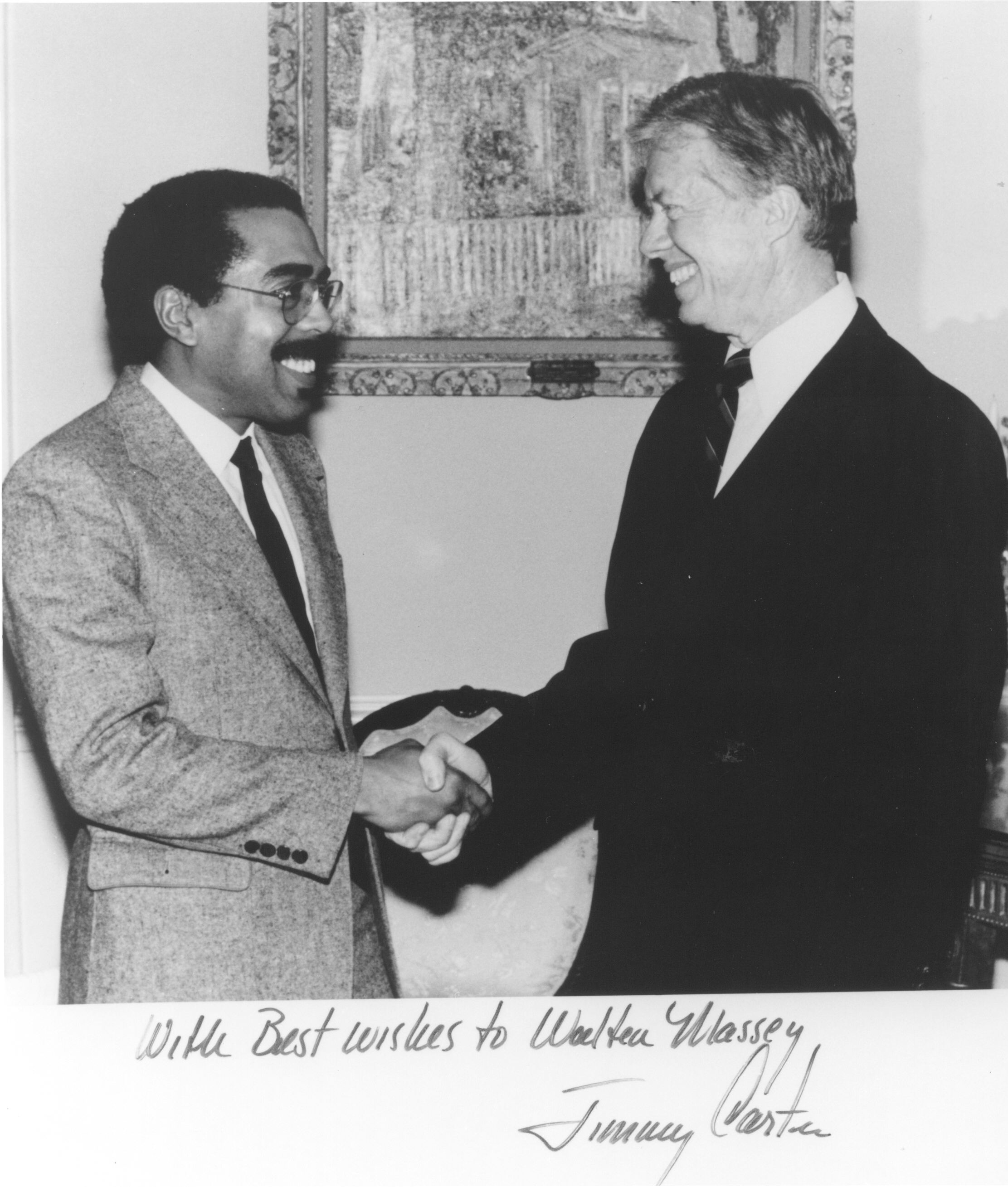
Massey (left) meeting with President Jimmy Carter on February 28, 1980

At Argonne, Massey assumed control of an annual budget of more than $250 million and a staff of almost four thousand, as well as a nebulous public relations image. The usefulness of national laboratories at the time was highly questioned, as their work was not being translated to industry. To the outside world, the laboratories lacked clear missions; on the inside, scientists and technicians lacked morale.

To address these issues, Massey reorganized the governance of the laboratory in the early 1980s, instituting what D. Allen Bromley, President George H. W. Bush's assistant for science and technology, referred to as "participatory democracy" among its scientists. At the same time, Massey responded to the lack of outside connections by helping form the Argonne National Laboratory – University of Chicago Development Corporation (ARCH), an organization that expedited the transfer of technologies created in the laboratory to industry and the marketplace. Other initiatives Massey undertook at Argonne include generating support for its nuclear energy programs in a time of drastic cutbacks and providing support and leadership for the funding of major research facilities at the laboratory, including the Intense Pulsed Neutron Source (IPNS), the Experimental Breeder Reactor II (EBR-II), and the initial funding for the Advanced Photon Source (APS).

While at Argonne and the University of Chicago, Massey also continued his work as an advocate on behalf of science education and awareness. In 1982, he headed the Chicago Mayoral Task Force on High-Technology Development and was the founding chair of the Chicago High-Tech Association. He also served on the Illinois Governor's Commission on Science and Technology and was highly visible on two educational fronts, helping to organize the Illinois Mathematics and Science Academy, one of the nation's first residential high schools devoted to science and math education, and serving as a trustee for the Academy for Mathematics and Science Teachers, which trained almost 17,000 Chicago public school teachers in those fields.

=== National Science Foundation ===
In 1989, Massey served as president of the American Association for the Advancement of Science. Massey's efforts to forge a more productive relationship between the scientific community, the U.S. government, and private industry culminated in 1990 with his appointment as director of the National Science Foundation (NSF) under President George H. W. Bush.

In this role, Massey embarked on a number of critical initiatives, including efforts to deepen the connection between academia and industry and the establishment of the Directorate for Social, Behavioral and Economic Sciences and the Commission on the Future of NSF. He also remained a strong proponent of basic research and science education, focusing on providing grants to university research centers and individuals and on upgrading pre-college science education, with an emphasis on attracting more women and minority groups to careers in science.

In February 2016, it was announced that scientists at the advanced Laser Interferometer Gravitational-wave Observatory (LIGO) had observed gravitational waves for the first time ever, confirming Albert Einstein's 1915 general theory of relativity. Dr. France Cordova, current director of the NSF, credited Massey's role in securing both approval and funding for the project nearly 25 years before. Massey was honored by LIGO scientist Kip Thorne, with an invitation to the Nobel Prize in Physics ceremony.

=== Other domestic and international science policy ===
In concert with his roles at Argonne and the University of Chicago, in 1987 Massey was named president of the American Association for the Advancement of Science, after having served as a board member for a number of years. As president, he led an organization listing over 140,000 members and 285 scientific societies. In this position, Massey—the first African American ever to hold that post—was able to shine a light on the problems of science education on a national level.

Under Massey's leadership, the AAAS aimed to improve science education in grades K–12 by sponsoring Project 2061, which attempted to structure curricula that would emphasize major scientific concepts. In doing so, Massey and the AAAS hoped to address the loss of the United States' economic competitiveness in the world market beginning in the mid-1980s and to better prepare the nation to respond to the health and environmental crises that were afflicting the world at the time. Generally, Massey's aim at the AAAS was to instigate a shift in the national dialogue, in which science and technology had historically been emphasized only ever during times of war.

In addition to his experience at the AAAS, Massey has been involved as a member or chair of many other major scientific organizations, societies, and commissions. He was vice president of the American Physical Society; chair of the Secretary of Energy Advisory Board (SEAB); and a member of the President's Council of Advisors of Science and Technology (PCAST) in two presidential administrations. Massey has also served as a member of the National Science Board, as well as on the Board of Trustees of Woods Hole Oceanographic Institute and the Marine Biological Laboratory.

Massey's service to the scientific community extends beyond domestic borders and is global in scope. He has served on the National Science Foundation's Advisory Committee for International Programs; was a member of the President's advisory board for the Hong Kong University of Science and Technology; co-chaired the planning efforts on cooperative programs between the Soviet Academy of Sciences and the AAAS; co-chaired the AAAS project to strengthen Scientific and Technical Engineering Infrastructure in sub-Saharan Africa; and was a founding member of the African Academy of Sciences, an organization designed to promote the advancement of scientific research and science education in sub-Saharan Africa.

Massey was also founding chairman of the National Society of Black Physicists, an organization established to promote the professional development of black physicists and enhance the number of African Americans entering the field of physics, and an advisor for the formation of the Society of Black Physics Graduate Students.

=== Return to academia ===
Following the completion of his tenure at the NSF, in 1993 Massey became provost and vice president for academic affairs at the University of California system, the nation's largest and perhaps most prestigious. In this role, he held the number two position in the state's university system, overseeing academic concerns at all of its nine campuses and its three national laboratories: Lawrence Berkeley, Lawrence Livermore and Los Alamos.

In 1995, he assumed the presidency of his alma mater, Morehouse College. As president of Morehouse, Massey created a vision that would take the college into the new century, which involved reinvigorating its campus, refreshing its core curriculum, and reigniting its fundraising efforts. Massey retired from Morehouse in 2007. From 2007 to 2010, he chaired the board for the Salzburg Global Seminar.

In 2010, Massey entered a new phase of his career, accepting the role of interim president, and later as full president, of the School of the Art Institute of Chicago, a leading school of art and design. He also served a term as chair of the Association of Independent Colleges of Art and Design. In 2016, Massey transitioned to his new role as chancellor of SAIC. Later that year, he also accepted the appointment to chair the board of the organization building the Giant Magellan Telescope in Chile. In 2017, Massey was named to chair the board of trustees of the City Colleges of Chicago.

=== Business, civic, and philanthropic career ===
In addition to his work as a scientist, college president, and leader in national and international science policy, Massey has served on the boards of several major multinational corporations, including McDonald's, where he remains a director, and, previously, Bank of America, where he rose to chairman, BP, Tribune Company, Motorola, First National Bank of Chicago, Continental Materials, Amoco, Research-Cottrell, and Analytic Services.

In 2009, he headed Bank of America, as its chairman of the board.

He has also served on the boards of numerous philanthropic organizations and foundations in the civic, social, cultural, and educational spaces, including the Mellon Foundation, the Commonwealth Fund, the MacArthur Foundation, the Rand Corporation, the National Center for Civil and Human Rights, the Smithsonian Institution, the Museum of Science and Industry in Chicago, and many others.

== Awards and honors ==
Massey has received 41 honorary degrees during his career.

He is a recipient of the Distinguished Service Citation of the American Association of Physics Teachers for his exceptional contributions to the teaching of physics, and was a member of the National Commission on Mathematics and Science Teaching for the 21st century, a commission established by Senator Glenn to recommend methods for improving science and math teaching in the United States.

In 1987, Massey was awarded the Order of Lincoln, the State of Illinois' highest honor. In 1992, Massey received the Golden Plate Award of the American Academy of Achievement presented by Awards Council member and Nobel Prize laureate Leon Lederman. In 1999, the Georgia State Senate passed resolution SR 113 "recognizing and commending Dr. Walter E. Massey, President of Morehouse College."

In May 2016, Massey received Illinois Humanities' Public Humanities Award, which "recognizes individuals and organizations that have helped transform lives and have strengthened communities through the humanities." In 2012, he received the Chicago Historical Society, Making History–Enrico Fermi Award in science and technology.

Massey was a member of both the American Philosophical Society and the American Academy of Arts and Sciences.

Government offices
Preceded by Erich Bloch	Director of the National Science Foundation; 1991–1993	Succeeded by Neal Lane
Business positions
Preceded by Ken Lewis	Chairman of Bank of America; 2009–2010	Succeeded by Charles O. Holliday
