= Vivian Ho (artist) =

Hong Kong painter and illustrator

Vivian Ho (often styled as 'Vvn' Ho) is a Hong Kong painter and illustrator. She graduated from Wesleyan University in Connecticut in 2012, majoring in Studio Arts and Economics; her first Solo Exhibition, called “We Could Start Over,” was held at the Artify Gallery in Hong Kong. The director of the Affordable Art Fair (Hong Kong) in 2014, described Ho as an important new-generation artist. In June 2016, A2Z Art Gallery Hong Kong held a solo exhibition for Vivian Ho titled "and then we are strangers again".

Ho's multimedia creations that she made for cultural, commercial, and public services show us her alternative imagination and sharp social insight, which people widely praise. She is good at watching ordinary people in city life and builds a surreal, romantic, film scene for them, so that they become a leading role in real life.
