= National Nanotechnology Initiative =

U.S. government cross-agency coordinating program

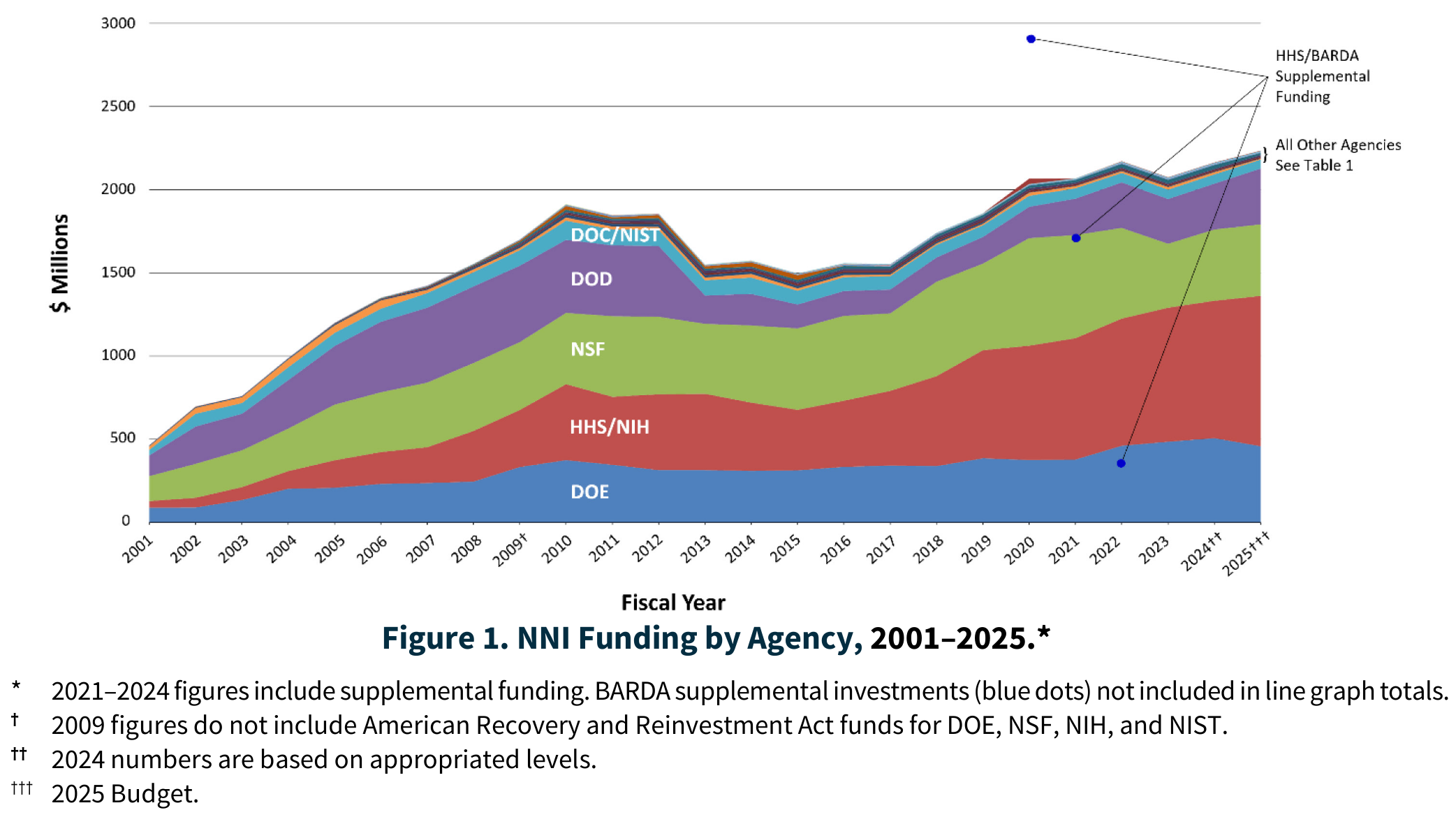
The President's 2025 Budget requests an all-time record of $2.2 billion for the NNI, with a sustained investment in foundational research that will fuel new discoveries and increasing investments in application-driven R&D to advance technologies of the future and address national priorities. Cumulative NNI funding since its inception in 2001 totals over $45 billion (including the 2025 request). The President's 2025 Budget supports nanoscale science, engineering, and technology R&D at 12 agencies.

The National Nanotechnology Initiative (NNI) is a research and development initiative which provides a framework to coordinate nanoscale research and resources among United States federal government agencies and departments.

== History ==
In the late 1990's, nanotechnology was emerging as a particularly high potential field and President Bill Clinton advocated for federal nanotechnology development. In addition to Clinton himself, many credit Presidential Science Advisor Neal Lane and Mihail C. Roco of the NSF with championing an initiative in a 1999 presentation to the White House.

In a 21 January 2000 speech at the California Institute of Technology, Clinton stated that "Some of our research goals may take twenty or more years to achieve, but that is precisely why there is an important role for the federal government." The NNI was officially launched in 2000 and received funding for the first time in FY2001.

President George W. Bush further increased funding for nanotechnology. On 3 December 2003 Bush signed into law the 21st Century Nanotechnology Research and Development Act (Pub. L. 108–153 (text) (PDF)), which authorizes expenditures for five of the participating agencies totaling $3.63 billion over four years.. This law is an authorization, not an appropriation, and subsequent appropriations for these five agencies have not met the goals set out in the 2003 Act. However, there are many agencies involved in the Initiative that are not covered by the Act, and cumulative NNI funding since its inception in 2001 totals over $45 billion through the 2025 request.

The National Nanotechnology Initiative has released Strategic Plans in 2004, 2007, 2011, 2014, 2016, and 2021 that outline goals and "program component areas," as required under the terms of the Act. In addition, the NNI community developed an environmental health and safety research strategy in 2011, which was significantly updated in 2024. This work expanded the scope of study on the impacts of nanotechnology to include incidental nanomaterials of concern, such as micro and nanoplastics and materials created through the use of 3D printers.

The NNI annually prepares a Supplement to the President's Budget that summarize federal programmatic activities and address plans for the upcoming fiscal year. The Federal agencies with the largest investments are the National Institutes of Health, National Science Foundation, Department of Energy, Department of Defense, and the National Institute of Standards and Technology.

The NNI received support for emerging technologies during the first Trump administration, particularly in the foundational role that nanotechnology plays in the emergence of quantum information technologies, artificial intelligence, and semiconductors. However, under Trump administration leadership, the activity and impact of NNI activities were scaled back.

The Biden administration and new NNI leadership revitalized the nanotechnology community and interagency collaboration through a number of new programs, activities, and initiatives. In particular, they placed a special focus on clean energy and mitigating climate change through the Nano4EARTH challenge. They also expanded the NNI to recognize that nanotechnology has become pervasive in material, energy and biosystem related discoveries and applications. Other areas of interest included the study of micro and nanoplastics; ensuring greater accessibility and better networked user facilities; and strengthening and broadening interaction collaboration.

The areas of emphasis and leadership from the first Trump administration continued into the second Trump administration.

== Goals ==
The five goals of NNI are:

1. Ensure that the United States remains a world leader in nanotechnology research and development.
2. Promote commercialization of nanotechnology R&D.
3. Provide the infrastructure to sustainably support nanotechnology research, development, and deployment.
4. Engage the public and expand the nanotechnology workforce.
5. Ensure the responsible development of nanotechnology.

== Initiatives ==
Throughout the history of the National Nanotechnology Initiative, there have been a variety of programs and challenges aimed at aligning the field with the highest priorities of the nation.

=== National Nanotechnology Challenges ===
With the development of the most recent NNI Strategic Plan in 2021, the NNI created National Nanotechnology Challenges (NNC). The first NNC, Nano4EARTH, was announced by the White House Office of Science and Technology Policy (OSTP) on National Nanotechnology Day in 2022. Nano4EARTH was designed to mobilize the nanotechnology community to work across disciplines and stakeholder groups to accelerate the development, scale-up, and adoption of technologies to address challenges faced by the earth and its environment. The breadth and versatility of nanotechnology enable a unique opportunity to protect the earth and its environment, while increasing domestic energy efficiency. A two-day workshop identified four strategic areas of near-term opportunity: batteries and energy storage; catalysis; coatings, lubricants, membranes, and other interface technology; and capture of greenhouse gases. These topics have created a framework that has stimulated international discussion focused on the role nanotechnology and other emerging technologies can play in addressing climate and sustainability issues.

=== Examples of Previous Signature Initiatives and Grand Challenge Topics ===
- Water Sustainability through Nanotechnology – Nanoscale Solutions for a Global-Scale Challenge
- Nanotechnology for Sensors and Sensors for Nanotechnology – Improving and Protecting Health, Safety, and the Environment
- Sustainable Nanomanufacturing - Creating the Industries of the Future
- Nanoelectronics for 2020 and Beyond
- Nanotechnology for Solar Energy Collection and Conversion - Contributing to Energy Solutions for the Future
- Nanotechnology Knowledge Infrastructure - Enabling National Leadership in Sustainable Design
- Future Computing: Create a new type of computer that can proactively interpret and learn from data, solve unfamiliar problems using what it has learned, and operate with the energy efficiency of the human brain

== Participating Federal Agencies and Departments ==
Departments and agencies with nanotechnology R&D budgets:

- Consumer Product Safety Commission (CPSC)
- Department of Commerce (DOC)
  - Bureau of Industry and Security (BIS)
  - Economic Development Administration (EDA)
  - National Institute of Standards and Technology (NIST)
  - U.S. Patent and Trademark Office (USPTO)
- Department of Defense (DOD)
- Department of Energy (DOE)
- Department of Health and Human Services (DHHS)
  - Food and Drug Administration (FDA)
  - National Institutes of Health (NIH)
  - National Institute of Occupational Safety and Health (NIOSH)
- Department of Homeland Security (DHS)
- Department of Transportation (DOT)
  - Federal Highway Administration (FHWA)
- Environmental Protection Agency (EPA)
- National Aeronautics and Space Administration (NASA)
- National Science Foundation (NSF)
- U.S. Department of Agriculture (USDA)
  - Agricultural Research Services (ARS)
  - Forest Service (FS)
  - National Institute of Food and Agriculture (NIFA)

Other participating departments and agencies:

- Department of Education (DOEd)
- Department of the Interior
  - U.S. Geological Survey (USGS)
- Department of Justice (DOJ)
  - National Institute of Justice (NIJ)
- Department of Labor (DOL)
  - Occupation Safety and Health Administration (OSHA)
- Department of State (DOS)
- Department of the Treasury (DOTreas)
- Intelligence Community (IC)
- Nuclear Regulatory Commission (NRC)
- U.S. International Trade Commission (USITC)

== Governance ==
Established by the 21st Century Nanotechnology Research and Development Act (Pub. L. 108–153 (text) (PDF)), the National Nanotechnology Coordination Office (NNCO) conducts public engagement on behalf of the NNI and provides technical and administrative support to the Nanoscale Science, Engineering, and Technology Subcommittee of the National Science and Technology Council (NSTC) and the interagency nanotechnology community. NNCO activities include efforts to convene the nanotechnology community, share information on available resources and opportunities, engage with the public, excite students about nanotechnology, and share highlights and information about nanotechnology and the NNI. The NNCO Director also serves in the White House Office of Science and Technology Policy (OSTP).

Directors of the NNCO:

- Jim Murday, 2001-2003
- Clayton Teague, 2003-2011
- Robert Pohanka, 2012-2014
- Mark Meador, 2014-2016
- Lisa Friederdorf, 2016-2022
- Branden Brough, 2022-2025
- Quinn Spadola, 2025

== Impact ==
The NNI tracks annual federal investments through an Office of Management and Budget (OMB) data call, which is published in the NNI Supplement to the President's Budget. Through fiscal year 2025, the United States $45B into the field of nanotechnology through the NNI. These annual reports provide highlights of outcomes but comprehensive analysis is challenging because of the complex nonlinear path between initial investment and technical or economic outcomes. Furthermore, the field of nanotechnology is fundamental to many other areas of science and only loosely defined.

A small number of studies have attempted to evaluate the effects of the NNI objectively. A study of Corporate and University Nanotechnology patenting published in 2023, looked at patent grants since the launch of the NNI in 2000 through 2009 and maintenance events on those patents through 2021. US-invented nanopatents with US assignees, were somewhat more apt to renew at least once (14.5% vs. 11.7%) compared to the US -assignees on average, but somewhat less inclined to pay for full maintenance of 20 years from filing (40.5% vs. 52.5%). The lower propensity to renew could be attributed to a quickly changing technology-landscape.

The Executive Office of the President's National Science and Technology Council worked with the U.S. Census Bureau to add a specific code to the North American Industry Classification System (NAICS) for the purpose of classifying nanotechnology-related businesses. Data from the 2017 Economic Census revealed that over 3,700 companies – with over 171,000 employees – self-identified as primarily being in the business of Nanotechnology R&D. These companies reported $42 billion in revenue and $20 billion in employee salaries. Data from the 2022 Census showed that over 1,600 companies employing over 207,000 people earned over $44.5B in revenue under the Nanotechnology R&D classification.

An independent study by the Parnin Group focusing on the aggregated revenues of a select list of nanotechnology companies has estimated that the 2022 economic impact of nanotechnology on the U.S. economy was between $67 billion and $83 billion and close to a trillion dollars over the past two decades. According to the study, these numbers only represent a relatively small number of companies that are clearly classified as nanotechnology and ignores the field's critical supporting role in several large commercial sectors. The study pointed to the estimated $268 – 297 billion in 2022 from the closely related industry – microelectronics and semiconductors – to provide anecdotal evidence of the full magnitude of nanotechnology on the nation's economy.

Periodic evaluations of the NNI are conducted by the President's Council of Advisors on Science and Technology (PCAST) and the National Academies of Sciences, Engineering, and Medicine (NASEM). The most recent PCAST report in 2023 recommended an update to the legislation, expanded interagency collaboration, and focus on multidisciplinary experiential training. The most recent NASEM review in 2020 discussed the importance of the NNI within the context of international competitiveness.

The impact of the NNI was recognized through several events and activities that celebrated the 20th anniversary of the program. Most notably, in 2024 a symposium was held at the National Academies of Sciences, Engineering, and Medicine that featured congratulatory messages and forward-looking thoughts from government and industry leaders, as well as established and earlier career researchers. Moderated by NNCO Director, Branden Brough, notable participants included:

- President Joe Biden
- President Bill Clinton
- Senator Ron Wyden
- Arati Prabhakar, Assistant to the President for Science and Technology, Director of OSTP
- Neal Lane, Rice University, former Assistant to the President (Clinton) for Science and Technology and Director of OSTP
- Chad Mirkin, Northwestern University
- Kathleen Rubins, NASA Astronaut

== See also ==
- National Science and Technology Council
- President's Council of Advisors on Science and Technology
- Translational research
