= Kirstin Matthews =

American biochemist

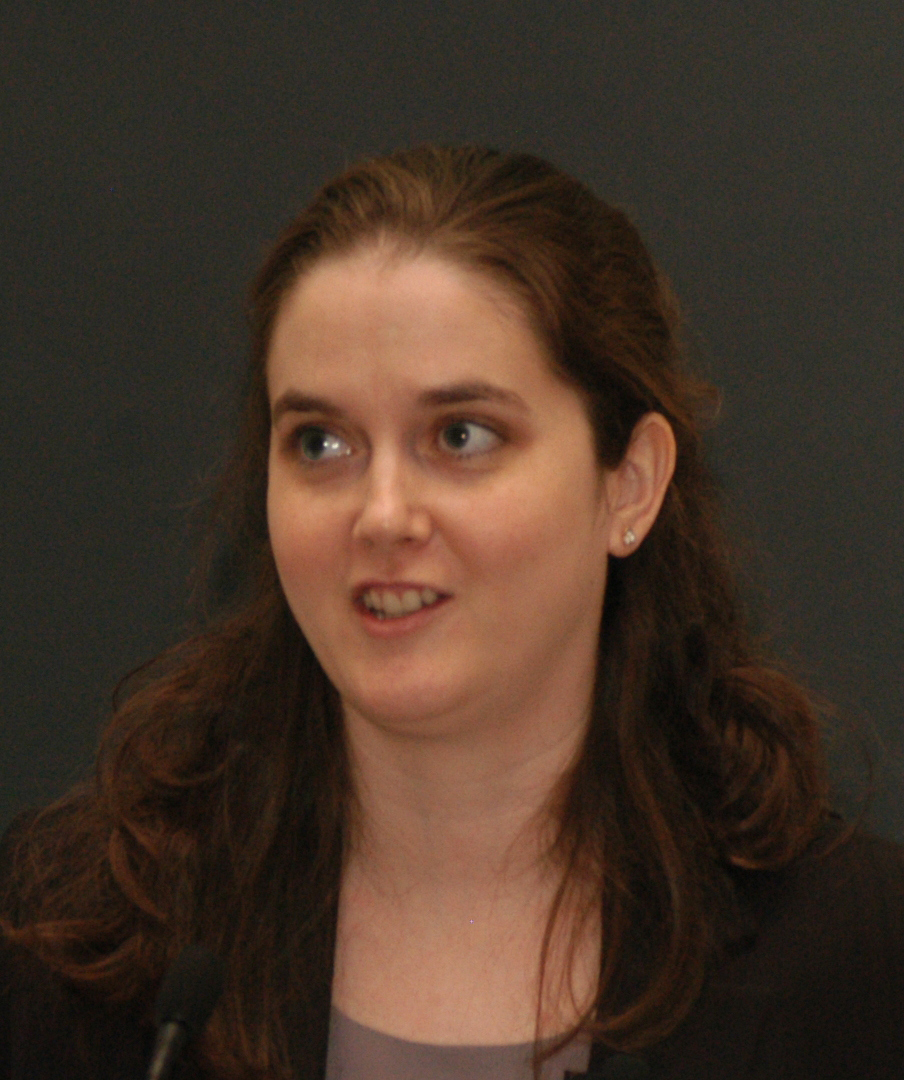
- Education: University of Texas at Austin, University of Texas Health Science Center
- Scientific career
- Fields: Biochemistry, molecular biology
- Workplaces: James A. Baker III Institute for Public Policy

Kirstin Matthews is a Fellow in Science and Technology Policy at the James A. Baker III Institute for Public Policy. Matthews received a bachelor's degree in biochemistry from the University of Texas at Austin and a PhD in molecular biology from the University of Texas Health Science Center. Matthews has published multiple policy recommendations pertaining to stem cell research, climate change, and health care.

== Education ==
In May of 1996 Kristin was given a B.A. in Biochemistry from The University of Texas at Austin. Which is the number 1 public university in Texas and top-40 in the world. With her growing interest in the sciences along with hard work and dedication she was then able to get her Ph.D. in Molecular Biology from The University of Texas Health Science Center in May of 2003. Her Ph.D. was given to her as a result of her paper titled “The Characterization of Mouse Carboxypeptidase N Small Subunit Gene Structure and the Expression of Complement C3 and Carboxypeptidase N in Mouse Development” under the supervision of Professor Dr. Rick A. Wetsel.

== Research ==
Matthews is a Fellow in Science and Technology Policy at the Baker Institute for Public Policy, which is located at Rice University in Houston, Texas. She conducts research on policy and ethical issues associated with emerging biotechnology such as regenerative medicine, vaccines and genomic research. She was the project director for the task force, Access to Health Care in Texas: Challenges of the Uninsured and Underinsured, from 2004 to 2006. The task force released a series of reports on the uninsured in the state title "Code Red".

Selected publications by Matthews include:

- International Stem Cell Collaboration: How Disparate Policies between the United States and the United Kingdom Impact Research (2011),
- Stem Cell Research in the Greater Middle East: The Importance of Establishing Policy and Ethics Interoperability to Foster International Collaborations (2010),
- Conference Report – Stem Cell Policy in the Obama Age: Texas, U.S. and U.K. Perspectives (2010),
- WANTED: Federal Stem Cell Research Oversight (2009),
- Stem Cell Science and Policy Overview (2009),
- Science and Technology: Recommendations for the Next Administration (2008),
- Human Embryonic Stem Cell Research: Recommendations for the Next Administration (2008),
- Conference Report – Beyond Science: The Economics and Politics of Responding to Climate Change (2008),
- Hot Topic: Stem Cell Controversy—Are Human Skin Cells Really the Breakthrough? (2007), and
- U.S. Stem Cell Policy – Unintended Consequences (2007).

Her work has been utilized by the National Institutes of Health and United States Congress in policymaking.

== Blog ==
In addition to doing research for the Baker Institute, Matthews also contributes to the Baker Institute Blog for the Houston Chronicle.

== Teaching ==
Matthews is a lecturer at Rice University. Her most recent courses include SOCI 314 – Science at Risk? Out of the Lab and into the Public Sphere (with Elaine Howard Ecklund) and NSCI 511 – Science Policy and Ethics.

== Membership ==
Matthews has served on the American Association for the Advancement of Science since 2003 and at the International Society for Stem Cell Research since 2007.

In 2010, Matthews was invited onto a national talk show to discuss stem cell policy hosted by Armstrong Williams.

== Sources ==
- Science and technology policy chron.com
- "Experts Directory". www.bakerinstitute.org.
- "Blog". Research!America.
- "The Baker Institute Science and Technology Program: Publications". www.ruf.rice.edu.
- Matthews Bio ruf.rice.edu
