= James F. Reda =

Compensation consultant and business founder

James F. Reda (born August 27, 1953, in Brooklyn, New York) is an executive compensation consultant, academic, author, as well as Founder and managing director of James F. Reda & Associates.

== Early Life and Military Service ==
James F. Reda (born August 27, 1953, in Brooklyn, New York) is an American executive compensation consultant, academic, and author. After finishing high school at age 16, Reda enlisted in the U.S. Navy and spent six years in the Navy's nuclear submarine program as a petty office. Following his active duty service, he joined the U.S. Coast Guard Reserve and eventually retired with the rank of lieutenant commander.

Reda pursued higher education after his military service. He earned a Bachelor of Science degree in industrial engineering from Columbia University in 1981 and later obtained a Master of Science in management from the MIT Sloan School of Management. These academic credentials laid the foundation for his subsequent career in business and consulting.

== Consulting career ==
Reda began his executive compensation consulting career in 1987 at The Bachelder Group, a prominent firm led by compensation attorney Joseph E. Bachelder III. He worked at The Bachelder Group for nine years, advising top management and corporate boards on executive pay and governance issues. In the late 1990s, Reda held senior consulting roles at major human resources and benefits firms – notably serving as a principal at Buck Consultants and as a senior manager at Arthur Andersen LLP, where he further developed his expertise in executive compensation and corporate governance.

In 2004, Reda founded his own advisory firm, James F. Reda & Associates, LLC, based in New York City . The firm provided independent executive compensation and corporate governance consulting services, assisting both publicly traded and private companies in designing pay programs, incentive plans, change-in- control arrangements, and other reward strategies. Under Reda's leadership, the firm gained a reputation for its proprietary research and high-quality advice, and in 2009 it was cited by a Conference Board task force as one of the top independent executive compensation consulting firms in the U.S.

In February 2011, Arthur J. Gallagher & Co., a global insurance brokerage and consulting company, acquired James F. Reda & Associates as part of its expansion into executive pay consulting. Following the acquisition, Reda and his team continued operating as a division of Gallagher's human resources and benefits consulting arm. Reda took on the role of managing director and Executive Compensation Practice Leader at Gallagher, where he oversees services related to executive pay strategy, incentive plan design, employment agreements, and corporate governance for clients nationwide. As of 2025, he has over 30 years of experience in the field and remains a senior leader in Gallagher's compensation consulting practice.

Throughout his consulting career, Reda has been recognized as an authority on executive compensation and corporate governance. He has testified before the United States Congress on issues of executive pay; in December 2007, he spoke to the House Committee on Oversight and Government Reform about the independence of compensation consultants and potential conflicts of interest in setting CEO pay <. Reda is frequently quoted in the financial media on CEO compensation trends and policies. For example, during the 2008 financial crisis he commented on proposed limits to banking executives’ bonuses, arguing that “Congress should nudge the free market, not bludgeon it” with overly harsh pay caps. He has provided expert commentary in outlets such as The New York Times, Forbes, and USA Today on topics ranging from pay-for-performance to Wall Street bonus practices.

Beyond client work and media commentary, Reda has contributed to professional organizations and academia in his field. He is a member of the National Association of Corporate Directors (NACD) and served as chair of the NACD's Atlanta chapter. In 2003, he was appointed to the NACD Blue Ribbon Commission on Executive Compensation, which issued influential guidelines on the role of board compensation committees. Reda also belongs to the New York Society of Security Analysts, where he has served on the Corporate Governance and Shareholder Rights Committee. In addition, he has been involved with his alma mater Columbia University, sitting on the Entrepreneurship Advisory Board of Columbia's engineering school since 2007 to mentor and support emerging business leaders.

== James F. Reda & Associates ==
Reda formed James F. Reda & Associates in 2004. The company provides corporate governance compensation advisory services including the creation, planning and implementation of base and total cash compensation programs to both public and private clients in the US. Reda and his colleagues regularly conduct economic studies on executive compensation.

In Feb. 2011, the company was purchased by the global insurance brokerage, Arthur J. Gallagher & Co. James F. Reda & Associates continues to operate as a division of Gallagher Benefits Services Inc.

== Publications and Research ==
=== Books ===
James F. Reda has written extensively on executive compensation matters. He has authored or co-authored over twenty articles in journals and industry publications, covering topics such as incentive plan design, stock option valuation, merger-related pay issues, and best practices for compensation committees. His articles have appeared in outlets like The Corporate Board, Directorship, Directors & Boards, the Journal of Deferred Compensation, and other professional journals. Reda's expertise and thought leadership are also reflected in several landmark research studies. He has been a lead author of annual Conference Board reports on CEO and executive compensation trends in the U.S., collaborating on analyses of pay practices and governance developments for large public companies.

•Pay to Win: How America's Successful Companies Pay Their Executives' – Harcourt Brace, 2000. ISBN 0156072009 . A book examining the compensation strategies of top-performing U.S. companies and how executive pay plans can drive business success.

•The Compensation Committee Handbook – John Wiley & Sons, 3rd edition 2007 (originally published 2001; 4th edition 2014) . Co-authored by James F. Reda, Stewart Reifler, and Laura G. Thatcher, this reference guide for corporate boards provides comprehensive advice on structuring and governing executive compensation programs in the post-Enron regulatory environment. (Third edition ISBN 0470171316.)

Both of these books are widely used by corporate directors, HR professionals, and researchers to understand best practices in executive compensation. Reda's Compensation Committee Handbook in particular has become an influential resource, with updated editions incorporating new regulations (such as the Dodd-Frank Act's provisions on say-on-pay) and evolving trends in pay governance.
