= Vivian Ho (academic) =

Health economist in the United States

Vivian Ho is the James A. Baker III Institute Chair in Health Economics, a professor in the Department of Economics at Rice University, and a professor at Baylor College of Medicine since 2004. Ho's research examines the effects of economic incentives and regulations on healthcare quality and costs. Her research has been published in economics, medical, and health services journals.

== Early life and education ==
Ho was born in Montreal, Canada, in 1963 and moved to Calgary, Alberta, at an early age. When she was six, her father took a job in Southern California.

After graduating from high school in Long Beach, California, Ho enrolled at Harvard University and earned her AB in economics cum laude. Following graduation, she attended the Australian National University and received a graduate diploma in Economics, passing with merit. Ho enrolled in Stanford University's Ph.D. program in economics in 1986 and graduated in 1992.

== Career ==
Following graduate school, Ho became an assistant professor at McGill University in the departments of Medicine and Economics. In 1996, she was an assistant professor of Economics and Management at Washington University in St. Louis. From 2000 to 2005, she worked as an assistant professor in the Department of Health Care Organization and Policy at the University of Alabama at Birmingham. She was also named the Center for Aging and Health Policy program director there. Ho has been at Rice University's James A. Baker III Institute for Public Policy since 2004 as the James A. Baker Chair in Health Economics.

== Research ==
Ho's research has been funded by the National Institutes of Health (NIH), the Agency for Healthcare Research and Quality, the American Cancer Society, Arnold Ventures and Health Care Service Corporation. She has been the principal investigator in 16 grants and a co-investigator in nine grants.

== Honors and service ==
In 2020, Ho was elected as a National Academy of Medicine member and currently serves as the Membership Chair for Section 11. She has served on the Board of Scientific Counselors for the National Center for Health Statistics and the NIH Health Services, Outcomes and Delivery study section. She is also a founding board member of the American Society for Health Economists and a member of the American Journal of Health Economics Editorial Board.

She was a board member of Community Health Choice for ten years and is a current member of the Blue Cross Blue Shield (Health Care Service Corporation) of Texas Community Advisory Board. She also serves on the Texas Employers for Affordable Health Care Advisory board and the Houston Business Coalition on Healthcare Advisory board.

== Personal life ==
Ho is married and has one son.
