= Chun Chia Lin =

American physicist

Chun Chia Lin is an American physicist.

Lin earned a bachelor's degree from the University of California, Berkeley, and completed a doctoral dissertation titled Selected Topics in Microwave Spectroscopy under the direction of John Hasbrouck Van Vleck at Harvard University.

Lin began his teaching career at the University of Oklahoma in 1955, and joined the University of Wisconsin–Madison in 1968. At UW–Madison he held the John and Abigail Van Vleck Professorship of Physics. In 1965, Lin was elected a fellow of the American Physical Society. The APS subsequently awarded Lin the 1996 Will Allis Prize for the Study of Ionized Gases. Upon retirement, UW–Madison granted Lin emeritus status. Lin is a member of the University of Oklahoma's Department of Physics and Astronomy Board of Visitors. In 2016, Lin and the Avenir Foundation funded the construction of a new academic building and research laboratory at the University of Oklahoma. Construction on Lin Hall was completed in 2018.
