= National Science and Technology Council =

American government council

Agency overview
- Formed: November 23, 1993
- Headquarters: 725 17th Street, Washington, D.C.
- Agency executive: President of the United States, Chair
- Parent agency: Executive Office of the President

The National Science and Technology Council (NSTC) is a council in the Executive Branch of the United States. It is designed to coordinate science and technology policy across the federal government's executive branch.

== History ==
The National Science and Technology Council (NSTC) was established by President Bill Clinton through Executive Order 12881 on November 23, 1993. Each presidential administration has utilized the NSTC in varying ways. During the Clinton administration, the NSTC prepared six Presidential Review Directives, which informed subsequent presidential directives. The council has not issued any of these since. Instead, the council's recommendations often serve as advice for other committees as policy is drafted.

The structure of the NSTC has changed multiple times in the last few decades. Under the Obama administration, the Council's subcommittees were restructured, and a new committee for directing STEM education was added.

== Mission ==
The primary functions of the NSTC are:

1. to coordinate the science and technology policy-making process;
2. to ensure science and technology policy decisions and programs are consistent with the President's stated goals;
3. to help integrate the President's science and technology policy agenda across the federal government;
4. to ensure science and technology are considered in development and implementation of federal policies and programs; and
5. to further international cooperation in science and technology.

Another objective of the NSTC is the establishment of clear national goals for federal science and technology investments in virtually all the mission areas of the executive branch. The Council prepares research and development strategies that are coordinated across federal agencies to form investment packages aimed at accomplishing multiple national goals. While a fundamental mission of the NSTC is to further the President's scientific policies, it also has been directly and indirectly charged by Congress to coordinate activities in several federal projects. These include combating ocean acidification, overseeing the National Nanotechnology Program, and supporting STEM education.

== Committees ==
The structure of the NSTC is periodically reorganized by each presidential administration to reflect its science and technology priorities. As a result, the number, names, and responsibilities of committees, subcommittees, and working groups change over time.

== Committee membership ==
The NSTC is chaired by the President. The rest of the NSTC membership is made up of Cabinet Secretaries and Agency Heads with significant science and technology responsibilities, and other White House officials and advisors where necessary. The NSTC is supported by the Office of Science and Technology Policy (OSTP), which manages the council's day-to-day operations and coordinates its activities with participating federal agencies on behalf of the President. The Assistant to the President for Science and Technology (APST) typically serves as the Director of OSTP. The specific officials responsible for managing the NSTC vary by presidential administration. The president and cabinet-level officials are rarely present at meetings of the NSTC. Therefore, NSTC activities are carried out by OSTP and NSTC staff in collaboration with federal agency staff. Federal agencies assign staff to the NSTC, and their numbers have ranged from 5 to 21 members in previous years.

== Member agencies ==
Membership varies by presidential administration but generally includes departments and agencies with significant science and technology responsibilities. Agencies that have been represented in the NSTC include:

- Department of Agriculture
- DARPA
- Department of Commerce — National Institute of Standards and Technology (NIST)
- Department of Commerce — National Oceanic and Atmospheric Administration (NOAA)
- Department of Commerce — United States Patent and Trademark Office (USPTO)
- Department of Defense
- Department of Education
- Department of Health and Human Services — National Institutes of Health (NIH)
- Department of Homeland Security
- Department of the Interior
- Department of Labor
- Department of State
- Department of Transportation
- Environmental Protection Agency
- U.S. Food and Drug Administration
- National Security Agency
- National Science Foundation
- NASA
- Office of the Director of National Intelligence — Intelligence Advanced Research Projects Activity (IARPA)
- Office of Management and Budget
- Smithsonian Institution

== Funding ==
As the NSTC does not receive direct appropriations, member agencies contribute funding to the projects that the NSTC oversees. Historically, participating agencies have provided funding and personnel to support NSTC activities rather than the council receiving a large independent appropriation. Funding levels have varied by fiscal year and presidential administration. These funds support multi-agency projects.

== See also ==
- Office of Science and Technology Policy (OSTP)
- President's Council of Advisors on Science and Technology (PCAST)
- Networking and Information Technology Research and Development
- National Nanotechnology Initiative
