= Nick Sinai =

Adjunct faculty and a senior in the Obama Administration

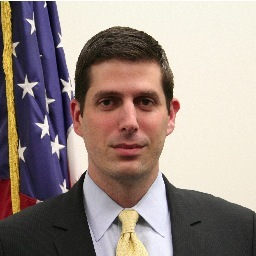

Deputy Chief Technology Officer of the United States Under Todd Park
- In office January 2013 – December 2014
- President: Barack Obama
- Succeeded by: Ryan Panchadsaram

Energy and Environment Director, Federal Communications Commission
- In office August 2009 – December 2010
- President: Barack Obama

Personal details
- Education: Harvard University; University of Chicago

Nick Sinai is a venture capitalist, adjunct faculty at Harvard Kennedy School, author, and a former senior official in the Obama Administration.

Nick Sinai was the Deputy Chief Technology Officer of the United States. He assumed this role under the second Chief Technology Officer of the United States, Todd Park, and continued under Megan Smith. Sinai was formerly a senior advisor to Park as well as to the first U.S. CTO, Aneesh Chopra, starting in 2010.

Sinai was a volunteer on the Hillary Clinton 2016 presidential campaign and was selected to the leadership team of her Tech and Innovation transition team. During the campaign, he contributed to the Hillary for America policy proposal on technology and innovation and a policy memo on transforming procurement.

Sinai is a regular contributor to the TV Show Government Matters, and has been quoted in the Wall Street Journal and the Economist.

== Harvard Kennedy School ==
As Adjunct Lecturer in Public Policy at the John F. Kennedy School of Government at Harvard University, he teaches a class on policy implementation. Previously, he designed and taught the field class “Technology and Innovation in Government.” His students learned user-centered design, prototyping, user-testing, and how to hack bureaucracies with empathy to get stuff done.

Sinai was the inaugural Walter Shorenstein Media and Democracy Fellow at the Shorenstein Center on Media, Politics and Public Policy at the Harvard Kennedy School, where he focused on data as public infrastructure and the media, policy, and economic implications of providing greater public access to government data. Sinai is currently a senior fellow at the Belfer Center for Science and International Affairs, as part of the Technology and Public Purpose Project, and was previously a faculty affiliate of the Shorenstein Center.

At the Belfer Center, Sinai has written about Improving Veterans’ Digital Experience Across Presidential Administrations, Human-Centered Policymaking, and Modernizing the Regulatory State. Sinai co-authored a 2017 Harvard Business School case about the U.S. Digital Service, a Politico op-ed on digital government, and is a regular blogger about modernizing government.

Sinai is a faculty mentor to the Harvard Open Data Project, a group of over 40 Harvard College students showcasing uses of Harvard University data—including predicting the results of the undergraduate student government election. He is an advisor to Coding It Forward, a non-profit by and for early-career technologists creating new opportunities into public interest technology, including the Civic Digital Fellowship, a summer fellowship program for early-career technologists, designers, and product managers to innovate in the federal government. Since its founding in 2017, Coding It Forward has hosted over 300 Fellows as part of the Fellowship across 12 federal agencies.

== U.S. Digital Corps ==
Sinai co-founded the U.S. Digital Corps, with Chris Kuang and Caitlin Gandhi. The U.S. Digital Corps, a two-year federal fellowship for early career technologists, was launched in August 2021 by the Biden administration, in a collaboration between the General Services Administration (GSA), the White House Office of Management and Budget, the Office of Personnel Management, the Cybersecurity and Infrastructure Security Agency, and the White House Office of Science and Technology Policy. It is a cross‑government fellowship opportunity operated by the GSA's Technology Transformation Services (TTS).

== Insight Venture Partners ==
Sinai is a senior advisor and Venture Partner at Insight Venture Partners. Founded in 1995, Insight Venture Partners has raised more than $30 billion in capital commitments, including $9.5 billion in its Fund XI in 2020. Insight has invested in more than 400 companies since its inception.

Sinai joined Insight in late 2014. He is a board member at Rebellion Defense, LeoLabs, HawkEye 360, and BrightBytes and helped invest in Virgin Pulse and Recorded Future.

== Deputy Chief Technology Officer of the United States ==
As U.S. Deputy CTO, Sinai led President Obama's Open Data Initiatives to liberate data to fuel innovation and economic growth. A prominent advocate and frequent speaker for Open Data, he has said “government data is a valuable asset and should be available wherever possible” and that data “should be thought of as infrastructure." He contributed to President Obama's Executive Order 13642, the re-launch of Data.gov, Project Open Data, the U.S. Digital Services Playbook, the G8 Open Data Charter, the White House Big Data report, and the U.S. Open Data Action Plan.

Sinai led Administration efforts to give Americans easier access to their own data and to advance the idea that Americans deserve secure access to their own healthcare (Blue Button), energy, student loan, tax, and other personal data in machine-readable formats. He launched the White House's Green Button Initiative, a public-private effort to provide electricity customers online access to their own energy usage data.

He led the Open Government Initiative and developed the second U.S. Open Government Plan, to ensure that the federal government is more transparent, participatory, and collaborative. Improvements underway as part of the plan include greater fiscal transparency, opening up the We the People online petition platform, and improving service for Freedom of Information Act (FOIA) requests. Sinai was part of the U.S. delegation at the Open Government Partnership Head of State event, where President Obama unveiled new transparency commitments to improve accessibility to federal financial data, improve federal digital services, strengthen patient privacy in the health care system, and develop a federal open source software policy.

Sinai also helped start and grow the Presidential Innovation Fellows program, which brings tech-savvy entrepreneurs into the federal government for year-long "tours of duty", with a particular focus on data innovation projects. He also contributed to the launch and growth of U.S. Digital Service, including co-authoring part of the Digital Services Playbook. In January 2017, with less than an hour left in office, President Obama signed the TALENT Act, bipartisan legislation that made the Presidential Innovation Fellows Program a permanent part of the Federal government. Sinai's role in the legislation and the details of the dramatic signing was captured in a WIRED piece entitled “The Race to Pass Obama’s Last Law and Save Tech in DC.”

Sinai also played a key role in developing the Administration's $4.5B grid modernization strategy to build a smarter and more secure electric grid, and helped develop President Obama's ConnectED initiative to bring fast broadband and digital learning to 99% of students.

== National Broadband Plan ==
Prior to the White House, Sinai served at the Federal Communications Commission, where he helped draft the National Broadband Plan. The plan included recommendations that the U.S. should modernize the electrical grid, improve the energy efficiency of the IT industry, and unleash “energy innovation in homes and buildings by making energy data readily accessible by consumers.” In 2009, Congressman Ed Markey introduced legislation, the Electric Consumer Right to Know Act (e-KNOW Act), H.R.5696, in the 111th Congress (2009–2010), based on the policy recommendations in the National Broadband Plan. President Obama also put forth a recommendation in the National Broadband Plan that “Congress should make clear that state, regional and local governments can build broadband networks” as a policy proposal in the build up to his 2015 State of the Union.

== Earlier career ==
Sinai was a venture capitalist at Polaris Partners and Lehman Brothers Venture Partners (now Tenaya Capital). At Polaris, he invested in LogMeIn, a company that went public in 2009. He also served in executive and advisory roles with two Boston area start-up technology companies, and served as a senior advisor to the Massachusetts Clean Energy Center.

Sinai earned an M.B.A from the University of Chicago Booth School of Business, and an A.B. from Harvard University.

== Works and Publications ==
- Marina Nitze and Nick Sinai. “Hack Your Bureaucracy: Get Things Done No Matter What Your Role on any Team” Hachette. 2022.
- Nick Sinai. "U.S. Digital Corps Expands Government Expertise." Belfer Center Newsletter, Belfer Center for Science and International Affairs, Harvard Kennedy School, Fall 2021.
- Nick Sinai, David Leftwich, Kelly O’Connor, and Alex Lohr. “Improving Veterans’ Digital Experience Across Presidential Administrations” Belfer Center for Science and International Affairs, Harvard Kennedy School, August 2020.
- Nick Sinai, David Leftwich, Ben McGuire. “Human-Centered Policymaking” Belfer Center for Science and International Affairs, Harvard Kennedy School, April 2020.
- Alisha Ukani and Nick Sinai “Data, Not Documents: Modernizing the Regulatory State” Belfer Center for Science and International Affairs, Harvard Kennedy School, March 2019.
- Mitchell Weiss, Nick Sinai, and Michael Norris. "U.S. Digital Service." Harvard Business School Case 817-032, December 2016.
- Omnibus Broadband Initiative. “Connecting America: The National Broadband Plan"
