= National Science Board =

Governing body of the National Science Foundation

National Science Board, NSF
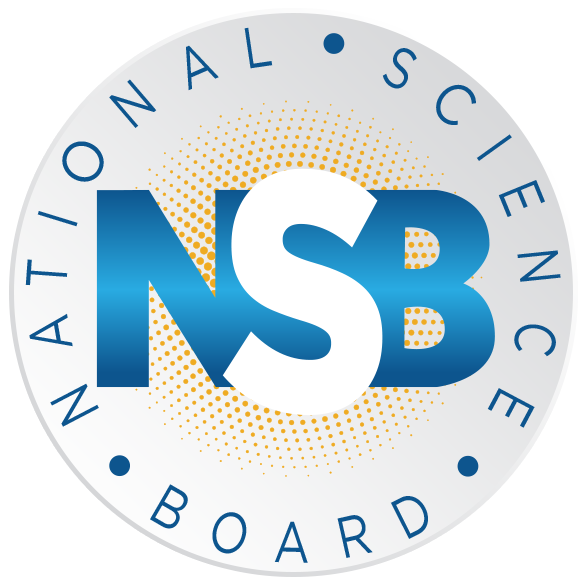

Agency overview
- Formed: May 10, 1950; 76 years ago
- Headquarters: Alexandria, Virginia
- Motto: Where Discoveries Begin
- Website: www.nsf.gov/nsb

The National Science Board (NSB) of the United States establishes the policies of the National Science Foundation (NSF) within the framework of applicable national policies set forth by the president and Congress. The NSB also serves as an independent policy advisory body to the president and Congress on science and engineering research and education issues. The Board has a statutory obligation to "...render to the President and to the Congress reports on specific, individual policy matters related to science and engineering and education in science and engineering, as Congress or the President determines the need for such reports," (e.g., Science and Engineering Indicators; Report to Congress on Mid-scale Instrumentation at the National Science Foundation). All board members are presidential appointees. NSF's director serves as an ex officio 25th member and is appointed by the president and confirmed by the U.S. Senate.

The NSB was established through an act of Congress, and can officially be dissolved only by Congress. However, on April 25, 2026, the entire board was terminated by President Donald Trump via email, effective immediately. Normally, appointees serve staggered six-year terms.

== Mission statement ==
The Board's mission statement states: "Supporting education and research across all fields of science and technology and America's investment in the future."

== Background ==
The National Science Board was created through the National Science Foundation Act of 1950:

There is established in the executive branch of the Government an independent agency to be known as the National Science Foundation (hereinafter referred to as the "Foundation"). The Foundation shall consist of a National Science Board (hereinafter referred to as the "Board") and a Director.

As an independent federal agency, NSF does not fall within a cabinet department. Rather, NSF's activities are guided by the National Science Board. The Board was established by Congress to serve as a national science policy body and to oversee and guide NSF's activities. It has dual responsibilities to: a) provide independent national science policy advice to the president and the Congress; and b) establish policies for NSF.

The Board meets five times per year to review and approve major NSF awards and new programs, provide policy direction to NSF, and address significant science- and engineering-related national policy issues. It initiates and conducts studies and reports on a broad range of policy topics, and publishes policy papers or statements on issues of importance to U.S. science and engineering research and education enterprises. The Board identifies issues that are critical to NSF's future, and approves NSF's strategic plan and the annual budget submission to the Office of Management and Budget (OMB). Specifically, the Board analyzes NSF's budget to ensure progress and alignment with NSF's strategic direction, and to maintain a balance between new investments and core programs.

On April 25, 2026, the entire board was terminated by President Donald Trump, effective immediately. According to Keivan Stassun, the termination emails were sent with boilerplate text with no reason provided.

== Composition ==
The president appoints 24 members of the National Science Board for six-year terms. The NSF director serves as the 25th member ex officio. Every two years, one-third (eight) of the members rotate off the Board and eight new members are appointed (or occasionally re-appointed) to serve a six-year term. Board member nominations are based on distinguished service and eminence in research, education, and/or public service. Members are drawn from academia and industry and represent a diverse range of science, technology, engineering, and education disciplines and geographic areas.

=== Former members ===
The most recent notable members of NSB before the April 2026 firing of the entire board were:

- Roger N. Beachy – Professor Emeritus of Biology, Washington University in St. Louis
- Heather A. Wilson – President, University of Texas, El Paso and former member of the United States House of Representatives
- Dorota Grejner-Brzezinska – Vice Chancellor for Research, University of Wisconsin–Madison
- Victor R. McCrary – NSB Vice Chair; Vice President for Research and Graduate Programs, University of the District of Columbia
- Julia M. Phillips – Executive Emeritus, Sandia National Laboratories
- Keivan Stassun – Stevenson chair in Physics & Astronomy, Vanderbilt University
- Bevlee Watford – Professor of Engineering Education, Associate Dean for Equity and Engagement, Virginia Polytechnic Institute and State University
- Yolanda Gil – Fellow and Research Professor Information Sciences Institute, University of Southern California
- Juan E. Gilbert – Andrew Banks Family Preeminence Endowed Professor; University of Florida Distinguished Professor; Chair of the Computer & Information Science & Engineering Department, University of Florida
- Joan Ferrini-Mundy – President, University of Maine
- Willie E. May – Vice President for Research and Economic Development, Morgan State University
- Ryan Panchadsaram – Advisor, Kleiner Perkins

== Work ==
The Board has two overarching roles: 1) Provide oversight and policy guidance to the National Science Foundation; and 2) Serve as an advisor to Congress and the president on matters concerning science and engineering in the U.S.

=== Committees ===
The National Science Board generally conducts its work through its committees. By statute, the Board has an Executive Committee and other committees. Specifically, the NSF Act of 1950, as amended, authorizes the board "to appoint from among its members such committees as it deems necessary, and to assign to committees so appointed such survey and advisory functions as the Board deems appropriate...."

Note: NSB Chair, NSB Vice Chair, and NSF Director are Members ex officio of all committees.

==== Standing committees ====
- Executive Committee (EC)
- Committee on Oversight (CO)
- Committee on External Engagement (EE)
- Committee on Awards and Facilities (A&F)
- Committee on National Science and Engineering Policy (SEP)
- Committee on Strategy (CS)

=== Science & Engineering Indicators (SEI) ===
Science and Engineering Indicators (Indicators) provides high-quality quantitative information on the U.S. and international science and engineering (S&E) enterprise. Indicators include detailed thematic or focus-area reports, a state data tool, and a congressionally mandated biennial report delivered to the president and Congress that highlights important trends across the focus areas. Indicators reports employ a variety of presentation styles—such as narrative text, data tables, and figures—to provide accessible data to consumers with different information needs.

The data described in the Indicators are a quantitative summary of the scope, quality, and vitality of the S&E enterprise over time and within a global context. These data are intended to contribute to understanding the current environment and inform the development of future policies. The reports do not model the dynamics of the S&E enterprise nor forecast future outcomes. Also, Indicators are factual and policy-neutral. It does not offer policy options nor make policy recommendations. The National Science Board authors one or more companion pieces that draw on the data in Indicators to offer recommendations related to national S&E research or education policy, in keeping with the Board's statutory responsibility to bring attention to such issues.

Indicators are prepared under the guidance of the National Science Board by the National Center for Science and Engineering Statistics (NCSES), a principal federal statistical agency within the National Science Foundation (NSF), Social, Behavioral, and Economic Sciences Directorate. NCSES develops the content and the dissemination platforms. Indicators reports are subject to extensive review by internal and external subject matter experts, federal agencies, National Science Board members, and NCSES statistical reviewers for accuracy, coverage, and balance.

== Honorary awards ==
Each year, the Board honors achievement and public service in science, engineering, and technology through its two honorary awards, the Vannevar Bush Award and the NSB Science and Society Award (Formerly the NSB Public Service Award).

Awards are presented during a ceremony held near the NSF headquarters. Several hundred members of the science and education communities—including White House, congressional, scientific society, higher education, and industry officials gather to celebrate the achievements of those awarded during this event.

The Vannevar Bush Award recognizes lifetime contributions to science and public service. This award was created in 1980 by the NSB in memory of Vannevar Bush, who was involved in the creation of the National Science Foundation. The criteria for a candidate to be considered for this award are to be a U.S. citizen and meet two of the three selection criteria: Intellectual Merit, Public Service to the Nation, and Societal Benefits.

The NSB Science and Society Award (previously known as the Public Service Award) recognizes those who foster public understanding of science and engineering. This award was created in November 1996. Candidates can be individuals or groups who have made significant contributions to public understanding of engineering and science.

== See also ==
- The White House
- Office of Science and Technology Policy
- House Committee on Science, Space, and Technology
- Senate Committee on Commerce, Science, and Transportation
