= Doerte Blume =

American physicist

- Education: Georg-August-Universität Göttingen BS, PhD
- Awards: Fellow of the American Physical Society
- Scientific career
- Workplaces: Washington State University, University of Oklahoma
- Doctoral advisor: K. Birgitta Whaley, Jan Peter Toennies

Doerte Blume is a Professor of Physics at University of Oklahoma doing research in the area of cold atom and few-body physics.

== Biography ==
Blume completed her undergraduate and obtained a PhD in 1998 from Georg-August-Universität Göttingen, Germany. Her PhD was supervised by Jan Peter Toennies and K. Birgitta Whaley. This included research done at University of California, Berkeley. Following this she completed a post-doc at JILA, University of Colorado Boulder.

== Research ==
Blume conducts research into sub-atomic particles at Washington State University.

In 2022 she obtained a $1million grant from the W. M. Keck Foundation to investigate quantum synchronization.

== Honors and awards ==
- 2006 - Washington State University College of Sciences Young Faculty Performance Award
- 2010 - Fellow of the American Physical Society for "contributions to physics of weakly-bound quantum clusters and strongly-interacting degenerate Fermi gases in one dimension."
- 2014 - Washington State University College of Arts and Sciences Mid-Career Achievement in Scholarship/Creative Activities Award
- 2016 - Meyer Distinguished Professorship at Washington State University
- 2025 - George Lynn Cross Professorship
- Bush Lectureship at the University of Oklahoma

== Publications ==
- Granger, Brian E.; Blume, D. (April 2, 2004). "Tuning the Interactions of Spin-Polarized Fermions Using Quasi-One-Dimensional Confinement". Physical Review Letters. 92 (13) 133202. arXiv:cond-mat/0307358. doi:10.1103/PhysRevLett.92.133202. PMID 15089607. S2CID 15320087.
- Kunitski, Maksim; Zeller, Stefan; Voigtsberger, Jörg; Kalinin, Anton; Schmidt, Lothar Ph. H.; Schöffler, Markus; Czasch, Achim; Schöllkopf, Wieland; Grisenti, Robert E.; Jahnke, Till; Blume, Dörte; Dörner, Reinhard (May 2015). "Observation of the Efimov state of the helium trimer". Science. 348 (6234): 551–555. arXiv:1512.02036. doi:10.1126/science.aaa5601. PMID 25931554. S2CID 102090236.
- Blume, D.; Greene, Chris H. (May 4, 2001). "Quantum corrections to the ground-state energy of a trapped Bose-Einstein condensate: A diffusion Monte Carlo calculation". Physical Review A. 63 (6) 063601. arXiv:cond-mat/0009220. doi:10.1103/PhysRevA.63.063601. S2CID 118991102.
- Blume, Dörte; Lewerenz, Marius; Huisken, Friedrich; Kaloudis, Michael (November 15, 1996). "Vibrational frequency shift of HF in helium clusters: Quantum simulation and experiment". The Journal of Chemical Physics. 105 (19): 8666–8683. doi:10.1063/1.472648.
