= Jose Morey =

Puerto Rican physician

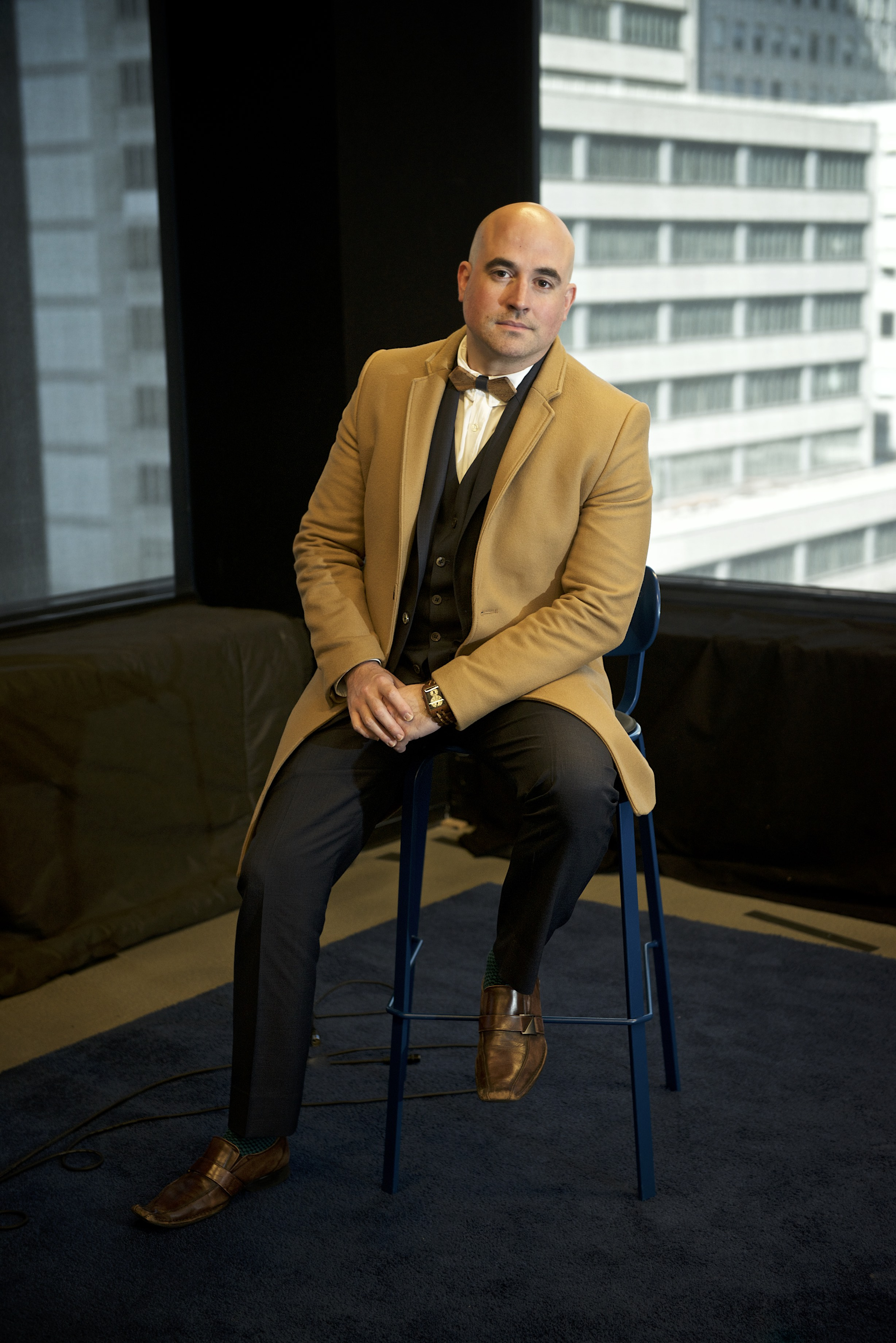
- Morey at SXSW 2025
- Born: May 24, 1980 (age 46)
- Education: University of South Florida Morsani College of Medicine; Johns Hopkins School of Medicine; University of Pennsylvania
- Occupation: Physician
- Employer: Ad Astra Media
- Known for: Intergalactic doctor
- Website: drjosemorey.com

Jose Morey is a Puerto Rican physician. He is the founder and chief executive officer of Ad Astra Media. He is known as an intergalactic doctor. Previously, he served as an associate professor of radiology and internal medicine at Eastern Virginia Medical School.

== Early life and education ==
Morey was born into a Puerto Rican family.

He received his medical degree from the University of South Florida Morsani College of Medicine. Later, he studied at Johns Hopkins School of Medicine. He did his fellowship from the University of Pennsylvania.

== Career ==
Morey began his career as a radiologist in Eastern Virginia. Later, he joined University of Virginia’s radiology department as an assistant professor of radiology and biomedical imaging. He has also served as a director of informatics for Medical Center Radiologists in Virginia Beach, Virginia.

Morey has served as chief medical innovation officer of Liberty BioSecurity. He has also served as an advisor to MIT Solve and NASA iTech. He formerly was an associate chief health officer for IBM Watson.

Morey is on the board with the Medical Society of Virginia and appointed Director as of 2023, and features as a guest speaker, the Informatics Leadership Council of the American College of Radiology, Virginia Chapter, and Virginia Health Information (VHI). He is on the advisory boards for MIT Solve, a platform for social impact, and MIT Ideas, a yearly social impact competition for MIT students, SciTech, a nonprofit for aerospace research, and the National STEM Honor Society. Further boards Morey features on include: SOMOS Inc., Immertec, Predictiv Care, Cemvita Factory, MaaPaa Organization, and the WHRO Board of Directors. He is a cofounder and currently sits as Chief Health Officer of Ever Medical Technologies; and, in 2021, helped to launch Ever Healthcare, their online medical outreach platform, in Thailand.

Morey is an advisor for NASA iTech, developing technologies and AI to be used towards the 2030 Mars Mission and the NASA Space Breathing Initiative. He has directed international teams of engineers to develop a database with NASA and NetApp for rapid COVID-19 response measures, now integrated into the US National Emergency Broadcast System. They have programmed AI to determine the best medical procedures in combatting and treating COVID-19. Morey has also served as a representative of the Polish Space Agency.

Morey has served as an advisor to the Director of the White House Office of Science and Technology on their Kaggle CORD19 Project, in collaboration with high-ranking research universities, foundations, Microsoft, and the National Library of Medicine (NLM). Morey aided these parties in the development of an AI platform to analyze material on the Coronavirus family and COVID-19 pandemic.

In 2021, his novel, LatinX Business Success, co-authored with Frank Carbajal (president of Es Tiempo LLC), was released by Wiley Publishing.

Morey is an Eisenhower Fellow with the 2020-2021 Zhi-Xing Fellows Program. He is also a faculty member of the Singularity University. He is known as the first intergalactic doctor, and in 2019, Morey founded and became CEO of Ad Astra Media LLC in Virginia.

== Publications ==
- The Future Shock of Medicine: How AI will Transform Disease, Death and Doctors
- Biofilms-Impacts on Human Health and Its Relevance to Space Travel
- Machine Learning in Radiology: Applications Beyond Image Interpretation
- Radiology's Emerging Role in 3-D Printing Applications in Health Care
- Latinx Business Success: How Latinx Ingenuity, Innovation, and Tenacity are Driving Some of the World's Biggest Companies
