= Coding it Forward =

American non-profit organization

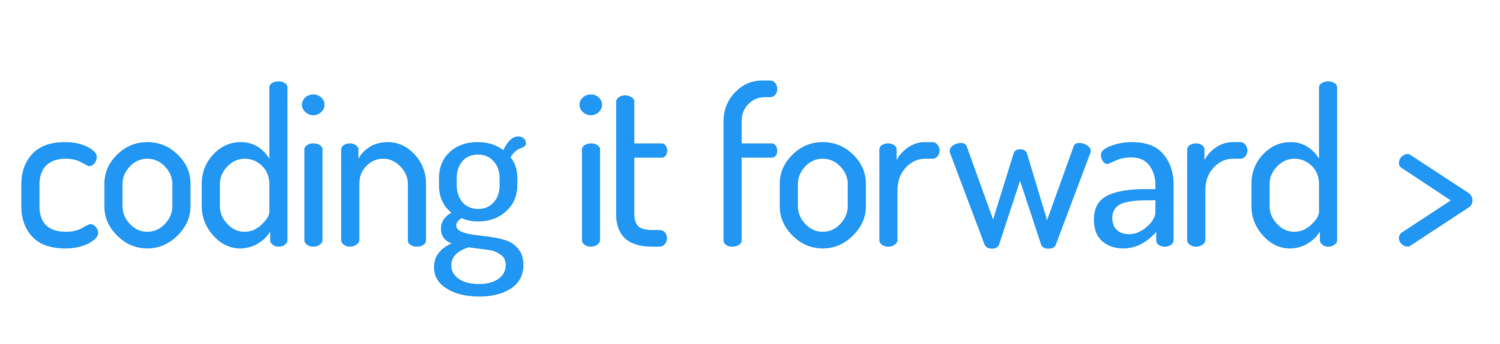
- Founded: January 2017
- Founders: Athena Kan, Chris Kuang, Rachel Dodell, and Neel Mehta
- Registration no.: 82-1825067
- Purpose: empowering computer science, data science, and design students to create social good by breaking down the barriers to entry in social impact spaces
- Headquarters: Cambridge, MA
- Website: codingitforward.com

Coding it Forward is an American 501c3 non-profit organization with the goal of building a talent pipeline into civic tech, primarily through creating and marketing data science and technology internships in federal government agencies for undergraduate and graduate students at colleges and universities across the United States.

== History ==
Several Harvard University students were inspired by former Chief Technology Officer of the United States Megan Smith's appeal for technologists to work in public service at the annual Grace Hopper Celebration of Women in Computing. They started a blog highlighting how students were contributing to civic tech, which grew to 800 members within two months. Two of the students took a course with the former Deputy Chief Technology Officer of the United States Nick Sinai where they had the opportunity to work on tech projects in government. That experience led to the idea of organizing tech-focused student internships in government.

== Civic Digital Fellowship ==
The primary program of Coding it Forward is their Civic Digital Fellowship, a competitive 10-week data science and technology internship program for undergraduate and graduate students in United States federal agencies. They have received more than 1,100 applications from students from more than 175 colleges and universities for 50 fellowship positions. Among six federal agencies, the 50 students learn by working on group projects to improve their departments and how they work. The fellows receive a paycheck, which is unlike many other internship programs in the government.

=== Growth ===
Year	Fellows	Applications	Agencies	Agency Names
2017	14	226	1	U.S. Census Bureau
2018	36	≈900	6	U.S. Department of Veterans Affairs, U.S. Department of Health and Human Services, U.S. Department of State, U.S. Census Bureau, International Trade Administration and General Services Administration
2019	55	≈1,000	6	U.S. Census Bureau, Bureau of Labor Statistics, U.S. Department of Health and Human Services, U.S. Citizenship and Immigration Services, General Services Administration, National Institutes of Health

== Recognition ==
Co-founders Athena Kan and Chris Kuang gave the closing keynote at the 2018 Code for America Summit in Oakland, CA, in front of an audience of 1,200 civic technologists (Video of Keynote).

== Funders ==
The organization has received support from philanthropic sources such as the Chan Zuckerberg Initiative, the Knight Foundation, and the Shuttleworth Foundation.
