= Shannon Blunt =

American radar engineer

Shannon D. Blunt
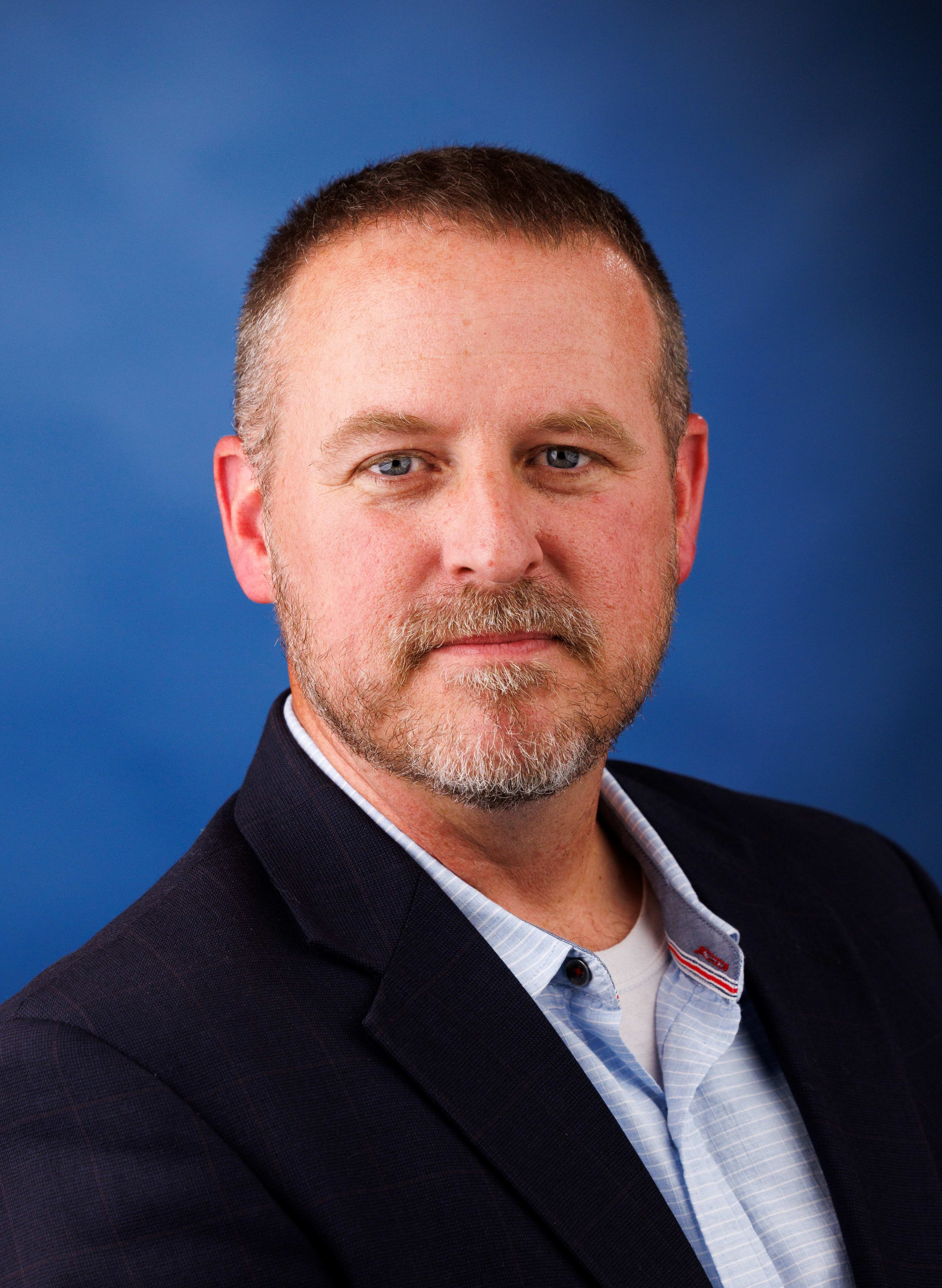
- Education: University of Missouri
- Scientific career
- Fields: Radar Signal Processing, Radar Systems Engineering
- Workplaces: University of Kansas
- Website: https://eecs.ku.edu/shannon-blunt

Shannon D. Blunt is an American radar engineer and the Roy A. Roberts Distinguished Professor of Electrical Engineering & Computer Science at the University of Kansas (KU) in Lawrence, KS. He is Director of the KU Radar Systems & Remote Sensing Lab (RSL) and the Kansas Applied Research Lab (KARL).

== Education and career ==
Blunt grew up in New Madrid, Missouri, and was one of five valedictorians in the class of 1994 at New Madrid County Central High School. He then received B.S., M.S., and PhD degrees in electrical engineering from the University of Missouri in 1999, 2000, and 2002. From 2002 to 2005 he worked as a radar engineer in the Radar Division of the U.S. Naval Research Laboratory (NRL) in Washington, DC, joining the University of Kansas in 2005. His research interests are in sensor signal processing and system design with a particular emphasis on waveform diversity and spectrum sharing techniques, having made a variety of contributions that have been deployed in operational radar and sonar systems.

== Research contributions ==
With a focus on the intersection between theoretical signal processing and radar systems engineering, Blunt has led the development of numerous radar research contributions, with many of these being experimentally demonstrated using open-air measurements. Some noteworthy examples, many of which are patented/patent-pending, include:

- Development of the reiterative minimum mean-square error (RMMSE) framework, which has led to experimental demonstrations of adaptive pulse compression (APC), deconfliction of radar/radar spectrum sharing, fast-time radar clutter cancellation, magnetoencephalography (MEG) brain imaging, and passive direction finding.
- Development of the polyphase-coded frequency modulation (PCFM) implementation that converts arbitrary polyphase radar codes, which suffer significant distortion in high-power transmitters due to abrupt phase changes, into continuous phase waveforms that are amenable to operational systems. This code-to-waveform mapping provides a linkage that enables optimization of physically-realizable signals, including subsequent hardware effects.
- Development of a class of spectrally-shaped random frequency modulated (RFM) radar waveforms that have been experimentally demonstrated for moving target indication (MTI). Because they do not repeat during the radar's coherent processing interval (CPI), their nonrepeating structure realizes a multiplicative increase in dimensionality relative to traditional repeated operation.
- Development and experimental demonstration of distinct forms of dual-function radar/communications based on spatial, frequency, and coding degrees of freedom.
- Development of a radar sense-and-notch formulation of cognitive radar using RFM waveforms that was experimentally demonstrated to enable MTI operation while performing determination of in-band interference and subsequent on-the-fly spectrally-notched waveform generation at a 4 kHz update rate. This demonstration was part of the SDRadar program led by the Army Research Laboratory.
- Development of an RFM form of complementary waveforms and joint mismatched filter receive processing, with each experimentally demonstrated to realize significant range sidelobe cancellation.
- Proposed the notion of range sidelobe modulation (RSM) of clutter that results from changing radar waveforms during the CPI, followed by experimental demonstration of various methods to compensate for the resulting degradation that occurs in MTI operation.
- Co-editor of the 2010 book Principles of Waveform Diversity & Design and the 2018 book Radar & Communication Spectrum Sharing, both the first book on their respective topics.

== Awards and honors ==
In 2008 Blunt received a Young Investigator Program (YIP) award from the Air Force Office of Scientific Research (AFOSR) to investigate radar-embedded communications. In 2012 he received the Fred Nathanson Memorial Radar Award from the Aerospace & Electronic Systems Society of the Institute of Electrical and Electronics Engineers (IEEE) for contributions to adaptive radar signal processing and waveform diversity. In 2016 he was named a Fellow of the IEEE for contributions to radar waveform diversity and design. In 2020 he received the IET Premium Award for a 2018 paper published in the IET Radar, Sonar & Navigation journal involving the practical realization of cognitive sense-and-notch radar operation. In 2021 he was short-listed for the IET A.F. Harvey Prize in radar & microwave engineering. In 2024 he was named a Fellow of the Military Sensing Symposia (MSS) for contributions to national defense and civilian applications of radar waveform diversity and design. In 2025 he received the IEEE/AESS Warren D. White Award for fundamental and practical contributions to radar waveform design for advanced radar systems. Also in 2025 he was an inaugural inductee into the University of Missouri EECS Alumni Hall of Fame.

== Professional service ==
Blunt has served the engineering profession in a variety of different capacities. From 2008-2020 he served on the Radar Systems Panel of the IEEE Aerospace & Electronic Systems Society, where he was Chair of the Conferences Committee from 2012-2018 and Panel Chair from 2018-2020. Since 2008 he has been on the Editorial Board for IET Radar, Sonar & Navigation and in 2022 was the senior editor for Radar Systems for IEEE Transactions on Aerospace & Electronic Systems. In October 2022, he became the Founding Editor-in-Chief for the IEEE Transactions on Radar Systems. He served as General Chair of the 2011 IEEE Radar Conferences in Kansas City, MO, and Technical Chair for the 2018, 2022, and 2023 IEEE Radar Conference in Oklahoma City, OK, New York City, NY, and San Antonio, TX.

He chaired the NATO SET-179 research task group (RTG) on Dynamic Waveform Diversity & Design, and participated in the NATO RTGs SET-182 on Radar Spectrum Engineering & Management and SET-227 on Cognitive Radar.

He has also held multiple advisory positions to the U.S. government, including serving as a subject matter expert (SME) on spectrum issues to DARPA, the Air Force Research Laboratory, the Office of the Undersecretary of Defense for Research & Engineering (OUSD(R&E)), and the White House Office of Science & Technology Policy (OSTP). From 2019-2021 he served on the U.S. President's Council of Advisors for Science & Technology (PCAST) and well as being an OSTP SME for America's Mid-Band Initiative (AMBIT) to enable nationwide 5G deployment.
