= National Science Foundation CAREER Award =

NSF program recognizing younger faculty

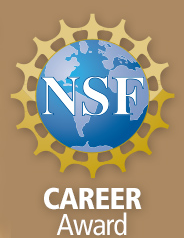

The National Science Foundation CAREER award is an award presented by the National Science Foundation (NSF) of the United States Federal Government to support junior faculty who exemplify the role of teacher-scholars through research and education, and the integration of these endeavors in the context of their organizations' missions. The awards, presented once each year, include a federal grant of minimum $400,000 for research and education activities for five-year period. On 30 May 2025, the Trump administration requested a budget that eliminated the CAREER award.

== History ==
The Presidential Young Investigators (PYI) program was initiated in 1983 during the presidency of Ronald Reagan, and remained active until the NSF New Young Investigators (NYI) program replaced it in 1992. Both programs were research-oriented and funded an average of 200 faculty members per year. Another, more selective program began in 1992, when the White House asked NSF to institute the Presidential Faculty Fellows (PFF) program. It awarded young faculty up to $100,000 per year for five years, with no matching-fund option, and put more emphasis on education and outreach. In 1994, the Faculty Early Career Development (CAREER) program was approved by NSF's National Science Board, and the first awards were presented in FY 1995. Several existing NSF programs and their objectives were merged into CAREER.

In 1996, the Presidential Early Career Awards for Scientists and Engineers (PECASE) program was instituted, replacing the PFF Awards. NSF PECASE recipients receive no additional funding. Beginning in FY 1997, the NSF selected nominees from among the "most meritorious first-year CAREER awardees supported by the CAREER program." The same year, the CAREER program announcement termed CAREER "a premier program."
