= Vilas Dhar =

Nonprofit executive

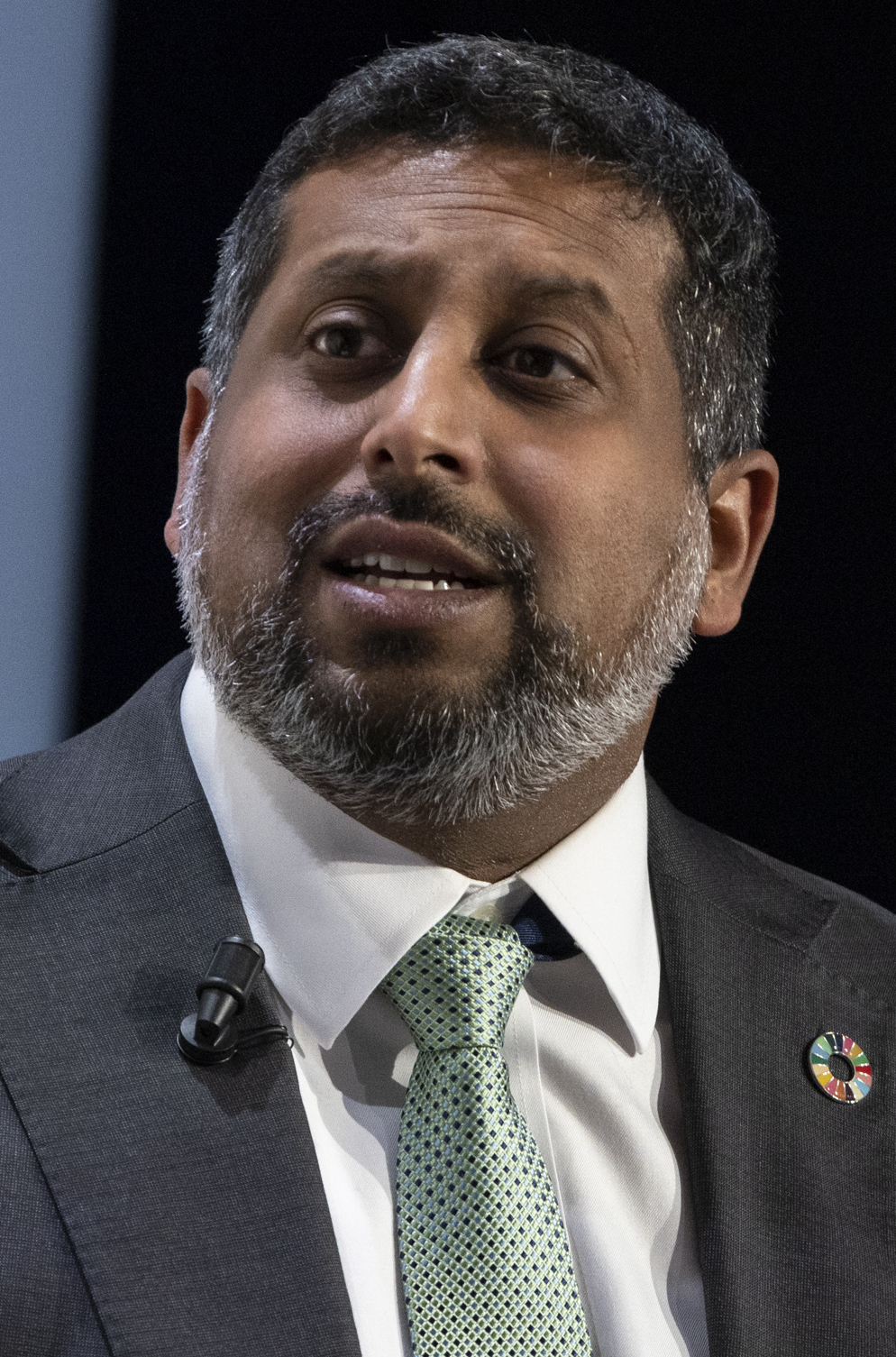
- Dhar at the World Economic Forum, 2023
- Education: University of Illinois Urbana–Champaign (BA, Biomedical Engineering; BS, Computer Science); New York University School of Law (JD); Harvard Kennedy School (MPA); University of Birmingham (doctoral research)
- Occupations: Chief executive, lawyer, global AI policy advisor
- Known for: President of the Patrick J. McGovern Foundation; leadership in artificial intelligence governance, philanthropy, and global policy
- Awards: Member, United Nations Secretary-General’s High-Level Advisory Body on Artificial Intelligence; World Economic Forum Young Global Leader (2022)
- Website: www.mcgovern.org/about-president-vilas-s-dhar/

Vilas Dhar is a global expert on artificial intelligence policy and a technology and philanthropy executive. He is President of the Patrick J. McGovern Foundation, a philanthropy focused on artificial intelligence for public purpose. Raised in rural Illinois, Dhar trained as a computer scientist and lawyer. In October 2023, he was appointed by United Nations Secretary-General António Guterres to the UN High-Level Advisory Body on Artificial Intelligence. He has written on artificial intelligence governance and public agency for publications including Time, The Boston Globe, Nature, and U.S. News & World Report.

== Education and career ==
Dhar holds bachelor's degrees in Biomedical Engineering and Computer Science from the University of Illinois Urbana-Champaign. He has a J.D. from the New York University's School of Law as well as a Master's in Public Administration from the Harvard Kennedy School of Government. He was a Gleitsman Fellow on Social Change at Harvard University.

Dhar began his career as an artificial intelligence researcher.

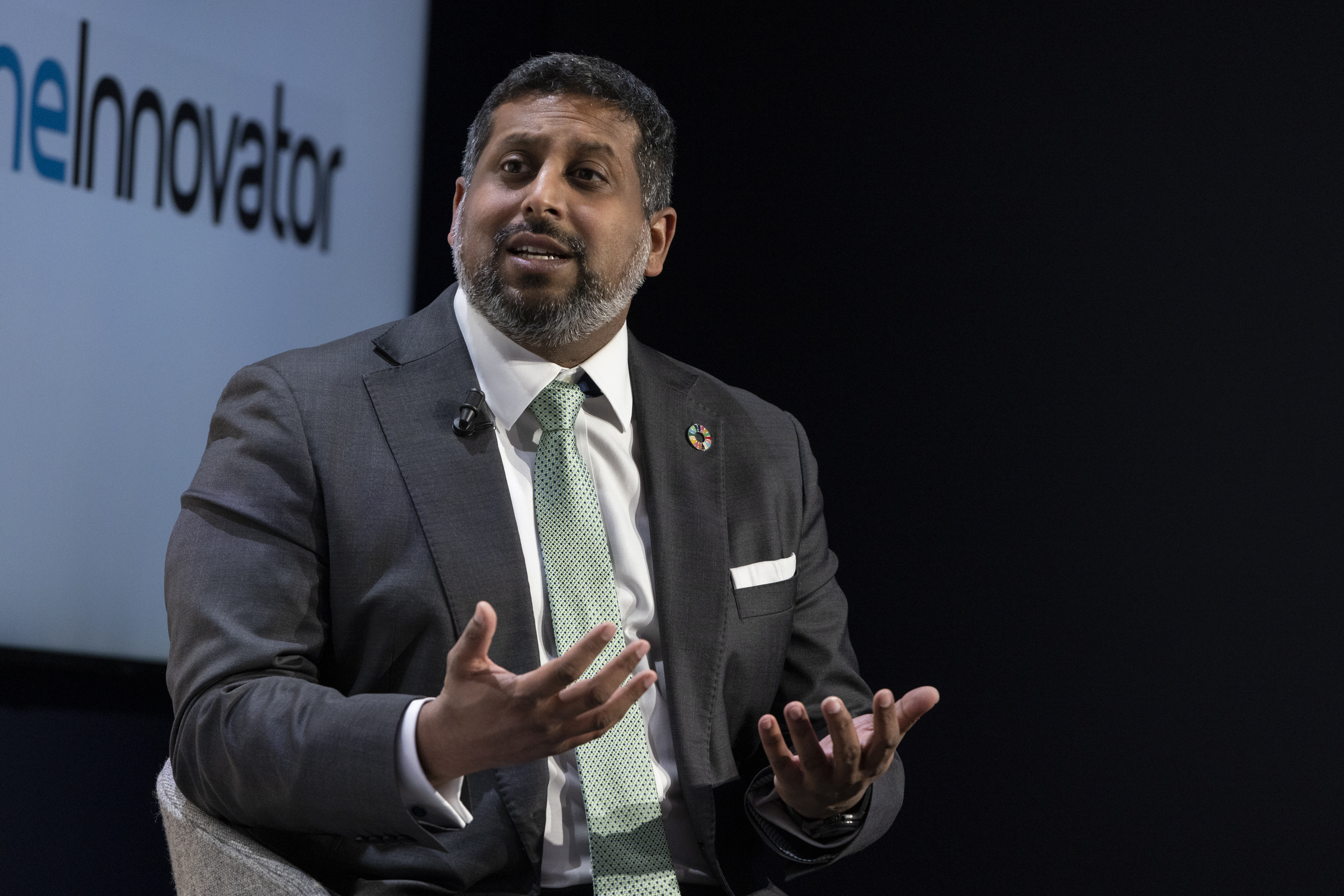
Vilas Dhar at the 2023 World Economic Forum (52692509532)

He was the Managing Partner at Dhar Law LLP and a founder of the Next Mile Project prior to joining the McGovern Foundation. Dhar is an advisor to MIT Solve. He serves as a Trustee of the Christensen Fund. He is an expert contributor to OECD.AI. Dhar is co-chair of the Global AI Action Alliance at the World Economic Forum along with Arvind Krishna, the chairman and CEO of IBM. He was named a Young Global Leader by the World Economic Forum in 2022. He serves as an observer to the Global Partnership on AI.

He is a Senior Fellow of the Berggruen Institute. He has also served as a Practitioner Resident on Artificial Intelligence at the Rockefeller Foundation's Bellagio Center in Lake Como, Italy Dhar is a Director of the New England International Donors.

Dhar serves on the Advisory Council at the Stanford Institute for Human-Centered Artificial Intelligence. He is on the Board of Directors at Access Lex Institute.

== Work ==
Dhar advocates the creation of values-based technology and a human-centric, tech-enabled future. He has been quoted in various media outlets including The Washington Post, NBC News, Time Magazine, and The Wall Street Journal, among others.

He has addressed the World Economic Forum in Davos and the United Nations General Assembly.

Dhar and Julia Dhar (née Julia Fetherston) wrote about 'impact investing' for the Harvard Business Review. They write that millennial investors will be the ones who "make or break" impact investing. The authors note that millennials "represent a sizeable, well-capitalized cohort of investors with a generational commitment to furthering the social good and a desire to engage their peers — and parents — in doing likewise."

== Personal life ==
He is married to Julia Dhar (née Fetherston), a managing director at Boston Consulting Group.

He grew up in rural Illinois and attended University Laboratory High School.
