= Alexander Macgillivray =

U.S. government official and technology executive

Alexander Macgillivray is an American technology executive and government official.

He served as a technology executive in both the Obama and Biden White Houses as Deputy Chief Technology Officer.

== White House CTO ==
Macgillivray was appointed the Deputy Chief Technology Officer (CTO) and deputy director in both the Biden and Obama White House Offices of Science and Technology Policy. The Obama White House was the first to have a CTO function, where Macgillivray led national technology prioritization alongside the inaugural U.S. CTO, Megan Smith

In these roles he oversaw federal technology policy on matters ranging from AI, to privacy, to internet accessibility.

== Free Speech at Twitter ==
Before his government appointments, Macgillivray was the general counsel at Twitter, where he publicly championed the platform as a critical public venue for free speech. He described Twitter as the "free speech wing of the free speech party." He stepped down from this role in 2013 to join the Biden White House.

== Background ==
He is on the board of the Electronic Freedom Foundation (EFF).

He went to college at Princeton and law school at Harvard.
