= Phil Venables =

Phil Venables may refer to:

- Philip Venables, British composer
- Phil Venables (computer scientist), chief information security officer at Google Cloud
