= Maxine Savitz =

American scientist

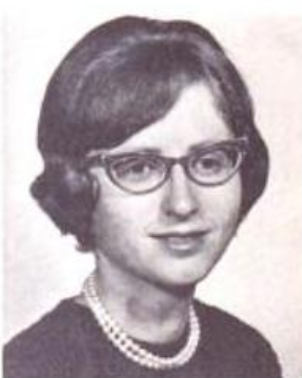
Maxine Savitz, from a 1966 publication of the United States Army

Maxine L. Savitz is the vice president of the National Academy of Engineering, and holds a Ph.D in organic chemistry. She has more than 30 years of experience as a manager for research, development and implementation programs in both the public and private sectors. She had been a member of the President's Council of Advisors on Science and Technology (PCAST) from 2009 to 2016.

== Early life and education ==
Savitz received her BA in chemistry from the Bryn Mawr College, and then completed her Ph.D. at the Massachusetts Institute of Technology. She then went on to do a postdoctoral fellowship at the University of California at Berkeley.

== Career ==
Until 1979, Savitz was a program manager for the Research Applied to National Needs at the National Science Foundation. She then took on the position as deputy assistant secretary for conservation at the US Department of Energy (DOE) and remained there until 1983. From 1987 until 2000, she was general manager of AlliedSignal. She retired as general manager for Technology Partnerships at Honeywell, Inc., formally known as AlliedSignal. From 1997 to 2000, Savitz was a serving member of the California Council on Science and Technology (CCST). She has served on various boards over the years, such as the American Council for an Energy-Efficient Economy, Federation of American Scientists, the National Science Board, Secretary of Energy Advisory Board, Electric Power Research Institute (EPRI), Defense Science Board, the Energy Foundation, as well as Draper Laboratory. She is also a member of the advisory body for Pacific Northwest National Laboratory, Sandia National Laboratories, and Jet Propulsion Laboratories.

She had been a member of the PCAST from 2009 to 2016, and is currently a member and vice president of the National Academy of Engineering.

== Awards ==
Savitz received the MERDC Commander Award for Scientific Excellence in 1967. In 1975 and 1979 she was recognized by the Engineering News-Record for Contribution to the Construction Industry. In 1980, she was awarded the President's Meritorious Rank. In 1981, she received the DOE Outstanding Service Medal, and in 1998 she was awarded the Orton Memorial Lecturer Award from the American Ceramic Society.

Savitz has also written more than 20 publications.
