= Francesco Paesani =

Theoretical chemist

- Citizenship: Italian; American
- Education: University of Rome "La Sapienza"
- Known for: Many-Body Molecular Dynamics
- Scientific career
- Fields: Theoretical Chemistry, computational chemistry, materials, biophysics
- Workplaces: University of California, San Diego
- Academic advisors: Birgitta Whaley (postdoc); Gregory Voth (postdoc)
- Website: https://paesanigroup.ucsd.edu/

Francesco Paesani is a theoretical chemist at the University of California, San Diego. He is also affiliated with the San Diego Supercomputer Center and Halicioǧlu Data Science Institute. As of 2026, he serves as the Chair for the American Chemical Society Division of Physical Chemistry.

== Education ==
He received his Ph.D. in Theoretical chemistry at the Sapienza University of Rome in 2000. He was a postdoctoral fellow at the University of California, Berkeley, working with Birgitta Whaley, and at the University of Utah, working with Gregory Voth.

== Research ==
=== Many-Body Molecular Dynamics ===
Paesani's most recognized works are for his data-driven many-body energy (MB-nrg) models, such as the MB-pol water model. These models are trained on high-level quantum mechanical calculations, deconstructing the energy in terms of the individual contributions.

== Honors and awards ==
- National Science Foundation CAREER Award, 2015
- American Chemical Society Early Career Award, 2016
- Cozzarelli Prize, 2020
- Fellow of the American Physical Society, 2024
