= Deirdre Mulligan =

American law professor

- Deirdre Mulligan in 2026
- Education: Smith College (B.A., 1988); Georgetown University Law Center (J.D., 1994)
- Scientific career
- Fields: Technology policy Privacy law
- Workplaces: University of California, Berkeley

Deirdre K. Mulligan is a professor of law specializing in privacy and technology at the University of California, Berkeley in the School of Information.

She served as Principal Deputy US Chief Technology Officer in the White House Office of Science and Technology Policy (OSTP) from 2023 to 2024.

In 2016, Mulligan and co-author Kenneth Bamberger received the International Association of Privacy Professionals Leadership Award for their book Privacy on the Ground.

== Academic career and advocacy ==
Mulligan's research focuses on the legal and technical means to protect privacy and public interest in the design of technology. She was the founding Director of the Samuelson Law, Technology and Public Policy Clinic at the Berkeley Law School, and as of February 2026, she is one of the faculty co-directors of the Berkeley Center for Law and Technology.

After obtaining her JD, Mulligan worked with the Electronic Frontier Foundation before being one of the founding staff at the Center for Democracy and Technology in 1994. She became a professor at UC Berkeley in 2001.

Her 2015 co-authored book Privacy on the Ground investigated the development of corporate management of privacy at a large scale, comparing cases across companies and countries. The book examines how privacy laws are embedded in practice, and the kind of factors that promote corporate cultures emphasizing privacy. They argued that Chief Privacy Officers (CPOs) with boundary-spanning roles are key to accomplish these goals. According to the study, CPOs should mediate "between external privacy demands and internal corporate privacy practices – translating the uncertain and dynamic requirements of privacy as shaped by regulators, advocates, consumers, and peers into corporate strategy and practice" and have access to corporate management and boards.

Mulligan has held several policy counsel positions and has regularly testified to government bodies on issues related to privacy. As of December 2025, she is sitting on the California Innovation Council.

== Selected publications ==
- Mulligan, Deirdre K. (2004). "Reasonable Expectations in Electronic Communications: A Critical Perspective on the Electronic Communications Privacy Act". George Washington Law Review.
- Mulligan, Deirdre K.; King, Jennifer (2011). "Bridging the Gap between Privacy and Design". University of Pennsylvania Journal of Constitutional Law.
- Mulligan, Deirdre K.; Schneider, Fred B. (Fall 2011). "Doctrine for Cybersecurity." , Dædalus, the Journal of the American Academy of Arts & Sciences : 140 (4)
- Bamberger, Kenneth A.; Mulligan,Deirdre K. (2011). "Privacy on the Books and on the Ground." Stanford Law Review : 247-315.
- Mulligan, Deirdre K.; Kroll, Joshua A.; Kohli, Nitin; Wong, Richmond Y. (2019-11-07). "This Thing Called Fairness: Disciplinary Confusion Realizing a Value in Technology". Proc. ACM Hum.-Comput. Interact. 3 (CSCW): 119:1–119:36. DOI: https://doi.org/10.1145/3359221
- Mulligan, Deirdre K.; Bamberger, Kenneth A. (2021). "Allocating Responsibility in Content Moderation: A Functional Framework". Berkeley Technology Law Journal. DOI: https://doi.org/10.15779/Z383B5W872
