= President's Council of Advisors on Science and Technology =

White House advisory board

Agency overview
- Formed: September 30, 2001
- Preceding agency: President's Science Advisory Committee
- Headquarters: New Executive Office Building 725 17th Street NW, Washington, D.C.
- Agency executives: David O. Sacks, co-chair; Michael Kratsios, co-chair
- Parent agency: Office of Science and Technology Policy
- Website: www.whitehouse.gov/presidential-actions/2025/01/presidents-council-of-advisors-on-science-and-technology/

The President's Council of Advisors on Science and Technology (PCAST) is a council, chartered (or re-chartered) in each administration with a broad mandate to advise the president of the United States on science and technology.

The current PCAST was established by Executive Order 13226 on September 30, 2001, by George W. Bush, was re-chartered by Barack Obama's April 21, 2010, Executive Order 13539, by Donald Trump's October 22, 2019, Executive Order 13895, by Joe Biden's February 1, 2021, Executive Order 14007 and by Donald Trump again on January 23, 2025, with Executive Order 14177.

== History ==
The council follows a tradition of presidential advisory panels focused on science and technology that dates back to President Franklin D. Roosevelt's Science Advisory Board, continued by President Harry Truman. Renamed the President's Science Advisory Committee (PSAC) by Dwight Eisenhower, it was disbanded by President Richard Nixon.

Reagan science advisor Jay Keyworth re-established a smaller "White House Science Council" It reported, however, to him, not directly to the president. Renamed PCAST, and reporting directly to the president, a new council was chartered by President George H. W. Bush in 1990, enabling the president to receive advice directly from the private and academic sectors on technology, scientific research priorities, and mathematics and science education.

== Mission ==
The President's Council of Advisors on Science and Technology mission is to provide advice to the president and the Executive Office of the President. PCAST makes policy recommendations in areas such as understanding of science, technology, and innovation. PCAST is administered by the Office of Science and Technology Policy (OSTP).

Recent PCAST reports have addressed antibiotic resistance, education technology (with a focus on MOOCs), cybersecurity, climate change, networking and information technology, and agricultural preparedness, among many others.

== Members and structure ==
PCAST has been enlarged since its inception and currently consists of 24 members and three co-chairs. The council members, distinguished individuals appointed by the president, are drawn from industry, education, research institutions, and other NGOs. The council is administered by an executive director.

=== PCAST membership under President Trump's second term ===
On January 23, 2025, President Trump issued an executive order reestablishing the PCAST co-chaired by David Sacks and Michael Kratsios. Additional members, announced on March 23, 2026, include:

- Marc Andreessen, co-founder and general partner at Andreessen Horowitz
- Sergey Brin, co-founder of Google and its parent company, Alphabet Inc.
- Safra Catz, executive vice chair of Oracle
- Michael Dell, founder and CEO of Dell
- Jacob DeWitte, founder of Oklo
- Fred Ehrsam, co-founder of Coinbase and Paradigm
- Larry Ellison, co-founder, executive chair, and CTO of Oracle
- David Friedberg, angel investor
- Jensen Huang, founder, former president and CEO of Nvidia
- John M. Martinis, quantum physicist and professor at the University of California, Santa Barbara
- Bob Mumgaard, co-founder and CEO of Commonwealth Fusion Systems
- Lisa Su, president and CEO of AMD
- Mark Zuckerberg, co-founder, CEO, and chair of Facebook and its parent company, Meta Platforms

=== PCAST membership under President Biden ===
On February 1, 2021, less than a month into his presidency, President Biden issued an executive order reestablishing the PCAST. He had already announced the 3 co-chairs Frances Arnold, Maria Zuber, and Eric Lander before his swearing-in in January 2021. He announced an initial roster of 27 additional members on September 22, 2021.

As of January 2023, there were 3 co-chairs: Frances Arnold, Maria Zuber, and Arati Prabhakar. There are 25 additional members:

- Dan Arvizu, Chancellor of the New Mexico State University
- Dennis Assanis, Chancellor of University of California, Santa Barbara
- John Banovetz, Executive Vice President at 3M
- Frances Colón, Senior Director, International Climate at the Center for American Progress
- Lisa Cooper, internal medicine and public health physician, and the Bloomberg Distinguished Professor of Equity in Health and Healthcare at Johns Hopkins University
- John Dabiri, Centennial Chair Professor at the California Institute of Technology
- Bill Dally, Chief Scientist and Senior Vice President for Research at Nvidia
- Sue Desmond-Hellmann, former Chief Executive Officer of the Bill & Melinda Gates Foundation
- Inez Fung, Professor of atmospheric science at the University of California, Berkeley
- Andrea Goldsmith, Dean of Engineering and Applied Science at Princeton University
- Laura Greene, physics professor at Florida State University and Chief Scientist at the National High Magnetic Field Laboratory
- Paula T. Hammond, David H. Koch Professor in Engineering and the Head of the Department of Chemical Engineering at the Massachusetts Institute of Technology
- Eric Horvitz, Chief Scientific Officer at Microsoft
- Joe Kiani, Chairman and CEO at Masimo
- Jonathan Levin, Dean at Stanford Graduate School of Business
- Stephen W. Pacala, Frederick D. Petrie Professor in the Department of Ecology and Evolutionary Biology at Princeton University
- Saul Perlmutter, U.S. astrophysicist at the Lawrence Berkeley National Laboratory and a professor of physics at the University of California, Berkeley
- William H. Press, Leslie Surginer Professor of Computer Science and Integrative Biology at the University of Texas at Austin
- Jennifer Richeson, Philip R. Allen Professor of Psychology and Director of the Social Perception and Communication Lab at Yale University
- Vicki Sato, retired Professor of Management Practice at Harvard Business School
- Lisa Su, Chair and CEO of Advanced Micro Devices
- Kathryn D. Sullivan, former NASA Astronaut
- Terence Tao, Professor & The James and Carol Collins Chair in the College of Letters and Sciences at University of California, Los Angeles
- Phil Venables, Chief Information Security Officer at Google Cloud
- Catherine Woteki, Visiting Distinguished Institute Professor in the Biocomplexity Institute at the University of Virginia and Professor of Food Science and Human Nutrition at Iowa State University

Former members include:

- Eric Lander, co-chair, serving concurrently as director of the Office of Science and Technology Policy, who resigned from the Biden administration in February 2022 after a workplace bullying scandal
- Francis Collins, acting co-chair, former director of the National Institutes of Health, who served from February to October 2022 between the resignation of Lander and the swearing in of Prabhakar
- Marvin Adams, member, nuclear engineer and computational physicist, who resigned from the council in April 2022 after being confirmed as a deputy administrator of the National Nuclear Security Administration
- Ash Carter, member, Director of the Belfer Center for Science & International Affairs at Harvard Kennedy School and 25th United States Secretary of Defense, who served until his death in October 2022
- Penny Pritzker, member, Chairman of PSP Partners, who served through December 2022

=== PCAST membership under President Trump's first term ===
On October 22, 2019, after a record 33 months since President Obama's PCAST held its final meeting, the Trump administration issued an executive order reestablishing the PCAST, appointing its first seven members:

- Catherine Bessant, the chief operations and technology officer at Bank of America
- Shannon Blunt, a professor of electrical engineering and computer science at the University of Kansas
- Dario Gil, an electrical engineer and computer scientist, as well as the director IBM Research
- Robert Iger, CEO of the Walt Disney Company
- Dorota Grejner-Brzezinska, a professor of engineering at Ohio State University, as well as associate dean for research
- Sharon Hrynkow, chief scientific officer at Cylo Therapeutics, Inc., a biotechnology company that focuses on research around rare diseases
- Herbert Fisk Johnson III, the CEO of S. C. Johnson & Son
- Abraham (Avi) Loeb, a professor of physics at Harvard University, director of the Institute for Theory and Computation and the Black Hole Initiative, and chair of the Board on Physics and Astronomy of the National Academies
- Theresa Mayer, executive vice president for research and partnerships and professor at Purdue University
- Daniela Rus, a professor of electrical engineering at MIT, director of the Computer Science and Artificial Intelligence Laboratory
- A. N. Sreeram, a senior vice president at the Dow Chemical Company with a doctorate in materials science and engineering from MIT
- Hussein Tawbi, associate professor at the Department of Melanoma Medical Oncology, University of Texas MD Anderson Cancer Center, Houston
- Shane Wall, the chief technology officer for Hewlett-Packard and director of HP Labs
- K. Birgitta Whaley, a chemistry professor at the University of California, Berkeley and a scientist at Lawrence Berkeley National Laboratory

The council was chaired by Office of Science and Technology Policy Director Kelvin Droegemeier.

=== PCAST membership under President Obama ===
The PCAST under President Obama was co-chaired by John P. Holdren and Eric Lander. The outgoing membership included:

- John P. Holdren was one of two co-chairs of PCAST in addition to his duties as the director of the Office of Science and Technology Policy in the Executive Office of the President and assistant to the president for science and technology. Previously he was a professor of environmental policy and director of the Program on Science, Technology, and Public Policy at Harvard Kennedy School. He also served concurrently as professor of environmental science and policy in Harvard's Department of Earth and Planetary Sciences and as director of the independent, nonprofit Woods Hole Research Center. He is a member of the National Academy of Sciences, the National Academy of Engineering, and the American Academy of Arts and Sciences, as well as a former president of the American Association for the Advancement of Science and recipient of the MacArthur Foundation Prize Fellowship.
- Eric Lander served as one of two co-chairs of PCAST as well as the director of the Broad Institute of MIT and Harvard. He is a professor of biology at MIT and professor of systems biology at Harvard Medical School, and is a member of the Whitehead Institute for Biomedical Research. He was one of the principal leaders of the Human Genome Project, recipient of the MacArthur Foundation Prize Fellowship and is a member of both the National Academy of Sciences and Institute of Medicine.
- William H. Press was one of the two vice-chairs, and is professor of computer sciences at the University of Texas at Austin, has wide-ranging expertise in computer science, astrophysics, and international security. A member of the U.S. National Academy of Sciences, he previously served as Deputy Laboratory Director for Science and Technology at the Los Alamos National Laboratory from 1998 to 2004. He is a professor of astronomy and physics at Harvard University and a former member of the Harvard–Smithsonian Center for Astrophysics (1982–1998).
- Maxine Savitz was one of the two vice chairs, and is a retired general manager of Technology Partnerships at Honeywell and has more than 30 years of experience managing research, development and implementation programs for the public and private sectors, including in the aerospace, transportation, and industrial sectors. From 1979 to 1983 she served as deputy assistant secretary for conservation in the U.S. Department of Energy. She currently serves as vice-president of the National Academy of Engineering.
- Wanda M. Austin, former president and CEO of The Aerospace Corporation. She was both the first woman, and the first African-American, to hold this position. Austin also served as interim president for the University of Southern California, following the resignation of C. L. Max Nikias. She was both the first woman, and the first African-American, to hold this position. In 2009, Austin served as a member of the U.S. Human Space Flight Plans Committee. The following year, she was appointed to the US Defense Science Board and in 2014 she became a member of the NASA Advisory Council, both of which were White House commissioned. In 2015, Austin was selected by President Barack Obama to serve on the President's Council of Advisors on Science and Technology.
- Rosina Bierbaum, a widely recognized expert in climate-change science and ecology, is dean of the School of Natural Resources and Environment at the University of Michigan. Her PhD is in evolutionary biology and ecology. She served as associate director for environment in OSTP in the Clinton administration, as well as acting director of OSTP in 2000–2001. She is a member of the American Academy of Arts and Sciences.
- Christine Cassel is president and CEO of the American Board of Internal Medicine and previously served as dean of the School of Medicine and vice president for medical affairs at Oregon Health & Science University. A member of the U.S. Institute of Medicine, she is a leading expert in geriatric medicine and quality of care.
- Christopher Chyba is professor of astrophysical sciences and international affairs at Princeton University and a member of the Committee on International Security and Arms Control of the National Academy of Sciences. His scientific work focuses on solar system exploration and his security-related research emphasizes nuclear and biological weapons policy, proliferation, and terrorism. He served on the White House staff from 1993 to 1995 at the National Security Council and the Office of Science and Technology Policy and was awarded a MacArthur Prize Fellowship (2001) for his work in both planetary science and international security.
- Sylvester James Gates, Jr., is the John S. Toll Professor of Physics and director of the Center for String and Particle Theory at the University of Maryland, College Park. He is the first African American to hold an endowed chair in physics at a major research university. He has served as a consultant to the National Science Foundation, the U.S. Departments of Energy and Defense, and the Educational Testing Service, and held appointments at MIT, Harvard, California Institute of Technology, and Howard University.
- Mark Gorenberg. is a managing director of Hummer Winblad Venture Partners, which he joined in 1990 when the firm began investing its first fund. Previously, he was with Sun Microsystems, where he managed emerging new media areas and was a member of the original SPARCstation team.
- Susan L. Graham is the Pehong Chen Distinguished Professor of Electrical Engineering and Computer Science Emerita at the University of California, Berkeley. She has won the Harvard Medal, the IEEE John von Neumann Medal, the Berkeley Citation, and the ACM/IEEE Ken Kennedy Award. She was named a University of California, Berkeley Fellow in 2011. She was a member of the President's Information Technology Advisory Committee (PITAC) from 1997 to 2003. She served as the Chief Computer Scientist for the National Partnership for Advanced Computational Infrastructure (NPACI) from 1997 to 2005. She currently chairs the Computing Research Association's Computing Community Consortium. Graham is a member of the National Academy of Engineering and the American Academy of Arts and Sciences, and she is a Fellow of the American Association for the Advancement of Science, the Association for Computing Machinery (ACM), and the Institute of Electrical and Electronics Engineers (IEEE).
- J. Michael McQuade is senior vice president for science & technology at United Technologies Corporation. Prior to joining UTC in 2006, he served as vice president of 3M's Medical Division, and before that he was president of Eastman Kodak's Health Imaging Business. He is a member of the board of trustees for Carnegie Mellon University, the board of directors of Project HOPE, and the board of trustees for Miss Porter's School. He serves on advisory and visiting boards for a number of university science and engineering schools. He currently serves as a member of the Secretary of Energy Advisory Board.
- Chad Mirkin is the founding director of the International Institute for Nanotechnology, the George B. Rathmann Professor of Chemistry, professor of chemical and biological engineering, professor of biomedical engineering, professor of materials science & engineering, and professor of medicine at Northwestern University. He is a chemist and a world-renowned nanoscience expert, who is known for his development of nanoparticle-based biodetection schemes, the invention of Dip-Pen Nanolithography, and contributions to supramolecular chemistry. He is one of only fifteen scientists, engineers and medical doctors, and the only chemist to be elected into all three branches of the National Academies, and he has been recognized for his accomplishments with over 90 national and international awards, including the $500,000 Lemelson-MIT Prize, the Linus Pauling Medal, and the Feynman Prize in Nanotechnology.
- Mario J. Molina is a professor of chemistry and biochemistry at the University of California, San Diego, and the Center for Atmospheric Sciences at the Scripps Institution of Oceanography, as well as director of the Mario Molina Center for Energy and Environment in Mexico City. He received the Nobel Prize in Chemistry in 1995 for his role in elucidating the threat to the Earth's ozone layer of chlorofluorocarbon gases. The only Mexican-born Nobel laureate in science, he served on PCAST for both Clinton terms. He is a member of both the National Academy of Sciences and the Institute of Medicine.
- Craig Mundie is chief research and strategy officer at Microsoft. He has 39 years of experience in the computer industry, beginning as a developer of operating systems. He co-founded and served as CEO of Alliant Computer Systems.
- Barbara A. Schaal is professor of biology at Washington University in St. Louis. She is a renowned plant geneticist who has used molecular genetics to understand the evolution and ecology of plants, ranging from the U.S. Midwest to the tropics. She serves as vice president of the National Academy of Sciences, the first woman ever elected to that role.
- Eric Schmidt is the executive chairman of Google and a former member of the board of directors of Apple Inc. Before joining Google, he served as chief technology officer for Sun Microsystems and later as CEO of Novell Inc.
- Daniel P. Schrag is the Sturgis Hooper Professor of Geology in the Department of Earth and Planetary Sciences at Harvard University and professor of environmental science and engineering in the School of Engineering and Applied Sciences. He is also director of the Harvard-wide Center for Environment. He was trained as a marine geochemist and has employed a variety of methods to study the carbon cycle and climate over a wide range of Earth's history. Awarded a MacArthur Prize Fellowship in 2000, he has recently been working on technological approaches to mitigating future climate change.
- Ed Penhoet is a director of Alta Partners. He serves on the board of directors for ChemoCentryx, Immune Design, Metabolex, and Scynexis. He was a co-founder of Chiron and served as the company's president and chief executive officer from 1981 until 1998. He was also a member of the Independent Citizens Oversight Committee for the California Institute for Regenerative Medicine (CIRM). From 2004 to 2008 he served as the president of the Gordon and Betty Moore Foundation, where he is currently serving on the board. Penhoet was a faculty member of the biochemistry department of the University of California, Berkeley. From July 1998 to July 2002, he served as dean of the School of Public Health at the University of California, Berkeley. He is a member of the US Institute of Medicine and the American Academy of Arts and Sciences. He serves on the board of Children's Hospital & Research Center Oakland.

== See also ==
- Office of Science and Technology Policy
- National Science and Technology Council
- Technology policy
