= John Banovetz =

American chemist and scientist

- Occupation: Chemist

John Banovetz is a chemist, materials scientist and former managing director of 3M. Since 2021, he has been a member of the President’s Council of Advisors on Science and Technology (PCAST).

== Career ==
Banovetz is head of chemical manufacturing at 3M, where he oversees more than 8,000 researchers world-wide. He was also the managing director of 3M in Germany, Austria and Switzerland.

He is a trustee of the Science Museum of Minnesota, as well as the Hamline University. He also holds multiple patents for various adhesives and polymer science.
