= Dorota Grejner-Brzezińska =

Polish-American civil engineer

Dorota A. Grejner-Brzezińska (born 1963) is a Polish-American geodetic engineer known for her work on the Global Positioning System. She is University Distinguished Professor and Lowber B. Strange Endowed Chair in the Department of Civil, Environmental and Geodetic Engineering at Ohio State University, and director of the Satellite Positioning and Inertial Navigation at Ohio State, where she was also the Associate Dean for Research in the College of Engineering and senior associate vice president for research of the university. She current serves as Vice President of the Office of Knowledge Enterprise, part of Ohio State University's Enterprise for Research, Innovation and Knowledge.

Her research on the Global Positioning System has included improvements in the accuracy of methods for estimating GPS satellite orbits, the earth's rotational elements, and local positions "based on carrier-phase triple differences"; integration of GPS into airborne remote sensing; GNSS enhancements and hybrid navigation systems based on inertial navigation systems and other sensor data; and the detection of earthquakes and nuclear testing through disturbances measured in GPS signals.

== Education and career ==
Grejner-Brzezińska is originally from Olsztyn, she earned a master's degree in 1988 at the Agricultural and Technical University of Olsztyn in Poland, now the University of Warmia and Mazury in Olsztyn. She completed a MS and Ph.D. in 1995 at Ohio State University, as a Fulbright Scholar.

After this, she remained at Ohio State for postdoctoral research in the NASA Center for Space Development, and was appointed as a faculty member in 1999. She was given the Lowber B. Strange Endowed Chair in 2013, and chaired the Department of Civil, Environmental and Geodetic Engineering from 2013 to 2017, when she became Associate Dean for Research in the College of Engineering. Ohio State named her as senior associate vice president for research in 2020, and Vice President for Knowledge Enterprise in 2022.

She served as president of the Institute of Navigation for 2015–2017, was named to the President's Council of Advisors on Science and Technology in 2019,, became lead investigator on the NSF funded Engineering Research Visioning Alliance (ERVA) in 2021. Most recently, she was appointed to the National Science Board (NSB) by President Biden.

== Recognition ==
Grejner-Brzezińska was named a Fellow of the International Association of Geodesy in 2007, a Fellow of the Institute of Navigation in 2011, and a Fellow of the Royal Institute of Navigation in 2014. She was named to the National Academy of Engineering in 2019 "for contributions to geodetic science and satellite navigation, including integration with artificial intelligence", and was the first woman from Ohio State to be named to the academy. She was named to the 2021 class of Fellows of the American Association for the Advancement of Science.

In 2016 the Institute of Navigation gave Grejner-Brzezińska their Johannes Kepler Award "for sustained and significant contributions to satellite navigation", and the University of Warmia and Mazury in Olsztyn gave her their Lubomir W. Baran Award "for her outstanding research achievements in the fields of geodesy and satellite navigation". The Institute of Navigation gave her their distinguished service award in 2017. She was the 2018 recipient of the John Harrison Award for lifetime achievements of the International Association of the Institutes of Navigation, the first woman to receive this award. Grejner-Brzezinska has also been recognized for her work in diversity, receiving the Institute of International Education’s Scholar Rescue Fund Award for Outstanding Service, in recognition of “support to IIE‐SRE Fellow Dr. Eblal Zakzok and commitment to preserving the voices and ideas of threatened scholars worldwide”, November 2017 as well as the College of Engineering's Faculty Diversity Excellence Award in 2021.
