= Jan Peter Toennies =

German-American scientist

Jan Peter Toennies (born 3 May 1930) is a German-American scientist, known for his contributions to molecular physics, surface scattering, and the development of helium nanodroplet spectroscopy.

== Early life and education ==
Toennies was born in Philadelphia, Pennsylvania on 3 May 1930 to German immigrant parents. He is the grandson of sociologist Ferdinand Tönnies. He graduated from Lower Merion High School, outside of Philadelphia, in 1948. He went on to Amherst College, where he received a B.A. in 1952, and to Brown University, where he received a Ph.D. in chemistry in 1957. During graduate school he was a Fulbright student in Göttingen 1953–1954.

== Career ==
After graduation in 1957 he moved to the Physics Department of the University of Bonn where he was a postdoctoral researcher with Wolfgang Paul. In 1965 he obtained the Habilitation in experimental physics, becoming an assistant professor, as well as a guest professor in the Department of Physical Chemistry at the Gothenburg University. In 1969 he became director at the Max Planck Institute for Fluid Dynamics. From 1971 he was a professor in Göttingen and honorary professor at the University of Bonn. He retired officially in 1998, but was acting director until 2004.

== Research ==
Toennies measured total and inelastic collision cross sections for transitions between rotational states of various gases with quantum-state resolution. He investigated vibrational excitation of H_{2} in central collisions with Lithium ions using the time-of-flight method, as well as dissociation in single collision events. In Göttingen, his group solved the Boltzmann equation while accounting for quantum effects and realistic interaction potentials in helium free-jet expansion, and proposed an improved model for van der Waals potential, referred to as Tang-Toennies model. High-resolution measurements of surface phonon dispersion for Ag, LiF, NaF, KCl, and Pt-crystals were carried out using inelastic scattering of helium atoms. The group achieved non-destructive detection of fragile He, H_{2} and D_{2} clusters by utilizing diffraction from nanoscopic transmission gratings. A spectroscopic study of SF_{6} doped in helium nanodroplets revealed sharp spectral features of the embedded molecule. This indicated that the molecule was extremely cold and that it resides in its ground state at a temperature of 0.37 K, practically unaffected by the helium environment and could rotate freely as if in a vacuum. Subsequent spectroscopic experiments demonstrated that the free rotations were related to the microscopic superfluidity of helium droplets, and, for the first time, of a small numbers of hydrogen molecules.

== Monographs ==
- E. F. Greene and J. Peter Toennies: Chemische Reaktionen in Stoßwellen, Dr. Dietrich Steinkopff Verlag, Darmstadt, 1959
- E. F. Greene and J. Peter Toennies: Chemical Reactions in Shock Waves, Edward Arnold (Publishers) Ltd. London, 1964
- G. Benedek and J. Peter Toennies: Atomic Scale Dynamics at Surfaces: Theory and Experimental Studies with Helium Atom Scattering, Springer, Heidelberg, 2018
- A. Slenczka and J. Peter Toennies: Molecules in Superfluid Helium Nanodroplets: Spectroscopy, Structure, and Dynamics, Springer Cham, 2022
