= Phil Venables (computer scientist) =

British-American entrepreneur and business executive

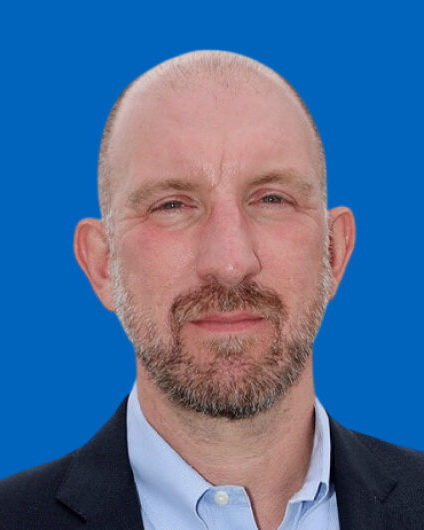
- Born: Britain
- Education: University of York, B.S. Computer Science; University of Oxford, M.S. in Computation and Cryptography
- Occupations: Chief Information Security Officer at Google Cloud, computer scientist

Phil Venables is a computer scientist who has been the chief information security officer (CISO) at Google Cloud since 2020. He specializes in information and cyber security, as well as enterprise risk and technology risk. Previous to Venables's position at Google, he held a number of roles at Goldman Sachs and served on the Board of Goldman Sachs Bank. Since 2021, he has also been a member of the President’s Council of Advisors on Science and Technology (PCAST).

== Early life and education ==
Venables was born in Britain, and attended the University of York in the United Kingdom, where he received a B.S. with honors in computer science in 1989. In 1990, he graduated with an M.S. in Computation and Cryptography from Oxford.

== Career ==
Venables began his career in 1992 as an Information Security Manager at Barclays Bank in the United Kingdom, where he left in 1995 to take on the position as global head of technology risk management at the Standard Chartered Bank. In 1996, Venables became a member of the Highlands Group (DARPA-Office of Net Assessment), an advisory firm for the Department of Defense. From 1997 to 2000, he was CISO at Deutsche Bank, based in London, UK. In 2000, he began at Goldman Sachs, first as partner and CISO until 2017, when he was partner and Chief Operational Risk Officer until 2018, then director until 2020. He is the co-founder and leader of various corporate and industrial cyber security initiatives.

Since 2015, Venables has been a life member of the Council on Foreign Relations (CFR). In 2016, he was a part of Barack Obama’s Commission on Enhancing National Cybersecurity.

He has been CISO at Google Cloud since 2020, and since 2021, he has been director at HackerOne, supply chain technology company Interos, and NIST's Information Security and Privacy Advisory Board. Over the years, Venables has served on multiple non-profit boards, including New York University Tandon School of Engineering, and New York University Stern School of Business' Business Volatility and Risk Institute, as well as co-chairing the board of consumer financial information protection organization Sheltered Harbor, and also co-founded and directed various initiatives of the U.S. Financial Services Sector. In 2000, he co-founded the Center for Internet Security (CIS), and served on its board from 2014 until 2020.

In September 2022, Venables was named to the BallisticX cybersecurity advisory board for San Francisco-based Ballistic Ventures, an early-stage cybersecurity investment firm.

Venables serves on the President's Council of Advisors on Science and Technology, under President Biden. He also holds several information security-related patents, including designing a virtual wallet with cryptographic currency for securities settlement, and creating a method for assessing how vulnerable a network is to cyberthreats.

== Awards ==
In 1995, Venables was awarded the designation of Chartered Engineer, in 2002 that of Chartered Scientists, and in 2005 he was elected Fellow of the British Computer Society.

In 2008, he received multiple awards at the RSA Conference. He received the FS-ISAC Critical Infrastructure Award in 2017, as well as the ISACA Wasserman Award and the SINET Innovation Award in 2019.
