= Keivan Stassun =

American astronomer (born 1972)

Keivan Guadalupe Stassun
- Born: July 1972 (age 54)
- Education: University of California, Berkeley (A.B.); University of Wisconsin, Madison (PhD)
- Awards: MacArthur Fellowship; National Medal of Science
- Scientific career
- Fields: Astrophysics
- Workplaces: Vanderbilt University; Fisk University
- Doctoral advisor: Bob Mathieu

Keivan Guadalupe Stassun (born July 1972) is an American physicist and astronomer in the field of exoplanets. He is a physics professor at Vanderbilt University and an adjunct professor at Fisk University, institutions at which he oversees and co-directs the Fisk-Vanderbilt Masters-to-Ph.D Bridge Program. Stassun has been an activist promoting the integration of underrepresented groups in the fields of STEM, especially math and science through research, outreach and teaching.

== Family life and education ==
Stassun was born to a Mexican mother and an Iranian father who left when he was an infant. He lived in Venice, California until age seven, when his mother and stepfather married and moved to the San Fernando Valley where he grew up.

He was identified as "high IQ" and was recommended for a gifted magnet program: Sherman Oaks Center for Enriched Studies, where he went for both middle and high school. During his high school years he participated in a number of activities in the fine arts, sports, speech and debate, and newspapers and yearbook, all while graduating second in his class.

He first attended the Naval Academy for a year, undergoing basic training on Treasure Island, but gave it up. He then attended University of California, Berkeley as a Chancellor Scholar where he studied astronomy under the tutelage of Gibor Basri.

After Berkeley, he moved on to the University of Wisconsin to do his graduate work under the guidance of Bob Mathieu. At Wisconsin, his ideas about the importance of combining scholarly practices in research, teaching, and outreach began to crystallize. In addition to carrying out his thesis research, he also became active in math/science education for minorities in the local schools, and he developed an astronomy outreach program (Scopes for Schools) which provides teachers with resources and training for teaching astronomy.

Stassun serves as chair of the exoplanet science team of the Vanderbilt Initiative in Data-intensive Astrophysics (VIDA). VIDA is a pilot program focused on the analysis of data from astronomical surveys.

He currently divides his time between Nashville, where he has 2 sons, and his partner in Los Angeles.

== Awards and recognition ==
- 2004 – National Science Foundation CAREER Award
- 2006 – Cottrell Scholar Award from Research Corporation
- 2007 – Ford Foundation Fellow
- 2014 – Presidential Award for Excellence in Science, Mathematics and Engineering Mentoring (PAESMEM)
- 2015 – TREE (Transformational Research and Excellence in Education) Award from Research Corporation
- 2016 – Fellow, American Physical Society
- 2018 – American Association for the Advancement of Science (AAAS) Mentor Award
- 2019 – Cottrell Plus Impact Award from Research Corporation
- 2020 - Elected a Legacy Fellow of the American Astronomical Society in 2020.
- 2024 - MacArthur Fellowship
- 2025 - Recipient of the National Medal of Science.

== Selected publications ==
- Stassun, Keivan Guadalupe (2000–07). "The Connection Between Rotation, Circumstellar Disks, and Accretion Among Low-Mass Pre-Main-Sequence Stars"
- Stassun, Keivan G.; Mathieu, Robert (2002–08). "A Spectroscopic and Photometric Study of Newly Discovered Pre-Main- Sequence Eclipsing Binaries in Orion"
