= Ryan Panchadsaram =

American government official

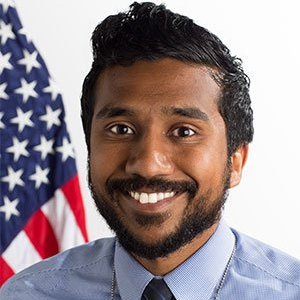

Deputy Chief Technology Officer of the United States Under Todd Park
- Incumbent
- Assumed office May 2014
- President: Barack Obama

Personal details
- Education: University of California, Berkeley

Ryan Panchadsaram was the Deputy Chief Technology Officer of the United States. He assumed this role under the second Chief Technology Officer of the United States, Todd Park. Panchadsaram was formerly a senior advisor to Park, starting in 2013, and is credited as an early member of the Healthcare.gov rescue team. Panchadsaram is currently a partner at Kleiner Perkins Caufield and Byers and co-founder of the United States Digital Response in response to the COVID-19 pandemic.

== Education ==
Panchadsaram earned a bachelor's degree in Industrial Engineering and Operations Research from the University of California, Berkeley.

== Career ==
Prior to joining the federal government, Panchadsaram was responsible for Customer Development at Ginger.io, a spin-off from MIT Media Lab, a health industry big data company. He was a fellow at Rock Health, where Pipette, the company he founded, was incubated and ultimately acquired by Ginger.io. He previously worked at Microsoft and Salesforce. While at Microsoft, Panchadsaram was responsible for the user experience and design of Outlook for Mac 2011. During his time there, he filed multiple patents for innovations in geolocation, user interfaces, and large datasets. Panchadsaram sits on the board of SeventyK, a young adult cancer advocacy group. In 2012, Panchadsaram won first place in The Guardian & Google's International Data Visualization Challenge.

In 2021, Panchadsaram co-authored the book Speed & Scale: An Action Plan for Solving Our Climate Crisis Now with Kleiner Perkins chairman John Doerr. The book is on the subject of climate change mitigation strategies.

== Deputy Chief Technology Officer of the United States ==
As U.S. Deputy Chief Technology Officer, Panchadsaram worked on President Obama's Smarter IT Delivery Initiative, including the Smarter IT Delivery Cross-Agency Priority Goal, the U.S. Digital Services Playbook, and the creation of the United States Digital Service.

Panchadsaram worked on the creation of Next.Data.gov and ultimately the redesign of Data.gov, and helped coordinate and curate a nationwide competition co-sponsored by the Office of the National Coordinator and the U.S. Department of Veterans Affairs to re-design the appearance of the patient health record. Panchadsaram was also part of the team that launched and expanded adoption of Blue Button, the concept of and technology for patients to access their own health records in a structured, computable manner.

=== Healthcare.gov Tech Surge ===
Panchadsaram was one of the first members of the "tech surge" team assembled by U.S. Chief Technology Officer Todd Park to assess and ultimately fix Healthcare.gov in October 2013, remaining with the tech surge until completion.
