= MIT Solve =

MIT department (2016-)

- Founded: 2016
- Purpose: Open innovation
- Location: Cambridge, Massachusetts
- Region served: Worldwide
- Executive Director: Hala Hanna
- Parent organization: Massachusetts Institute of Technology
- Employees: 35
- Website: solve.mit.edu

MIT Solve is an initiative of the Massachusetts Institute of Technology (MIT) which runs "Global Challenges" to find solutions to global problems through an online platform.

== Method ==
Each year, Solve announces new Global Challenges for which it seeks solutions. The first round of judging takes place once solution applications close. Solve staff screens all solutions submitted on its online open innovation platform and funnels strong applicants to the Challenge Leadership Group, a panel of industry leaders. The Challenge Leadership Group then selects finalists for each Challenge. Finalists are invited to a live pitch event where the most promising solutions are selected to make up that year's Solver class. Once selected, the Solver class gains access to Solve’s community. The Solve staff helps match-make between the Solver class and leaders from the tech industry, business, philanthropy, government, and civil society who seek partnerships and opportunities to implement ideas.

== Initiatives ==
=== Solve at MIT ===
Solve’s annual flagship meeting takes place on MIT’s campus. Solver teams present their solutions and participate in workshops with Solve members to develop partnerships to pilot and implement solutions. The next set of Solve Challenges are planned at this event. The includes multiple plenary sessions with speakers which have included Canadian Prime Minister Justin Trudeau, Technical Advisor and Board Member of Alphabet Inc. Eric Schmidt, Cellist Yo-Yo Ma, and Senior Vice President of Amazon Alexa Tom Taylor.

The event is open to Solve members, and to the MIT community for select sessions. Past Solve Challenges include Work of the Future, Frontlines of Health, Coastal Communities, and Teachers & Educators.

=== Solveathon workshops ===
Solveathon workshops are independently-hosted events focused on rapid ideation and refinement using Human Centered Design to brainstorm solutions to Solve’s Challenges. Ideas developed during a Solveathon are submitted to Solve's online open innovation platform, and the team can continue working on it after the event or the ideas can inspire others. Solveathon workshops have been hosted across the world, including Vietnam, Ecuador, and India.

=== Solve Challenge Finals ===
The Solve Challenge Finals are held during the United Nations General Assembly at the United Nations Headquarters in New York City. During the Solve Challenge Finals, finalists selected by Solve’s Challenge Leadership Group are invited to pitch their solutions live. Those chosen by Solve’s judges during the Challenge Finals join the Solve community as a new Solver class. Notable selected Solver teams have included Emma Yang, Timeless, Angel Adelaja, FreshDirect, and Nightingale Health.

== History ==
Solve was formed in 2015 by then-president of MIT L. Rafael Reif with a solution oriented format building on an earlier MIT Technology Review TR 35 event partnership with Solve for X. Past collaborators have included the Bill and Melinda Gates Foundation, World Bank, and Trinity Challenge, which is a foundation that had been launched in response to COVID-19, and based in Trinity College, Cambridge.
