= Solve for X =

Community solutions engagement project and think tank-like event

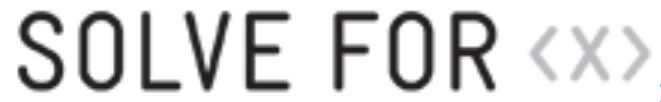
- Official language: English

Solve for X was a community solution engagement project and think tank-like event launched by Google to encourage collaboration, solve global issues and support innovators. The "X" in the title represents a remedy that someone or a team is already pursuing which ran from 2012 to 2014.

== History ==
The project began on February 1, 2012 at a three-day convention at CordeValle Resort in San Martin, California. Google's team sought people working on various solutions. Solve for X talks were presented by innovators to 50 people in attendance who then collaboratively brainstormed to help those pursuing solutions, hosted by Google executives Eric Schmidt, Megan Smith, and Astro Teller who co-created the project. The convention took place annually. The website launched on February 6, 2012.

The pitch component of Solve for X has been likened to TED talks since both projects host seminars by innovators, which can be viewed by others online. European director Bruno Giussani stated regarding Google's endeavor: "The world needs more ideas, not fewer and more commitment to sharing them freely and openly so that collectively we can test-run them and turn them into reality ... Google being at the origin of this, obviously technology and engineering will play a big role in Solve For X".

Solve for X, co-founded by two leaders at Google with the support of Eric Schmidt, was initially believed to be linked to the Google X Lab working on new technology such as web-connected appliances, driverless cars, and space elevators,

In 2013–14, the Solve for X team joined with several partner organizations, to support embedding their talks-plus-audience-community-brainstorming format in partner gatherings, including TEDxBoston (then TEDxBeaconStreet), South by Southwest (SXSW), the Tribeca Film Festival, MIT Technology Review TR35 (which co-inspired MIT Solve), ASU, and held an event on Capitol Hill with FabLab, ReWork and AAAS. The inaugural meeting that took place in 2012 featured the inventor and entrepreneur Rob McGinnis, discussing "Global Water Scarcity". Ira Glass opened the 2014 summit with a talk on climate change entitled "Ira Glass tries to boss you into a moonshot".
