= K. Birgitta Whaley =

American professor of chemistry

- Born: 1956 (age 69–70); Barnehurst, Kent, England
- Education: Oxford University, University of Chicago
- Scientific career
- Fields: Chemistry, Physics, Quantum Information
- Workplaces: University of California, Berkeley, Lawrence Berkeley National Laboratory
- Doctoral advisor: John C. Light

Katherine Birgitta Whaley (born 1956) is a professor of chemistry at the University of California Berkeley and a senior faculty scientist in the Division of Chemical Sciences at Lawrence Berkeley National Laboratory. At UC Berkeley, Whaley is the director of the Berkeley Quantum Information and Computation Center, a member of the executive board for the Center for Quantum Coherent Science, and a member of the Kavli Energy Nanosciences Institute. At Lawrence Berkeley National Laboratory, Whaley is a member of the Quantum Algorithms Team for Chemical Sciences in the research area of resource-efficient algorithms.

Whaley's research team explores topics in the areas of quantum information, quantum computation, macroscopic quantum systems, and quantum control/simulation.

== Education, career, and service ==
Whaley received her B.A. from Oxford University (1978) where she was a Nuffield Scholar at St Hilda's from 1974. Whaley has stated that, during her undergraduate studies, she found it hard to decide whether to study chemistry or physics. After graduating, Whaley was a Kennedy Fellow at Harvard University (1978–1979), and went on to receive her M. Sc. (1982) and Ph.D. (1984) from the University of Chicago where she was a student of John C. Light. Her thesis was titled "Topics in molecule-surface scattering and multiphoton excitation dynamics". She went on to be a Golda Meir Fellow at the Hebrew University, Jerusalem (1984–1985) and a post-doctoral fellow at Tel Aviv University (1985–1986) where she studied with Abraham Nitzan and Robert Gerber. Whaley joined the Chemistry faculty at UC Berkeley in 1986. Her interest in quantum biology was spurred by a series of low-temperature experiments in bacteria performed by Graham Fleming and his team in 2007.

Whaley has been recognized by many awards for her scientific contributions in the course of her career. In 2002 she was nominated as a Fellow of American Physical Society by the Division of Computational Physics "for her contributions to theoretical understanding of quantum nanoscale phenomena, especially in superfluid helium droplets, and to control of decoherence in quantum information processing".

Whaley served on the advisory board of the Kavli Institute for Theoretical Physics (KITP) at the University of California, Santa Barbara from 2014 to 2017 and was chairperson from 2016 to 2017. From 2017-2018, Whaley was a Simons Distinguished Visiting Scholar/Scientist at KITP. At the Perimeter Institute for Theoretical Physics, Whaley served on the scientific advisory committee from 2010 to 2013. In the American Physical Society, Whaley served as vice chair, chair elect and then chair for the Division of Chemical Physics from 2009 to 2011. In 2016, Whaley also served as chair of the 2015 Fellowship Committee of the American Physical Society Division of Quantum Information.

In the area of editorial roles, Whaley has served on the editorial board of Journal of Chemical Physics (2010–2012) and the Journal of Physical Chemistry (1998–2003). Since 1996, she has served on the editorial board of Chemical Physics. She a current member of the editorial boards of Quantum Information Processing (2005–), European Physical Journal (EPJ) Quantum Technology (2013–), and Advances in Physics X (2014–).

In October 2019, Whaley was appointed to the President's Council of Advisors on Science and Technology.

== Research and notable publications ==
- Lidar, D. A.; Chuang, I. L.; Whaley, K. B. (1998-09-21). "Decoherence-Free Subspaces for Quantum Computation". Physical Review Letters. 81 (12): 2594–2597. arXiv:quant-ph/9807004. Bibcode:1998PhRvL..81.2594L. doi:10.1103/PhysRevLett.81.2594. S2CID 13979882.
- Whaley, K. B.; Burkard, G.; Kempe, J.; Bacon, D.; DiVincenzo, D. P. (2000). "Universal quantum computation with the exchange interaction". Nature. 408 (6810): 339–342. arXiv:quant-ph/0005116. Bibcode:2000Natur.408..339D. doi:10.1038/35042541. ISSN 1476-4687. PMID 11099036. S2CID 4326729.
- Shenvi, Neil; Kempe, Julia; Whaley, K. Birgitta (2003-05-23). "Quantum random-walk search algorithm". Physical Review A. 67 (5) 052307. arXiv:quant-ph/0210064. Bibcode:2003PhRvA..67e2307S. doi:10.1103/PhysRevA.67.052307. S2CID 8688989.
- Bacon, D.; Kempe, J.; Lidar, D. A.; Whaley, K. B. (2000-08-21). "Universal Fault-Tolerant Quantum Computation on Decoherence-Free Subspaces". Physical Review Letters. 85 (8): 1758–1761. arXiv:quant-ph/9909058. Bibcode:2000PhRvL..85.1758B. doi:10.1103/PhysRevLett.85.1758. PMID 10970607. S2CID 14594344.
- Lidar, D. A.; Bacon, D.; Whaley, K. B. (1999-05-31). "Concatenating Decoherence-Free Subspaces with Quantum Error Correcting Codes". Physical Review Letters. 82 (22): 4556–4559. arXiv:quant-ph/9809081. Bibcode:1999PhRvL..82.4556L. doi:10.1103/PhysRevLett.82.4556. S2CID 3726305.
- Whaley, K. Birgitta; Graham R. Fleming; Ishizaki, Akihito; Sarovar, Mohan (2010). "Quantum entanglement in photosynthetic light-harvesting complexes". Nature Physics. 6 (6): 462–467. arXiv:0905.3787. Bibcode:2010NatPh...6..462S. doi:10.1038/nphys1652. ISSN 1745-2481. S2CID 5040519.
- Kempe, J.; Bacon, D.; Lidar, D. A.; Whaley, K. B. (2001-03-20). "Theory of decoherence-free fault-tolerant universal quantum computation". Physical Review A. 63 (4) 042307. arXiv:quant-ph/0004064. Bibcode:2001PhRvA..63d2307K. doi:10.1103/PhysRevA.63.042307. S2CID 44200695.

== Awards ==
- Fellow, American Academy of Arts and Sciences (2018, Speciality: Physics, Area: Mathematical and Physical Sciences)
- Albrecht Lecturer, Cornell University (2015)
- Quantum Frontiers Distinguished Lecturer, University of Waterloo (2014)
- Phi Beta Kappa Visiting Scholar (2013–2014)
- Senior fellow, Wissenschaftskolleg zu Berlin (2012–2013)
- Maria Goeppert-Mayer Symposium Lecturer, UC San Diego (2005)
- Miller Institute for Basic Research in Science Professor, University of California, Berkeley (2002–2003)
- Fellow, American Physical Society (2002)
- Alexander von Humboldt Senior Scientist (1996–1997)
- A. P. Sloan Foundation Fellow (1991–1993)
- Bergmann Award (1986)
