= Office of Science and Technology Policy =

Department of the United States government

Agency overview
- Formed: May 11, 1976; 50 years ago
- Headquarters: The White House
- Employees: 150
- Agency executive: Michael Kratsios, Director
- Parent agency: Executive Office of the President
- Website: WhiteHouse.gov/OSTP

The Office of Science and Technology Policy (OSTP) is a division of the White House Executive Office of the President (EOP), established by United States Congress on May 11, 1976, with the mandate to advise the president on science and technology on domestic and international affairs.

The OSTP Director is colloquially known as the "science advisor to the president," and this role was elevated to a Cabinet position by President Joe Biden (Eric Lander was the first to hold this dual role). The Director is also responsible for leading the National Science and Technology Council. This role is also known as the "science and tech czar" in the White House.

== History ==
=== 20th century ===
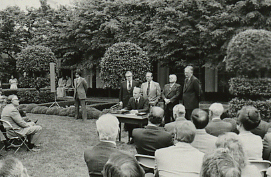
President Ford signing H.R. 10230, establishing the Office of Science and Technology Policy

President Richard M. Nixon eliminated the President's Science Advisory Committee after his second Science Advisor, Edward E. David Jr., resigned in 1973, rather than appointing a replacement. In 1975, the American Physical Society president Chien-Shiung Wu met with the new president Gerald Ford to discuss efforts to reinstate a scientific body of advisors for the executive branch and the president. President Ford supported the effort. The United States Congress then established the OSTP in 1976 with a broad mandate to advise the President and others within the Executive Office of the President on the effects of science and technology on domestic and international affairs. The 1976 Act also authorizes OSTP to lead inter-agency efforts to develop and to implement sound science and technology policies and budgets and to work with the private sector, state and local governments, the science and higher education communities, and other nations toward this end.

=== 21st century ===
==== Second Obama Administration ====
On 17 October 2014 the OSTP halted funding for gain of function research (GOFR).

==== First Trump administration ====
Under President Donald Trump, OSTP's staff dropped from 135 to 45 people by November 2017. In December 2017 the OSTP ban on GOFR was replaced by an expert-driven “US Department of Health and Human Services (HHS) framework for guiding funding decisions about proposed research involving pathogens that have enhanced potential for creating pandemics.”

The OSTP director position remained vacant for over two years, the longest vacancy for the position since the office's founding. Kelvin Droegemeier, an atmospheric scientist who previously served as the vice president of research at the University of Oklahoma, was nominated for the position on August 1, 2018 and confirmed by the Senate on January 2, 2019.

Michael Kratsios was nominated by President Trump to be the fourth Chief Technology Officer of the United States and associate director of OSTP in March 2019 and was unanimously confirmed by the Senate on August 1, 2019.

==== Biden administration ====
President Joe Biden named, and the Senate later unanimously confirmed, Eric Lander as head of the Office of Science and Technology Policy, while also upgrading the position to a cabinet-level post. Lander resigned in February 2022 following reports that engaged in abusive conduct against both subordinates and other White House officials.

- In 2022, OSTP held a roundtable discussion with some of the nation’s leading scientists to discuss the need to combat the climate crisis and counter arguments for delaying climate action. It is the first time that the White House has recognized scientists who study the climate denial operation run by the fossil fuel industry.
- On August 25, 2022, OSTP issued guidance to make all federally funded research in the United States freely available without delay.

== Directors ==
Michael Kratsios is the current Director of the Office of Science and Technology Policy, appointed by the Trump Administration on March 25, 2025.

During the Biden Administration, the OSTP Director role was elevated to the cabinet.

Mathematician and geneticist Eric Lander was sworn in as Director on June 2, 2021, and later resigned on February 18, 2022, following allegations of misconduct. In February 2022, deputy director Alondra Nelson was appointed acting director, while former National Institutes of Health (NIH) director Francis Collins would serve as acting science advisor. Both assumed positions on February 18, 2022. In October 2022, Arati Prabhakar became Director of the Office of Science and Technology Policy.

List of OSTP directors.

Denotes acting capacity.

No.	Image	Name	Start	End	Ref.	President
1		Guyford Stever	August 9, 1976	January 20, 1977		Gerald Ford (1974–1977)
2		Frank Press	January 20, 1977	January 20, 1981		Jimmy Carter (1977–1981)
–		Benjamin Huberman; Acting	March 5, 1981	August 1981		Ronald Reagan (1981–1989)
3		Jay Keyworth	August 1981	December 1985		Ronald Reagan (1981–1989)
–		John McTague; Acting	January 1986	May 23, 1986		Ronald Reagan (1981–1989)
–		Richard Johnson; Acting	May 24, 1986	October 1, 1986		Ronald Reagan (1981–1989)
4		William Graham	October 2, 1986	June 1989		Ronald Reagan (1981–1989)
–		Thomas Rona; Acting	June 1989	August 1989		George H. W. Bush (1989–1993)
–		William Wells; Acting	August 1989	August 1989		George H. W. Bush (1989–1993)
5		Allan Bromley	August 1989	January 20, 1993		George H. W. Bush (1989–1993)
6		Jack Gibbons	January 20, 1993	April 3, 1998		Bill Clinton (1993–2001)
–		Kerri-Ann Jones; Acting	April 4, 1998	August 3, 1998		Bill Clinton (1993–2001)
7		Neal Lane	August 4, 1998	January 20, 2001		Bill Clinton (1993–2001)
–		Rosina Bierbaum; Acting	January 21, 2001	September 30, 2001		George W. Bush (2001–2009)
–		Clifford Gabriel; Acting	October 1, 2001	October 28, 2001		George W. Bush (2001–2009)
8		Jack Marburger	October 29, 2001	January 20, 2009		George W. Bush (2001–2009)
9		John Holdren	March 19, 2009	January 20, 2017		Barack Obama (2009–2017)
–		Ted Wackler; Acting	January 20, 2017	January 11, 2019		Donald Trump (2017–2021)
10		Kelvin Droegemeier	January 11, 2019	January 20, 2021		Donald Trump (2017–2021)
11		Eric Lander	June 2, 2021	February 18, 2022		Joe Biden (2021–2025)
–		Alondra Nelson; Acting	February 18, 2022	October 3, 2022		Joe Biden (2021–2025)
12		Arati Prabhakar	October 3, 2022	January 20, 2025		Joe Biden (2021–2025)
–		Michael Kratsios	January 20, 2025	March 25, 2025		Donald Trump (2025–present)
13		Michael Kratsios	March 25, 2025	present		Donald Trump (2025–present)

== OSTP Deputy Directors / Deputy "National Science Advisor to the President" ==
Key executive positions have varied among administrations. These executives manage OSTP divisions and are Deputies to the Director / National Science Advisor, informally known as "Deputy National Science and Technology Advisor" to the President, or "Deputy Science Czar."

Biden administration (2021-2024)

The Biden-era OSTP relied on Deputy Directors to lead each OSTP division, which was seen as an expansion or "elevation" of the national role of science and technology by President Biden after elevating the office to the Cabinet level following the COVID-19 Pandemic.

- Climate and Environment - Deputy Director for Climate and Environment: Jane Lubchenco, former NOAA Administrator
- Energy/Industrial Innovation - Deputy Director for Energy and Chief Strategist for the Energy Transition: Sally Benson; division renamed - Deputy Director for Industrial Innovation: Justina Gallegos
- Health Outcomes - Deputy Director of Health Sciences: Carrie Wolinetz; Deputy Assistant to the President for Cancer Moonshot and Deputy Director for Health Outcomes: Danielle Carnival
- National Security - Deputy Director for National Security and Coordinator for Technology and National Security of the National Security Council: Jason Matheny; Deputy Director for National Security and Special Assistant to the President: Stephen Welby
- Science and Society - Principal Deputy Director for Science and Society and Deputy Assistant to the President: Alondra Nelson (performed the duties of the Director from February to October 2022, when she became the first African American and first woman of color to lead OSTP). Danny Goroff served as deputy director in 2023, and Kei Koizumi served as Deputy of this team in 2024.
- Technology - Deputy Director for Technology and Principal Deputy U.S. Chief Technology Officer: Alexander Macgillivray; Dierdre Mulligan; and Karen Kornbluh

Obama administration (2008-2016)

- Megan Smith served as the first U.S. CTO and sole OSTP "Deputy Director" during the Obama Administration.

== See also ==
- Science Advisor to the President
- United States Digital Service
- 18F
- Title 32 of the Code of Federal Regulations
- National Science and Technology Council
- President's Council of Advisors on Science and Technology
- DOGE (Trump II Administration)
