= Megan Smith =

American engineer (born 1964)

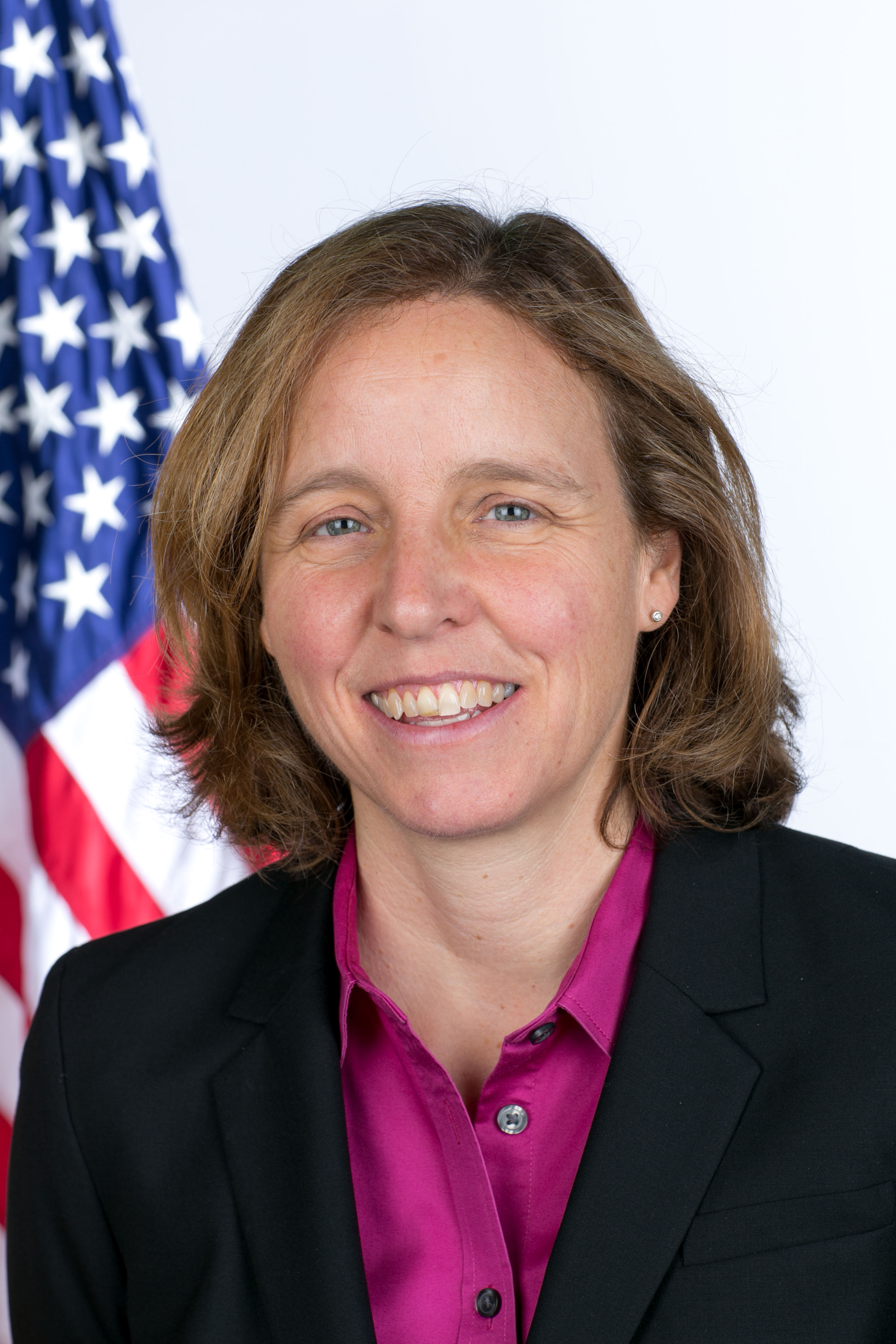
- Official portrait, 2014

3rd Chief Technology Officer of the United States
- In office September 4, 2014 – January 20, 2017
- President: Barack Obama
- Preceded by: Todd Park
- Succeeded by: Michael Kratsios

Personal details
- Born: October 21, 1964 (age 62)
- Party: Democratic
- Spouse: Kara Swisher (m. 1999; div. 2017)
- Children: 2
- Education: Massachusetts Institute of Technology (BS, MS)
- Smith's voice recorded June 2015

Megan J. Smith (born October 21, 1964) is an American engineer and technologist. She was the third Chief Technology Officer of the United States (U.S. CTO) and Assistant to the President, serving under President Barack Obama. She was previously a vice president at Google, leading new business development and early-stage partnerships across Google's global engineering and product teams at Google for nine years, was general manager of Google.org, a vice president briefly at Google[x] where she co-created Solve for X and WomenTechmakers, is the former CEO of Planet Out and worked as an engineer on early smartphones at General Magic. She serves on the boards of MIT and Vital Voices, was a member of the USAID Advisory Committee on Voluntary Aid and co-founded the Malala Fund.

== Early life and education ==
Smith grew up in Buffalo, New York, and Fort Erie, Ontario, and spent many summers at the Chautauqua Institution in Chautauqua, New York, where her mother, Joan Aspell Smith, was director of the Chautauqua Children's School. Smith graduated from City Honors School in 1982. She went on to receive her S.B. in 1986 and an S.M. in 1988, both in mechanical engineering, from Massachusetts Institute of Technology, and completed her master's thesis work at the MIT Media Lab. She was a member of the MIT student team that designed, built and raced a solar car 2000 miles across the Australian outback in the first cross-continental solar car race.

== Career ==
Following MIT, Smith worked at a variety of start-ups, including Apple in Tokyo and General Magic located in Mountain View, California, as product design lead on nascent smartphone technologies before she got involved with the launch of Planet Out in 1995. She joined formally in 1996 as COO and from 1998 she was Planet Out's Chief Executive Officer, where she expanded partnerships, built new business models, grew revenue and global users, raised venture funding, and later presided over that company's merger with Gay.com.

In 2003, she joined Google, where she rose to the vice president of new business development, leading early-stage partnerships, pilot explorations and technology licensing across Google's global engineering and product teams. She led many early acquisitions, including Keyhole (Google Earth), Where2Tech (Google Maps), and Picasa, and later also took over as general manager of Google's philanthropic arm, Google.org. Smith co-created and co-hosted Google's Solve for X solution acceleration programs 2012–14. In 2012, she started Google's "Women Techmakers" diversity initiative to expand visibility, community and resources for technical women globally.

In 2014, she left Google to become the 3rd U.S. CTO. In that role, Smith recruited top tech talent to serve across government collaborating on pressing issues, from AI, data science and open source, to inclusive economic growth, entrepreneurship, structural inequalities, government tech innovation capacity, STEM/STEAM engagement, workforce development, and criminal justice reform. Her teams focused on broad capacity building by co-creating all-hands-on-deck initiatives, including the public-private program TechHire, the Computer Science for All initiative, and the Image of STEM campaigns. In addition, she launched the campaign to #FindtheSentiments, which is an effort to find the Declaration of Sentiments, a piece of history from the Seneca Falls Convention. After leaving the White House in 2017, Smith became CEO and Founder of shift7 which works on tech-forward, inclusive innovation for faster impact on systemic economic, social, and environmental challenges. At shift7, the team continued co-creating the United Nations Solutions Summit and other programs; in 2017 Smith helped launch Tech Jobs Tour, aimed at promoting diversity in the technological sector, traveling to over 20 U.S. cities to help empower and connect local talent to their nascent tech sectors. Smith serves on the board of MIT, Vital Voices, LA2028, Think of Us as well as on the advisory boards for the MIT Media Lab and the Algorithmic Justice League. Additionally, she serves on the global Advisory Council for CFK Africa, a leading NGO working in Kenyan informal settlements. She is also a member of the Award Selection Committee for the distinguished Carroll L. Wilson Award at MIT. Smith has contributed to a broad range of engineering projects, including a bicycle lock, space station construction program, and solar cookstoves.

She is an active proponent of STEM education and innovation.

Her appeal for technologists to work in public service at the annual Grace Hopper Celebration of Women in Computing inspired several Harvard University students to create the national non-profit organization Coding it Forward which creates data science and technology internship program for undergraduate and graduate students in United States federal agencies.

Smith was elected a member of the National Academy of Engineering in 2017 for leading technological innovation teams and efforts to increase diversity and inclusion in STEM industries both nationally and globally, and elected a member of the Council on Foreign Relations in 2018.

== Recognition ==
- World Economic Forum Technology Pioneer 2001, 2002
- Listed by Out magazine in 2012 and 2013, as one of the 50 most powerful LGBT people in the United States
- Reuters Digital Vision Program Fellow at Stanford, 2003-2004
- Top 25 Women on the Web, 2000
- Upside Magazine 100 Digital Elite, 1999 and 2000
- Advertising Age i.20, 1999
- GLAAD Interactive Media Award for Internet Leadership, 1999
- Charging Buffalo Award, 2015
- Matrix Hall of Fame, 2015
- Business Insider 23 Most Powerful LGBTQ+ People in Tech, 2019

== Personal life ==
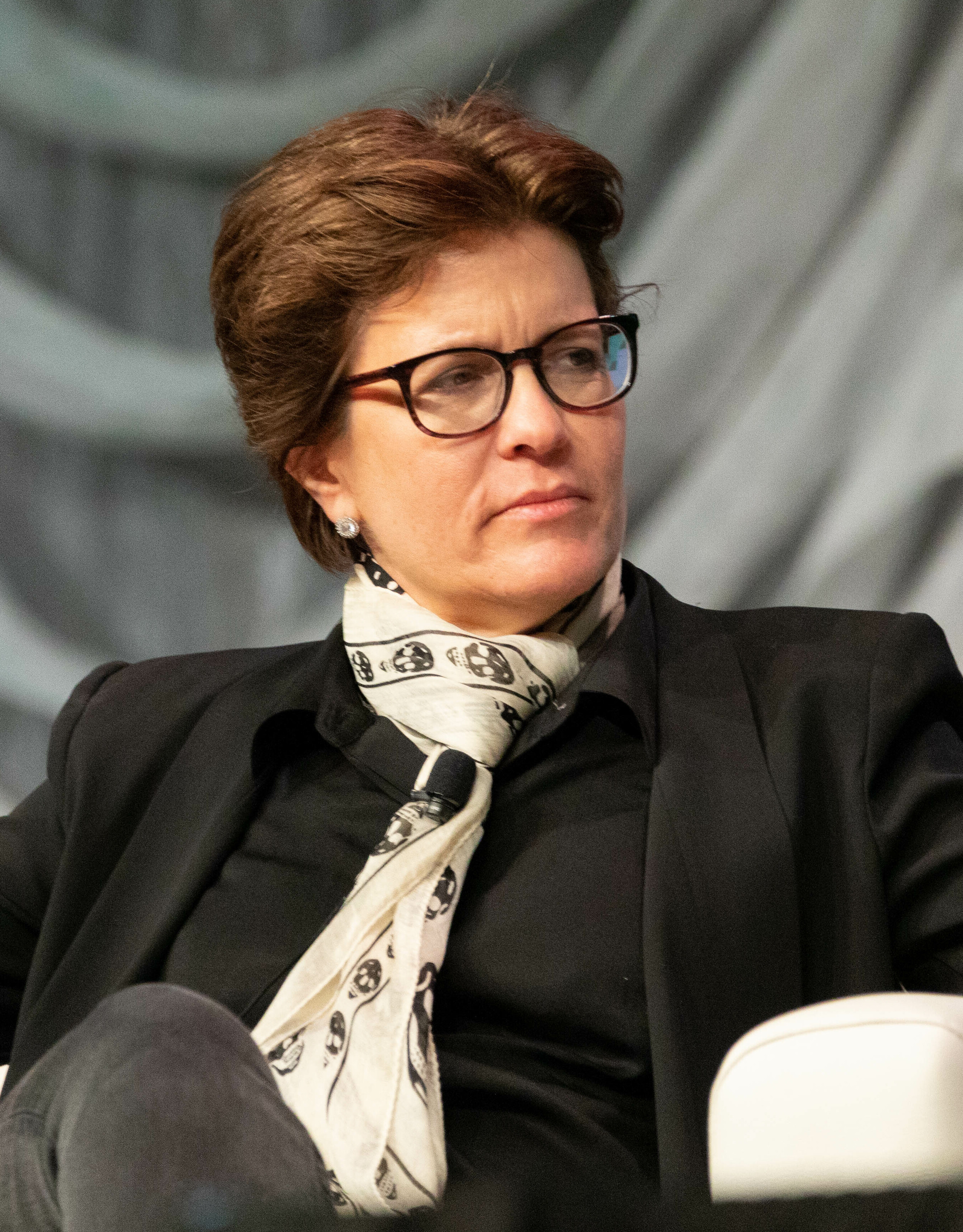
Smith was married to Kara Swisher from 1999 to 2017

Smith married technology columnist Kara Swisher in Marin County in 1999 at a time when same-sex marriage was not legal in California. They had additional legal wedding ceremonies in 2003 in Niagara Falls, Canada, in 2004 as part of the San Francisco 2004 same-sex weddings, and again in San Francisco, California in November 2008 in advance of California Proposition 8, which declared same-sex marriages invalid in California. Smith and Swisher have two sons. They separated in 2014, and were divorced as of 2017.
