= Chief Technology Officer of the United States =

Key technology policy advisor to the President of the United States

The United States chief technology officer (US CTO) is an official in the Office of Science and Technology Policy. The U.S. CTO helps the president and their team harness the power of technology and data to benefit all Americans. The CTO works closely with others both across and outside government on a broad range of work including bringing technology expertise to bear on federal policy and programs, and promoting values-driven technological innovation. The CTO and their team have historically focused on leveraging technology and technical expertise to help create jobs, strengthen privacy protections, harness the benefits and mitigate the risks of artificial intelligence, create paths to improve government services with lower costs, higher quality and increased transparency and accessibility, help upgrade agencies to use open data and expand their data science capabilities, improve quality and reduce the costs of health care and criminal justice, increase access to broadband, bring technical talent into government for policy and modern operations input, improve community innovation engagement by agencies working on local challenges, and help keep the nation secure.

== History ==
During the 2008 presidential campaign, Senator Barack Obama stated that he would appoint the first federal chief technology officer if elected to the presidency. Aneesh Chopra was named by President Obama as the nation's first CTO in April 2009, and confirmed by the Senate on August 7, 2009. Chopra resigned effective February 8, 2012, and was succeeded by Todd Park, formerly the CTO of the Department of Health and Human Services. On September 4, 2014, Megan Smith was named as the CTO. President Trump named Michael Kratsios as U.S. CTO in May 2019, and he was unanimously confirmed by the United States Senate on August 1, 2019. For the duration of his presidency, President Biden left the CTO role unfilled. On March 10, 2025, President Trump nominated Ethan Klein to be U.S. CTO.

No.	Name	Start	End	Ref.	President
1	Aneesh Chopra	May 2009	February 2012		Barack Obama (2009–2017)
2	Todd Park	March 1, 2012	August 28, 2014		Barack Obama (2009–2017)
3	Megan Smith	September 4, 2014	January 20, 2017		Barack Obama (2009–2017)
Acting	Michael Kratsios	January 20, 2017	August 2, 2019		Donald Trump (2017–2021)
4	Michael Kratsios	August 2, 2019	January 20, 2021		Donald Trump (2017–2021)
	None (Principal Deputy CTOs: Alexander Macgillivray, Deirdre Mulligan)	January 20, 2021	January 15, 2025		Joe Biden (2021–2025)
5	Ethan Klein	January 16, 2026			Donald Trump (2025–)

== See also ==
- Chief Information Officer of the United States
- Chief Technology Officer of the Department of Health and Human Services
- Science Advisor to the President

== Notes ==
1. Aneesh Chopra and Michael Kratsios were confirmed by the Senate because the also held roles as OSTP Assistant Director and Director respectively. Todd Park and Megan Smith were not required to be Senate confirmed. Legislation in January 2017 formalized the role of U.S.CTO, which now includes Senate confirmation as standard practice.
