= Open Data Now =

2014 book by Joel Gurin

- Author: Joel Gurin
- Subject: Internet censorship
- Publisher: McGraw-Hill Education
- Publication date: 2014
- Publication place: United States
- Pages: 330
- ISBN: 978-0-07-182977-9

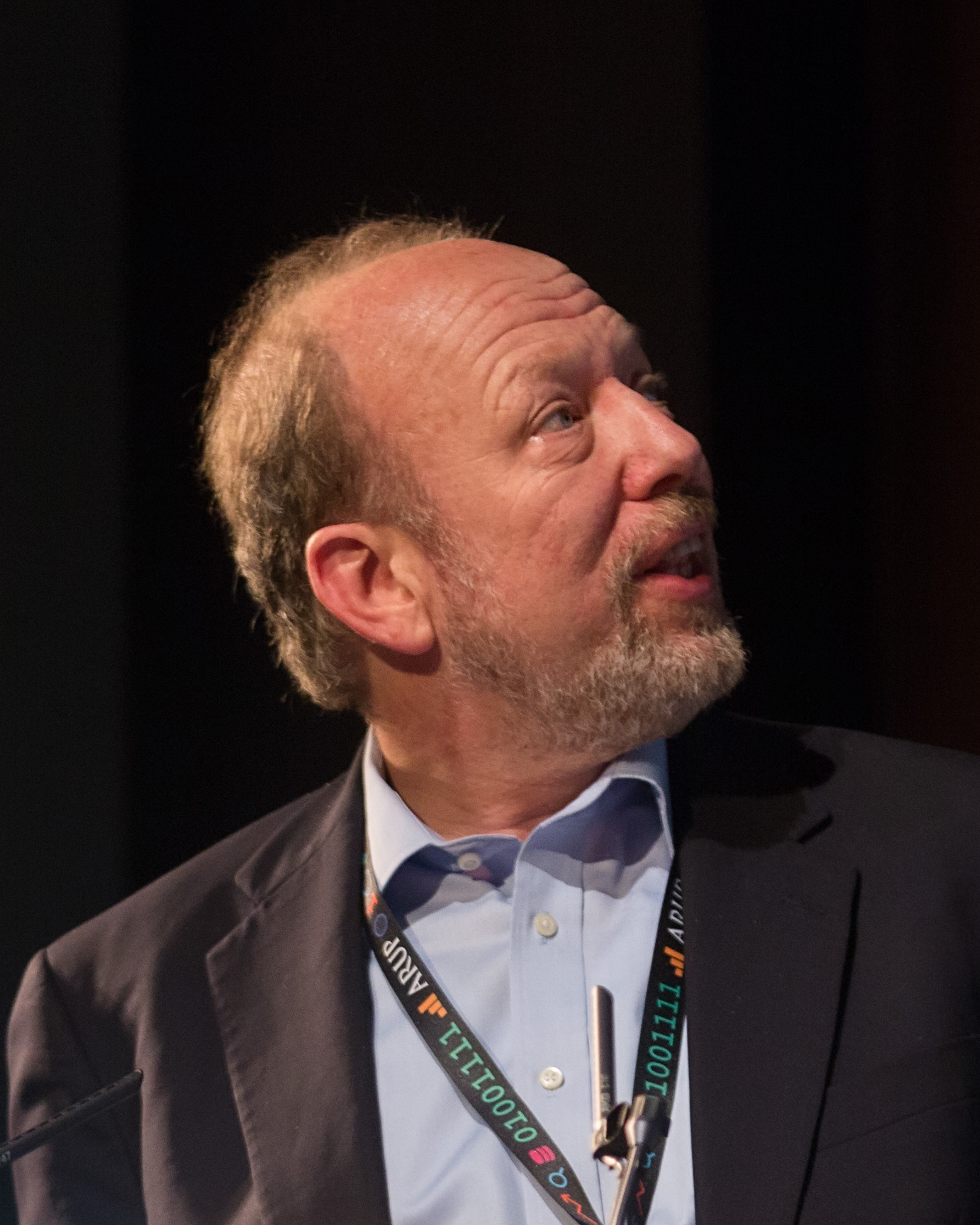
Gurin in November 2014

Open Data Now is a 2014 book on open data by Joel Gurin.

== Reception ==
A reviewer for the University of California, Berkeley School of Information said the book "is written for the business community, but speaks to the experiences of those in the government, the private sector, or those who make a living advocating for consumers."

A reviewer for the U.S. Chamber of Commerce Foundation says, "Gurin’s snapshot of Open Data's innovators also serve as an effective guidebook." That reviewer also notes interest in the book's claim, "If Open Data is free, how can anyone build a business on it? The answer is that Open Data is the starting point, not the end point, in deriving value from information. In general, governments have focused more on making the data itself available than on public-facing applications. The private sector can then add value by taking Open Data and building something great with it."

Andy Oram, a reviewer for O'Reilly Media, described how the book focused on the cost of data.

== Summary ==
Open Data can best be described as accessible public data that people, companies, and organizations can use to launch new ventures, analyze patterns and trends, make data-driven decisions, and solve complex problems.

— Open Data Now, page 9

The book is divided into two parts, each of which has chapters.

=== Part 1 ===
An opportunity as big as the web

The author profiles the Open Data Institute, Open Knowledge, and the National Security Agency as organizations working in open data. Definitions are presented for open data and big data. The book is outlined as discussing four business implications for the advent of open data - it will be the product basis for many startup companies and change the nature of investment, marketing, and innovation.

There is a review of the history of open data. United States weather and GPS data are described as free data which have become the basis for new industries generating billions of dollars. Data.gov is presented as a repository of more information which is likely to similarly create new businesses and products.

Hot Startups - Turning Government Data into Dollars

The chapter presents a history of open data in the United States. Google, Foursquare, Uber, Waze, Instagram, and Flickr are profiled as companies who have created products which have a basis in the use of GPS open data which they use in their mapping services.

The author interviews one of the founders of The Climate Corporation. There is a report from a Health Datapalooza.

Consumer Websites - Choice Engines for Smart Disclosure

The author defines a term, "smart disclosure", to mean the combination of government, company, and user information to curate whatever information a consumer would need to make a purchase decision. Another concept, "choice engine", is discussed to mean a filter of all available choices that an individual might make (perhaps in deciding to purchase a product), screened to take into account everything that a shopper might consider when they want and making a final, accurate recommendation which meets the purchaser's need and is less influenced by advertising. The author talks about his work role at the Federal Communications Commission, where he was tasked with promoting consumer empowerment in the marketplace. Their department believed that the public would benefit when both it had access to more marketplace information, and also when that marketplace information was presented in more relevant ways that personally mattered to each individual.

There is a review of the work of Todd Park. Companies profiled here include Opower, Zillow, GreenButton, and M-Labs.

New Companies to Manage the Data Deluge

Topics covered include Digital Accountability and Transparency Act of 2014 and HealthCare.gov.

Companies mentioned include SAP SE, SAS Institute, and Esri.

Data-Driven Investing - New Tools for Business Analysis

An overview is given of open data and the U.S. Securities and Exchange Commission, EDGAR, and XBRL.

Green Investing - Betting on Sustainability Data

Organizations profiled include the Carbon Disclosure Project, Unilever, and GoodGuide. There is some discussion of the Dodd–Frank Wall Street Reform and Consumer Protection Act.

Savvy Marketing - How Reputational Data Defines your Brand

There is a discussion of bill shock and why and how it occurs. The Consumer Financial Protection Bureau is presented. The concept of a user review is discussed.

The Marketing Science of Sentiment Analysis

Reputation management, review websites, and more about user reviews is presented. Content analysis and sentiment analysis are described as fields of research in evaluating reviews.

Tapping the Crowd for Fast Innovation

The author presents two models for crowdsourcing. Consider a project organizer who wishes to recruit people to accomplish some task. One method for crowdsourcing could be to sort through a crowd, but identify a small set of people who have expert skills, and then provide special support to encourage them to engage with a project. A project example with this model might be a government convening a funded contest. In another crowdsourcing model, a project organization might provide a little support which is available universally, in hopes that the public will contribute to the project without individuals being given personal attention from the project organizer. Zooniverse is an example of this model with less personal support.

Stack Exchange, TechCrunch, Wikipedia, and InfoArmy are profiled.

The Open Research Lab - Innovating through Open Collaboration

Reviews of The Wisdom of Crowds and Reinventing Discovery are given. The concept of open science is presented. Profiles of Rufus Pollock and Aaron Swartz are given. The Human Genome Project, PatientsLikeMe, AllTrials, The Cost of Knowledge, Access2Research, and PLOS are profiled. There is a lot of discussion of how open access relates to many other fields.

=== Part 2 ===
Privacy, Security, and the Value of Personal Data

The Global surveillance disclosures (2013–present) are described. Concepts of personally identifiable information, privacy, and information privacy are discussed. Alex Pentland's 2009 idea "New Deal on Data" is given as an example of a usable privacy policy. Reputation.com is given as a case study on personal data services.

Doing Business in a See-Through Society

Sunlight Foundation, Global Witness, Project On Government Oversight, mySociety, ProPublica, and Center for Public Integrity are profiled as organizations which use open data to encourage commentary on business practices.

Government and Data – Setting the Rules for an Open World

There is more coverage of the Digital Accountability and Transparency Act of 2014, mentioned elsewhere in the book, and here the law's close relationship with President Obama's public image is discussed. The US Freedom of Information Act is explained. A call is made to establish a Consumer Privacy Bill of Rights.

The Open Data Future

Lists of advice are given for different kinds of businesses. Advice for small companies includes identifying open data marketing opportunities where there is little competition. Advice for larger companies includes starting to share and use open data immediately, so that the company can begin to grow a culture of discussing the concept.
