= Reaser =

Reaser is a surname. Notable people with the surname include:

- Atoosa Reaser, American politician
- Elizabeth Reaser (born 1975), American actress
- Keith Reaser (born 1991), American football player
