= Senator Fletcher =

Senator Fletcher may refer to:

- Allen M. Fletcher (1853–1922), Vermont State Senate
- Duncan U. Fletcher (1859–1936), U.S. Senator from Florida
- Ed Fletcher (1872–1955), California State Senate
- George Latham Fletcher (1874–1929), Virginia State Senate
- Henry A. Fletcher (1839–1897), Vermont State Senate
- Thomas Fletcher (Arkansas politician) (1817–1880), Arkansas State Senate
