= Virginia Secretary of Technology =

Secretary of Technology of the Commonwealth of Virginia
- Member of: Virginia Governor's Cabinet (former)
- Nominator: The governor
- Appointer: The governor with advice and consent from the Senate and House
- Term length: 4 years
- Formation: May 21, 1998
- First holder: Donald Upson
- Final holder: Karen Jackson (Office absorbed into the Secretariat of Commerce and Trade)
- Abolished: January 13, 2018

The secretary of technology is a former member of the Virginia Governor's Cabinet. The office was last held by Karen Jackson. The secretary oversaw the Virginia Information Technologies Agency and Virginia Center for Innovative Technology. It was absorbed into the Secretariat of Commerce and Trade in 2018 under Governor Ralph Northam.

== List of secretaries of technology ==
- Donald Upson (1998–2002)
- George Newstrom (2002–2004)
- Eugene Huang (2004–2006)
- Aneesh Chopra (2006–2009)
- Leonard Pomata (2009–2010)
- Jim Duffey (2010–2014)
- Karen Jackson (2014–2018)
