= Leonard Pomata =

American politician

5th Virginia Secretary of Technology
- In office June 7, 2009 – January 16, 2010
- Governor: Tim Kaine
- Preceded by: Aneesh Chopra
- Succeeded by: Jim Duffey

Chief Information Officer of Virginia
- In office June 10, 2009 – August 20, 2009
- Governor: Tim Kaine
- Preceded by: Lemuel Stewart Jr.
- Succeeded by: George F. Coulter

Personal details
- Born: November 6, 1945 (age 80)
- Spouse: Ginger Baldwin
- Education: New York University (BS, MS)

Leonard M. "Len" Pomata (born November 6, 1945) is a former Virginia Secretary of Technology. He was appointed by Governor Tim Kaine following the resignation of Aneesh Chopra to become Chief Technology Officer of the United States in 2009. He received a B.S. degree in electrical engineering from the Brooklyn Polytechnic Institute (now part of the New York University Tandon School of Engineering) and a master's degree from NYU. He was controversially made the state's interim Chief Information Officer, head of the Virginia Information Technologies Agency after incumbent Lemuel Stewart, Jr. was ousted over a contract dispute.

Political offices
Preceded by Aneesh Chopra	Virginia Secretary of Technology; 2009–2010	Succeeded by Jim Duffey
