= Senator Pilcher =

Senator Pilcher may refer to:

- J. L. Pilcher (1898–1981), Georgia State Senate
- Theodore C. Pilcher (1844–1917), Virginia State Senate

== See also ==
- Mary Pilcher-Cook (born 1954), Kansas State Senate
