= Lucien Keith =

American politician (1860–1933)

Member of the Virginia Senate from the 11th district
- In office January 9, 1918 – January 14, 1920
- Preceded by: Theodore C. Pilcher
- Succeeded by: J. Bradshaw Beverley

Personal details
- Born: March 31, 1860 Fauquier County, Virginia, U.S.
- Died: March 16, 1933 (aged 72) Woodburne, Fauquier County, Virginia, U.S.
- Party: Democratic
- Spouse: Elizabeth Sharpless (died 1920)
- Relatives: James Keith (uncle)
- Education: University of Virginia
- Occupation: Politician; lawyer; judge

Lucien Keith (March 31, 1860 – March 16, 1933) was an American Democratic politician who served as a member of the Virginia Senate from 1918 to 1920.

== Early life ==
Lucien Keith was one of ten children born to Sarah (née Blackwell) and Isham Keith. His uncle was Virginia chief justice James Keith. His grandfather, Isham Keith (1801–1863), served as a member of the Virginia House of Delegates in 1843.

== Career ==
Keith practiced law in Fairfax, Virginia, and moved his practice to Anniston, Alabama. He returned to live in Warrenton, Virginia, in 1909.

Keith was mayor of Warrenton twice. He was a judge of the Juvenile and Domestic Relations Court in Richmond. He served one term in the Virginia Senate, representing Fauquier and Loudoun counties from 1918 to 1920.

== Personal life ==
Keith married Elizabeth Sharpless of Philadelphia. She died in 1920. He died on March 16, 1933, aged 73, at his home in Woodburne, Fauquier County.

Senate of Virginia
Preceded by Theodore C. Pilcher	Virginia Senator for the 11th District; 1918–1920	Succeeded by J. Bradshaw Beverley
