= Virginia's 27th House of Delegates district =

Virginia legislative district

Virginia's 26th State House of Delegates district
- District map from the 2023 election
Delegate
Atoosa Reaser; D–Sterling
- Demographics: 45.2% White; 7.1% Black; 26.2% Hispanic; 19.5% Asian; 15.2% Other
- Population (2024) • Voting age: 86,085; 18
- Registered voters (2024): 53,919

Virginia's 27th House of Delegates district elects one of 100 seats in the Virginia House of Delegates, the lower house of the state's bicameral legislature. District 27 represented part of Chesterfield County, Virginia until redistricting during the 2020 cycle. District 27 now represents the far eastern part of Loudoun County in Northern Virginia. Since 2024, the seat has been held by Democrat Atoosa Reaser.

== District officeholders ==
Years	Delegate	Party	Counties represented	Electoral history
January 11, 1984 – January 8, 1986	Phoebe M. Orebaugh	Republican		
January 8, 1986 – January 13, 1988	Paul Cline	Republican		
January 13, 1988 – January 8, 1992	Phoebe M. Orebaugh	Republican		
January 13, 1988 – March 10, 1994	Steve Martin	Republican		Resigned; Elected to the Senate of Virginia
March 10, 1994 – April 4, 2010	Samuel A. Nixon	Republican		Resigned; Appointed Chief Information Officer of Virginia
June 2010 – January 2024	Roxann Robinson	Republican	Chesterfield	Elected via special election. Redistricted to the 73rd district and retired.
January 2024 – present	Atoosa Reaser	Democratic	Loudoun	New seat following redistricting.
