= Samuel Nixon =

Samuel Nixon may refer to:

- Samuel F. Nixon (1848–1918), American theater owner
- Samuel A. Nixon (born 1958), American politician
- Samuel Nixon (artist) (1804–1854), British sculptor
- Thomas Bayne (Sam Nixon) (1824–1888), American dentist and Virginia politician
- Sam Nixon (rugby union) (born 1996), English rugby union player

== See also ==
- Sam Nixon, English singer and television presenter
