= George Latham Fletcher =

American jurist and politician

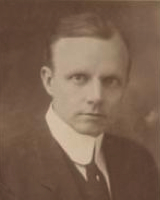

Member of the Virginia Senate from the 11th district
- In office January 8, 1908 – January 12, 1916
- Preceded by: George T. Ford
- Succeeded by: Theodore C. Pilcher

Personal details
- Born: George Latham Fletcher; May 19, 1874 Warrenton, Virginia, U.S.
- Died: March 3, 1929 (aged 54) Fauquier, Virginia, U.S.
- Party: Democratic
- Spouse: Frances Moore
- Education: Richmond College; University of Virginia

George Latham Fletcher (May 19, 1874 – March 23, 1929) was an American jurist and Democratic politician. George L. Fletcher studied law at the University of Virginia. After graduation in 1898, Fletcher practiced law.

Prior to spending a number of years as a state circuit court judge, he served as a member of the Virginia Senate, representing the state's 11th district from 1908 to 1916. Fletcher's father-in-law was Marshall F. Moore, a Union military officer and former governor of Washington Territory.

Senate of Virginia
Preceded by George T. Ford	Virginia Senator for the 11th District; 1908–1916	Succeeded by Theodore C. Pilcher
