= Theodore C. Pilcher =

American politician

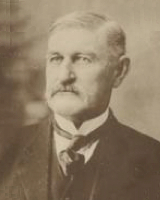
- Official portrait, 1916

Member of the Virginia Senate from the 11th district
- In office January 12, 1916 – December 7, 1917
- Preceded by: G. Latham Fletcher
- Succeeded by: Lucien Keith

Member of the Virginia House of Delegates from Fauquier County
- In office December 2, 1891 – December 4, 1901
- Preceded by: Julius A. Pilcher
- Succeeded by: Moses M. Green

Personal details
- Born: Theodore Clay Pilcher; March 20, 1844 Warrenton, Virginia, U.S.
- Died: December 7, 1917 (aged 73) Warrenton, Virginia, U.S.
- Party: Democratic
- Spouse: Ada George (m. 1867; died 1910)

Military service
- Allegiance: Confederate States
- Branch/service: Confederate States Army
- Years of service: 1863–1865
- Rank: Private
- Unit: 4th Virginia Cavalry
- Battles/wars: American Civil War

Theodore Clay Pilcher (March 20, 1844 – December 7, 1917) was an American Democratic politician who served as a member of the Virginia Senate, representing the state's 11th district from 1916 until his death just under two years later. From 1891 to 1901, he represented Fauquier County in the House of Delegates.

== Early life and military service ==
Pilcher was born in Warrenton, Virginia on March 20, 1844. He was the fourth and youngest child of Alexander Spottswood Pilcher, a farmer and Frances Pitt Pilcher (née Shumate).

On February 5, 1863, at the age of eighteen, Pilcher enlisted in the Confederate States Army, wishing to fight in the ongoing American Civil War. He served as a private with Company H of the 4th Virginia Cavalry Regiment, also known as the "Black Horse Cavalry," until the end of the war two years later.

== Career ==
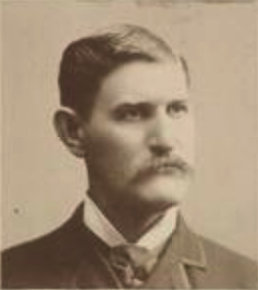
Delegate Pilcher, 1891

Pilcher first held political office in 1891 when he was elected as a Democrat to represent Fauquier County in the Virginia House of Delegates. After this, he represented his home county for four subsequent two-year terms. He succeeded his older brother, Julius, who served two terms in that position. In 1901, Pilcher retired to his farm, spending the next fourteen years mostly staying out of politics.

In 1915, Pilcher reentered public life, making a run for the 11th district seat in the Virginia state senate. He was successful, representing the district, which was then composed of Fauquier and Loudoun, during the General Assembly's 1916 session.

Pilcher died in his hometown on December 7, 1917. His replacement in the Senate, Lucien Keith was sworn in on the first day of the General Assembly's next session, January 10, 1918, and the body was later that day adjourned in his memory.

== Personal life ==
Pilcher married Ada George on December 5, 1867. The couple had two sons, John and George. George's eldest son (also named Theodore Clay) represented Norfolk City in the House of Delegates from 1954 to 1965.

Pilcher is buried in Midland Cemetery in Fauquier.

Virginia House of Delegates
Preceded by Julius A. Pilcher	Virginia Delegate for Fauquier County; 1891–1901	Succeeded by Moses M. Green
Senate of Virginia
Preceded by G. Latham Fletcher	Virginia Senator for the 11th District; 1916–1917	Succeeded by Lucien Keith
