= Epocrates =

Medical reference application

epocrates
- Company type: Private
- Traded as: Nasdaq: EPOC
- Founded: January 1, 1998; 28 years ago
- Headquarters: San Mateo, United States
- Revenue: $93.7 million (2009) $83.3 million (2008)
- Website: www.epocrates.com

epocrates is a widely used mobile medical reference application that provides healthcare professionals with access to clinical information at the point of care. The software is designed to assist physicians, pharmacists, nurse practitioners, physician assistants and other healthcare providers in making informed decisions about drug interactions, medical calculations, diagnosis and treatment options. It was initially developed as a Palm Pilot application in 1998 and has since evolved into a comprehensive medical resource available on various platforms.

== History ==
Founded in 1998 by three Stanford Business School students, early versions of Epocrates ran on Palm devices and desktop computers. By 2006, the user base had reached an estimated 525,000 users worldwide, including 200,000 doctors in the United States. Upon the introduction of the Apple iPhone, Epocrates became the first medical app on Apple's mobile platform.

Early funding partners [AM1] included Bay City Capital, Draper Fisher Jurvetson, Interwest Partners, Sprout Group, and Three Arch Partners.

In 2010, the company grew to more than 250 employees and surpassed 1 million users worldwide, including 40% of the physicians in the United States.

On January 7, 2013, it was announced that athenahealth would acquire Epocrates for about $293 million.

In February 2022, Matt Titus was appointed as COO.

== Products ==
The Epocrates app is designed for physicians and other healthcare professionals for use at the point of care. App users check drug dosing, drug interactions, drug safety details, medical news, disease diagnosis and management guidance, as well as evidence-based clinical practice guidelines.

athenahealth markets free and paid subscription versions of the app, which are available from Google Play or the App Store.
