= Jim Duffey =

6th Virginia Secretary of Technology
- In office January 16, 2010 – January 11, 2014
- Governor: Bob McDonnell
- Preceded by: Leonard Pomata
- Succeeded by: Karen Jackson

Personal details
- Born: James Donald Duffey Jr. June 6, 1950 Cambridge, Massachusetts, United States
- Died: September 10, 2019 (aged 69) Washington, D.C., United States
- Spouse: Deborah Jean Floyd
- Education: University of Virginia (BA); New England Law Boston (JD)
- Occupation: Lawyer; government official; consultant

James Donald Duffey Jr. (June 6, 1950 – September 10, 2019) was the Virginia Secretary of Technology from 2010 to 2014, serving under Governor Bob McDonnell. At the time of his appointment, he was president and CEO of Duff Consulting, which he founded after 24 years at Electronic Data Systems, and was vice chairman of the Northern Virginia Technology Council.

Duffey died on September 10, 2019, in Washington, D.C. At the time of his death, he was a residence of McLean, Virginia.

Political offices
Preceded by Leonard Pomata	Virginia Secretary of Technology; 2010–2014	Succeeded by Karen Jackson
