= James Keith (Virginia judge) =

American judge (1839–1918)

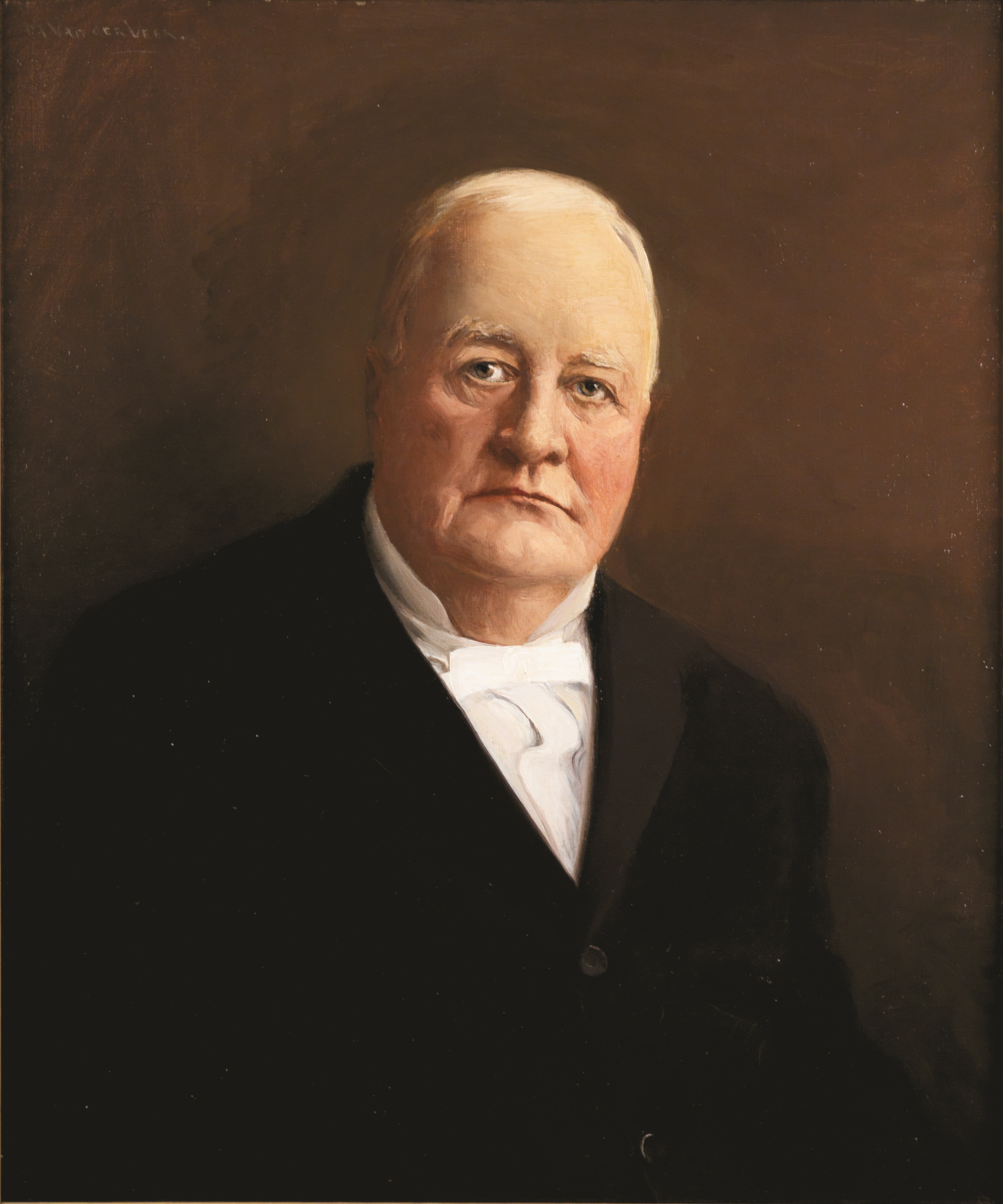
- Oil on canvas portrait of Justice Keith, by Mary Van der Veer

Justice of the Supreme Court of Virginia
- In office 1895–1916

Member of the Virginia House of Delegates from the Fauquier County district
- In office 1869–1879

Personal details
- Born: September 7, 1839 Fauquier County, Virginia, U.S.
- Died: January 2, 1918 (aged 78) Richmond, Virginia, U.S.
- Resting place: Hollywood Cemetery
- Party: Democratic
- Spouse(s): Lilias Gordon Morson (m. 1872; died 1877) Frances Backsdale Morson (m. 1878)
- Children: 2
- Relatives: Lucien Keith (nephew); William Randolph (great-great-grandson); John Marshall; Scott Shipp
- Education: University of Virginia

Military service
- Allegiance: Confederate States of America
- Years of service: 1861–1865
- Unit: 4th Virginia Cavalry
- Battles/wars: American Civil War

James Keith (September 7, 1839 – January 2, 1918) was a Virginia lawyer, soldier, politician and judge, who served as the chief judge of the Supreme Court of Virginia (then called the Supreme Court of Appeals) from 1895 to 1916.

== Early and family life ==
Born in Fauquier County, Virginia on September 7, 1839, James Keith was born to Circuit Judge Isham Keith (1798–1863) and his wife, the former Julia Chilton. He was the great-great-grandson of William Randolph and a direct descendant of Chief Justice John Marshall. Keith received his early education in local schools and studied law under Professor John B. Minor at the University of Virginia. He graduated in 1860 and studied law in the office of John M. Forbes.

Keith was a cousin of judge R. Carter Scott and was related to General Scott Shipp. His grandfather, Thomas Keith, fought in the American Revolutionary War. His nephew was state senator Lucien Keith. His father also owned a woolen mill at Waterloo. In 1860, Isham Keith owned 17 enslaved people, and his son James also may have owned at least one slave.

In 1872, Keith married Lilias Gordon Morson, daughter of lawyer Arthur Alexander Morson, of Warrenton. She died in 1877 and in 1887, he married the sister of his first wife, Frances Barksdale Morson. They had two children, Juliet and Morson.

== American Civil War ==
During the American Civil War, James Keith and his older brother Isham Keith Jr. (1833–1902) enlisted as privates in Company H of the Black Horse Cavalry and served for the duration. James Keith was promoted to adjutant on December 7, 1863. After surrendering at Appomattox Court House, he was paroled at Winchester on May 30, 1865, and received a presidential pardon on August 19, 1865.

== Postwar ==
After the war, James Keith resumed his law studies under Forbes, a prominent lawyer in Warrenton. Fauquier County voters elected Keith to the Virginia House of Delegates in 1869 and he served in the session of 1869—70. In late 1870, he was elected as judge of the Eleventh Judicial Circuit, composed of Alexandria, Fauquier, Fairfax, Loudoun, Prince William and Rappahannock counties.

Keith served as circuit judge until January 1, 1895, when legislators elected him to the Supreme Court of Appeals, and his fellow judges elected him their president (chief judge) soon afterwards. He continued as a judge and president until he retired on June 10, 1916.

He was active in the United Confederate Veterans and presented a portrait of Fauquier County's General (and later U.S. Congressman and Senator Eppa Hunton to the Richmond chapter.

== Death and legacy ==
Keith died of pneumonia on January 2, 1918, at his home at Cathedral Place in Richmond. He was buried at Richmond's Hollywood Cemetery. The Library of Virginia maintains his official papers. The Virginia Historical Society has some Keith family papers, maintained by Fanny Scott, the wife of Virginia Attorney General Robert Taylor Scott, and who led the Black Horse Chapter of the United Daughters of the Confederacy at Warrenton (the unit which had both sons of Judge Isham, and where that Judge Keith died and was buried).
