= Karen Jackson =

American politician

7th Virginia Secretary of Technology
- In office January 11, 2014 – January 13, 2018
- Governor: Terry McAuliffe
- Preceded by: Jim Duffey
- Succeeded by: None (office dissolved)

Personal details
- Born: Karen Rollins Jackson Newport News, Virginia, U.S.
- Education: Christopher Newport University; College of William & Mary

Karen Rollins Jackson is a former Virginia Secretary of Technology. Appointed in 2014 by Governor Terry McAuliffe, she was the last to serve in the office before it was dissolved under Governor Ralph Northam. She previously served from 2009 to 2014 as Deputy Secretary of Technology under Governors Tim Kaine and Bob McDonnell. Jackson was born in Newport News, Virginia and was raised in Poquoson. She attended Christopher Newport University, graduating in 1987, and received a Master in Business Administration degree from the College of William & Mary.

Political offices
Preceded by Jim Duffey	Virginia Secretary of Technology; 2014–present	Succeeded by Incumbent
