= Phoebe M. Orebaugh =

American teacher and politician

Member of the Virginia House of Delegates from the 27th district
- In office January 13, 1988 – January 8, 1992
- Preceded by: Paul Cline
- Succeeded by: Steve Martin
- In office January 11, 1984 – January 8, 1986
- Preceded by: Robert Beasley Jones
- Succeeded by: Paul Cline

Personal details
- Born: Phoebe Carolyn May; August 26, 1935 (age 91) Rockingham County, Virginia, U.S.
- Party: Republican
- Spouse: Robert Orebaugh
- Education: Bridgewater College
- Occupation: teacher

Phoebe May Orebaugh (born August 25, 1935) is a retired American teacher and politician of the Republican Party. She represented the 27th district, consisting of the City of Harrisonburg and part of her native Rockingham County in the Virginia House of Delegates from 1983–1986 and 1988-1992.

== Early and family life ==
Born during the Great Depression in Rockingham County, Virginia, Orebaugh attended the local public schools and graduated from Broadway High School. She then attended Bridgewater College beginning in 1952 and received a bachelor's degree in French in 1955. She married Robert Orebaugh in 1958, but they later divorced.

== Career ==
Orebaugh returned to Rockingham County and her alma mater, Broadway High School, and for 35 years taught courses including French, English, government, and U.S. and world history before retiring in 1990. She was also active in the local Chamber of Commerce, AARP, Harrisonburg-Rockingham Historical Society, National Council of Social Studies, Delta Kappa Gamma sorority, and her parish Church of the Brethren.

Active in Republican and conservative politics, Orebaugh defeated Rockingham attorney Roger Ritchie to win election to the Virginia House of Delegates in 1982, following court-mandated single-member districts. Until redistricting following the 1980 census, the 27th district had previously been to the east, and Democrat and Dinwiddie High School principal retired and his Democratic co-delegate Norman Sisisky ran in what became the 4th district. Shortly before the 1985 election, severe floods devastated western Virginia, including Orebaugh's home town, Broadway, destroying printed voter lists as well as suppressing turnout. She lost to James Madison University political science professor Paul Cline, the Democratic candidate. However, she defeated Cline two years later.

Following the 1990 census, redistricting by the Democratic-majority legislature put fourteen Republican incumbents in districts with another Republican incumbent. Orebaugh was one of those challenging the redistricting as a gerrymander, but the federal district judge found they had not met the burden of proof sufficient to win an injunction. Orebaugh chose to retire from the legislature rather than contest Chesterfield County insurance agent and veteran delegate Steve Martin in the Republican primary. He went on to win the general election and later won election to the Senate of Virginia. Orebaugh considered a run for Congress from Virginia's 6th congressional district in 1992, but ultimately decided against it.

== Legacy ==
Orebaugh donated her papers through 2001 to her alma mater, Bridgewater College.
