= Roxann Robinson =

American politician

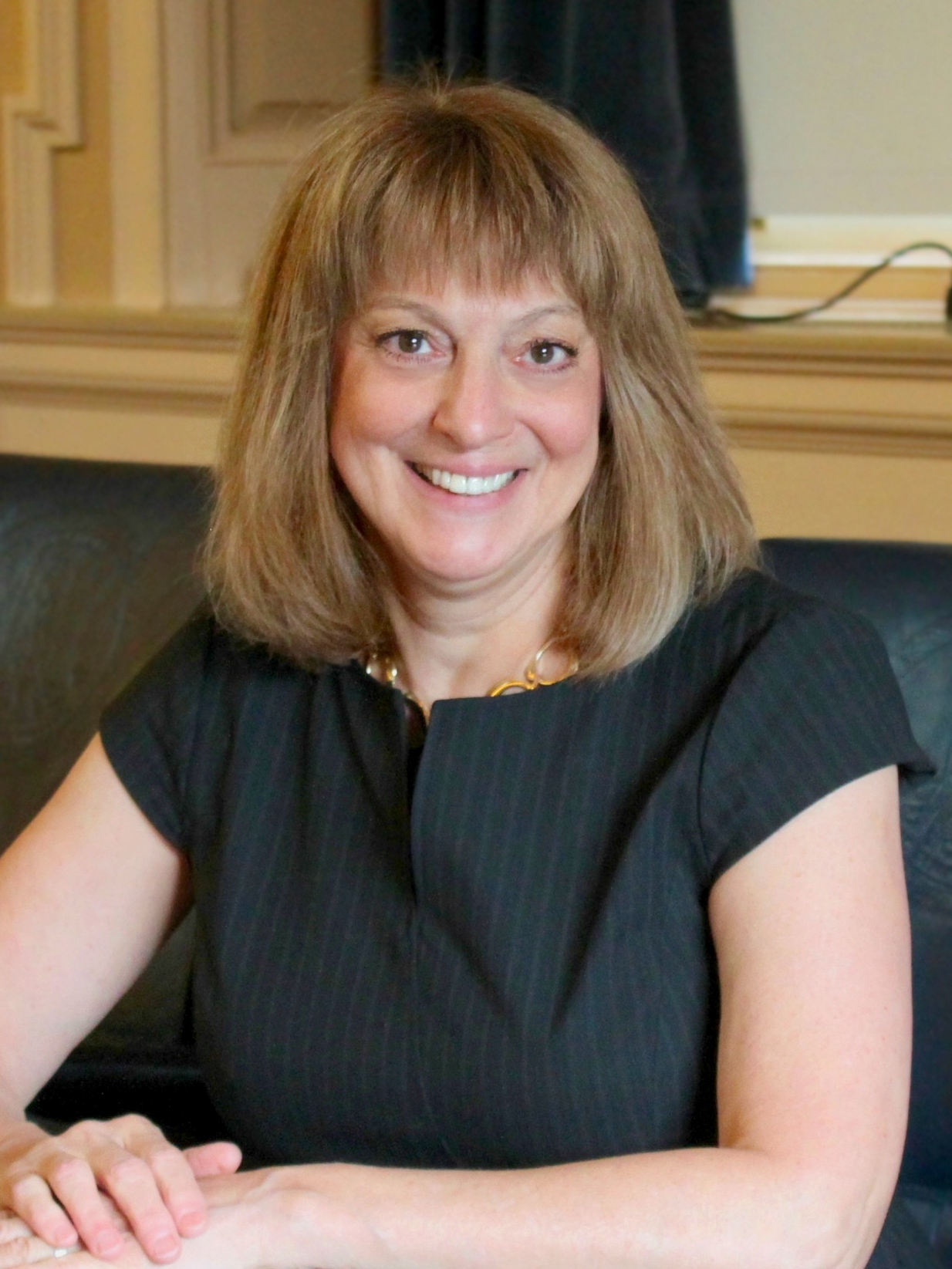

Member of the Virginia House of Delegates from the 27th district district
- In office June 24, 2010 – January 10, 2024
- Preceded by: Samuel A. Nixon
- Succeeded by: Atoosa Reaser (redistricting)

Personal details
- Born: January 11, 1956 (age 70) Weirton, West Virginia
- Party: Republican
- Spouse: Michael Earl Lind
- Education: Fairmont State College; Illinois College of Optometry
- Occupation: Optometrist
- Committees: Appropriations, Education, Science and Technology (chair)
- Website: www.roxannrobinson.com

Roxann L. Robinson (born January 11, 1956, in Weirton, West Virginia) is an American politician. A Republican, she was elected to the Virginia House of Delegates in 2010. She represented the 27th district, in Chesterfield County, in the southern suburbs of Richmond.

== Early life, education, business career ==
Robinson graduated from Brooke High School in Wellsburg, West Virginia, in 1974. She received a B.S. degree in biology from Fairmont State College in 1978. She then attended the Illinois College of Optometry, where she earned a B.S. in visual science and an O.D.

Robinson married Michael Earl Lind, c. 1985. They settled in Chesterfield County, where she established an optometry practice.

== Virginia House of Delegates ==
On March 24, 2010, Governor Bob McDonnell appointed the 27th district incumbent, Republican Samuel A. Nixon, as Virginia's Chief Information Officer. Robinson became the Republican nominee to succeed Nixon. She defeated Democrat William Brown, a county planning commissioner, in a special election on June 15, receiving 72% of the vote. Robinson was unopposed for reelection in 2011 and 2013.

In 2017, Robinson was opposed by Democrat Larry Barnett. The race was too close to call on election night, but Barnett conceded two days later, and Robinson won re-election by an estimated margin of 124 votes.

In the 2018 Legislative Session, Robinson was appointed to chairman of the House Science and Technology Committee.

In 2022, Robinson was promoted to chair of the Finance Committee.
