= Aneesh Chopra =

American executive

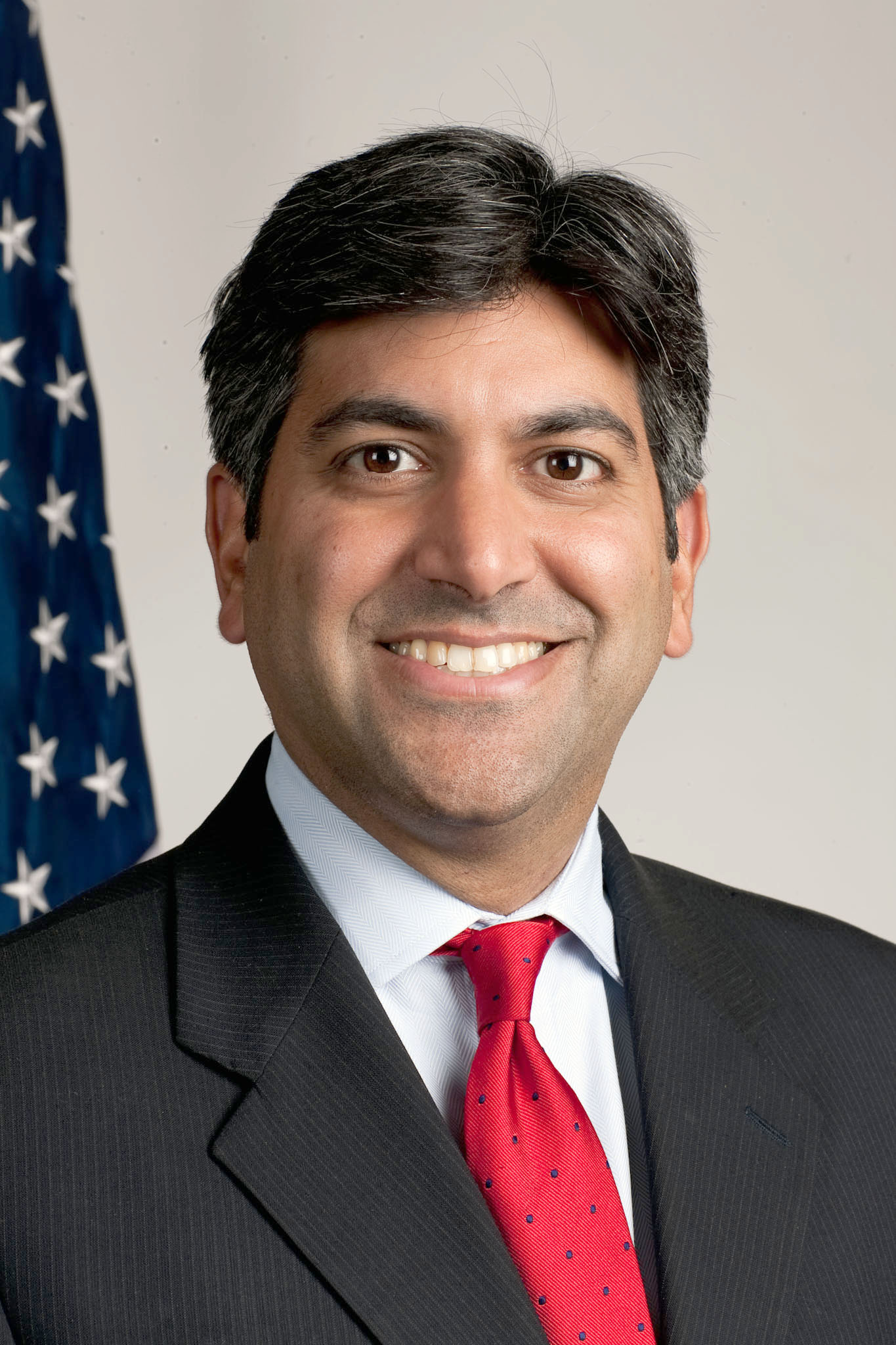

1st Chief Technology Officer of the United States
- In office May 2009 – February 2012
- President: Barack Obama
- Preceded by: Position established
- Succeeded by: Todd Park

4th Virginia Secretary of Technology
- In office January 14, 2006 – April 2009
- Governor: Tim Kaine
- Preceded by: Eugene Huang
- Succeeded by: Leonard Pomata

Personal details
- Born: July 13, 1972 (age 54) Trenton, New Jersey, U.S.
- Party: Democratic
- Spouse: Rohini Dhir
- Education: Johns Hopkins University (BS); Harvard University (MPP)

Aneesh Paul Chopra (born July 13, 1972) is an American executive who served as the first Chief Technology Officer of the United States. He was appointed in 2009 by President Barack Obama and was at the White House through 2012. Chopra previously served as Virginia's Secretary of Technology under Governor Tim Kaine. Chopra was a candidate in 2013 for the Democratic nomination for Lieutenant Governor of Virginia. He is the author of Innovative State: How New Technologies Can Transform Government (2014) and co-founder and president of CareJourney. In 2015 he joined Albright Stonebridge Group as a senior advisor.

== Early life and education ==
Chopra was born in Trenton, New Jersey, the eldest son of Punjabi Indian immigrants Ram and Neelam Chopra, and graduated from West Windsor-Plainsboro High School South in 1990. While attending high school, Chopra was selected to participate in American Legion Jersey Boys State, a government, civics, and citizenship program. Chopra received his undergraduate degree in public health from the Johns Hopkins University and a Master of Public Policy from the John F. Kennedy School of Government at Harvard University. After receiving his M.P.P., Chopra worked for The Advisory Board Company where he was a Managing Director.

== Career ==
=== Virginia Secretary of Technology ===
In 2006, Virginia Governor Tim Kaine appointed Chopra as the commonwealth's Secretary of Technology. His service continued until his appointment as U.S. Chief Technology Officer in 2009. Chopra spearheaded a number of innovations in state government, including the creation of a Productivity Innovation Fund which provided resources for state agencies to pursue IT projects to improve efficiency. In 2008 Chopra implemented a statewide performance management strategy, that Governing magazine described as "venture governmentalism." Later that year, the Pew Charitable Trust and Governing Magazine announced Virginia was tied as the "best managed state" in the country.

=== U.S. Chief Technology Officer ===
Chopra's appointment as the first Chief Technology Officer of the United States was announced by the White House on April 18, 2009. From the official release: "[a]s Chief Technology Officer, Chopra will promote technological innovation to help the country meet its goals from job creation, to reducing health care costs, to protecting the homeland." Chopra was confirmed by the United States Senate on August 7, 2009. The office of Chief Technology Officer was organized within the White House Office of Science and Technology Policy. The C.T.O. also serves as a cabinet-rank member of the National Economic Council and the Domestic Policy Council.

==== President's Strategy for American Innovation ====
In 2011, the White House announced the updated Strategy for American Innovation which was aimed at innovating a number of areas of the federal government. As part of President Obama's goal to "win the future," Chopra implemented a number of new programs focused on education, research, and infrastructure.

==== Startup America ====
Startup America, launched in 2011, is a White House program aimed at spurring innovation through entrepreneurship. Chopra helped drive the Startup America effort worked to improve access to startup capital, reduce barriers to entry, connect entrepreneurs with mentors, and create new market opportunities in health care, clean energy and education. Along with the White House initiatives, the Startup America Partnership was created as an independent alliance of private sector leaders.

==== Open Innovator's Toolkit ====
In 2012, Chopra announced the release of the Open Innovator's Toolkit, a collection of 20 leading practices that 'open innovators' should consider when approaching policy proposals at all levels of government. As noted in the memorandum to the National Science and Technology Council Committee on Technology, the goal was "rather than pursue traditional "top-down" models to spur breakthroughs ... President Obama emphasizes a "bottom-up" philosophy that taps into the expertise of the American people."

==== Blue Button and Green Button ====
Launched by Chopra and the White House in 2010, the "Blue Button" program gave military veterans a tool to download their individual health records from the Veterans' Administration. This tool made it easy for veterans to obtain their medical records and coordinate care with healthcare providers. As of 2015, similar programs were unveiled by the Department of Defense and the Center for Medicare and Medicaid Services. In the first five years of the Blue Button, nearly 3 million veterans, military personnel, and Medicare beneficiaries had obtained their medical records online.

Likewise, the Green Button program was launched in 2012 and provided Americans with easy and secure access to their electricity usage data and was built on the success of the Blue Button program. The program provides energy consumption data in a standardized format that can easily be displayed on the web or via other applications.

== Post-Obama administration career ==
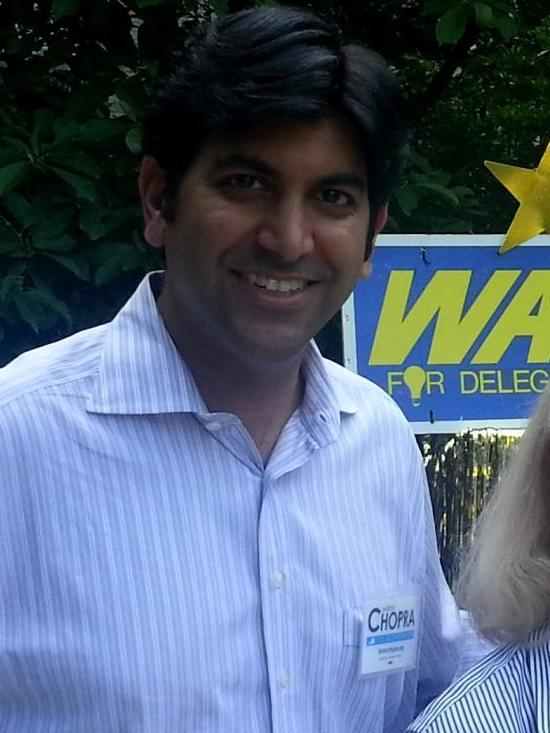
Chopra campaigning for lieutenant governor of Virginia in 2013

In July 2012, The Washington Post reported that Chopra would run for the Democratic nomination for Lieutenant Governor of Virginia in the 2013 election. The primary election was held on June 11, 2013, and Chopra was defeated by State Senator Ralph Northam by a margin of 54-46%.

In 2014, Chopra authored of Innovative State: How New Technologies Can Transform Government. Chopra became the co-founder and president of CareJourney.

In 2014, Chopra was named to the inaugural class of Walter Shorenstein Media and Democracy Fellows at Harvard's Kennedy School of Government. He led a program that addressed the role of data as public infrastructure and the challenges and opportunities involved with expanding open access to data.

Later in 2014, Chopra was appointed by Governor Terry McAuliffe to serve on the Council on Virginia's Future. From the Council's description: "The Council works to help guide Virginia in improving outcomes for citizens. Membership is prescribed by law and includes top leadership from the executive and legislative branches of state government, as well as business and community leaders from across the Commonwealth."

Chopra was a keynote speaker at the 2016 Congress of Future Science and Technology Leaders.

In November 2020, Chopra was named a member of the Joe Biden presidential transition Agency Review Team to support transition efforts related to the United States Postal Service.

== See also ==
- Todd Park
- Vivek Kundra

Political offices
Preceded by Eugene Huang	Virginia Secretary of Technology; 2006–2009	Succeeded by Leonard Pomata
New title	Chief Technology Officer of the United States; 2009–2012	Succeeded by Todd Park
