= Health Datapalooza =

Annual public health conference

The Health Datapalooza is an annual conference which exists to promote access to open data in the United States for the purpose of improving public health. Since its inception in 2010, Health Datapalooza has become the gathering place for people and organizations creating knowledge from data and pioneering innovations that drive health policy and practice.

== History ==
The first Health Datapalooza was a meeting organized in 2010 as the Health Data Initiative Forum in response to the newly established website and database HealthData.gov. The Obama administration invited 45 people to gather to consider 30 data sets and develop some prototype application using them within 30 days.

Datapalooza 2012

At Health Datapalooza 2012, the first time that name was used, a call was made for innovators to use data related to health and nutrition.

Datapalooza 2013

In giving the keynote address at the fourth Datapalooza, Jonathan S. Bush of athenahealth said "Data scientist may be the sexiest career in the 21st-century!" 1900 attendees and 80 companies joined the event.

Datapalooza 2014

A topic of discussion was the Republican Party's criticism of the Office of the National Coordinator for Health Information Technology's authority to create a health IT safety center.

Datapalooza 2016

Current Vice President of the United States, Joe Biden gave a keynote address and discussed his family's struggles with cancer.
