= Chief Technology Officer of the Department of Health and Human Services =

Top IT development official in the US Department of Health and Human Services

The chief technology officer of the Department of Health and Human Services is the top information technology development official in the United States Department of Health and Human Services.

== History ==
The position was established in 2009. In July 2024, it moved from the Office of the Assistant Secretary for Administration into the Office of the National Coordinator for Health Information Technology.

== List of officeholders ==
Name	President	Term	Refs
Todd Park	Barack Obama	2009–2012	
Bryan Sivak	Barack Obama	July 2012 – April 2015	
Susannah Fox	Barack Obama	May 2015 – January 2017	
Bruce D. Greenstein	Donald Trump	May 2017 – June 2018	
Edwin Simcox, Jr.	Donald Trump	July 2018 – February 2020	
vacant	Donald Trump	February 2020 – January 2025	
vacant	Joe Biden	February 2020 – January 2025	
Alicia Rouault	Joe Biden	January – February 2025	
Alicia Rouault	Donald Trump	January – February 2025	
Clark Minor	Donald Trump	February 2025 – August 2025	
Zachary Terrell	Donald Trump	October 2025 – present	

== See also ==
- Chief Technology Officer of the United States
