= Todd Park =

American entrepreneur and government official

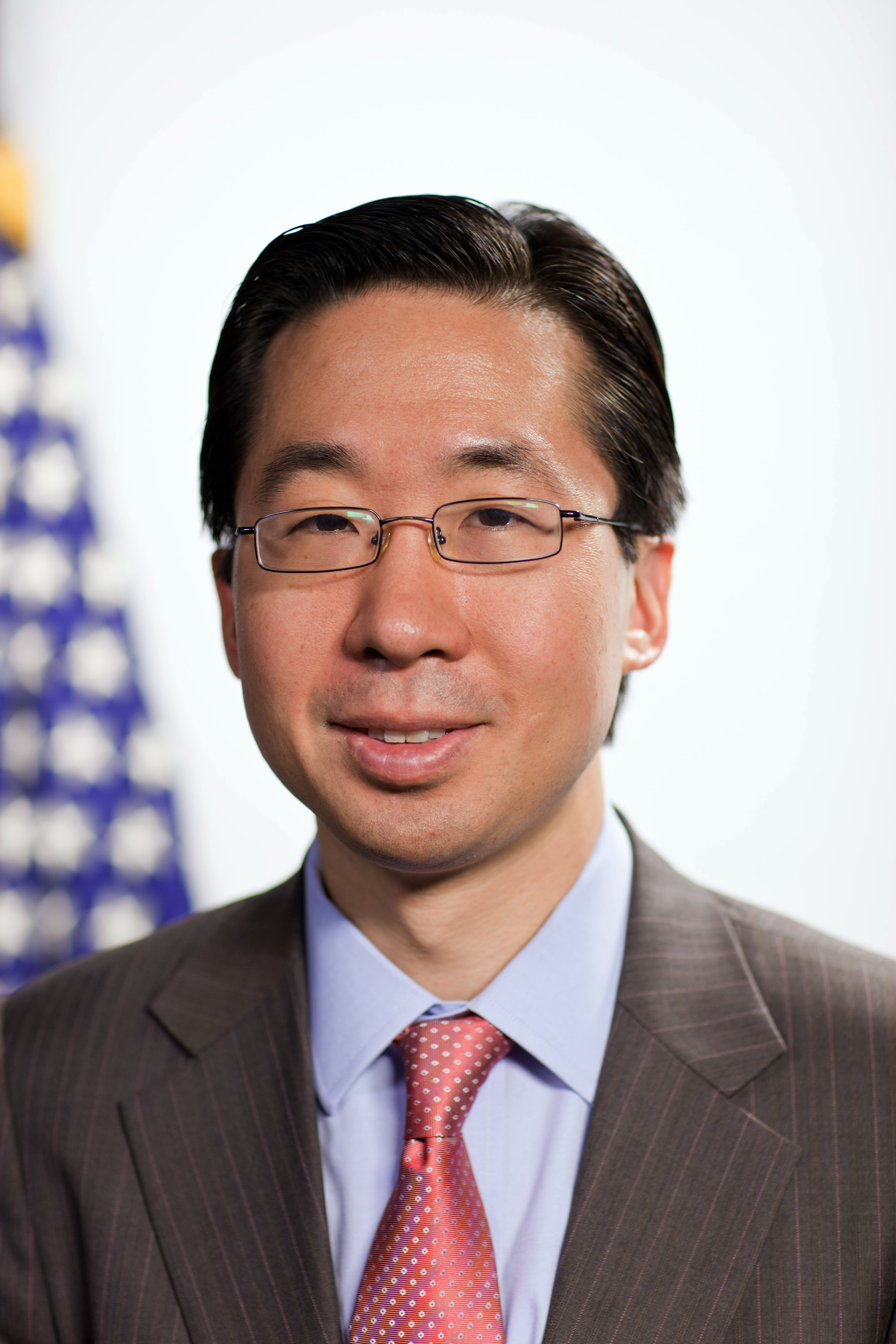
- Official portrait, 2012

2nd Chief Technology Officer of the United States
- In office March 1, 2012 – August 28, 2014
- President: Barack Obama
- Preceded by: Aneesh Chopra
- Succeeded by: Megan Smith

Personal details
- Born: 1973 (age 52–53) Salt Lake City, Utah, U.S.
- Party: Democratic
- Spouse: Amy
- Children: 2
- Education: Harvard University (BA)

Todd Park is an American entrepreneur and government official. He served as Chief Technology Officer of the United States and technology advisor for U.S. President Barack Obama. He is the co-founder and executive chairman of Devoted Health.

== Early life and education ==
Park was born in 1973 in Salt Lake City, Utah to South Korean immigrant parents. He graduated from the Columbus Academy in 1990. In that year he was named a Presidential Scholar. He attended Harvard as an economics major where he met his future wife, Amy, with whom he has two children. He graduated magna cum laude and a Phi Beta Kappa.

== Companies ==
Park co-founded athenahealth with Jonathan S. Bush in 1997 at the age of 24. In 2008 he co-founded Castlight Health, named by The Wall Street Journal as the #1 venture-backed company in America for 2011.

Park also served as a volunteer senior advisor to Ashoka, a global incubator of social entrepreneurs, where he helped start a venture called Healthpoint Services, which brings affordable clean water, drugs, diagnostics, and telehealth services to rural villages in India. In 2011, Healthpoint Services won the Sankalp Award for the "most innovative and promising health-oriented social enterprise in India.

In 2017, Park founded Devoted Health, where he serves as co-founder and executive chairman.

== Department of Health and Human Services ==
In 2009, he was approached by Bill Corr to be the Chief Technology Officer of the Department of Health and Human Services. At HHS, he was a leader in bringing the notion of "big data" to healthcare. He expressed his ambition to create an open health data platform analogous to the National Weather Service, which feeds data to commercial weather sites and applications. He also described his desire to create a "holy cow machine for healthcare" that shows waste.

He was an advocate for applying open innovation and the Lean Startup approach to government initiatives. Under Park, HHS applied open innovation—sometimes called crowdsourcing—to leverage the distributed intelligence of people outside of government. According to The New York Times, Park believes that releasing health data through HealthData.gov will support the agency's public health goals and catalyze new business opportunities in mhealth and eHealth. In 2010, Fast Company magazine named him one of the 100 Most Innovative People in Business.

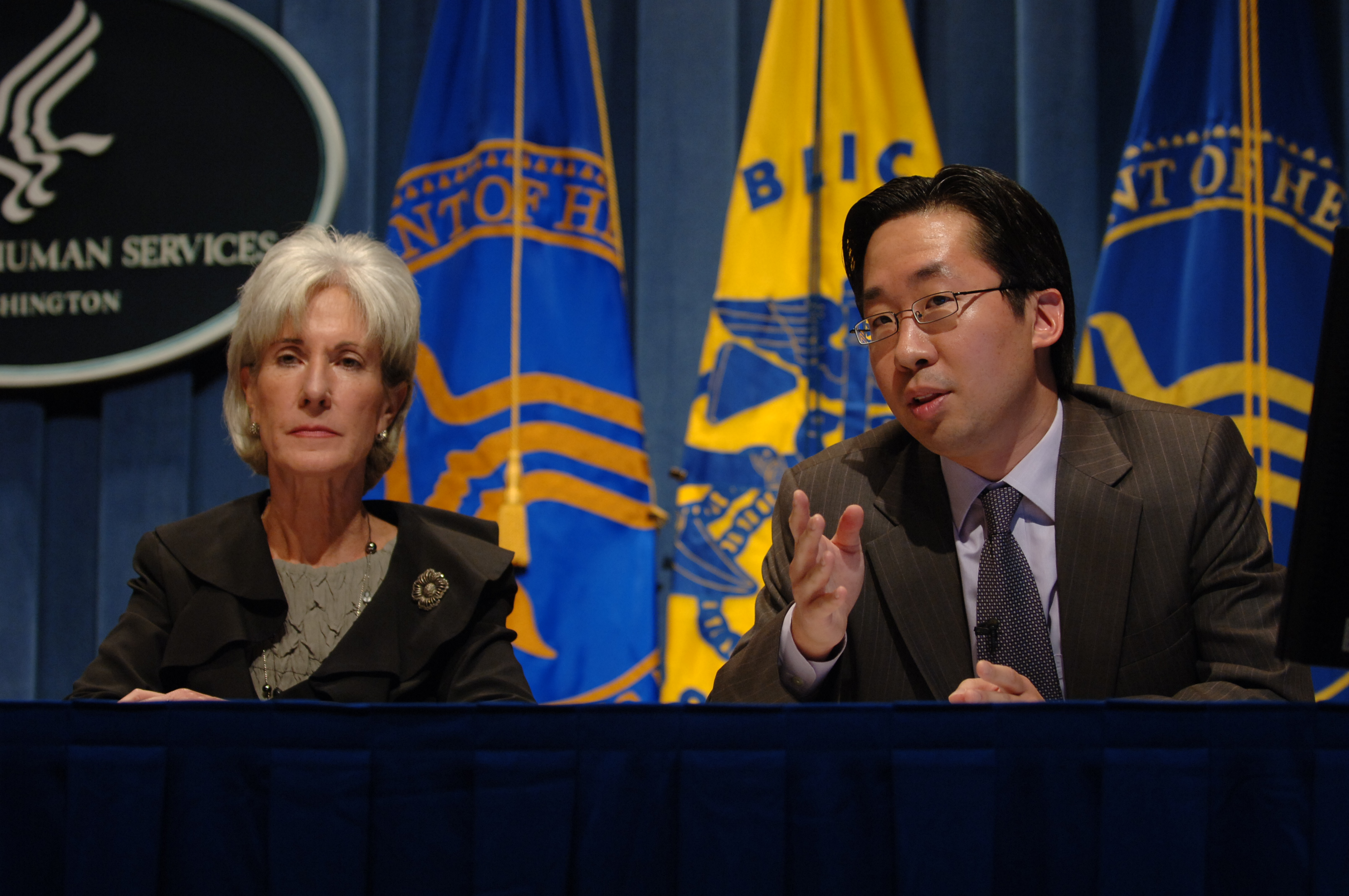
Park and Kathleen Sebelius

Park ran his team inside of the massive government agency "like a Silicon Valley company," according to the Atlantic. That approach was particularly relevant in the development of HealthCare.gov, the first government website that provides consumers with a searchable database of public and private health insurance plans available across the U.S. by zip code.

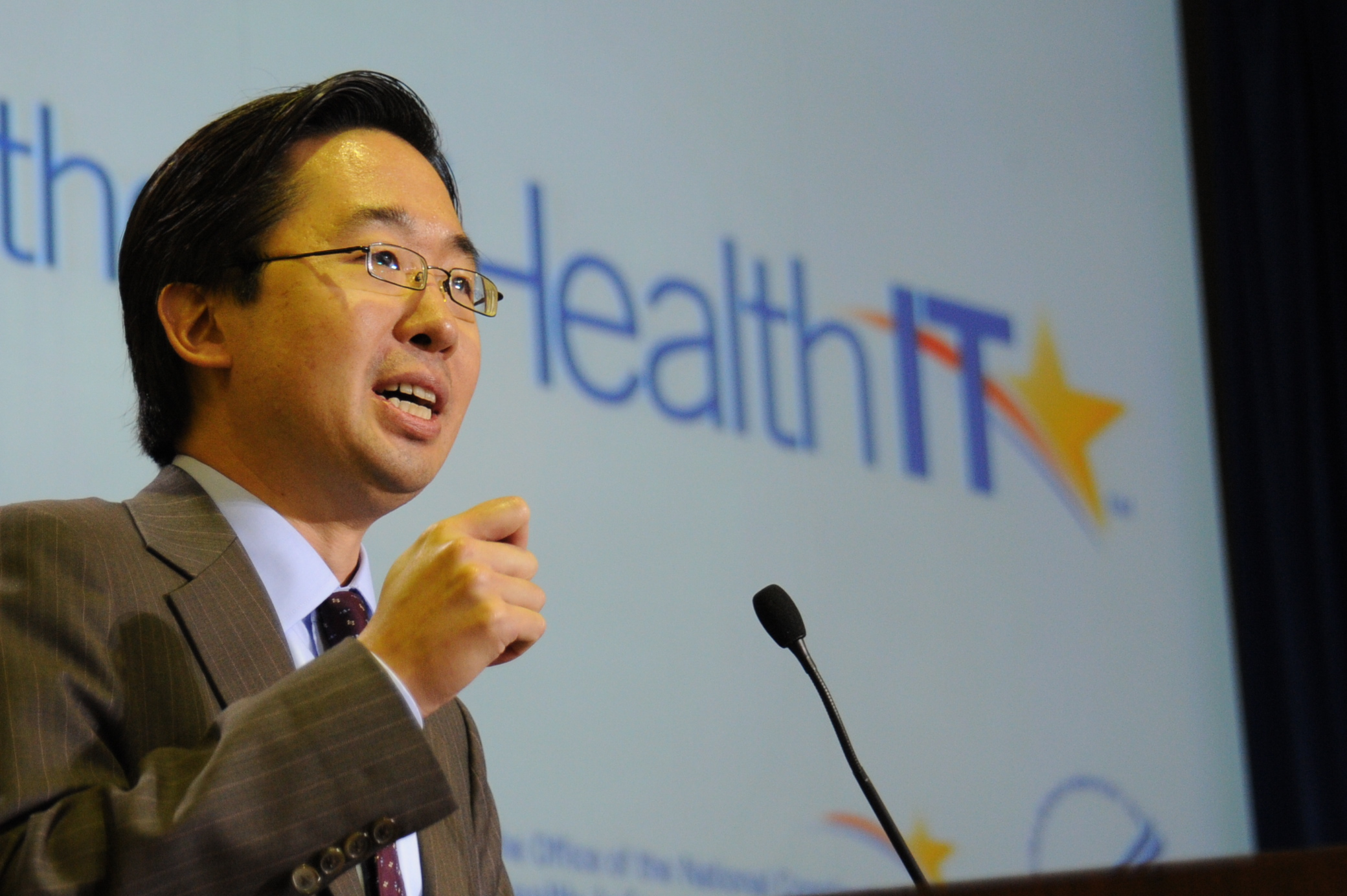
Park speaks at Consumer E-Health Summit.

At HHS, Park also launched the Community Health Data Initiative, a developer conference and showcase to encourage the development of innovative healthcare applications using open government data. By its fourth year, the event, renamed the Health Datapalooza, grew to over 2000 attendees, receives coverage from technology blogs, and has participation from venture capitalists, physicians and politicians from both sides of the aisle, providing an example of a way that government can engage with the private sector.

== US Chief Technology Officer ==
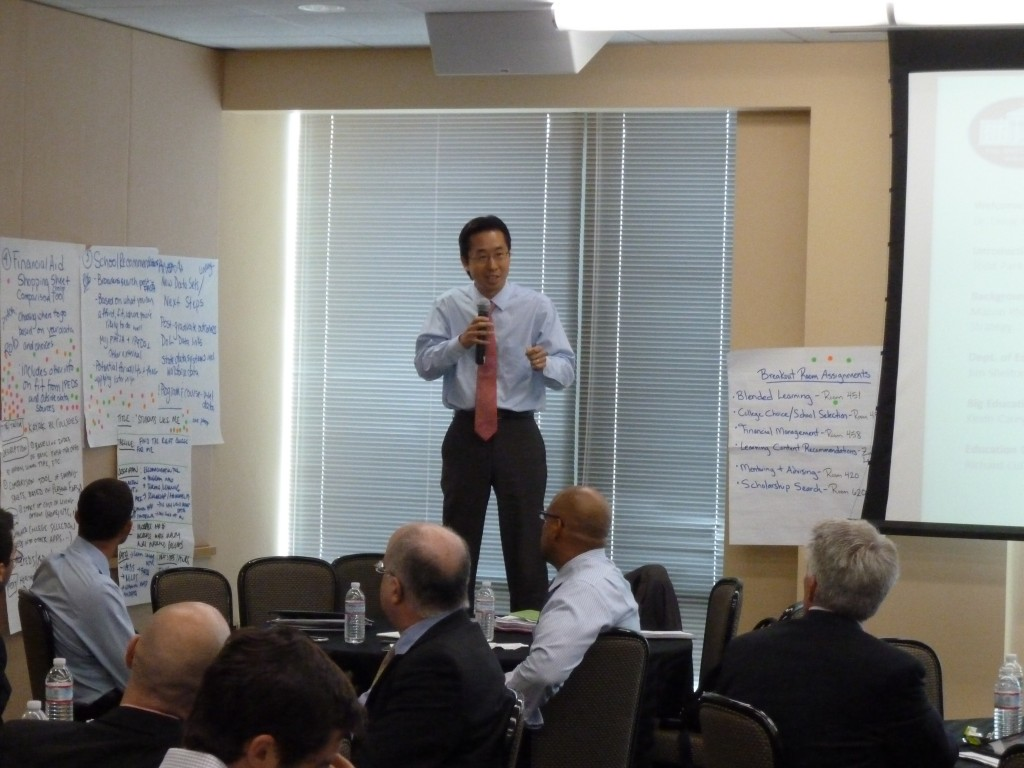
Todd Park leading Education Data Jam

In March 2012, President Obama appointed Todd Park to replace Aneesh Chopra as the United States Chief Technology Officer and Assistant to the President. After assuming this role, Park worked with a variety of agencies across the federal government to replicate the Datapalooza in their respective domains.

Inspired by Code for America, Park also started the Presidential Innovation Fellows program, designed to bring top innovators from outside government for focused "tours of duty" with federal innovators on game-changing projects. The idea of the program is to combine the experience of citizen change agents and government change agents to tackle specific challenges at high speed, delivering significant results within six months.

== Involvement with Healthcare.gov ==
The initial version of HealthCare.gov, which was deployed on July 1, 2010, was built in 90 days by Park and his team at HHS. The first HealthCare.gov was cited by the Kaiser Family Foundation as one of the early highlights in the implementation of the healthcare reform implementation progress. HealthCare.gov was also the first website ever "demoed" by a sitting president

The following two versions, from the relaunch of the front end in May 2013 to the badly flawed marketplace that went live in October 2013, were developed by contractors and overseen by officials at the Centers for Medicare and Medicaid Services, outside of his purview within the White House Office of Science and Technology Policy. When the extent of the problems with Healthcare.gov became clear, Park was tasked by President Obama to work on a "trauma team" that addressed the "technological disaster". Park, along with Jeffrey Zients, led the "tech surge" that ultimately repaired Healthcare.gov over the winter, eventually fixing the marketplace sufficiently to enable millions of Americans to find plans and purchase health insurance.
