= Steve Martin (Virginia politician) =

American politician (born 1956)

Member of the Virginia Senate from the 11th district
- In office February 17, 1994 – January 13, 2016
- Preceded by: Robert E. Russell
- Succeeded by: Amanda Chase

Member of the Virginia House of Delegates from the 27th district
- In office January 8, 1992 – February 17, 1994
- Preceded by: Phoebe Orebaugh
- Succeeded by: Samuel A. Nixon

Member of the Virginia House of Delegates from the 67th district
- In office January 13, 1988 – January 8, 1992
- Preceded by: Leslie Saunders
- Succeeded by: Roger McClure

Personal details
- Born: Stephen Holliday Martin; June 15, 1956 (age 70) Chesterfield, Virginia, U.S.
- Party: Republican
- Education: Lynchburg Christian Academy
- Occupation: Insurance

Stephen Holliday Martin (born June 15, 1956) is an American politician of the Republican Party. He was a member of the Virginia House of Delegates from 1988 to 1994 and the Senate of Virginia from 1994 to 2016.

== Electoral history ==
In 1987, Martin defeated incumbent Democrat Leslie Saunders for the 67th District House of Delegates seat, 51%-49%. In 1989, Saunders challenged Martin for the seat, but Martin won 55%-45%. Due to redistricting, Martin was redrawn into the 27th District in 1991, and won the House of Delegates seat unopposed, and was re-elected in 1993. In February 1994, Martin won a special election to the state Senate in the 11th District after Robert Russell resigned after being convicted of embezzlement. He received 75% of the vote in a four-way race. Martin was easily re-elected to the seat in 1995 (he was unopposed), 1999 (won 65%-35%), 2003 (unopposed), 2007 (received 63% of the vote in a four-way race), and 2011 (unopposed).

In 2000, Martin ran Virginia's 7th congressional district. However, he lost the Republican primary to Eric Cantor by only a razor-thin margin of 263 votes out of over 40,000 cast.

Senator Martin announced his intention to seek the Republican nomination for Lieutenant Governor of Virginia in 2013 in June 2012. He was defeated at the 2013 state convention.

On June 9, 2015, in the Republican Primary for the District 11 State Senate Seat, Martin lost to Amanda Chase in a three-way race, with Barry Moore coming in last.

== Election results ==
Virginia Senate 11th District General Election, 2011
Party	Candidate	Votes	%
Republican	Steve Martin	25,269	94.70
Independent	Write-in candidates	1,414	5.30
Total votes		255,826	100

Virginia Senate 11th District General Election, 2007
Party	Candidate	Votes	%
Republican	Steve Martin	16,481	62.75
Democratic	Alexander McMurtrie	4,764	18.14
Independent	Hank Cook	3,878	14.77
Independent	Roger Habeck	1,135	4.32
Independent	Write-in candidates	6	0.02
Total votes		26,264	100

Virginia Senate 11th District General Election, 2003
Party	Candidate	Votes	%
Republican	Steve Martin	18,702	97.27
Independent	Write-in candidates	524	2.73
Total votes		19,226	100

Virginia Senate 11th District General Election, 1999
Party	Candidate	Votes	%
Republican	Steve Martin	17,716	64.54
Democratic	William Hastings	9,689	35.30
Independent	Write-in candidates	45	0.16
Total votes		27,450	100

Virginia Senate 11th District General Election, 1995
Party	Candidate	Votes	%
Republican	Steve Martin	28,693	99.41
Independent	Write-in candidates	170	0.59
Total votes		28,863	100

Virginia Senate 11th District Special Election, 1994
Party	Candidate	Votes	%
Republican	Steve Martin	14,305	74.76
Democratic	Alexander McMurtrie	4,219	22.05
Independent	Thomas Jamerson	452	2.36
Independent	Bradley Evans	148	0.77
Independent	Write-in candidates	10	0.06
Total votes		19,134	100

Virginia House of Delegates 27th District Election, 1993
Party	Candidate	Votes	%
Republican	Steve Martin	14,243	79.53
Independent	Bradley Evans	3,655	20.41
Independent	Write-in candidates	11	0.06
Total votes		17,909	100

Virginia House of Delegates 27th District Election, 1991
Party	Candidate	Votes	%
Republican	Steve Martin	8,465	99.28
Independent	Write-in candidates	61	0.72
Total votes		8,526	100

Virginia House of Delegates 67th District Election, 1989
Party	Candidate	Votes	%
Republican	Steve Martin	11,178	55.27
Democratic	Leslie Saunders	9,034	44.67
Independent	Write-in candidates	12	0.06
Total votes		20,224	100

Virginia House of Delegates 67th District Election, 1987
Party	Candidate	Votes	%
Republican	Steve Martin	8,271	51.14
Democratic	Leslie Saunders	6,872	48.82
Independent	Write-in candidates	7	0.04
Total votes		15,150	100

== Memberships ==
Senator Martin serves as one of two Virginia state chairmen for the American Legislative Exchange Council (ALEC).

== Facebook comments on abortion ==
Martin made news in 2014 when he wrote a lengthy post on Facebook claiming that pregnant women are "hosts" who have no right to end their pregnancies via abortion. "Martin said that his words were taken out of context and that he was trying to describe the way abortion advocates see women." He later edited the post to replace "host" with "bearer of the child."
