= Samuel A. Nixon =

American politician (born 1958)

Chief Information Officer of Virginia
- In office April 5, 2010 – March 16, 2015
- Governor: Bob McDonnell; Terry McAuliffe
- Preceded by: George F. Coulter
- Succeeded by: Nelson Moe

Member of the Virginia House of Delegates from the 27th district
- In office March 10, 1994 – April 4, 2010
- Preceded by: Steve Martin
- Succeeded by: Roxann Robinson

Personal details
- Born: November 9, 1958 (age 67) Martinsville, Virginia
- Party: Republican
- Spouse: Carol A. Gibbs
- Children: Johnathan
- Education: James Madison University
- Occupation: Information technology

Samuel Anthony "Sam" Nixon, Jr. (born November 9, 1958) is an American politician. He served in the Virginia House of Delegates from March 1994 to April 2010, representing the 27th district in Chesterfield County, the southern suburbs of Richmond. From 2010 until 2015, he was the Chief Information Officer of the state, and head of the Virginia Information Technologies Agency (VITA).

In March 2015, Nixon assumed the position of Chief Administrative Officer of the Virginia State Corporation Commission having been nominated by the commissioners of that agency.

== Electoral history ==
Date	Election	Candidate	Party	Votes	%
Virginia House of Delegates, 27th district
March 8, 1994	Special	Samuel Anthony Nixon, Jr.	Republican	2,655	80.99
March 8, 1994	Special	Marjorie M. Clark	Democratic	566	17.27
March 8, 1994	Special	Bradley E. Evans		51	1.56
March 8, 1994	Special	Write Ins		6	0.18
March 8, 1994	Special	Steve Martin was elected to the Senate; seat stayed Republican			
November 7, 1995	General	S A Nixon	Republican	7,468	69.59
November 7, 1995	General	B E Evans		3,251	30.30
November 7, 1995	General	Write Ins		12	0.11
November 4, 1997	General	Samuel A. "Sam" Nixon, Jr.	Republican	14,237	98.39
November 4, 1997	General	Write Ins		233	1.61
November 2, 1999	General	S A Nixon Jr	Republican	5,633	69.30
November 2, 1999	General	B E Evans		2,466	30.34
November 2, 1999	General	Write Ins		30	0.37
November 6, 2001	General	S A Nixon Jr	Republican	16,012	98.18
November 6, 2001	General	Write Ins		296	1.82
November 4, 2003	General	S A Nixon Jr	Republican	5,598	96.72
November 4, 2003	General	Write Ins		190	3.28
November 8, 2005	General	S A Nixon Jr	Republican	15,611	95.54
November 8, 2005	General	Write Ins		729	4.46
November 6, 2007	General	Samuel A. "Sam" Nixon, Jr.	Republican	7,631	96.33
November 6, 2007	General	Write Ins		290	3.66
November 3, 2009	General	Samuel A. "Sam" Nixon, Jr.	Republican	15,938	95.19
November 3, 2009	General	Write Ins		805	4.80
