= Susannah Fox =

Health researcher and entrepreneur

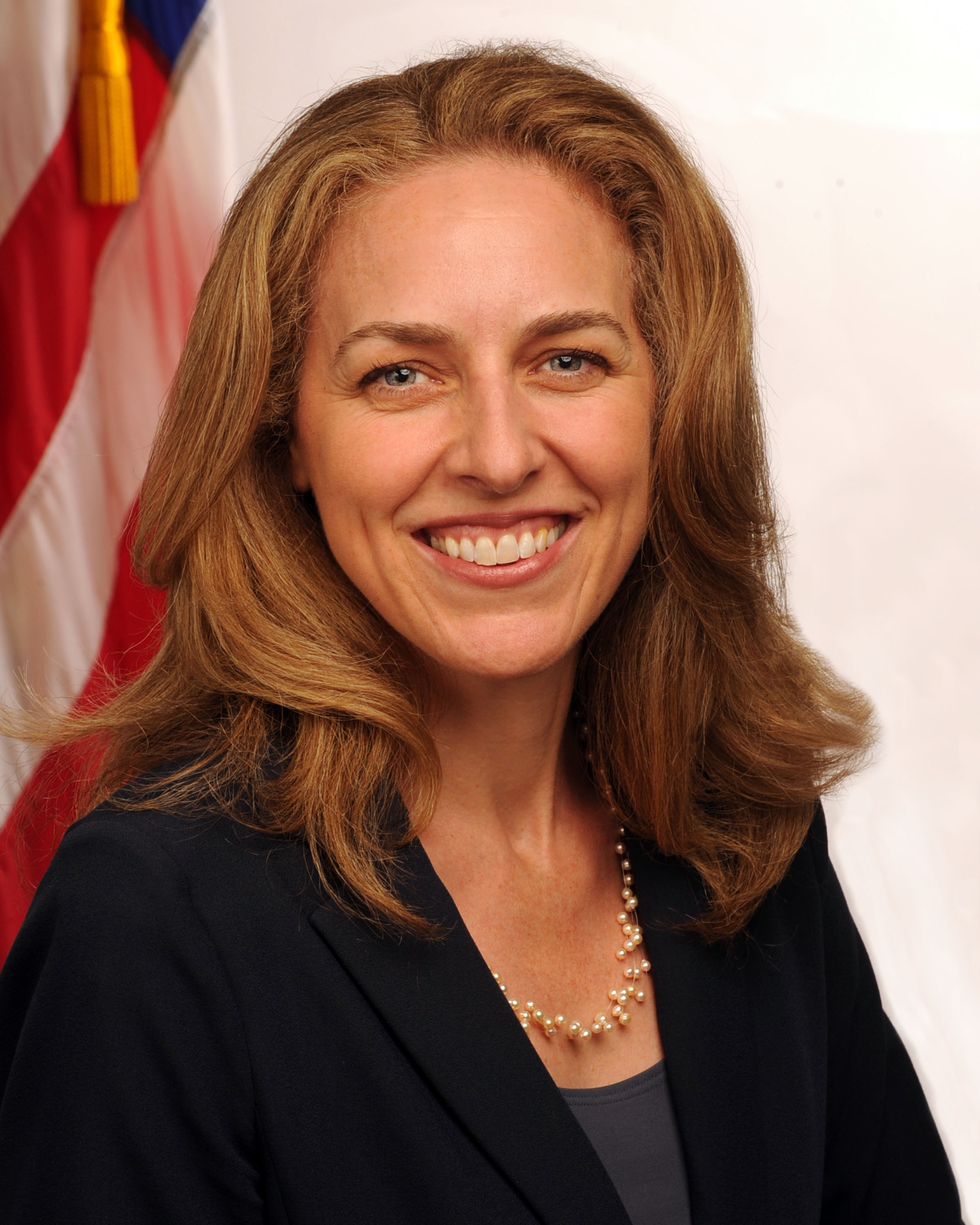

3rd Chief Technology Officer of the Department of Health and Human Services
- In office May 2015 – January 2017
- President: Barack Obama
- Preceded by: Bryan Sivak

Personal details
- Education: Wesleyan University
- Website: http://susannahfox.com/

Susannah Rogers Fox is an American healthcare and information technology researcher who was the Chief Technology Officer of the U.S. Department of Health and Human Services from May 2015 to January 2017. Prior to this, she spent 14 years at the Pew Research Center studying the impact of Internet technology on healthcare, and was involved in the initial launching of U.S. News & World Report's website in 1995.

== Education and early career ==
Fox graduated Wesleyan University with a B.A. in anthropology in 1992. After graduating she worked for The Harwood Institute in Bethesda, Maryland, and then RealNetworks. In 1995 she joined U.S. News & World Report, helping to launch their website that year, and becoming its lead editor in 1999.

Beginning in 2000, Fox spent 14 years at the Pew Research Center, directing their research on consumer-focused health and technology. Fox examined the social impact of technology on healthcare, including patients and caregivers who were crowdsourcing diagnoses and creating their own medical devices to solve their unique problems. This led her to later cite the maker movement as a promising source of healthcare innovation, and to support lowering entry barriers for innovators from nontraditional backgrounds, using methods such as altering existing medical devices or using 3D printing to engineer new devices.

After her time at Pew, Fox spent a year as an Entrepreneur-in-Residence at the Robert Wood Johnson Foundation.

== Department of Health and Human Services ==
Fox was Chief Technology Officer of the Department of Health and Human Services during the last portion of the Obama administration, from May 2015 to January 2017. The position was initiated during the Obama administration, and was intended to act as an ambassador to the entrepreneurial and technology community in Silicon Valley and coordinating with the White House Office of Science and Technology Policy, rather than being focused on the agency's day-to-day technology needs. Fox was not an engineer by trade, but drew on her anthropology background to connect healthcare professionals with structural solutions, calling herself an "Internet geologist".

== Personal life ==
Fox's father was an account executive for IBM, and her mother was an editor at the Philadelphia newspaper U.S. 1. Fox married Eric Ian Halperin, a trial lawyer, in 1998.
