= Atoosa Reaser =

American politician from Virginia

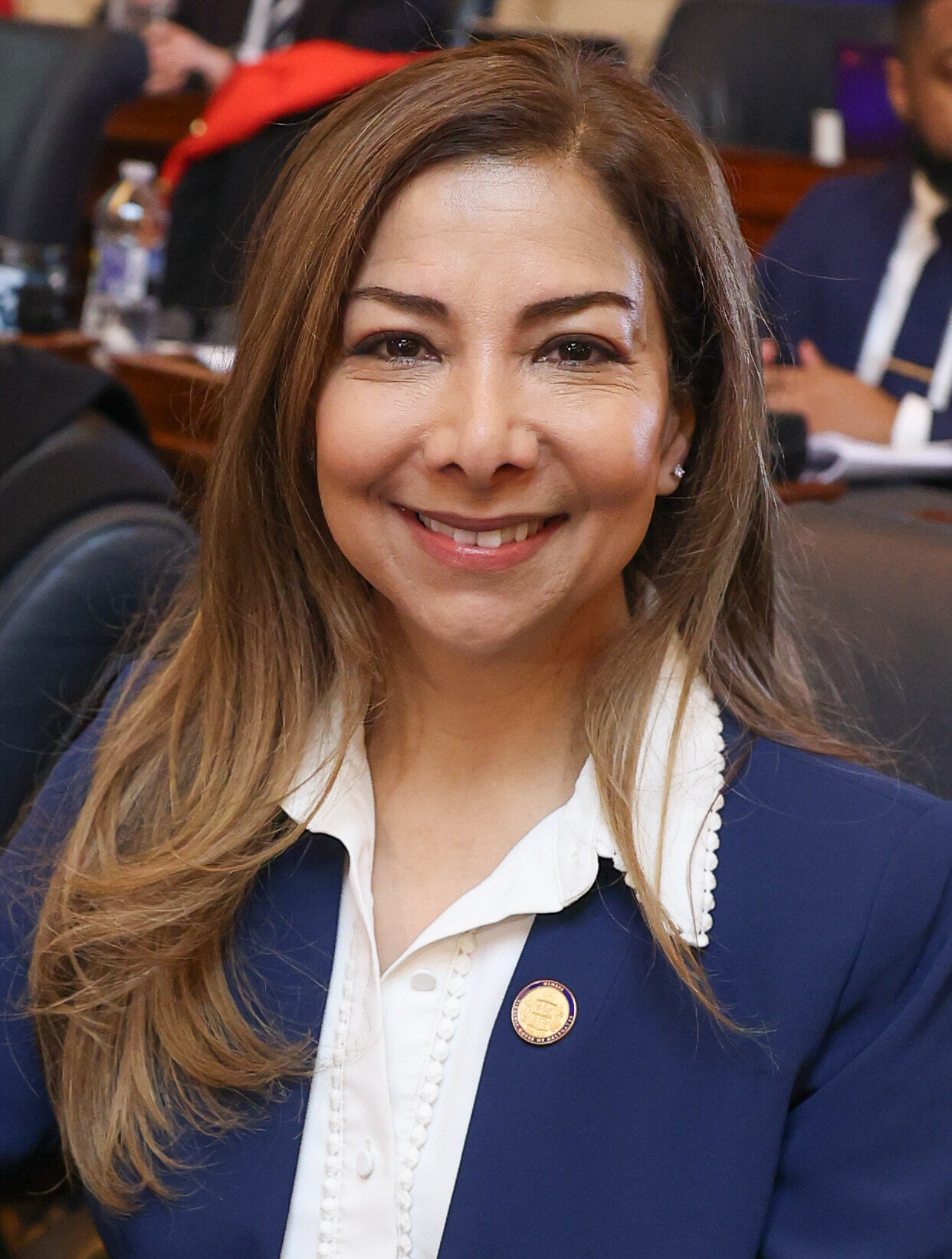

Member of the Virginia House of Delegates from the 27th District
- Incumbent
- Assumed office January 10, 2024
- Preceded by: Roxann Robinson (redistricting)

Member of the Loudoun County School Board from the Algonkian District
- In office January 1, 2020 – December 31, 2023
- Preceded by: Debbie Rose
- Succeeded by: April Chandler

Personal details
- Born: Tehran, Iran
- Party: Democratic
- Education: James Madison University (BA); George Mason University (JD)
- Occupation: Lawyer; politician
- Website: www.atoosareaser.com

Atoosa Reza Reaser is an American lawyer and Democratic Party politician from Virginia. She was elected to the Virginia House of Delegates in the 2023 Virginia House of Delegates election to represent the 27th district. Prior to her service in the General Assembly, Reaser served a four-year term on the Loudoun County School Board, during which was elected twice by her peers to serve as Vice Chair. Reaser is the first Iranian-American elected to the Virginia General Assembly.
