= Open data in the United States =

Open data in the United States refers to the Federal government of the United States' perspectives, policies, and practices regarding open data.

== History ==
In the 1970s the National Oceanic and Atmospheric Administration began releasing weather information, which could now be called "open data".

After Korean Air Lines Flight 007, a Boeing 747 carrying 269 people, was shot down in 1983 after straying into the USSR's prohibited airspace, in the vicinity of Sakhalin and Moneron Islands, President Ronald Reagan issued a directive making the United States Global Positioning System of Air Force Space Command, freely available for civilian use, once it was sufficiently developed, as a common good. During the presidency of Bill Clinton the data actually was made available for public use.

== Value of US government open data ==
Industry collects, processes, and resells open data from the United States government. United States government weather data is the base of an industry which generates US$30 billion annually. GPS data is the base of an industry estimated to generate US$90 billion annually. Vivek Kundra noted that "Zillow is valued at over $1 billion, the Weather Channel was sold for approximately $3.5 billion in 2008, and Garmin has a market cap of $7.24 billion. These are all companies that were built using raw government data."

== Open Data Policy ==
the May 2013 memorandum which noted the development of open data infrastructure

In May 2013 Barack Obama issued an executive order which established the Open Data Policy along with a memorandum from the Office of Management and Budget which supported that policy. These policies were developed as a way to promote economic growth and create jobs. They were guided by precedents and policies of the Sunlight Foundation and Open Knowledge. The Sunlight Foundation said at the establishment of the policy that it "certainly appears to be the strongest index and audit requirement" that the organization had seen.

The government published this policy on GitHub.

== data.gov ==
data.gov is a U.S. government website launched in late May 2009 by the then Federal Chief Information Officer (CIO) of the United States, Vivek Kundra.

According to its website, "The purpose of data.gov is to increase public access to high value, machine readable datasets generated by the Executive Branch of the Federal Government." The site seeks to become "a repository for all the information the government collects". The site would publish to the public any data that is not private or restricted for national security reasons.

== See also ==
- Copyright status of works by the federal government of the United States
- Copyright status of works by subnational governments of the United States
- Public.Resource.Org
- Freedom of Information Act
- Open data in the United Kingdom
- Public domain

== Sources ==
- Gurin, Joel (2014). Open data now : the secret to hot startups, smart investing, savvy marketing, and fast innovation. New York: McGraw Hill Education. ISBN 978-0-07-182977-9.
