= Athenahealth =

American healthcare company

athenahealth, Inc.
- Type: Private
- Traded as: Nasdaq: ATHN
- Industry: Healthcare Technology
- Founded: 1997; 29 years ago (as Athena Women's Health)
- Founders: Jonathan Bush; Todd Park
- Headquarters: Boston, Massachusetts, U.S.
- Key people: Bob Segert (chairman & CEO)
- Products: athenaCollector (revenue cycle management, medical billing), athenaClinicals (electronic health records), athenaCommunicator (patient engagement, care coordination), Epocrates, and athenahealth Population Health (population health management)
- Owners: Bain Capital; Hellman & Friedman
- Number of employees: 6,000+ (February 2019)
- Website: athenahealth.com

Athenahealth, Inc. is a privately held American company that provides cloud-based SaaS healthcare technology and network-enabled services and point-of-care mobile apps for healthcare in the United States. Its primary product is athenaOne, an all-in-one software platform that combines electronic health record (EHR), practice management, medical billing, claims denials, prior authorization and revenue cycle management, as well as patient engagement tools for ambulatory practices.

The company was founded in 1997 in San Diego and is now headquartered in Boston, Massachusetts. They have operational sites in Belfast, Maine; Atlanta, Georgia; Austin, Texas; and Burlington, Vermont, with international operations in Chennai, Bangalore, and Pune, India.

On February 15, 2022, the company was acquired by Bain Capital and Hellman & Friedman for $17 billion.

== Company history ==
=== Athena Women's Health ===
The company was founded by Jonathan Bush and Todd Park in 1997 as Athena Women's Health, a women's health and birthing center in San Diego, California.

Bush and Park initially planned to develop a nationwide network of maternity clinics.

At the birthing center, only 10% of babies were delivered by C-section, one-third of the national average, and 90% of mothers could breastfeed their newborns, beating the national average of 67%.

=== Athenahealth ===
In 1998, venture funder Mark Wilson offered to buy Athenahealth's software for $11 million. Bush and Park turned down the offer and transitioned the business model from birthing centers to internet-based healthcare. They rebranded Athena Women's Health to Athenahealth, Inc., pulling in Ed Park, Todd Park's younger brother, an engineer, to develop a practice management system.

In 2000, the company's first client, Anchor Medical Associates, went live on athenaCollector, and, in February, its first electronic claim was submitted. While its first office opened its doors in Waltham, Massachusetts in 2002, Athenahealth moved to Watertown, Massachusetts in 2005, and then the Brighton neighborhood of Boston in 2023.

Athenahealth announced an initial public offering of its common stock on June 22, 2007. The offering was completed on September 20, 2007, at a price of $18 per share. It traded on the NASDAQ exchange under the symbol ATHN until it was taken private in 2019.

Since moving its headquarters to Watertown in 2005, Athenahealth has created campuses in Chennai, India, in 2005; Belfast, Maine, in 2008; Princeton, New Jersey, in 2013; Atlanta, Georgia, and San Francisco, California, in 2014; Austin, Texas, in 2015; and Bangalore and Pune, India, in 2017.

In January 2015, Athenahealth announced the acquisition of RazorInsights, a "leader in cloud-based EHR and financial solutions" for rural, critical access, and community hospitals. The purchase extended Athenahealth's established position in the outpatient market into the 50-bed and under inpatient care environment, which makes up nearly one third of the hospital market.

In February 2015, Athenahealth announced that it had purchased webOMR, a web-based clinical applications and EHR platform developed by Boston's Beth Israel Deaconess Medical Center. Athenahealth collaborated with BIDMC on the development of Athenahealth's acute care service offering, using Beth Israel Deaconess Hospital-Needham, a 58-bed community hospital, as the alpha development site.

On February 7, 2018, former CEO of General Electric, Jeffrey Immelt became the chairman of the board. On June 6, 2018, Immelt was named executive chairman.

Athenahealth announced its acquisition of Praxify Technologies in June 2017.

From 2017 to 2018, under pressure from investor Elliott Management, Athenahealth undertook substantial cost-cutting measures, and Bush resigned.

In November 2018, Athenahealth was bought by Elliott and Veritas Capital for $5.7 billion, and then merged with an organisation that Veritas Capital had acquired from GE Healthcare in April 2018.

In late 2018, Athenahealth's private equity firm announced it was combining Virence Health into Athenahealth. Virence was the former Clinical Business Solutions division of GE Healthcare which combined some assets from the former IDX Systems with its prior acquisitions of MedicaLogic and Millbrook.

On January 28, 2021, the United States Department of Justice reported that Athenahealth violated the False Claims Act (FCA) by paying illegal kickbacks to generate sales of its EHR product, athenaClinicals.

On February 15, 2022, the company was acquired by Bain Capital and Hellman & Friedman for $17 billion.

==== Illegal kickback allegations ====
On January 28, 2021, the United States Department of Justice reported that Athenahealth has agreed to pay $18.25 million to resolve allegations that it violated the False Claims Act (FCA) by paying illegal kickbacks to generate sales of its EHR product, athenaClinicals.

== Products and services ==
=== athenaOne ===
athenaOne is company's fully integrated suite of cloud-based healthcare technology software and services, combining practice management (athenaCollector), an electronic health record (EHR) system (athenaClinicals), and care coordination (athenaCommunicator) into a single packaged offering.

==== athenaCollector ====
Athenahealth's first product, athenaCollector, a cloud-based revenue cycle and practice management service, was launched in 2000. Built by Ed Park, the revenue cycle management system formed the foundation of athenaNet, Athenahealth's web-based system at large. (Ed Park would go on to become Athenahealth's Chief Operating Officer and member of its board.)

==== athenaClinicals ====
In 2006, the company launched athenaClinicals, reported as the "first economically sustainable, service-based" electronic medical records (EMR) system. athenaClinicals has been ranked as leading the market in EHR usability, due to its productivity and ability to reduce providers’ work, effectiveness of delivering patient care, and intuitive user interface.

==== athenaCommunicator ====
In 2008, Athenahealth introduced athenaCommunicator to manage phone calls.

=== Epocrates ===
In 2013, the company purchased the Epocrates mobile brand and continued to occupy Epocrates offices in Princeton, New Jersey, and San Francisco, California. Epocrates aggregates treatment information, including dosing and contraindications, to provide clinical decision support in the prescribing moments of care.

Epocrates drug monographs have also been embedded into the athenaClinicals EHR system to enhance productivity and reduce time not spent on patients.
