= Virginia's 11th Senate district =

American legislative district

Virginia's 11th State Senate district
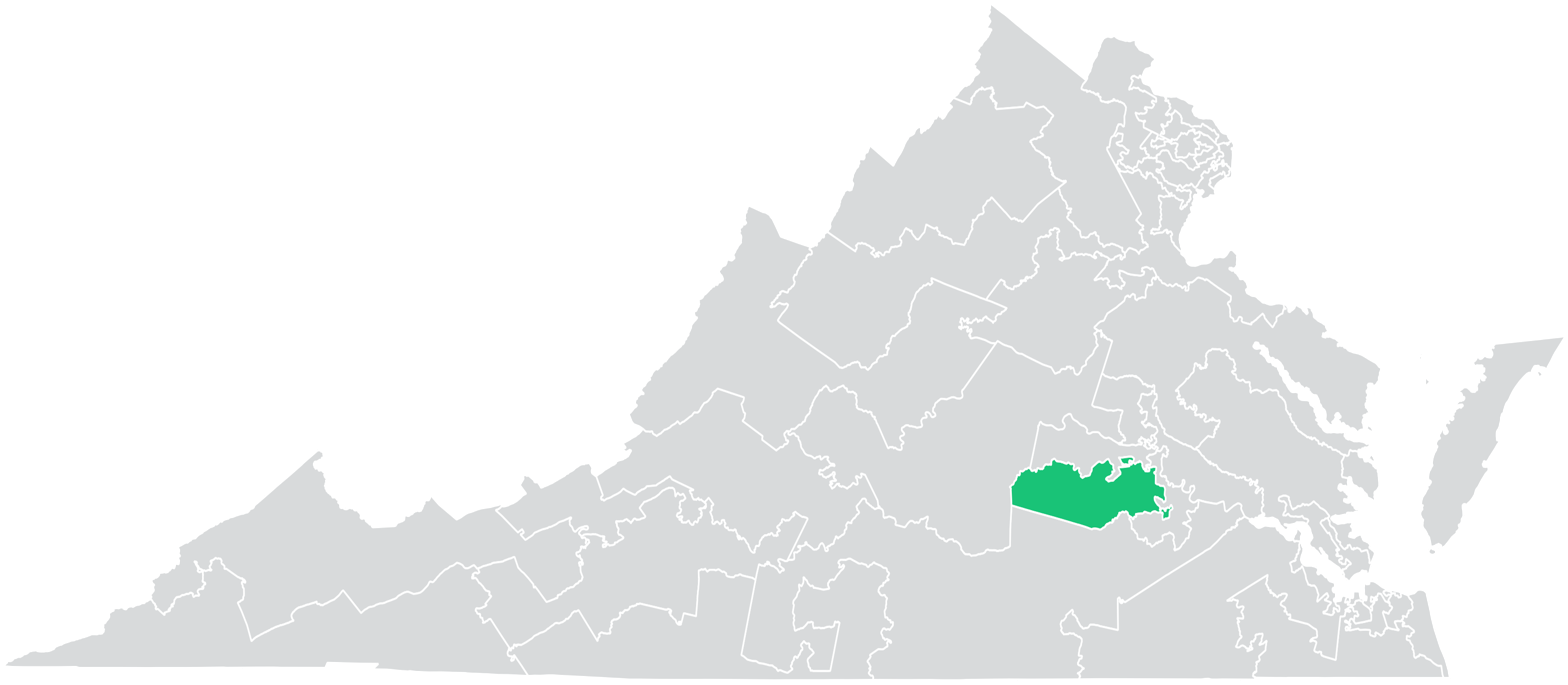
Senator
Creigh Deeds; D–Charlottesville
- Demographics: 65% White; 22% Black; 7% Hispanic; 2% Asian; 3% Other
- Population (2019): 220,908
- Registered voters: 164,769

Virginia's 11th Senate district is one of 40 districts in the Senate of Virginia. It has been represented by Democrat Creigh Deeds since its were borders were completely changed effective for the 2023 election as part of redistricting in Virginia.

== Geography ==
District 11 is located in the western Piedmont region of Virginia, including all of the City of Charlottesville, Albemarle County, Nelson County, and Amherst County, and a small portion of Louisa County.

Before 2024, District 11 was located in the southern Greater Richmond Region, including parts of Chesterfield County and all of Amelia County and the City of Colonial Heights.

== Recent election results ==
=== 2023 ===
2023 Virginia Senate election, District 11
Primary election
Party	Candidate	Votes	%
Democratic	Creigh Deeds	13,623	50.9
Democratic	Sally L. Hudson	13,158	49.1
Total votes		26,781	100
General election
Democratic	Creigh Deeds	48,675	65.6
Republican	Phillip Hamilton	25,416	34.3
Write-in	Various	100	0.1
Total votes		74,191	100
Democratic gain from Republican			

== Historical election results ==
All election results below took place prior to 2023 redistricting, and the district was in a completely different geographic area.

=== 2019 ===
2019 Virginia Senate election, District 11
Primary election
Party	Candidate	Votes	%
Democratic	Amanda Pohl	6,241	78.1
Democratic	E. Wayne Powell	1,747	21.9
Total votes		7,993	100
General election
Republican	Amanda Chase (incumbent)	44,245	54.5
Democratic	Amanda Pohl	36,734	45.3
Total votes		81,168	100
Republican hold			

=== 2015 ===
2015 Virginia Senate election, District 11
Primary election
Party	Candidate	Votes	%
Republican	Amanda Chase	4,907	40.5
Republican	Steve Martin (incumbent)	4,238	34.9
Republican	Barry Moore	2,977	24.6
Total votes		12,126	100
General election
Republican	Amanda Chase	27,218	63.6
Democratic	E. Wayne Powell	15,485	36.2
Total votes		42,814	100
Republican hold			

=== 2011 ===
2011 Virginia Senate election, District 11
Party	Candidate	Votes	%
Republican	Steve Martin (incumbent)	25,269	94.7
Total votes		26,689	100
Republican hold			

All election results below took place prior to 2011 redistricting, and thus were under different district lines.

=== 2007 ===
All election results below took place prior to 2011 redistricting, and thus were under different district lines.

2007 Virginia Senate election, District 11
Party	Candidate	Votes	%
Republican	Steve Martin (incumbent)	16,478	62.5
Democratic	Alex McMurtie, Jr.	4,852	18.4
Independent	Roger Habeck	3,879	14.7
Independent	Hank Cook	1,138	4.3
Total votes		26,348	100
Republican hold			

=== 2003 ===
2003 Virginia Senate election, District 11
Party	Candidate	Votes	%
Republican	Steve Martin (incumbent)	18,702	97.3
Total votes		19,226	100
Republican hold			

=== 1999 ===
1999 Virginia Senate election, District 11
Party	Candidate	Votes	%
Republican	Steve Martin (incumbent)	17,716	64.6
Democratic	William Hastings, Jr.	9,689	35.3
Total votes		27,442	100
Republican hold			

=== 1995 ===
1995 Virginia Senate election, District 11
Party	Candidate	Votes	%
Republican	Steve Martin (incumbent)	28,693	99.4
Total votes		28,863	100
Republican hold			

== Recent results in statewide elections ==
Year	Office	Results
2020	President	Trump 50.5–47.8%
2017	Governor	Gillespie 53.3–45.5%
2016	President	Trump 52.6–42.0%
2014	Senate	Gillespie 55.6–41.2%
2013	Governor	Cuccinelli 52.2–38.5%
2012	President	Romney 56.2–42.6%
2012	Senate	Allen 55.3–44.7%
