= Virginia Information Technologies Agency =

Agency overview
- Formed: 2003
- Jurisdiction: Virginia
- Headquarters: 7325 Beaufont Springs Dr, Richmond, VA 23225
- Agency executive: Robert 'Bob' Osmond, Chief Information Officer
- Parent agency: Virginia Secretary of Administration
- Website: www.vita.virginia.gov

The Virginia Information Technologies Agency (VITA) is an executive department that provides information technology services to other Virginia state agencies. It is headed by Virginia's Chief Information Officer (CIO) who currently is Robert 'Bob' Osmond.

VITA is the designated provider of information technology (IT) services for government agencies and public bodies including local government entities and higher education.

VITA provides computing and telecommunication services, which it groups as ‘custom infrastructure services’ and ‘bundled infrastructure services’. The ‘custom’ services are inclusive of the individual computing services required to process customer applications. The ‘bundled’ services are inclusive of hardware, software, maintenance and support. The rates that VITA charges to its clients are posted on its website and are approved by the Joint Legislative Audit and Review Commission (JLARC). In most cases, VITA charges the same rate to executive branch agencies and to other government entities.

In the 2010 session of the General Assembly, Governor Bob McDonnell proposed legislation (SB 236), which was enacted on March 11, 2010, to have the Virginia Information Technologies Agency report to the Executive Branch instead of an independent board. The law abolished the Information Technology Investment Board (ITIB) and replaced it with a new Information Technology Advisory Council. Under the new arrangement, the Governor appoints the CIO, who reports to the Virginia Secretary of Technology. Currently, VITA resides under the Secretary of Administration as the Secretary of Technology role has been eliminated.

In September 2018, Governor Ralph Northam issued an executive order requiring Virginia state government agencies shift their technology services to cloud based platforms in order to modernize the Commonwealth's IT infrastructure. Additionally, VITA has begun a transition to a multi-vendor IT model (MSI). Towards the end of 2018, VITA terminated a single vendor relationship with Northrop Grumman and settled with the company to the amount of $35.8 million. VITA has implemented a new organizational model which aligned the major service areas of cyber security, operations, and administration. CIO Nelson Moe cited the new model where CAO Dan Wolf and COO Jon Ozovek handle administrative and operations work respectively has freed him up to spend more time in visionary thinking and marketing offerings to the rest of the executive branch.

VITA has successfully implemented and stabilized their MSI model after delays in 2018 and 2019 according to the 2020 JLARC report on VITA. This successful implementation allowed VITA to effectively respond to the technology needs of the state government after a state of emergency was declared on March 12, 2020, related to the COVID-19 pandemic, whereby 75 percent of state agencies were satisfied with VITA's efforts. CIO Nelson Moe praised COO Jon Ozovek regarding these recent developments, indicating "His experience in deploying multisupplier environments and efforts over the past year have been key to our success”. For these efforts, VITA has been awarded a top honor by the National Association of State Chief Information Officers (NASCIO) under the Enterprise IT Management Initiatives category - Virginia Pioneering a New Method of State IT Services Delivery.

As VITA has stabilized their MSI model, the focus appears to have shifted to deploy modern technology services. In June 2021, VITA announced a new messaging contract with a first in the country multiplatform solution giving agencies the option to choose Google or Microsoft for their email and collaboration needs. In addition, VITA has deployed the country's first end-to-end service for Robotic Process Automation in July 2021.
