= George B. Pegram =

American physicist of Project (1876–1958)

- Born: October 24, 1876; Trinity, North Carolina, U.S.
- Died: August 12, 1958 (aged 81); Swarthmore, Pennsylvania, U.S.
- Education: Duke University (AB); Columbia University (PhD)
- Scientific career
- Fields: Physics
- Institutions: Columbia University
- Thesis: Secondary radioactivity in the electrolysis of thorium solutions (1903)
- Doctoral students: John R. Dunning

George Braxton Pegram (October 24, 1876 – August 12, 1958) was an American physicist who played a key role in the technical administration of the Manhattan Project. He graduated from Trinity College (now Duke University) in 1895, and taught high school before becoming a teaching assistant in physics at Columbia University in 1900. He was to spend the rest of his working life at Columbia, taking his doctorate there in 1903 and becoming a full professor in 1918. His administrative career began as early as 1913 when he became the department's executive officer. By 1918, he was Dean of the Faculty of Applied Sciences but he resigned in 1930 to relaunch his research activities, performing many meticulous measurements on the properties of neutrons with John R. Dunning. He was also chairman of Columbia's physics department from 1913 to 1945.

Returning to administration as Dean in 1936, Pegram met Enrico Fermi on his arrival in the United States. In 1940 he brokered a meeting between Fermi and the US Navy at which the prospect of an atomic bomb was raised with the military for the first time. Following Marcus Oliphant's mission to the United States in August 1941 to alert the Americans to its feasibility, Pegram and his colleague Harold C. Urey led a diplomatic mission to the United Kingdom to establish co-operation on development of the atomic bomb. They soon found themselves on Vannevar Bush's S-1 Section coordinating technical research. Columbia's physics department was home to the SAM Laboratories, where many of the key technologies required for the bomb were developed.

After the war Pegram helped found the Brookhaven National Laboratory. He served as vice president of the university 1949 to 1950.

== Early life ==
George Braxton Pegram was born in Trinity, North Carolina, one of the five children of William Howell Pegram, a professor of chemistry at Trinity College (now Duke University), and Emma, daughter of Braxton Craven, the college's founder and first president. He had two brothers and two sisters, all of whom graduated from Trinity College. His upbringing in the academic atmosphere of the campus left him with an appetite for careful methodical work and an inherent diplomacy.

Pegram graduated from Trinity College with a Bachelor of Arts (AB) degree in 1895, served briefly as the college librarian, and then became a high school teacher. He entered Columbia University in 1900, becoming an assistant in physics. He published his first two papers, on radioactive materials, the following year, and wrote his 1903 Doctor of Philosophy (PhD) thesis on "Secondary radioactivity in the electrolysis of thorium solutions". It was published in the Physical Review that year. During the summer break in 1905, he worked for the United States Coast and Geodetic Survey on measuring the Earth's magnetic field at its observation stations.

In those days, promising American scholars in physics would normally further their education overseas. Pegram was awarded a John Tyndall Fellowship for this purpose in 1907, and went to Germany, where he attended lectures at the Humboldt University of Berlin given by Max Planck and Walther Nernst. In 1908, he moved on to the University of Cambridge in England, where he heard lectures given by Sir Joseph Larmor. In his travels he visited some twenty European universities, and he met Florence Bement, a Wellesley College graduate from Boston. They renewed their acquaintance after they returned to the United States, and were married at her aunt's home in West Newton, Massachusetts on June 3, 1909. They had two sons, William, born in 1910, and John, born in 1916.

== Early career ==
On returning to the United States in 1909, Pegram was appointed an assistant professor at Columbia. He became an associate professor in 1912, and a full professor in 1918. He became the head of the physics department on the death of William Hallock in 1913, and held this position until 1945. He also became acting Dean of Columbia's School of Mines, Engineering, and Chemistry in 1917, and was its dean from 1918 until 1930. During World War I he served on the administrative board of the Student Army Training Corps at Columbia. Classes commenced on October 1, 1918, with some 2,500 students. He was also dean of the US Army Radio School, US Army School of Photography, and US Army School of Explosives there, and was Director of Research of the United States Army Signal Corps.

In 1917 and 1918, Pegram served on a committee established by the National Research Council headed by the president of Columbia University, Nicholas Murray Butler, with Michael I. Pupin as its secretary, that created a quartz piezo-electric sound detector for locating submerged submarines. The device worked, and the Naval Experimental Station at New London, Connecticut, took over its development in September 1918. He was awarded an honorary Doctor of Science degree by Duke University in 1918.

Tired of administrative work, which kept him away from his research, Pegram asked Butler to relieve him of the position of dean in 1930. This request was accepted, in spite of Pegram's demonstrated ability as an administrator. His achievements included the construction of the Pupin Physics Laboratories. Pegram was intimately involved in its design, insisting on a structure without load bearing internal walls, so that it could be reconfigured over time, and with large two-storey lecture theatres. He attempted to expose his physics students to ideas from Europe, inviting Hendrik Lorentz, Larmor, Planck, Max Born and Werner Heisenberg to visit Columbia.

Pegram's research focus remained on radioactivity. In 1929, he had recruited a graduate student, John R. Dunning, from Nebraska Wesleyan University, who built a linear amplifier. In 1935 and 1936 Dunning was able construct a cyclotron using many salvaged parts to reduce costs and funding from industrial and private donations. James Chadwick's discovery of the neutron in 1932 sparked a flurry of research into neutrons by Pegram and Dunning. Between 1933 and 1936, they would work together on two dozen papers, all on neutrons. He also collaborated with Harold Urey on separating oxygen isotopes. This period came to an abrupt end when Howard Lee McBain died suddenly on May 7, 1936, and Pegram became dean again on January 1, 1937.

A sympathetic administrator proved vital to building up the physics department at Columbia. Pegram hired Isidor Isaac Rabi as a theoretical physicist on Heisenberg's advice. Rabi would later succeed Pegram as chairman of the physics department. When Pegram heard that Nobel Prize-winning physicist Enrico Fermi wanted to emigrate to the United States with his family to escape Italian Racial Laws that affected his Jewish wife Laura, Pegram was quick to offer a position at Columbia. Recruiting Fermi was a coup; he had offers from four other universities, and Pegram was on the wharf to greet Fermi on his arrival in New York on January 2, 1939. Pegram supported the work of Leo Szilard, granting him access to facilities and laboratory space in the Pupin Physics Laboratories. Other scientists working at Columbia in 1939 included Herbert L. Anderson, Eugene T. Booth, G. Norris Glasoe, Francis G. Slack and Walter Zinn, making it one of the world's most important centers for nuclear physics.

== Manhattan Project ==
The discovery of nuclear fission by Otto Hahn and Fritz Strassmann, followed by its explanation by Lise Meitner and Otto Frisch in December 1938, ignited a flurry of activity, with nearly one hundred articles on the subject published by the end of 1939. At Columbia, Enrico Fermi and John R. Dunning were quick to verify Hahn's and Strassmann's results, and there was a lively debate over whether uranium-235 or its more abundant uranium-238 isotope was primarily responsible. Two groups began working at Columbia on attempting to create a nuclear chain reaction in natural uranium. Both were in the Pupin Physics Laboratories, but working independently, at least initially, and on different floors: Fermi and Anderson in the basement, and Szilard and Zin on the seventh floor.

In March 1939, Fermi, Szilard and Eugene Wigner met with Pegram in his office, and urged that their results be brought to the attention of the government. Pegram knew Charles Edison, the Assistant Secretary of the Navy, and arranged for Fermi to meet with Rear Admiral Stanford C. Hooper, the technical assistant to the Chief of Naval Operations. Echoing sentiments his father had articulated back in 1911, Pegram informed Hooper that uranium chain reaction might "liberate a million times as much energy per pound as any known explosive." Szilard, Wigner and Albert Einstein took their concerns to the president Franklin Roosevelt in the Einstein-Szilard letter. This prompted the creation of an Advisory Committee on Uranium under Lyman J. Briggs, the director of the National Bureau of Standards. On March 11, 1941, Pegram informed the Committee that it was "very doubtful whether a chain reaction can be established without separating 235 from the rest of the uranium." He therefore recommended that efforts be concentrated on finding a means of separating the isotopes.

Initially, Fermi and Anderson had used a tank of water as a neutron moderator. The hydrogen in the water was good at slowing neutrons, which was desirable, but it also absorbed them, which was not. In July 1939, Szilard suggested using carbon in the form of graphite instead. Pegram attended the Advisory Committee on Uranium meeting on April 27, along with Fermi, Szilard and Wigner where the prospects for a chain reaction were discussed. On May 14, he was able to report that Szilard and Fermi had found that graphite indeed had a small neutron absorption cross section, and would make an effective moderator. Pegram brought in members of the football team to stack graphite blocks, and purchased uranium from the Eldorado Mining and Refining Limited in Canada. The uranium and graphite "pile", as Fermi called it, soon grew too large for the Pupin Physics Laboratories. Fermi recalled that:

We went to Dean Pegram, who was then the man who could carry out magic around the University, and we explained to him that we needed a big room. He scouted around the campus and we went with him to dark corridors and under various heating pipes and so on, to visit possible sites for this experiment and eventually a big room was discovered in Schermerhorn Hall.

By September 1941, they had built a uranium and graphite cube 8 feet (2.4 m) high there.

The Advisory Committee on Uranium was placed under Vannevar Bush's National Defense Research Committee when it was established in June 1940, and Pegram was added to its membership. Following Mark Oliphant's mission to the United States in August 1941 to alert the Americans to the atomic bomb's feasibility, Pegram and his Urey led a diplomatic mission to the United Kingdom to establish co-operation on development of the atomic bomb. In December 1941, the S-1 Uranium Committee was placed directly under Bush's Office of Scientific Research and Development, with the word "uranium" dropped for security reasons. James Conant became its chairman, with Pegram as his vice chairman. The United States' entry into World War II following the Japanese attack on Pearl Harbor gave the project a new urgency when the S-1 Committee next met on December 18, 1941.

In August 1942 the United States Army took over the effort, which became the Manhattan Project. The S-1 Committee was reorganised as the S-1 Executive Committee, and Pegram dropped out. Columbia's physics department became home to the SAM Laboratories, where many of the key technologies required for the bomb were developed by over 700 researchers. Pegram chaired Columbia's Committee on War Research. He worked closely with the Navy Underwater Sound Laboratory on a number of projects, most notably the development of the Magnetic Airborne Detector (MAD) at Columbia's Airborne Instruments Laboratory at Mineola on Long Island.

== Later life ==
Despite its early involvement and important role, the Manhattan Project had not been kind to Columbia. Arthur Compton had concentrated nuclear reactor research at the University of Chicago in 1942. After the war, scientists there had access to the research reactors at the government-sponsored Argonne National Laboratory, and Fermi and Urey were lured away to Chicago. When the war ended in August 1945, the Physics Department at Columbia had five vacant chairs. Filling them would be no easy task. Physicists were hailed as heroes, and every major university was eager to recruit the best ones to build up their departments. They were offered high salaries, and when they left they often took their students and post-doctoral assistants with them. Even the quintessential New Yorker Rabi was tempted to leave rather than return to Columbia from his wartime work at the MIT Radiation Laboratory. He offered to stay, but one condition:

I [Rabi] went to the chairman, Dean Pegram, a very fine person, a brilliant man. He was on most important committees of the university. He also had been chairman of the Physics Department for some twenty years. I said to him, "I'll come back, but I have to be the chairman. I have to work this out, and I have to work this out in my way. Well, he did it. He was my patron, actually, and I asked him to vacate his job. I don't think the department would have elected me necessarily. But Pegram was a very powerful man, and he was so universally respected that he just had to suggest it in his way and it was done.

Rabi felt that to compete with the University of Chicago, Columbia needed to have access to a research reactor too; but the cost was greater than Columbia could afford without collaborating with other institutions, government assistance, or both. On January 16, 1946, Pegram convened a meeting of representatives of 16 different colleges, universities, hospitals and research institutions like the Bell Telephone Laboratories. The meeting drafted a request to the director of the Manhattan Project, Major General Leslie R. Groves, Jr., asking him to establish a regional research laboratory near New York City. In response, Groves sent Colonel Kenneth Nichols to meet with Pegram and Rabi and their opposite numbers from Princeton University, Hugh S. Taylor and Henry D. Smyth on February 8. They found Nichols amenable to their idea; all he wanted to know was where it would be built, and who would run it.

Getting agreement on this required all of Pegram's negotiating talents, since MIT wanted the facility located in Boston. Pegram assembled a group of nine universities, Columbia, Cornell, Harvard, Johns Hopkins, MIT, Princeton, Penn, Rochester, and Yale, as the Initiatory University Group (IUG), and he persuaded Groves to provide initial funding for the project. Lee DuBridge was appointed as the head of the IUG. Finding a site that was both accessible and remote proved to be a challenge, but eventually one of found at Camp Upton on Long Island. The new research center became the Brookhaven National Laboratory.

Although no longer chairman of the Physics Department, Pegram remained the dean until 1949. He also chaired Columbia's Committee on Government-Aided Research from 1945 to 1950 and again from 1951 to 1956, and vice president of the university 1949 to 1950, when Dwight Eisenhower was university president. In addition, Pegram was involved with a number of professional organizations. He attended the first meeting of the American Physical Society in 1899, and was its treasurer from 1918 to 1957, also serving as its president in 1941. He was also treasurer of Sigma Xi from 1917 to 1949, serving as its president from 1949 to 1951, and of the American Institute of Physics, which he helped to found, from 1938 to 1956, and its secretary too from 1931 to 1945. He was also a member of both the American Philosophical Society and the United States National Academy of Sciences.

Pegram died in Swarthmore, Pennsylvania on August 12, 1958. His papers are in the Columbia University Library.
