= S-1 Executive Committee =

Group that helped initiate the Manhattan Project

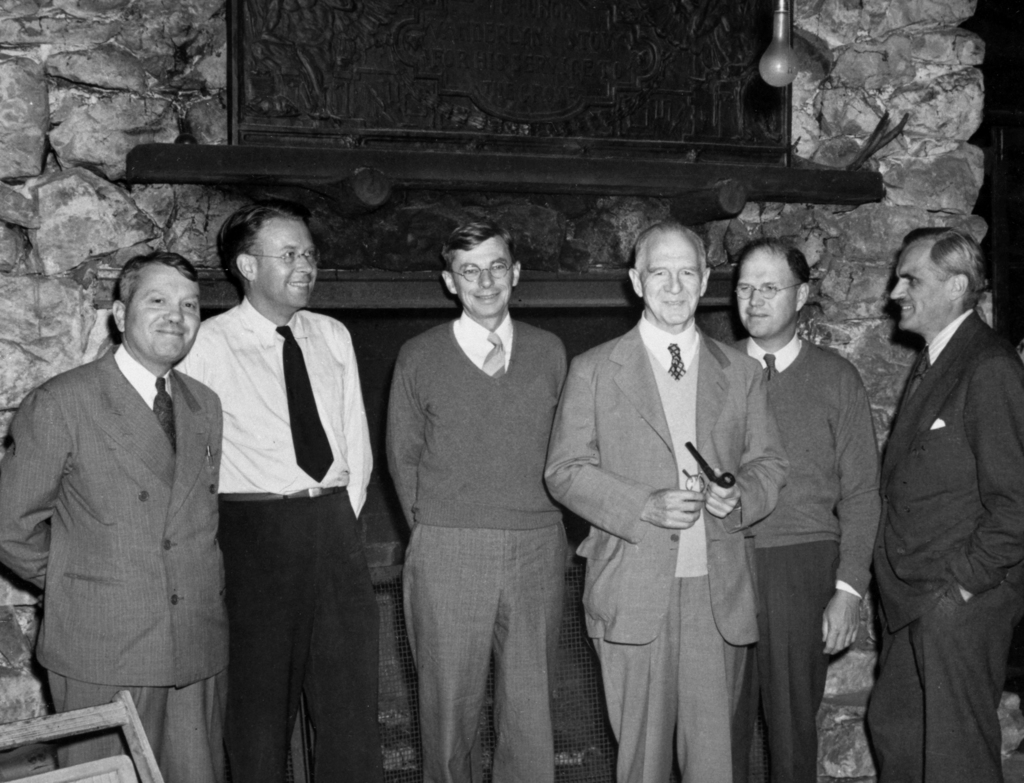
The S-1 Executive Committee at the Bohemian Grove on September 13, 1942. From left to right: Harold C. Urey, Ernest O. Lawrence, James B. Conant, Lyman J. Briggs, E. V. Murphree and Arthur Compton

The S-1 Executive Committee laid the groundwork for the Manhattan Project by initiating and coordinating the early research efforts in the United States, and liaising with the Tube Alloys Project in Britain.

In the wake of the discovery of nuclear fission in December 1938, the possibility that Nazi Germany might develop nuclear weapons prompted Leo Szilard and Eugene Wigner to draft the Einstein–Szilárd letter to the president of the United States, Franklin D. Roosevelt, in August 1939. In response, the Advisory Committee on Uranium was created at the National Bureau of Standards under the chairmanship of Lyman J. Briggs to determine the feasibility of nuclear weapons. In June 1940, the National Defense Research Committee (NDRC) was created to coordinate defense-related research, and the Advisory Committee on Uranium became the Uranium Committee of the NDRC. In June 1941, Roosevelt created the Office of Scientific Research and Development under the leadership of Vannevar Bush (OSRD), at it incorporated the NDRC, now under James B. Conant. The Uranium Committee became the Uranium Section of the OSRD, which was soon renamed the S-1 Section for security reasons. By May 1942, it was felt that the S-1 Section had become too unwieldy, and in June 1942, was replaced by the smaller S-1 Executive Committee.

The feasibility of nuclear weapons was demonstrated by the British MAUD Committee, and its results were shared with the Advisory Committee on Uranium by the Tizard Mission. The S-1 Section coordinated research into nuclear weapons in United States, in cooperation with the British Tube Alloys project. The United States Army created the Manhattan District in June 1942, and took over responsibility for the development of nuclear weapons from the S-1 Executive Committee in September 1942. The OSRD's S-1 research and development contracts were terminated as they lapsed, and production contracts were terminated and transferred to the Army. Although the S-1 Executive Committee remained as an advisory body, it became inactive. The OSRD and NDRC continued to influence the Manhattan Project through the participation of Bush and Conant in the Military Policy Committee that controlled what became the Manhattan Project.

== Origins ==
The discovery of nuclear fission in December 1938, reported in the January 6, 1939 issue of Die Naturwissenschaften by Otto Hahn, and Fritz Strassmann, and its correct identification as nuclear fission by Lise Meitner in the February 11, 1939 issue of Nature, generated intense interest among physicists. Even before publication, the news was brought to the United States by Danish physicist Niels Bohr, who opened the fifth Washington Conference on Theoretical Physics with Enrico Fermi on January 26, 1939. The results were quickly corroborated by experimental physicists, most notably Fermi and John R. Dunning at Columbia University.

The possibility that Nazi Germany might develop nuclear weapons was particularly alarming to refugee scientists from Germany and other fascist countries, many of whom had left Europe in the 1930s. Two of them, Leo Szilard and Eugene Wigner drafted the Einstein–Szilárd letter to the President of the United States, Franklin D. Roosevelt. It advised Roosevelt of the existence of the German nuclear weapon project, warned that it was likely the Germans were working on an atomic bomb using uranium, and urged that the United States secure sources of uranium and conduct research into nuclear weapon technology. The letter was signed by Albert Einstein on August 2, 1939, but its delivery was delayed because of the outbreak of World War II in Europe with the German invasion of Poland in September 1939. The letter was eventually hand-delivered to Roosevelt by the economist Alexander Sachs on October 11, 1939. On that date he met with the President, the President's secretary, Brigadier General Edwin "Pa" Watson, and two ordnance experts, Army Lieutenant Colonel Keith F. Adamson and Navy Commander Gilbert C. Hoover. Roosevelt summed up the conversation as: "Alex, what you are after is to see that the Nazis don't blow us up." He told Watson: "This requires action."

== Advisory Committee on Uranium ==
As a result of the letter Roosevelt asked scientist Lyman J. Briggs, the director of the National Bureau of Standards, to organize an Advisory Committee on Uranium. Federal advisory committees had been a feature of the federal government since 1794, when George Washington had appointed one to investigate the Whiskey Rebellion. Most are short-lived, terminating after a couple of years, with their membership changing when a new president takes office. The committee consisted of Briggs, Adamson and Hoover. Its first meeting was held on October 21, 1939, at the National Bureau of Standards in Washington, D.C. In addition to the committee members, it was attended by physicists Fred L. Mohler from the National Bureau of Standards and Richard B. Roberts from the Carnegie Institution of Washington, and Szilárd, Wigner and Edward Teller. Einstein was invited but declined to attend. Adamson was skeptical about the prospect of building an atomic bomb, but was willing to authorize $6,000 (equivalent to $138,000 in 2025 current dollars) for the purchase of uranium and graphite for Szilárd and Fermi's experiments into producing a nuclear chain reaction at Columbia University.

The Advisory Committee on Uranium reported to the President on November 1, 1939. While acknowledging that the science was unproven and that nuclear chain reaction was no more than a theoretical possibility, it foresaw that nuclear energy might be used as propulsion for submarines, and that an atomic bomb "would provide a possible source of bombs with a destructiveness vastly greater than anything now known." The committee recommended that the government purchase 50 short tons (45 t) of uranium oxide and 4 short tons (3.6 t) of graphite for chain reaction experiments. It also recommended that Einstein, Karl Compton, George B. Pegram, and Sachs be added to the committee. When he read the report, Sachs felt that it was too academic and failed to make its points forcefully.

Experiments with the fission of uranium were already proceeding at universities and research institutes in the United States. Alfred Lee Loomis was supporting Ernest Lawrence at the Berkeley Radiation Laboratory. Vannevar Bush was also doing similar research at the Carnegie Institution. At Columbia, while Fermi and Szilard investigated the possibility of creating a nuclear chain reaction, Dunning considered the possibility, advanced by Niels Bohr and John A. Wheeler but discounted by Fermi, that it was the rare uranium-235 isotope of uranium that was primarily responsible for fission. He had Alfred O. C. Nier from the University of Minnesota prepare samples of uranium enriched in uranium-234, uranium-235 and uranium-238 using a mass spectrometer.

These were ready in February 1940, and Dunning, Eugene T. Booth and Aristid von Grosse then carried out a series of experiments. They demonstrated that uranium-235 was indeed primarily responsible for fission with slow neutrons, but were unable to determine precise neutron capture cross sections because their samples were not sufficiently enriched. Pegram forwarded the results to Briggs on March 11, 1940; they were subsequently published to the Physical Review's March 15 and April 15, 1940 issues. Briggs reported to Watson on April 9 that it was doubtful that a chain reaction could be initiated in uranium without uranium enrichment, and therefore urged that research be undertaken into isotope separation technology. Nier, Booth, Dunning and von Grosse's results were discussed by Jesse Beams, Ross Gunn, Fermi, Nier, Merle Tuve and Harold Urey at the spring meeting of the American Physical Society in Washington, D.C., in the last week of April 1940. The New York Times reported that conferees argued "the probability of some scientist blowing up a sizable portion of the earth with a tiny bit of uranium."

The Advisory Committee on Uranium met again at the National Bureau of Standards on April 27, 1940. This time they were joined by Rear Admiral Harold G. Bowen, Sr., the director of the Naval Research Laboratory (NRL), along with Sachs, Pegram, Fermi, Szilard, and Wigner. Once again, Einstein, although invited, declined to attend. The meeting highlighted differences between the optimistic Szilard and Sachs, and the more cautious Fermi. The committee agreed to proceed with the work at Columbia, which it hoped would demonstrate whether or not a chain reaction was possible. Bowen and Gunn suggested the creation of a scientific subcommittee to advise the Advisory Committee on Uranium. Tuve and Vannevar Bush at the Carnegie Institution, expressed interest in this, and Briggs created it. Chaired by Briggs, its membership consisted of Urey, Pegram, Tuve, Beams, Gunn, and Gregory Breit. The scientific subcommittee met for the first time on June 13, 1940, at the National Bureau of Standards. It reviewed the work thus far and recommended increased support for research into both nuclear chain reactions and isotope separation.

The German invasion of Belgium in May 1940 generated concern over the fate of uranium ore from the Belgian Congo, the world's largest source; the subsequent Battle of France created alarm in the administration over the direction the war was taking. On June 12, 1940, Bush and Harry Hopkins went to the president with a proposal to create a National Defense Research Committee (NDRC) to coordinate defense-related research. The NDRC was formally created on June 27, 1940, with Bush as its chairman. It immediately absorbed the Advisory Committee on Uranium, which was indeed one of its purposes. Bush immediately reorganised the Advisory Committee on Uranium as the NDRC Committee on Uranium, reporting directly to him. Briggs remained chairman, but Hoover and Adamson were dropped from its membership, while Tuve, Pegram, Beams, Gunn, and Urey were added. For security reasons, no foreign-born scientists were appointed to the Uranium Committee. Publication of research into uranium, fission and isotope separation was now banned.

== MAUD committee ==
Meanwhile, Otto Frisch and Rudolf Peierls, two researchers at the University of Birmingham in England, who ironically had been assigned to investigate nuclear weapons by Mark Oliphant because, as enemy aliens in Britain, they were ineligible to participate in secret war work, issued the Frisch–Peierls memorandum in March 1940. The memorandum contradicted the common thinking of the time that many tons of uranium would be needed to make a bomb, requiring delivery by ship. The calculation in the memorandum showed that a bomb might be possible using as little as 1 to 10 kilograms (2.2 to 22.0 lb) of pure uranium-235, which would be quite practical for aircraft to carry.

Oliphant took the memorandum on to Henry Tizard, and the MAUD Committee was established to investigate further. It concluded that an atomic bomb was not only technically feasible, but could be produced in as little as two years. The Committee unanimously recommended pursuing the development of an atomic bomb as a matter of urgency, although it recognised that the resources required might be beyond those available to Britain. The MAUD Committee completed the MAUD report on July 15, 1941, and disbanded. The report had two parts; the first concluded that a uranium-235 bomb could be feasible in as little as two years using 25 pounds (11 kg) of uranium-235 with a yield equivalent to 1,800 tonnes of TNT (7,500 GJ); the second concluded that the controlled fission be a source of energy for powering machines and a source of radio-isotopes. As a result of the MAUD Committee report, the British started an atomic bomb program under the codename Tube Alloys.

== Further British developments ==
Urey began considering isotope separation methods. The centrifuge process was regarded as the most promising. Beams had developed such a process at the University of Virginia during the 1930s, but had encountered technical difficulties. The process required high rotational speeds, but at certain speeds harmonic vibrations developed that threatened to tear the machinery apart. It was therefore necessary to accelerate quickly through these speeds. In 1941 he began working with uranium hexafluoride, the only known gaseous compound of uranium, and was able to separate uranium-235. At Columbia, Urey had Karl P. Cohen investigate the process, and he produced a body of mathematical theory making it possible to design a centrifugal separation unit, which Westinghouse undertook to construct. Another possibility was gaseous diffusion, which George B. Kistiakowsky suggested at a lunch on May 21, 1940.

The September 1940 Tizard Mission shared the British results with the Americans, but this only made them aware that they were behind the British, and possibly the Germans too. On April 15, 1941, Briggs received a note from Rudolf Ladenburg, a physicist at Princeton University, stating:

It may interest you that a colleague of mine who arrived from Berlin via Lisbon a few days ago, brought the following message: a reliable colleague who is working at a technical research laboratory asked him to let us know that a large number of German physicists are working intensively on the problem of the uranium bomb under direction of Heisenberg, that Heisenberg himself tries to delay the work as much as possible, fearing catastrophic results of a success. But he cannot help fulfilling the orders given to him, and if the problem can be solved, it will be solved probably in the near future. So he gave the advice to us to hurry up if U.S.A. will not come too late.

Bush therefore commissioned a review of the uranium project by the National Academy of Sciences. The review committee was chaired by Arthur Compton, with physicists Ernest O. Lawrence, John C. Slater, and John H. Van Vleck and chemist William D. Coolidge as its other members. It issued a favorable report on May 17, 1941, recommending an intensified effort, but Bush was troubled by the emphasis on nuclear power instead of nuclear weapons, and had two engineers, Oliver E. Buckley from the Bell Telephone Laboratories and L. Warrington Chubb from Westinghouse added to produce a second report with an emphasis on estimating how soon practical benefits could be expected.

== S-1 Section ==
The work of Briggs' committee was seen as insufficiently urgent by some of the scientists who were familiar with it. Karl T. Compton complained in early 1941:

As I analyze the situation, Briggs, who is by nature slow, conservative, methodical and accustomed to operate at peace-time government bureau tempo, has been following a policy consistent with these qualities and still further inhibited by the requirement of secrecy. . . . Considered as an element of the present war emergency, speed in attaining the objective is certainly more important than excessive secrecy, as would be abundantly evident if the German scientists should actually get some of the applications into use.

On June 28, 1941, Roosevelt issued Executive Order 8807, creating the Office of Scientific Research and Development (OSRD), with Bush as its director personally responsible to the president. The new organisation subsumed the NDRC, now chaired by James B. Conant. The Uranium Committee became the Uranium Section of the OSRD, which was soon renamed the S-1 Section for security reasons. To the S-1 Section, Bush added Samuel K. Allison, Breit, Edward U. Condon, Lloyd P. Smith and Henry D. Smyth; Gunn was dropped in line with an NDRC policy not to have Army or Navy personnel in the sections. Briggs remained the chairman, with Pegram as the vice chairman.

In line with the president's wishes, matters of policy were restricted to the president, Wallace, Bush, Conant, Secretary of War Henry Stimson and the Chief of Staff of the Army, General George C. Marshall. To implement this, the S-1 Section was placed outside NDRC, directly under Bush, who could authorize purchases. Harold D. Smith, the director of the Bureau of the Budget, gave Bush assurances that should OSRD resources prove insufficient, additional funding would be made available from monies controlled by the president.

Oliphant flew to the United States from England in August 1941 to find out why Briggs and his committee were apparently ignoring the MAUD Report. Oliphant discovered to his dismay that the reports and other documents sent directly to Briggs had not been shared with all members of the committee; Briggs had locked them in a safe. Oliphant then met with Allison, Coolidge, Conant and Fermi to explain the urgency. In these meetings Oliphant spoke of an atomic bomb with forcefulness and certainty, and explained that Britain did not have the resources to undertake the project alone, so it was up to the United States.

Bush met with Roosevelt and his vice president, Henry Wallace, on October 9, 1941, and briefed them on the S-1 Section's progress. He personally delivered a third report from Arthur Compton, dated November 1, to Roosevelt on November 19, 1941. On December 6, 1941, Bush held a meeting to organize an accelerated research project managed by Compton, with Urey researching gaseous diffusion for uranium enrichment and Lawrence researching electromagnetic enrichment techniques.

The next day, the Japanese attack on Pearl Harbor led to the United States entry into the war. With the United States at war, funding was now available in amounts undreamt of the year before. When, at the S-1 Section meeting on December 18, 1941, Lawrence asked for $400,000 for electromagnetic separation, the section immediately recommended granting it. Compton was allocated $340,000 for nuclear reactor research at Columbia and Princeton, and $278,000 at the University of Chicago. Another $500,000 was earmarked for raw materials. His proposed schedule was no less breathtaking: to produce a nuclear chain reaction by July 1942, and an atomic bomb by January 1945. In January 1942, he created the Metallurgical Laboratory, centralizing the work at the University of Chicago.

== S-1 Executive Committee ==
The March 9, 1942, meeting of the S-1 Section was attended by Brigadier General Wilhelm D. Styer, the chief of staff of the newly created United States Army Services of Supply. OSRD contracts were due to expire at the end of June, and with the country at war, there was intense competition for raw materials. It was agreed that in 1942–43, the Army would fund $53 million of the $85 million program. On June 18, 1942, Colonel James C. Marshall was ordered to organize the Army component of the project.

Marshall established his district headquarters on the 18th floor of 270 Broadway in New York City. He chose the name Development of Substitute Materials (DSM), but this would not stick. Colonel Leslie R. Groves, Jr., the head of the Construction Branch in the Office of the Chief of Engineers thought it would attract undue attention. Instead, the new district was given the innocuous name of the Manhattan Engineer District, following the usual practice of naming engineer districts after the city in which their headquarters was located. The name of the project soon followed suit. It was formally established by the Chief of Engineers, Major General Eugene Reybold on August 16, 1942.

By May 1942, Conant felt that the S-1 Section had become too unwieldy. It had not met since the March meeting. When he needed expert advice in May, he had called upon a smaller group, and he recommended that this supervise the OSRD work, mainly the technical and contractual aspects of the project, while the Army handled engineering, construction and site selection. Procurement was an OSRD responsibility, but it could turn to the Army for help in case of difficulties. Bush obtained the president's approval for this, and on June 19, 1942, he abolished the S-1 Section and replaced it with the S-1 Executive Committee. Conant was appointed as its chairman, and Briggs, Compton, Lawrence, Eger Murphree, and Urey as its other members.

S-1 Executive Committee meetings were held on June 25, July 9, July 30, August 26, September 13–14, September 26, October 23–24, November 14, December 9, and December 19, 1942, and January 14, February 10–11, March 18, April 29, and September 10–11, 1943. Its first meeting on June 25, 1942 was attended by Bush, Styer and Colonels Marshall and Kenneth Nichols. It discussed the acquisition of land for the project's production facilities, which the Army recommended be in the vicinity of Knoxville, Tennessee, with the Boston firm of Stone & Webster as the project's principal contractor. The meeting on July 30, 1942, was devoted to reviewing progress on isotope separation by the centrifugal and gaseous diffusion methods. The August 26, 1942, meeting considered Lawrence's electromagnetic separation project, and expansion of the program to produce heavy water.

The September 1942 meeting was held at Bohemian Grove. Nichols and Major Thomas T. Crenshaw, Jr., attended, along with physicist Robert Oppenheimer. This meeting resolved most of the outstanding issues confronting the project, but Bush and Conant felt that the time had now come for the Army to take over the project, something that had already been approved by the president on June 17, 1942. After some discussion, it was decided that Groves, who would be promoted to the rank of brigadier general, would become the director of the Manhattan Project on September 23, 1942. He would be answerable to the Military Policy Committee (MPC), which would consist of Styer, Bush (with Conant as his alternate) and Rear Admiral William R. Purnell.

The Army took full control over the OSRD's research and development contracts as they lapsed. Production contracts were terminated and transferred to the Army, mostly on March 31, 1943. While the S-1 Executive Committee remained as an advisory body, it became inactive, although not formally dissolved. Bush and Conant continued to influence the Manhattan Project through participation in the MPC.

Expenditure by NDRC and OSRD on atomic energy
Organization	Date	Expenditure
NDRC (of CND)	June 27, 1940 – June 28, 1941	$468,000.00
NDRC (of OSRD)	June 28, 1941 – December 1941	$452,650.00
S-1 Section	January–June 1942	$1,952,168.00
Planning Board of OSRD	January–June 1942	$2,224,392.77
S-1 Executive Committee	June 1942 – September 1943	$13,041,037.57
