= Francis G. Slack =

American physicist

Francis Goddard Slack (November 1, 1897 – February 2, 1985) was an American physicist. He was a physics teacher, researcher, and administrator in academia who was renowned for placing equal emphasis on teaching and on research.

== Education ==
Slack was born in Superior, Wisconsin on November 1, 1897. He received his B.S. degree from the University of Georgia in 1918. Thereupon, he entered the United States Army, where he was trained and commissioned as a pilot; he did not see combat in World War I, as the war ended before his graduation from pilot training. In 1921, he entered Columbia University; he received his Ph.D. degree in physics in 1926. Between his entry and graduation from Columbia, Slack spent a period of study and research with Arnold Sommerfeld at his Institute of Theoretical Physics at the Ludwig-Maximilians-Universität München.

== Career ==
Slack remained at Columbia for a period after receipt of his doctorate. In 1928, he became an associate professor of physics at Vanderbilt University, where his focus was on strengthening both teaching and research. At Vanderbilt, he organized and equipped an advanced laboratory in which students could learn the fundamentals of electrical measurement in the performance of the famous experiments which measured the fundamental constants such as the charge of the electron (q), the electron's mass-to-charge ratio (m/q), and the Planck constant (h). In 1931 he was elected a Fellow of the American Physical Society.

In 1939, Slack was appointed Professor of Physics and head of the Vanderbilt Department of Physics. He advocated and practiced equal emphasis on teaching and on research in his academic career as a physics teacher, researcher, and administrator. While at Vanderbilt, Slack maintained ties with his alma mater Columbia University.

In December 1938, the German chemists Otto Hahn and Fritz Strassmann sent a manuscript to Naturwissenschaften reporting they had detected the element barium after bombarding uranium with neutrons; they communicated these results to Lise Meitner. Meitner, and her nephew Otto Robert Frisch, who correctly interpreted these results as being nuclear fission. Frisch confirmed this experimentally on 13 January 1939. In 1944, Hahn received the Nobel Prize for Chemistry for the discovery of nuclear fission. Some historians have documented the history of the discovery of nuclear fission and believe Meitner should have been awarded the Nobel Prize with Hahn.

Even before it was published, Meitner's and Frisch's interpretation of the work of Hahn and Strassmann crossed the Atlantic Ocean with Niels Bohr, who was to lecture at Princeton University. Isidor Isaac Rabi and Willis Lamb, two Columbia University physicists working at Princeton, heard the news and carried it back to Columbia. Rabi said he told Fermi; Fermi gave credit to Lamb. It was soon clear to a number of scientists at Columbia that they should try to detect the energy released in the nuclear fission of uranium from neutron bombardment. On 25 January 1939, Slack was a member of the experimental team at Columbia University which conducted the first nuclear fission experiment in the United States, which was conducted in the basement of Pupin Hall; the other members of the team were Herbert L. Anderson, Eugene T. Booth, John R. Dunning, Enrico Fermi, and G. Norris Glasoe.

During the Manhattan Project, Slack returned to Columbia to work with Dunning, who was conducting pioneering work on gaseous diffusion to separate uranium isotopes; others working on the project included Booth, Henry A. Boorse, Willard F. Libby, and Alfred O. C. Nier.

Slack was on the Editorial Advisory Board (formerly called Associate Editors) of the American Journal of Physics from 1941 to 1943.

== Selected Literature ==
- Slack, Francis G. (1926-07-01). "The Duration of Radiation Excited in Hydrogen by 10.2 Volt Electron Impacts". Physical Review. 28 (1). American Physical Society (APS): 1–12. Bibcode:1926PhRv...28....1S. doi:10.1103/physrev.28.1. ISSN 0031-899X.
- Slack, Francis G. (1927). "Die Intensitätsdissymmetrie beim Wasserstoff-Starkeffekt". Annalen der Physik (in German). 387 (4). Wiley: 576–584. Bibcode:1927AnP...387..576S. doi:10.1002/andp.19273870407. ISSN 0003-3804.
- Slack, Francis G. (1928-04-01). "Intensities in the Hydrogen Spectral Series". Physical Review. 31 (4). American Physical Society (APS): 527–532. Bibcode:1928PhRv...31..527S. doi:10.1103/physrev.31.527. ISSN 0031-899X.
- Slack, Francis G. (1930). "An Arrangement for Obtaining a Steady Flow of Gas at a Constant Low Pressure". Review of Scientific Instruments. 1 (1). AIP Publishing: 33–35. Bibcode:1930RScI....1...33S. doi:10.1063/1.1748633. ISSN 0034-6748.
- Slack, Francis G. (1930-05-15). "The Hydrogen Atom in the Stark Effect". Physical Review. 35 (10). American Physical Society (APS): 1170–1176. Bibcode:1930PhRv...35.1170S. doi:10.1103/physrev.35.1170. ISSN 0031-899X.
- Slack, Francis G.; Breazeale, William M. (1932-10-15). "Magneto-Optic Rotation by Condenser Discharge". Physical Review. 42 (2). American Physical Society (APS): 305–311. Bibcode:1932PhRv...42..305S. doi:10.1103/physrev.42.305. ISSN 0031-899X.
- Slack, Francis G.; Reeves, Ralph L.; Peoples, James A. (1934-10-15). "The Effect of Concentration, Temperature and Wave-Length of Light upon the Verdet Constant of Cerous Chloride Solutions". Physical Review. 46 (8). American Physical Society (APS): 724–727. Bibcode:1934PhRv...46..724S. doi:10.1103/physrev.46.724. ISSN 0031-899X.
- Lageman, R. T.; Slack, F. G. (1936-06-01). "Magneto-Optical Rotation and Natural Dispersion in Gases". Physical Review. 49 (11). American Physical Society (APS): 807–809. Bibcode:1936PhRv...49..807L. doi:10.1103/physrev.49.807. ISSN 0031-899X.
- Slack, Francis G. (1934-12-01). "The Verdet Constant of Heavy Water". Physical Review. 46 (11). American Physical Society (APS): 945–947. Bibcode:1934PhRv...46..945S. doi:10.1103/physrev.46.945. ISSN 0031-899X.
- Anderson, H. L.; Booth, E. T.; Dunning, J. R.; Fermi, E.; Glasoe, G. N.; Slack, F. G. (1939-03-01). "The Fission of Uranium". Physical Review. 55 (5). American Physical Society (APS): 511–512. Bibcode:1939PhRv...55..511A. doi:10.1103/physrev.55.511.2. ISSN 0031-899X.
- Booth, E. T.; Dunning, J. R.; Slack, F. G. (1939-05-01). "Delayed Neutron Emission from Uranium". Physical Review. 55 (9). American Physical Society (APS): 876. Bibcode:1939PhRv...55..876B. doi:10.1103/physrev.55.876. ISSN 0031-899X.
- Booth, E. T.; Dunning, J. R.; Slack, F. G. (1939-05-15). "Energy Distribution of Uranium Fission Fragments". Physical Review. 55 (10). American Physical Society (APS): 981. Bibcode:1939PhRv...55..981B. doi:10.1103/physrev.55.981. ISSN 0031-899X.
- Rudnick, Philip; Slack, F. G.; O'Connor, John (1940-12-01). "Rotatory Power of Nickel Sulphate at Low Temperatures". Physical Review. 58 (11). American Physical Society (APS): 1003. Bibcode:1940PhRv...58.1003R. doi:10.1103/physrev.58.1003. ISSN 0031-899X.
- Forman, G.; Rudnick, P.; Slack, F. G.; Underwood, N. (1949). "A Two-Year Course in Basic Elementary Physics". American Journal of Physics. 17 (1). American Association of Physics Teachers (AAPT): 22–23. Bibcode:1949AmJPh..17...22F. doi:10.1119/1.1989490. ISSN 0002-9505.

== Honors ==
- Francis G. Slack Award – An award of the Southeastern Section of the American Physical Society to honor Excellence in Service to Physics in the Southeast. The award was proposed in 1998 and it was first awarded in 2000.
- Francis G. Slack Lecture Series – An annual lecture series established in 1977 in the Vanderbilt University Department of Physics and Astronomy.

== Bibliography ==
- Bromley, David Allan Francis G. Slack Lectures (Vanderbilt University, department of physics and astronomy, 1979) – Francis G. Lecture delivered by Bromley
- Hamilton, Joseph H., Robert T. Lagemann, and Ernest A. Jones Francis G. Slack: Distinguished Vanderbilt Scientist
