= G. N. Glasoe =

American nuclear physicist

G. Norris Glasoe (29 October 1902 – May 1987) was an American nuclear physicist. He was a member of the Columbia University team which was the first in the United States to verify the European discovery of the nuclear fission of uranium via neutron bombardment. During World War II, he worked at the MIT Radiation Laboratory. He was a physicist and administrator at the Brookhaven National Laboratory.

== Background ==
Gynther Norris Glasoe was born in Northfield, MN to Dr. Paul M. Glasoe and Gena (Kirkwold) Glasoe, both children of Norwegian immigrants. He had two younger brothers: Paul K. Glasoe (1913–2008) and Alf M. Glasoe (1909–2006)

== Education ==
Glasoe completed his undergraduate degree in 1924 at St. Olaf College in Northfield, Minnesota. He received his advanced degrees, including his doctorate, from the University of Wisconsin; a degree was awarded in 1926. After earning his doctorate, Glasoe did research at the University of Wisconsin and then joined the physics faculty at the Columbia University.

== Career ==
John R. Dunning, professor of physics at Columbia, closely followed the work of Ernest Lawrence on the cyclotron. Dunning wanted a more powerful neutron source and the cyclotron appeared as an attractive tool to achieve this end. During 1935 and 1936, he was able to construct a cyclotron using many salvaged parts to reduce costs and funding from industrial and private donations. Glasoe, Dana P. Mitchell, and Hugh Paxton, junior members of the physics faculty at Columbia, worked on the cyclotron part-time. At the suggestion of Mitchell, Dunning offered Herbert L. Anderson a teaching assistant position if he would also help with the design and building of the cyclotron during work on his doctorate in physics, which he did. Others assisting in the construction of the cyclotron were Eugene T. Booth and Hugh Glassford. The cyclotron would in a few years be used by Dunning, Glasoe, and Anderson in a historic experiment based on the discovery of nuclear fission in Europe in December 1938 and January 1939.

In December 1938, the German chemists Otto Hahn and Fritz Strassmann sent a manuscript to Naturwissenschaften reporting they had detected the element barium after bombarding uranium with neutrons; simultaneously, they communicated these results to Lise Meitner. Meitner, and her nephew Otto Robert Frisch, correctly interpreted these results as being nuclear fission. Frisch confirmed this experimentally on 13 January 1939. In 1944, Hahn received the Nobel Prize for Chemistry for the discovery of nuclear fission. Some historians have documented the history of the discovery of nuclear fission and believe Meitner should have been awarded the Nobel Prize with Hahn.

Even before it was published, Meitner's and Frisch's interpretation of the work of Hahn and Strassmann crossed the Atlantic Ocean with Niels Bohr, who was to lecture at Princeton University. Isidor Isaac Rabi and Willis Lamb, two Columbia University physicists working at Princeton, heard the news and carried it back to Columbia. Rabi said he told Fermi; Fermi gave credit to Lamb. Bohr soon thereafter went from Princeton to Columbia to see Fermi. Not finding Fermi in his office, Bohr went down to the cyclotron area and found Anderson. Bohr grabbed him by the shoulder and said: "Young man, let me explain to you about something new and exciting in physics." It was clear to a number of scientists at Columbia that they should try to detect the energy released in the nuclear fission of uranium from neutron bombardment. On 25 January 1939, Glasoe was a member of the experimental team at Columbia University which conducted the first nuclear fission experiment in the United States, which was done in the basement of Pupin Hall; the other members of the team were Herbert L. Anderson, Eugene T. Booth, John R. Dunning, Enrico Fermi, and Francis G. Slack.

During World War II, Glasoe was a staff member and associate group leader at the Radiation Laboratory of the Massachusetts Institute of Technology.

No later than 1948, and as late as 1965, Glasoe was at the Brookhaven National Laboratory (BNL), Upton, Long Island, New York. He was associate chairman of the BNL physics department no later than 1952 and associate director of BNL no later than 1965.

== Honors ==
Glasoe was elected a Fellow of the American Physical Society in 1941. He received the Distinguished Alumnus Award from St. Olaf College in 1965.

== Selected publications ==
=== Articles ===
- Glasoe, G. Norris (1931-10-15). "Contact Potential Difference between Iron and Nickel and their Photoelectric Work Functions". Physical Review. 38 (8). American Physical Society (APS): 1490–1496. Bibcode:1931PhRv...38.1490G. doi:10.1103/physrev.38.1490. ISSN 0031-899X.
- E. Mc Millan, H. L. Anderson, E. T. Booth, J. R. Dunning, E. Fermi, G. N. Glasoe, F. G. Slack Radioactive Recoils from Uranium Activated by Neutrons, Phys. Rev. Volume 55, Number 5, 510-511 (1939).
- Anderson, H. L.; Booth, E. T.; Dunning, J. R.; Fermi, E.; Glasoe, G. N.; Slack, F. G. (1939-03-01). "The Fission of Uranium". Physical Review. 55 (5). American Physical Society (APS): 511–512. Bibcode:1939PhRv...55..511A. doi:10.1103/physrev.55.511.2. ISSN 0031-899X.
- Glasoe, G. N.; Steigman, J. (1939-05-15). "Fission Products from Uranium". Physical Review. 55 (10). American Physical Society (APS): 982–983. Bibcode:1939PhRv...55..982G. doi:10.1103/physrev.55.982.2. ISSN 0031-899X.
- Booth, E. T.; Dunning, J. R.; Glasoe, G. N. (1939-05-15). "Range Distribution of the Uranium Fission Fragments". Physical Review. 55 (10). American Physical Society (APS): 982. Bibcode:1939PhRv...55..982B. doi:10.1103/physrev.55.982. ISSN 0031-899X.
- Glasoe, G. N.; Steigman, J. (1940-07-01). "Radioactive Products from Gases Produced in Uranium Fission". Physical Review. 58 (1). American Physical Society (APS): 1–6. Bibcode:1940PhRv...58....1G. doi:10.1103/physrev.58.1. ISSN 0031-899X.
- G. N. Glasoe, H. Landon, and W. A. McKinley Progress Report for October 1, 1951 to September 30, 1952, Technical Report NYO-869 48 pages, Rensselaer Polytechnic Institute. Subject matter of this report: particle physics.
- Muehlhause, C. O.; Bloom, S. D.; Wegner, H. E.; Glasoe, G. N. (1956-08-01). "Neutron Scattering from Iron and Carbon by Time-of-Flight". Physical Review. 103 (3). American Physical Society (APS): 720–726. Bibcode:1956PhRv..103..720M. doi:10.1103/physrev.103.720. ISSN 0031-899X.
- Landon, H. H.; Elwyn, A. J.; Glasoe, G. N.; Oleksa, S. (1958-11-15). "Neutron Scattering at 2.2 Mev by Time of Flight". Physical Review. 112 (4). American Physical Society (APS): 1192–1200. Bibcode:1958PhRv..112.1192L. doi:10.1103/physrev.112.1192. ISSN 0031-899X.
- Elwyn, A. J.; Landon, H. H.; Oleksa, Sophie; Glasoe, G. N. (1958-11-15). "Study of Some (p, n) Reactions by Neutron Time of Flight". Physical Review. 112 (4). American Physical Society (APS): 1200–1209. Bibcode:1958PhRv..112.1200E. doi:10.1103/physrev.112.1200. ISSN 0031-899X.
- Benjamin, J. A.; Diener, J. J.; Glasoe, G. N.; Larson, J. D.; Minati, K. F.; Rogers, P. C.; Wegner, H. E.; Hyder, H. R. (1971). "Terminal Ion Source System for the Brookhaven Three-Stage Tandem Facility". IEEE Transactions on Nuclear Science. 18 (3). Institute of Electrical and Electronics Engineers (IEEE): 118–122. Bibcode:1971ITNS...18..118B. doi:10.1109/tns.1971.4325977. ISSN 0018-9499.

=== Books ===
- G. N. Glasoe and J. V. Lebacqz (editors) Pulse Generators, MIT Radiation Laboratory Series, Vol. 5 (McGraw-Hill, 1948). Glasoe: Rensselaer Polytechnic Institute. Lebacqz: Johns Hopkins University. Prepared under the supervision of the Office of Scientific Research and Development, National Defense Research Committee.
