= William Howell Pegram =

William Howell Pegram (August 18, 1846 – April 30, 1928) was an American chemist and educator.

== Biography ==
Born Chalk Level, Harnett County, North Carolina, Pegram fought in the American Civil War on the side of the Confederacy. His combat experience and subsequent internment on the Confederacy's defeat left him with a military bearing and, untainted by cynicism, an enthusiasm to be part of the Reconstruction.

After spending the next four years on his father's farm, he entered Trinity College (now Duke University) in 1869 and, even as an undergraduate, assisted in the teaching of science and English literature. Graduating in 1873, by 1874 he was professor of natural science with responsibility for the teaching of physics, chemistry, biology and engineering. It was about this time that he began courting Emma, the daughter of college president Rev. Braxton Craven. As an uncredited report put it:

In 1873 a bright young man, just out of college and full of the fine enthusiasm of youth was appointed to teach the sciences. It did not take him long to doff his coat, roll up his sleeves and resolve to make something happen. This youth was William H. Pegram. The records do not show whether this fine enthusiasm was fundamentally excited by a love of pure science or by a love of the President's daughter. The fact is well-established, however, that through it he won the unqualified approval of the President and also of the President's daughter, and thereby won for himself a career in science.

Pegram married Emma in 1875 and they parented five children, most famously George Braxton Pegram. Tight finances at the college demanded that Pegram was still teaching English until 1879 and it was not until 1900 that he could devote himself to his principle love of chemistry.
