= Eugene T. Booth =

American nuclear physicist (1912–2004)

Eugene Theodore Booth
- Born: September 28, 1912; Rome, Georgia
- Died: March 6, 2004 (aged 91)
- Occupation: Nuclear physicist
- Known for: Making the first demonstration of nuclear fission in the United States, working on gaseous separation of uranium isotopes, directing the construction of a synchrocyclotron
- Scientific career
- Thesis: The production and acceleration of positive ions (1937)
- Doctoral students: Leon M. Lederman

Eugene Theodore Booth, Jr. (28 September 1912 – 6 March 2004) was an American nuclear physicist. He was a member of the historic Columbia University team which made the first demonstration of nuclear fission in the United States. During the Manhattan Project, he worked on gaseous diffusion for isotope separation. He was the director of the design, construction, and operation project for the 385-Mev synchrocyclotron at the Nevis Laboratories, the scientific director of the SCALANT Research Center, and dean of graduate studies at Stevens Institute of Technology. Booth was the scientific director of the SCALANT Research Center, in Italy.

== Education ==
He was born on 28 September 1912 in Rome, Georgia to Reverend Eugene Theodore Booth, Sr. and Lucy Cornelia Gibson.

Booth studied physics at the University of Georgia, where he received his Bachelor of Science (1932) and Master of Science (1934) degrees, followed by a Doctor of Philosophy (1937) at the University of Oxford. In 1934, he was a Rhodes Scholar.

== Career ==
Booth joined Columbia University faculty as a lecturer. He also helped professor John R. Dunning with his cyclotron construction and research. Thus began Booth’s lengthy professional collaboration with Dunning.

In December 1938, the German chemists Otto Hahn and Fritz Strassmann sent a manuscript to Naturwissenschaften reporting they had detected the element barium after bombarding uranium with neutrons; simultaneously, they communicated these results to Lise Meitner. Meitner, and her nephew Otto Robert Frisch, correctly interpreted these results as being nuclear fission. Frisch confirmed this experimentally on 13 January 1939. In 1944, Hahn received the Nobel Prize for Chemistry for the discovery of nuclear fission. Some historians have documented the history of the discovery of nuclear fission and believe Meitner should have been awarded the Nobel Prize with Hahn.

Even before it was published, Meitner’s and Frisch’s interpretation of the work of Hahn and Strassmann crossed the Atlantic Ocean with Niels Bohr, who was to lecture at Princeton University. Isidor Isaac Rabi and Willis Lamb, two Columbia University physicists working at Princeton, heard the news and carried it back to Columbia. Rabi said he told Fermi; Fermi gave credit to Lamb. It was soon clear to a number of scientists at Columbia that they should try to detect the energy released in the nuclear fission of uranium from neutron bombardment. On 25 January 1939, Booth was a member of the experimental team at Columbia University which conducted the first nuclear fission experiment in the United States, which was done in the basement of Pupin Hall; the other members of the team were Herbert L. Anderson, John R. Dunning, Enrico Fermi, G. Norris Glasoe, and Francis G. Slack.

During World War II, Booth was a member of Columbia’s scientific staff in the Division of War Research. During the Manhattan Project, Dunning conducted pioneering work at Columbia University on gaseous diffusion to separate uranium isotopes; others working on the project included Booth, Henry A. Boorse, Willard F. Libby, Alfred O. C. Nier, and Francis G. Slack.

After World War II, Booth was director of the project for the design, construction, and operation of a 385-MeV Synchrocyclotron at the Nevis Laboratories in Irvington-on-the-Hudson. The project was a collaborative effort of Columbia University, the United States Atomic Energy Commission, and the Office of Naval Research.

He died on 6 March 2004 in Briarcliff Manor, New York.

== Legacy ==
A middle school in Woodstock, Georgia named after his father E.T. Booth was opened at 6550 Putnam Ford Drive, in Woodstock, his hometown.

== Honors ==
- 1941 — Fellow of the American Physical Society
- Citation from the United States Atomic Energy Commission for his accomplishments in nuclear physics.

== Selected publications ==
- Booth, E. T.; Hurst, C. (1936). "Scattering of Neutrons by Protons". Nature. 138 (3502): 1011. Bibcode:1936Natur.138.1011B. doi:10.1038/1381011a0. S2CID 4069360.
- Booth, E. T.; Hurst, C. (1937-07-15). "Experiments with iso-energetic neutrons". Proceedings of the Royal Society of London. Series A, Mathematical and Physical Sciences. 161 (905): 248–260. Bibcode:1937RSPSA.161..248B. doi:10.1098/rspa.1937.0144.
- Anderson, H. L.; Booth, E. T.; Dunning, J. R.; Fermi, E.; Glasoe, G. N.; Slack, F. G. (1939-03-01). "The Fission of Uranium". Physical Review. 55 (5): 511–512. Bibcode:1939PhRv...55..511A. doi:10.1103/physrev.55.511.2.
- Booth, E. T.; Dunning, J. R.; Slack, F. G. (1939-05-01). "Delayed Neutron Emission from Uranium". Physical Review. 55 (9): 876. Bibcode:1939PhRv...55..876B. doi:10.1103/physrev.55.876.
- Booth, E. T.; Dunning, J. R.; Slack, F. G. (1939-05-15). "Energy Distribution of Uranium Fission Fragments". Physical Review. 55 (10): 981. Bibcode:1939PhRv...55..981B. doi:10.1103/physrev.55.981.
- Booth, E. T.; Dunning, J. R.; Glasoe, G. N. (1939-05-15). "Range Distribution of the Uranium Fission Fragments". Physical Review. 55 (10): 982. Bibcode:1939PhRv...55..982B. doi:10.1103/physrev.55.982.
- Nier, Alfred O.; Booth, E. T.; Dunning, J. R.; Grosse, A. V. (1940-03-15). "Nuclear Fission of Separated Uranium Isotopes". Physical Review. 57 (6): 546. Bibcode:1940PhRv...57..546N. doi:10.1103/physrev.57.546. S2CID 4106096.
- Nier, A. O.; Booth, E. T.; Dunning, J. R.; Grosse, A. V. (1940-04-15). "Further Experiments on Fission of Separated Uranium Isotopes". Physical Review. 57 (8): 748. Bibcode:1940PhRv...57..748N. doi:10.1103/physrev.57.748.
- Booth, E. T.; Dunning, J. R.; Grosse, A. V.; Nier, A. O. (1940-09-01). "Neutron Capture by Uranium (238)". Physical Review. 58 (5): 475–476. Bibcode:1940PhRv...58..475B. doi:10.1103/physrev.58.475.2.
- Grosse, A. V.; Booth, E. T.; Dunning, J. R. (1941-02-01). "The Fourth (4n+1) Radioactive Series". Physical Review. 59 (3): 322–323. Bibcode:1941PhRv...59..322G. doi:10.1103/physrev.59.322.2.
- E. T. Booth, M. W. Johnson, R. W. Schubert, H. C. Beck, W. E. Hovemeyer, W. F. Goodell, Jr. Cyclotron Report: 1950 - 1951, Report Number NP-3045, 52 pages (1950). Institutional citation: Nevis Cyclotron Labs., Columbia University.
