= John R. Dunning =

American physicist (1907-1975)

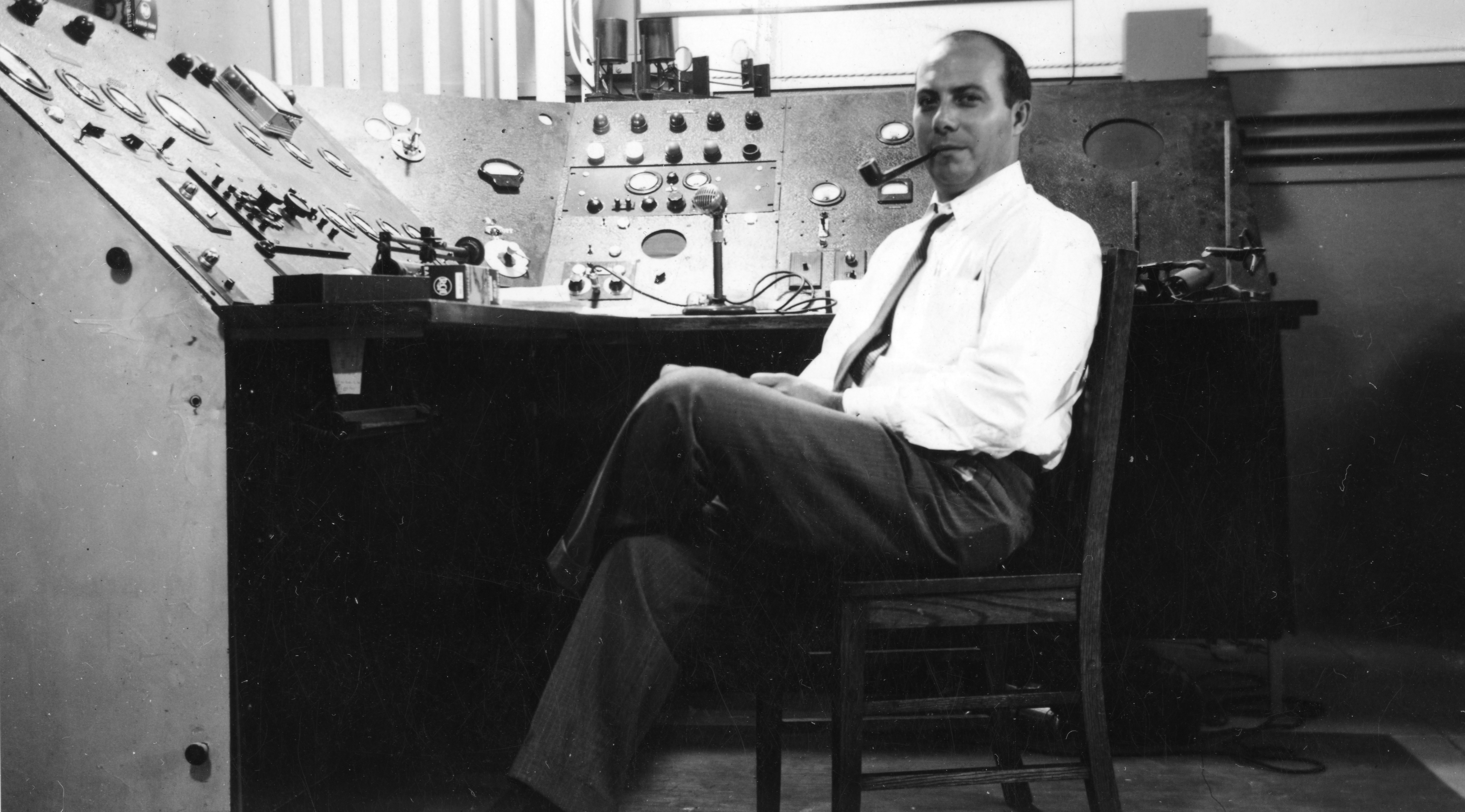
- Dunning in c. 1940
- Born: September 24, 1907; Shelby, Nebraska, US
- Died: August 25, 1975 (aged 67); Key Biscayne, Florida, US
- Education: Nebraska Wesleyan University (BA); Columbia University (MS, PhD)
- Awards: Medal for Merit (1946)
- Scientific career
- Fields: physics
- Thesis: The Emission and Scattering of Neutrons (1934)
- Doctoral advisor: George B. Pegram

John Ray Dunning (September 24, 1907 – August 25, 1975) was an American physicist who played key roles in the Manhattan Project that developed the first atomic bombs. He specialized in neutron physics, and did pioneering work in gaseous diffusion for isotope separation. He was dean of the school of engineering and applied science at Columbia University from 1950 to 1969.

== Early life ==
John Ray Dunning was born in Shelby, Nebraska, on September 24, 1907, the son of Albert Chester Dunning, a grain dealer, and his wife Josephine Dunning née Thelen. He graduated from Shelby High School in 1925, and entered Nebraska Wesleyan University where he became a member of Phi Kappa Tau fraternity, and received a Bachelor of Arts (B.A.) degree in 1929.

After graduation, Dunning commenced a doctoral program at Columbia University. In 1932, James Chadwick discovered the neutron, which influenced Dunning's career, as he thereafter devoted much of his professional interest to the characteristics and uses of this particle. Dunning's research was enthusiastically supported at Columbia by George B. Pegram. In 1933, Dunning was an instructor at Columbia University from 1929 to 1932, and a university fellow from 1932 to 1933. He received his Ph.D. in 1934, writing his thesis on "The Emission and Scattering of Neutrons" under Pegram's supervision.

Dunning married Esther Laura Blevins in 1930. They had two children, John Ray Jr., who became a professor of physics and astronomy at Sonoma State University, and Ann Adele.

== Manhattan Project ==
After gaining his doctorate at Columbia, Dunning continued teaching and research there, becoming an assistant professor in 1935, and an associate professor there in 1938. Dunning was a central figure at Columbia on neutron research, and went on to publish 24 papers on neutrons between 1934 and 1938. In 1936, Dunning received a Traveling Fellowship, which he used to meet and discuss his neutron physics research with many eminent European nuclear physicists including Niels Bohr, James Chadwick, Fermi, Werner Heisenberg, and Ernest Rutherford.

Dunning closely followed the work of Ernest Lawrence on the cyclotron. Dunning wanted a more powerful neutron source and the cyclotron appeared as an attractive tool to achieve this end. Government funding was not available for such projects in those days, and university budgets were tight. Nonetheless, during 1935 and 1936 he was able construct a cyclotron using many salvaged parts to reduce costs and funding from industrial and private donations. It was announced in 2007 that Columbia University has decided to junk a 70-year-old atom smasher, which is the nation's oldest artefact of the nuclear era. After being decommissioned in 1965, the machine sat in the basement of Pupin Hall, home of Columbia's physics department. It was scrapped in 2008, although some components are in the Smithsonian Institution in Washington, DC.

The cyclotron built by Dunning in 1939, in the Pupin Hall physics building basement at Columbia University. Dunning (left) is with Enrico Fermi (center) and Dana P. Mitchell (right)

In December 1938, the German chemists Otto Hahn and Fritz Strassmann sent a manuscript to Naturwissenschaften reporting they had detected the element barium after bombarding uranium with neutrons. They communicated these results to Lise Meitner, who, with her nephew Otto Frisch, correctly interpreted these results as being the result of nuclear fission. Frisch then confirmed this experimentally on January 13, 1939. Even before it was published, Meitner’s and Frisch’s interpretation of the work of Hahn and Strassmann crossed the Atlantic Ocean with Niels Bohr, who was to lecture at Princeton University. Isidor Isaac Rabi and Willis Lamb, two Columbia University physicists working at Princeton, heard the news and carried it back to Columbia. Rabi said he told Fermi; Fermi gave credit to Lamb. It was soon clear to a number of scientists at Columbia that they should try to detect the energy released in the nuclear fission of uranium from neutron bombardment. On 25 January 1939, Dunning was a member of the Columbia team that conducted the first nuclear fission experiment in the United States. in the Other members of the team were Herbert L. Anderson, Eugene T. Booth, Enrico Fermi, G. Norris Glasoe, and Francis G. Slack.

Bohr argued that it was the uranium-235 isotope that was responsible for fission. Dunning realised that if this was the case, then an atomic bomb would be possible. His thoughts turned to devising a process for uranium enrichment, and by 1940 he was investigating gaseous diffusion, which he felt appeared to be more effective than the electromagnetic method of Alfred Nier and offered the best route to enrichment on an industrial scale. The researchers at Columbia became the Manhattan Project's Substitute Alloy Materials (SAM) Laboratories. Dunning headed the laboratory division responsible for all aspects of the gaseous diffusion program, including engineering problems, pilot plants and research activities. Four papers co-written with James Rainwater, William W. Havens Jr., and Chien-Shiung Wu appeared in 1947 and 1948, but much remained classified. Due to the secrecy of this work, Dunning and three of his colleagues were awarded $300,000 each in lieu of patent royalties. For his part, Dunning was awarded the Medal for Merit by President Harry S. Truman. His citation read:

for exceptionally meritorious conduct in the performance of outstanding service to the War Department, in accomplishments involving great responsibility and scientific distinction in connection with the development of the greatest military weapon of all time, the atomic bomb. As a physical researcher, he took a leading part in the initiation of the early phases of the project; then he was in charge of essential research in the SAM Laboratories for the Manhattan Engineer District, Army Service Forces, and then he served as advisor to the contractor for full scale operation of his process. A physicist of national distinction, Dr. Dunning's unselfish and unswerving devotion to duty have contributed significantly to the success of the Atomic Bomb project.

== Later life ==
John R. Dunning (left) and Hubert Thelen (right) – first cousins, March 1957 after funeral of John's father A.C. Dunning

In 1946, Dunning became Thayer Lindsley Professor of Applied Science at Columbia. In the immediate post-war years he was scientific director for construction of the Nevis Laboratories, a collaborative effort of Columbia University, the United States Atomic Energy Commission, and the Office of Naval Research. He became dean of the school of engineering and applied science in 1950. This ended his active research career, but he was active in fundraising for what became the Seeley Wintersmith Mudd Building and the Terrace Engineering Center extension. By the time he stepped down as dean in 1969, he had raised $50 million for the school.

During the 1950s, Dunning was often consulted on nuclear technology matters by President Dwight D. Eisenhower and Rear Admiral Hyman G. Rickover, the head of the Navy's nuclear powered ships project. Dunning was elected to the United States National Academy of Sciences in 1948, and the Phi Kappa Tau Hall of Fame. Over the years he served as chairman of the New York City Board of Education Advisory Committee on Science Manpower, the President's Committee on Supersonic Transport and the Science Advisory Council to the Legislature of the State of New York. He was a member of the board of the American Association for the Advancement of Science and the science advisory committee of the Department of Defense.

Fascinated by nuclear technology and eager to share his knowledge with the public, Dunning gave numerous public talks on the subject, and made frequent appearances on television and radio. He helped write a Blondie and Dagwood comic that explained nuclear energy in simple terms. In one experiment, he drank irradiated salt water, and used a geiger counter to demonstrate to his audience how his fingers became radioactive as sodium-24, with its half life of 15 hours, circulated through his bloodstream.

He died from a heart attack at his home in Key Biscayne, Florida, on August 25, 1975, and was buried at North Cemetery in Sherman, Connecticut, near where he had another home.

== Selected publications ==
- John R. Dunning The Emission and Scattering of Neutrons, Phys. Rev. Volume 45, Issue 9, 586–600 (1934). Institutional citation: Department of Physics, Columbia University. Received 5 March 1934.
- H. L. Anderson, E. T. Booth, J. R. Dunning, E. Fermi, G. N. Glasoe, and F. G. Slack The Fission of Uranium, Phys. Rev. Volume 55, Number 5, 511–512 (1939). Institutional citation: Pupin Physics Laboratories, Columbia University, New York, New York. Received 16 February 1939.
- E. T. Booth, J. R. Dunning, and F. G. Slack Delayed Neutron Emission from Uranium, Phys. Rev. Volume 55, Number 9, 876–876 (1939). Institutional citation: Department of Physics, Columbia University, New York, New York. Received 17 April 1939.
- E. T. Booth, J. R. Dunning, and F. G. Slack Energy Distribution of Uranium Fission Fragments, Phys. Rev. Volume 55, Number 10, 981–981 (1939). Institutional citation: Pupin Physics Laboratories, Columbia University, New York, New York. Received 1 May 1939.
- E. T. Booth, J. R. Dunning, and G. N. Glasoe Range Distribution of the Uranium Fission Fragments, Phys. Rev. Volume 55, Issue 10, 982–982 (1939). Institutional citation: Pupin Physics Laboratories, Columbia University, New York, New York. Received 1 May 1939.
- A. O. Nier, E. T. Booth, J. R. Dunning, and A. V. Grosse Nuclear fission of separated uranium isotopes, Phys. Rev. Volume 57, Issue 6, 546–546 (1940). Received 3 March 1940. Booth, Dunning, and Grosse were identified as being at Columbia University, New York, New York. Nier was identified as being at the University of Minnesota, Minneapolis, Minnesota.
- A. O. Nier, E. T. Booth, J. R. Dunning, and A. V. Grosse Further experiments on fission of separated uranium isotopes, Phys. Rev. Volume 57, Issue 8, 748–748 (1940). Received 13 April 1940. Booth, Dunning, and Grosse were identified as being at Columbia University, New York, New York. Nier was identified as being at the University of Minnesota, Minneapolis, Minnesota.
- E. T. Booth, J. R. Dunning, A. V. Grosse, and A. O. Nier Neutron Capture by Uranium (238), Phys. Rev. Volume 58, Issue 5, 475–476 (1940). Received 13 August 1940. Booth, Dunning, and Grosse were identified as being at Columbia University, New York, New York. Nier was identified as being at the University of Minnesota, Minneapolis, Minnesota.
- A. V. Grosse, E. T. Booth, and J. R. Dunning The Fourth (4n+1) Radioactive Series, Phys. Rev. Volume 59, Issue 3, 322–323 (1941). Institutional citation: Pupin Physics Laboratories, Columbia University, New York, New York. Received 11 January 1941.

== Bibliography ==
- John R. Dunning Matter, Energy and Radiation (Columbia College Natural Science Series) (McGraw Hill, 1941)
- John R. Dunning and Bruce R. Prentics (editors) Hot Laboratory Operation and Equipment, Volume III. Fifth Hot Laboratories and Equipment Conference (Symposium Publications Division Pergamon Press, 1957)
- John R. Dunning and Bruce R. Prentics (editors) Advances in Nuclear Engineering, Volume I. Proceedings of the Second Nuclear Engineering and Science Conference (Pergamon Press 1957)
- John R. Dunning and Bruce R. Prentics (editors) Advances in Nuclear Engineering, Volume II. Proceedings of the Second Nuclear Engineering & Science Congress (Pergamon Press 1957)
