= Eger V. Murphree =

American chemist (1898–1962)

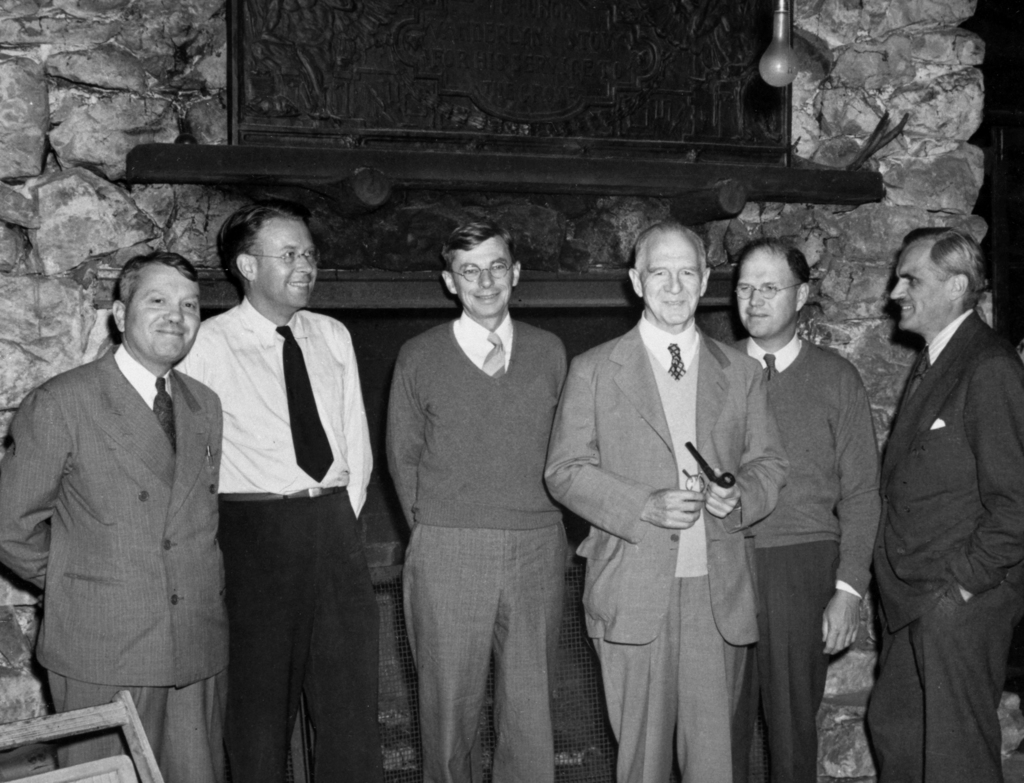
S-1 Executive Committee at the Bohemian Grove, September 13, 1942. From left to right are Harold C. Urey, Ernest O. Lawrence, James B. Conant, Lyman J. Briggs, E. V. Murphree and Arthur Compton

Eger Vaughan Murphree (November 3, 1898 – October 29, 1962) was an American chemist, best known for his co-invention of the process of fluid catalytic cracking.

== Biography ==
Murphree was born on November 3, 1898, in Bayonne, New Jersey, moving as a child to Kentucky. He graduated from Kentucky University with degrees in chemistry and mathematics in 1920, and a master's degree in chemistry in 1921. Murphree played college football as Kentucky as a tackle and was captain of the 1920 Kentucky Wildcats football team.

After teaching physics and math and coaching football for a year at Paris High School in Paris, Illinois, Murphree spent several years at the Massachusetts Institute of Technology as a staff assistant and research associate in the Chemical Engineering Department. In 1930, he joined what was then Standard Oil of New Jersey.

During the Second World War Murphree was a member of the committee that organized the Manhattan Project and was widely recognized as a leader in the fields of synthetic toluene, butadiene and hydrocarbon synthesis, fluid cat cracking, fluid hydroforming, and fluid coking.

He was also involved in the early Manhattan Project as a member of the S-1 Section. Murphree was head of the centrifuge project (soon abandoned) and overall engineer for the Manhattan Project in June 1942. He struck Deputy District Engineer Kenneth Nichols as "more like the industrial engineers I was accustomed to dealing with. He was stable, conservative, thorough and precise". He was to have been on the Lewis Committee reviewing the entire project in November 1942, but was sick. He (and James Conant) disagreed with the committee recommendation to build only a small electromagnetic plant, and a full-size plant was built. In the 1950s he served in the Defense Department on scheduling missiles and coordinating the programs of the three services (as Nichols had done earlier).

From 1947 to 1962 he served as Vice President of research and engineering Standard Oil of New Jersey, the company later known as Exxon.

Among his awards were the Perkin Medal in 1950 and the Industrial Research Institute (IRI) Medal in 1953. The E. V. Murphree Award in Industrial and Engineering Chemistry awarded annually by the American Chemical Society is named in his honor.

Murphree died on October 29, 1962, at Overlook Hospital in Summit, New Jersey of coronary thrombosis.

== Legacy ==
Murphree was inducted into the National Inventors Hall of Fame in 1999.
