= William Hallock =

American physicist

Hallock in 1886

William Hallock, Ph. D., D.Pharm. (1857–1913) was an American physicist, born at Milton, New York. He graduated from Columbia College in 1879, and received the degree of Ph.D. from Würzburg, German Empire in 1881.

He served as professor of chemistry and toxicology at the National College of Pharmacy in 1889–92, and as physicist of the United States Geological Survey from 1882 to 1891, then returned to Columbia as adjunct professor of physics in 1892.

He became full professor in 1902 and was dean of the faculty of pure science (1906–09).

Professor Hallock wrote Outlines of the Evolution of Weights and Measures and the Metric System (1906).

Hallock was elected to the American Philosophical Society in 1908.
