= Nuclear fission =

Reaction that splits an atomic nucleus

Induced fission reaction. A neutron is absorbed by a uranium-235 nucleus, turning it briefly into an excited uranium-236 nucleus, with the excitation energy provided by the kinetic energy of the neutron plus the forces that bind the neutron. The uranium-236, in turn, splits into fast-moving lighter elements (fission products) which have a very large amount of kinetic energy, and also releases several free neutrons, and one or more "prompt gamma rays" (not shown).

Nuclear fission is a reaction in which the nucleus of an atom splits into two or more smaller nuclei. The fission process often produces neutrons and gamma rays, and releases a very large amount of energy even by the energetic standards of radioactive decay. The free energy released by the fission of one uranium-235 atom is about 100 million times the energy released by burning one carbon atom in air to produce CO_{2}.

Nuclear fission was discovered by chemists Otto Hahn and Fritz Strassmann and physicists Lise Meitner and Otto Robert Frisch. Hahn and Strassmann proved that a fission reaction had taken place on 19 December 1938, and Meitner and her nephew Frisch explained it theoretically in January 1939. Frisch named the process "fission" by analogy with biological fission of living cells. In their second publication on nuclear fission in February 1939, Hahn and Strassmann predicted the existence and liberation of additional neutrons during the fission process, opening up the possibility of a nuclear chain reaction by assembling a critical mass of fissile material.

For heavy nuclides, it is an exothermic reaction which releases large amounts of energy both as electromagnetic radiation and as kinetic energy of the fragments (heating the bulk material where fission takes place). Like nuclear fusion, for fission to produce energy, the total binding energy of the resulting elements must be greater than that of the starting element. The fission barrier must also be overcome. Fissionable nuclides primarily split in interactions with fast neutrons, while fissile nuclides easily split in interactions with "slow" i.e. thermal neutrons, usually originating from moderation of fast neutrons. The ability of three isotopes (U-233, U-235, and Pu-239) to sustain a nuclear chain reaction allows nuclear power plants to operate in a delayed critical state for a controllable energy release, and also for nuclear weapons to operate at a prompt supercritical state for an uncontrolled energy release occurring in about a microsecond.

Fission is a form of nuclear transmutation because the resulting fragments (or daughter atoms) are not the same element as the original parent atom. The two (or more) nuclei produced are most often of comparable but slightly different sizes, typically with a mass ratio of products of about 3 to 2, for common fissile isotopes. Most fissions are binary fissions (producing two charged fragments), but occasionally (2 to 4 times per 1000 events), three positively charged fragments are produced, in a ternary fission. The smallest of these fragments in ternary processes ranges in size from a proton to an argon nucleus. The unpredictable composition of the products (which vary in a broad probabilistic and somewhat chaotic manner) distinguishes fission from purely quantum tunneling processes such as proton emission, alpha decay, and cluster decay, which give the same products each time.

Spontaneous fission, discovered in 1940 by Georgy Flyorov, Konstantin Petrzhak, and Igor Kurchatov, is fission not induced by an exogenous neutron, but rather a spontaneous radioactive decay occurring because the nucleus is already unstable from an overabundance of neutrons, and occurs in very high-mass-number isotopes. In contrast to nuclear fusion, which powers stars and has created all the elements of the universe, (see iron peak) one can consider nuclear fission as negligible for the evolution of the universe. Nonetheless, natural nuclear fission reactors have formed under very rare conditions.

== Physical overview ==
=== Mechanism ===
Younes and Loveland define fission as, "...a collective motion of the protons and neutrons that make up the nucleus, and as such it is distinguishable from other phenomena that break up the nucleus. Nuclear fission is an extreme example of large-amplitude collective motion that results in the division of a parent nucleus into two or more fragment nuclei. The fission process can occur spontaneously, or it can be induced by an incident particle." The energy from a fission reaction is produced by its fission products, though a large majority of it, about 85 percent, is found in fragment kinetic energy, while about 6 percent each comes from initial neutrons and gamma rays and those emitted after beta decay, plus about 3 percent from neutrinos as the product of such decay.

A visual representation of an induced nuclear fission event where a slow-moving neutron is absorbed by the nucleus of a uranium-235 atom, which fissions into two fast-moving lighter elements (fission products) and additional neutrons. Most of the energy released is in the form of the kinetic velocities of the fission products and the neutrons.

Fission product yields by mass for thermal neutron fission of uranium-235, plutonium-239, a combination of the two typical of current nuclear power reactors, and uranium-233, used in the thorium cycle

==== Radioactive decay ====
Nuclear fission can occur without neutron bombardment as a type of radioactive decay. This type of fission is called spontaneous fission, and was first observed in 1940.

==== Nuclear reaction ====
During induced fission, a compound system is formed after an incident particle fuses with a target. The resultant excitation energy may be sufficient to emit neutrons, or gamma-rays, and nuclear scission. Fission into two fragments is called binary fission, and is the most common nuclear reaction. Occurring least frequently is ternary fission, in which a third particle is emitted. This third particle is commonly an α particle. Since in nuclear fission, the nucleus emits more neutrons than the one it absorbs, a chain reaction is possible.

Binary fission may produce any of the fission products, at 95±15 and 135±15 daltons. One example of a binary fission event in the most commonly used fissile nuclide, ^{235}U, is given as:

$\ {}^{235}\mathrm{U} + \mathrm{n} \longrightarrow {}^{236}\mathrm{U}^{*} \longrightarrow {}^{95}\mathrm{Sr} + {}^{139}\mathrm{Xe} + 2\ \mathrm{n} + 180\ \mathrm{MeV}$

However, the binary process happens merely because it is the most probable. In anywhere from two to four fissions per 1000 in a nuclear reactor, ternary fission can produce three positively charged fragments (plus neutrons) and the smallest of these may range from so small a charge and mass as a proton (Z = 1), to as large a fragment as argon (Z = 18). The most common small fragments, however, are composed of 90% helium-4 nuclei with more energy than alpha particles from alpha decay (so-called "long range alphas" at ~16 megaelectronvolts (MeV)), plus helium-6 nuclei, and tritons (the nuclei of tritium). Though less common than binary fission, it still produces significant helium-4 and tritium gas buildup in the fuel rods of modern nuclear reactors.

Bohr and Wheeler used their liquid drop model, the packing fraction curve of Arthur Jeffrey Dempster, and Eugene Feenberg's estimates of nucleus radius and surface tension, to estimate the mass differences of parent and daughters in fission. They then equated this mass difference to energy using Einstein's mass-energy equivalence formula. The stimulation of the nucleus after neutron bombardment was analogous to the vibrations of a liquid drop, with surface tension and the Coulomb force in opposition. Plotting the sum of these two energies as a function of elongated shape, they determined the resultant energy surface had a saddle shape. The saddle provided an energy barrier called the critical energy barrier. Energy of about 6 MeV provided by the incident neutron was necessary to overcome this barrier and cause the nucleus to fission. According to John Lilley, "The energy required to overcome the barrier to fission is called the activation energy or fission barrier and is about 6 MeV for A ≈ 240. It is found that the activation energy decreases as A increases. Eventually, a point is reached where activation energy disappears altogether...it would undergo very rapid spontaneous fission."

Maria Goeppert Mayer later proposed the nuclear shell model for the nucleus. The nuclides that can sustain a fission chain reaction are suitable for use as nuclear fuels. The most common nuclear fuels are ^{235}U (the isotope of uranium with mass number 235 and of use in nuclear reactors) and ^{239}Pu (the isotope of plutonium with mass number 239). These fuels break apart into a bimodal range of chemical elements with atomic masses centering near 95 and 135 daltons (fission products). Most nuclear fuels undergo spontaneous fission only very slowly, decaying instead mainly via an alpha-beta decay chain over periods of millennia to eons. In a nuclear reactor or nuclear weapon, the overwhelming majority of fission events are induced by bombardment with another particle, a neutron, which is itself produced by prior fission events.

Fissionable isotopes such as uranium-238 require additional energy provided by fast neutrons (such as those produced by nuclear fusion in thermonuclear weapons). While some of the neutrons released from the fission of ^{238}U are fast enough to induce another fission in ^{238}U, most are not, meaning it can never achieve criticality. While there is a very small (albeit nonzero) chance of a thermal neutron inducing fission in ^{238}U, neutron absorption is orders of magnitude more likely.

=== Energetics ===
==== Input ====
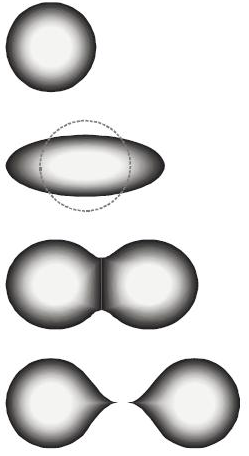
The stages of binary fission in a liquid drop model. Energy input deforms the nucleus into a fat "cigar" shape, then a "peanut" shape, followed by binary fission as the two lobes exceed the short-range nuclear force attraction distance, and are then pushed apart and away by their electrical charge. In the liquid drop model, the two fission fragments are predicted to be the same size. The nuclear shell model allows for them to differ in size, as usually experimentally observed.

Fission cross sections are a measurable property related to the probability that fission will occur in a nuclear reaction. Cross sections are a function of incident neutron energy, and those for ^{235}U and ^{239}Pu are a million times higher than ^{238}U at lower neutron energy levels. Absorption of any neutron makes available to the nucleus binding energy of about 5.3 MeV. ^{238}U needs a fast neutron to supply the additional 1 MeV needed to cross the critical energy barrier for fission. In the case of ^{235}U however, that extra energy is provided when ^{235}U adjusts from an odd to an even mass. In the words of Younes and Lovelace, "...the neutron absorption on a ^{235}U target forms a ^{236}U nucleus with excitation energy greater than the critical fission energy, whereas in the case of n + ^{238}U, the resulting ^{239}U nucleus has an excitation energy below the critical fission energy."

About 6 MeV of the fission-input energy is supplied by the simple binding of an extra neutron to the heavy nucleus via the strong force; however, in many fissionable isotopes, this amount of energy is not enough for fission. Uranium-238, for example, has a near-zero fission cross section for neutrons of less than 1 MeV energy. If no additional energy is supplied by any other mechanism, the nucleus will not fission, but will merely absorb the neutron, as happens when ^{238}U absorbs slow and even some fraction of fast neutrons, to become ^{239}U. The remaining energy to initiate fission can be supplied by two other mechanisms: one of these is more kinetic energy of the incoming neutron, which is increasingly able to fission a fissionable heavy nucleus as it exceeds a kinetic energy of 1 MeV or more (so-called fast neutrons). Such high energy neutrons are able to fission ^{238}U directly (see thermonuclear weapon for application, where the fast neutrons are supplied by nuclear fusion). However, this process cannot happen to a great extent in a nuclear reactor, as too small a fraction of the fission neutrons produced by any type of fission have enough energy to efficiently fission ^{238}U. (For example, neutrons from thermal fission of ^{235}U have a mean energy of 2 MeV, a median energy of 1.6 MeV, and a mode of 0.75 MeV, and the energy spectrum for fast fission is similar.)

Among the heavy actinide elements, however, those isotopes that have an odd number of neutrons (such as ^{235}U with 143 neutrons) bind an extra neutron with an additional 1 to 2 MeV of energy over an isotope of the same element with an even number of neutrons (such as ^{238}U with 146 neutrons). This extra binding energy is made available as a result of the mechanism of neutron pairing effects, which itself is caused by the Pauli exclusion principle, allowing an extra neutron to occupy the same nuclear orbital as the last neutron in the nucleus. In such isotopes, therefore, no neutron kinetic energy is needed, for all the necessary energy is supplied by absorption of any neutron, either of the slow or fast variety (the former are used in moderated nuclear reactors, and the latter are used in fast-neutron reactors, and in weapons).

According to Younes and Loveland, "Actinides like ^{235}U that fission easily following the absorption of a thermal (25 meV) neutron are called fissile, whereas those like ^{238}U that do not easily fission when they absorb a thermal neutron are called fissionable."

==== Output ====
After an incident particle has fused with a parent nucleus, if the excitation energy is sufficient, the nucleus breaks into fragments. This is called scission, and occurs at about 10^{−20} seconds. The fragments can emit prompt neutrons at between 10^{−18} and 10^{−15} seconds. At about 10^{−11} seconds, the fragments can emit gamma rays. At 10^{−3} seconds β decay, β-delayed neutrons, and gamma rays are emitted from the decay products.

Typical fission events release about two hundred million eV (200 MeV) of energy for each fission event. The exact isotope which is fissioned, and whether or not it is fissionable or fissile, has only a small impact on the amount of energy released. This can be easily seen by examining the curve of binding energy (image below), and noting that the average binding energy of the actinide nuclides beginning with uranium is around 7.6 MeV per nucleon. Looking further left on the curve of binding energy, where the fission products cluster, it is easily observed that the binding energy of the fission products tends to center around 8.5 MeV per nucleon. Thus, in any fission event of an isotope in the actinide mass range, roughly 0.9 MeV are released per nucleon of the starting element. The fission of ^{235}U by a slow neutron yields nearly identical energy to the fission of ^{238}U by a fast neutron. This energy release profile holds for thorium and the various minor actinides as well.

Animation of a Coulomb explosion in the case of a cluster of positively charged nuclei, akin to a cluster of fission fragments. Hue level of color is proportional to (larger) nuclei charge. Electrons (smaller) on this time-scale are seen only stroboscopically and the hue level is their kinetic energy.

When a uranium nucleus fissions into two daughter nuclei fragments, about 0.1 percent of the mass of the uranium nucleus appears as the fission energy of ~200 MeV. For uranium-235 (total mean fission energy 202.79 MeV), typically ~169 MeV appears as the kinetic energy of the daughter nuclei, which fly apart at about 3% of the speed of light, due to Coulomb repulsion. Also, an average of 2.5 neutrons are emitted, with a mean kinetic energy per neutron of ~2 MeV (total of 4.8 MeV). The fission reaction also releases ~7 MeV in prompt gamma ray photons. The latter figure means that a nuclear fission explosion or criticality accident emits about 3.5% of its energy as gamma rays, less than 2.5% of its energy as fast neutrons (total of both types of radiation ~6%), and the rest as kinetic energy of fission fragments (this appears almost immediately when the fragments impact surrounding matter, as simple heat).

Some processes involving neutrons are notable for absorbing or finally yielding energy — for example neutron kinetic energy does not yield heat immediately if the neutron is captured by a uranium-238 atom to breed plutonium-239, but this energy is emitted if the plutonium-239 is later fissioned. On the other hand, so-called delayed neutrons emitted as radioactive decay products with half-lives up to several minutes, from fission-daughters, are very important to reactor control, because they give a characteristic "reaction" time for the total nuclear reaction to double in size, if the reaction is run in a "delayed-critical" zone which deliberately relies on these neutrons for a supercritical chain-reaction (one in which each fission cycle yields more neutrons than it absorbs). Without their existence, the nuclear chain-reaction would be prompt critical and increase in size faster than it could be controlled by human intervention. In this case, the first experimental atomic reactors would have run away to a dangerous and messy "prompt critical reaction" before their operators could have manually shut them down (for this reason, designer Enrico Fermi included radiation-counter-triggered control rods, suspended by electromagnets, which could automatically drop into the center of Chicago Pile-1). If these delayed neutrons are captured without producing fissions, they produce heat as well.

=== Binding energy ===
The "curve of binding energy": A graph of binding energy per nucleon of common isotopes.

The binding energy of the nucleus is the difference between the rest-mass energy of the nucleus and the rest-mass energy of the neutron and proton nucleons. The binding energy formula includes volume, surface and Coulomb energy terms that include empirically derived coefficients for all three, plus energy ratios of a deformed nucleus relative to a spherical form for the surface and Coulomb terms. Additional terms can be included such as symmetry, pairing, the finite range of the nuclear force, and charge distribution within the nuclei to improve the estimate. Normally binding energy is referred to and plotted as average binding energy per nucleon.

According to Lilley, "The binding energy of a nucleus B is the energy required to separate it into its constituent neutrons and protons."
$$m(\mathbf{A},\mathbf{Z}) = \mathbf{Z}m_H + \mathbf{N}m_n - \mathbf{B}/c^2$$
where A is mass number, Z is atomic number, m_{H} is the atomic mass of a hydrogen atom, m_{n} is the mass of a neutron, and c is the speed of light. Thus, the mass of an atom is less than the mass of its constituent protons and neutrons, assuming the average binding energy of its electrons is negligible. The binding energy B is expressed in energy units, using Einstein's mass-energy equivalence relationship. The binding energy also provides an estimate of the total energy released from fission.

The curve of binding energy is characterized by a broad maximum near mass number 60 at 8.6 MeV, then gradually decreases to 7.6 MeV at the highest mass numbers. Mass numbers higher than 238 are rare. At the lighter end of the scale, peaks are noted for helium-4, and the multiples such as beryllium-8, carbon-12, oxygen-16, neon-20 and magnesium-24. Binding energy due to the nuclear force approaches a constant value for large A, while the Coulomb acts over a larger distance so that electrical potential energy per proton grows as Z increases. Fission energy is released when a A is larger than approx. 60. Fusion energy is released when lighter nuclei combine.

Carl Friedrich von Weizsäcker's semi-empirical mass formula may be used to express the binding energy as the sum of five terms, which are the volume energy, a surface correction, Coulomb energy, a symmetry term, and a pairing term:

$$B = a_v\mathbf{A} - a_s\mathbf{A}^{2/3} - a_c\frac{\mathbf{Z}^2}{\mathbf{A}^{1/3}} - a_a\frac{(\mathbf{N} - \mathbf{Z})^2}{\mathbf{A}}\pm\Delta$$
where the nuclear binding energy is proportional to the nuclear volume, while nucleons near the surface interact with fewer nucleons, reducing the effect of the volume term. According to Lilley, "For all naturally occurring nuclei, the surface-energy term dominates and the nucleus exists in a state of equilibrium." The negative contribution of Coulomb energy arises from the repulsive electric force of the protons. The symmetry term arises from the fact that effective forces in the nucleus are stronger for unlike neutron-proton pairs, rather than like neutron–neutron or proton–proton pairs. The pairing term arises from the fact that like nucleons form spin-zero pairs in the same spatial state. The pairing is positive if N and Z are both even, adding to the binding energy.

In fission there is a preference for fission fragments with even Z, which is called the odd–even effect on the fragments' charge distribution. This can be seen in the empirical fragment yield data for each fission product, as products with even Z have higher yield values. However, no odd–even effect is observed on fragment distribution based on their A. This result is attributed to nucleon pair breaking.

In nuclear fission events the nuclei may break into any combination of lighter nuclei, but the most common event is not fission to equal mass nuclei of about mass 120; the most common event (depending on isotope and process) is a slightly unequal fission in which one daughter nucleus has a mass of about 90 to 100 daltons and the other the remaining 130 to 140 daltons.

Stable nuclei, and unstable nuclei with very long half-lives, follow a trend of stability evident when Z is plotted against N. For lighter nuclei less than N = 20, the line has the slope N = Z, while the heavier nuclei require additional neutrons to remain stable. Nuclei that are neutron- or proton-rich have excessive binding energy for stability, and the excess energy may convert a neutron to a proton or a proton to a neutron via the weak nuclear force, a process known as beta decay.

Neutron-induced fission of U-235 emits a total energy of 207 MeV, of which about 200 MeV is recoverable, Prompt fission fragments amount to 168 MeV, which are easily stopped with a fraction of a millimeter. Prompt neutrons total 5 MeV, and this energy is recovered as heat via scattering in the reactor. However, many fission fragments are neutron-rich and decay via β^{−} emissions. According to Lilley, "The radioactive decay energy from the fission chains is the second release of energy due to fission. It is much less than the prompt energy, but it is a significant amount and is why reactors must continue to be cooled after they have been shut down and why the waste products must be handled with great care and stored safely."

=== Chain reactions ===
A schematic nuclear fission chain reaction. 1. A uranium-235 atom absorbs a neutron and fissions into two new atoms (fission fragments), releasing three new neutrons and some binding energy. 2. One of those neutrons is absorbed by an atom of uranium-238 and does not continue the reaction. Another neutron is simply lost and does not collide with anything, also not continuing the reaction. However, the one neutron does collide with an atom of uranium-235, which then fissions and releases two neutrons and some binding energy. 3. Both of those neutrons collide with uranium-235 atoms, each of which fissions and releases between one and three neutrons, which can then continue the reaction.

John Lilley states, "...neutron-induced fission generates extra neutrons which can induce further fissions in the next generation and so on in a chain reaction. The chain reaction is characterized by the neutron multiplication factor k, which is defined as the ratio of the number of neutrons in one generation to the number in the preceding generation. If, in a reactor, k is less than unity, the reactor is subcritical, the number of neutrons decreases and the chain reaction dies out. If k > 1, the reactor is supercritical and the chain reaction diverges. This is the situation in a fission bomb where growth is at an explosive rate. If k is exactly unity, the reactions proceed at a steady rate and the reactor is said to be critical. It is possible to achieve criticality in a reactor using natural uranium as fuel, provided that the neutrons have been efficiently moderated to thermal energies." Moderators include light water, heavy water, and graphite.

According to John C. Lee, "For all nuclear reactors in operation and those under development, the nuclear fuel cycle is based on one of three fissile materials, ^{235}U, ^{233}U, and ^{239}Pu, and the associated isotopic chains. For the current generation of LWRs, the enriched U contains 2.5~4.5 wt% of ^{235}U, which is fabricated into UO_{2} fuel rods and loaded into fuel assemblies."

Lee states, "One important comparison for the three major fissile nuclides, ^{235}U, ^{233}U, and ^{239}Pu, is their breeding potential. A breeder is by definition a reactor that produces more fissile material than it consumes and needs a minimum of two neutrons produced for each neutron absorbed in a fissile nucleus. Thus, in general, the conversion ratio (CR) is defined as the ratio of fissile material produced to that destroyed...when the CR is greater than 1.0, it is called the breeding ratio (BR)...^{233}U offers a superior breeding potential for both thermal and fast reactors, while ^{239}Pu offers a superior breeding potential for fast reactors."

=== Fission reactors ===
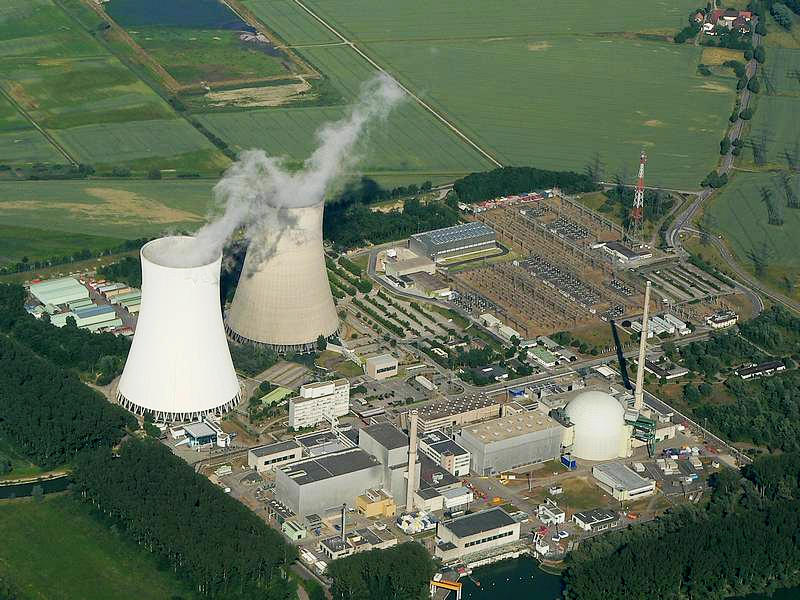
The cooling towers of the Philippsburg Nuclear Power Plant in Germany

Critical fission reactors are the most common type of nuclear reactor. In a critical fission reactor, neutrons produced by fission of fuel atoms are used to induce yet more fissions, to sustain a controllable amount of energy release. Devices that produce engineered but non-self-sustaining fission reactions are subcritical fission reactors. Such devices use radioactive decay or particle accelerators to trigger fissions.

Critical fission reactors are built for three primary purposes, which typically involve different engineering trade-offs to take advantage of either the heat or the neutrons produced by the fission chain reaction:

- power reactors are intended to produce heat for nuclear power, either as part of a generating station or a local power system such as a nuclear submarine.
- research reactors are intended to produce neutrons and/or activate radioactive sources for scientific, medical, engineering, or other research purposes.
- breeder reactors are intended to produce nuclear fuels in bulk from more abundant isotopes. The better known fast breeder reactor makes ^{239}Pu (a nuclear fuel) from the naturally very abundant ^{238}U (not a nuclear fuel). Thermal breeder reactors previously tested using ^{232}Th to breed the fissile isotope ^{233}U (thorium fuel cycle) continue to be studied and developed.

While, in principle, all fission reactors can act in all three capacities, in practice the tasks lead to conflicting engineering goals and most reactors have been built with only one of the above tasks in mind. (There are several early counter-examples, such as the Hanford N reactor, now decommissioned).

As of 2019, the 448 nuclear power plants worldwide provided a capacity of 398 GWE, with about 85% being light-water cooled reactors such as pressurized water reactors or boiling water reactors. Energy from fission is transmitted through conduction or convection to the nuclear reactor coolant, then to a heat exchanger, and the resultant generated steam is used to drive a turbine or generator.

=== Fission bombs ===
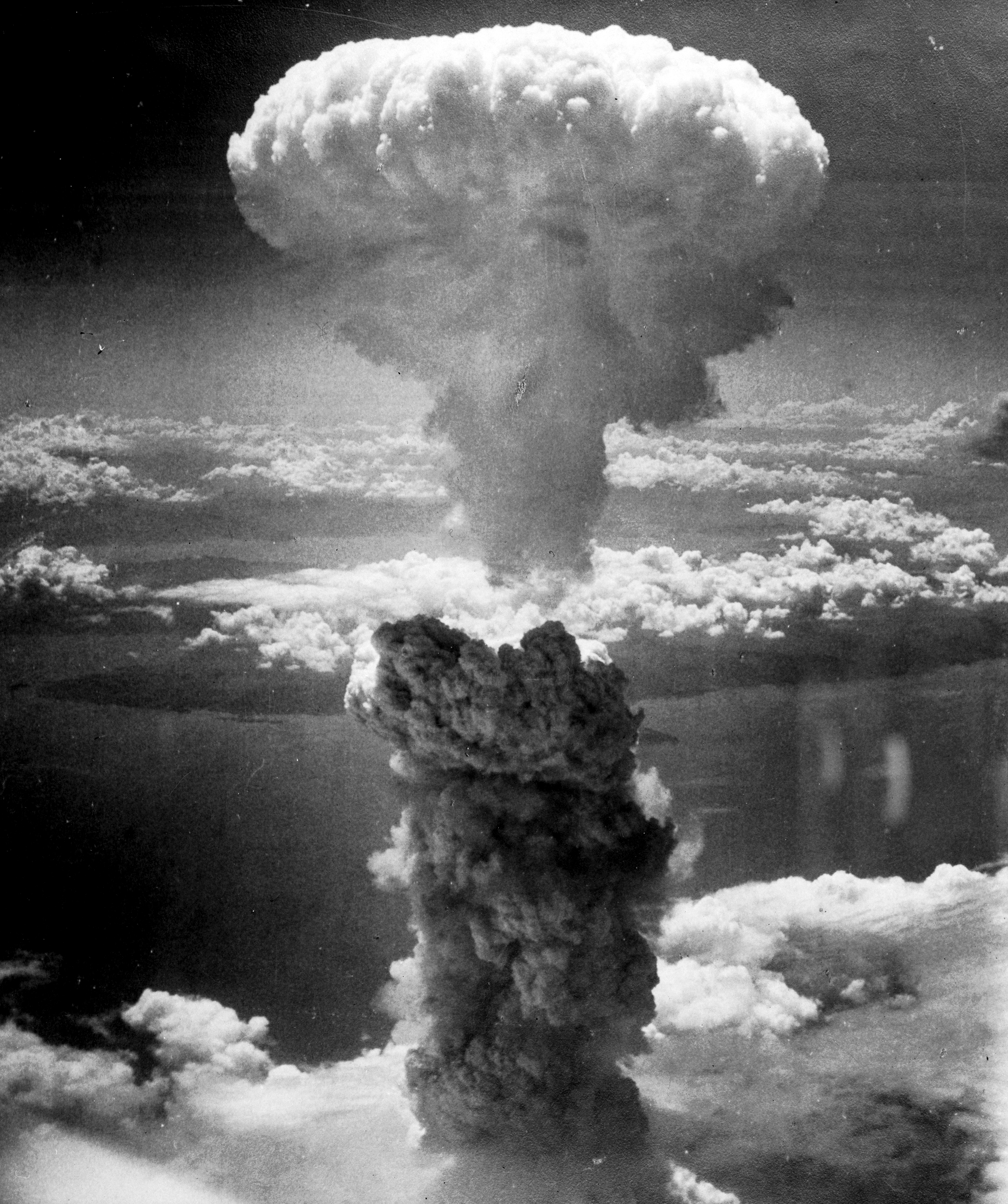
The mushroom cloud of the atomic bomb dropped on Nagasaki, Japan, on 9 August 1945 rose over 12 kilometres (7.5 mi) above the bomb's hypocenter, which killed an estimated 39,000 people.

The objective of an atomic bomb is to produce a device, according to Serber, "...in which energy is released by a fast neutron chain reaction in one or more of the materials known to show nuclear fission." According to Rhodes, "Untamped, a bomb core even as large as twice the critical mass would completely fission less than 1 percent of its nuclear material before it expanded enough to stop the chain reaction from proceeding. Tamper always increased efficiency: it reflected neutrons back into the core and its inertia...slowed the core's expansion and helped keep the core surface from blowing away." Rearrangement of the core material's subcritical components would need to proceed as fast as possible to ensure effective detonation. Additionally, a third basic component was necessary, "...an initiator—a Ra + Be source or, better, a Po + Be source, with the radium or polonium attached perhaps to one piece of the core and the beryllium to the other, to smash together and spray neutrons when the parts mated to start the chain reaction." However, any bomb would "necessitate locating, mining and processing hundreds of tons of uranium ore...", while U-235 separation or the production of Pu-239 would require additional industrial capacity.

== History ==
=== Discovery of nuclear fission ===
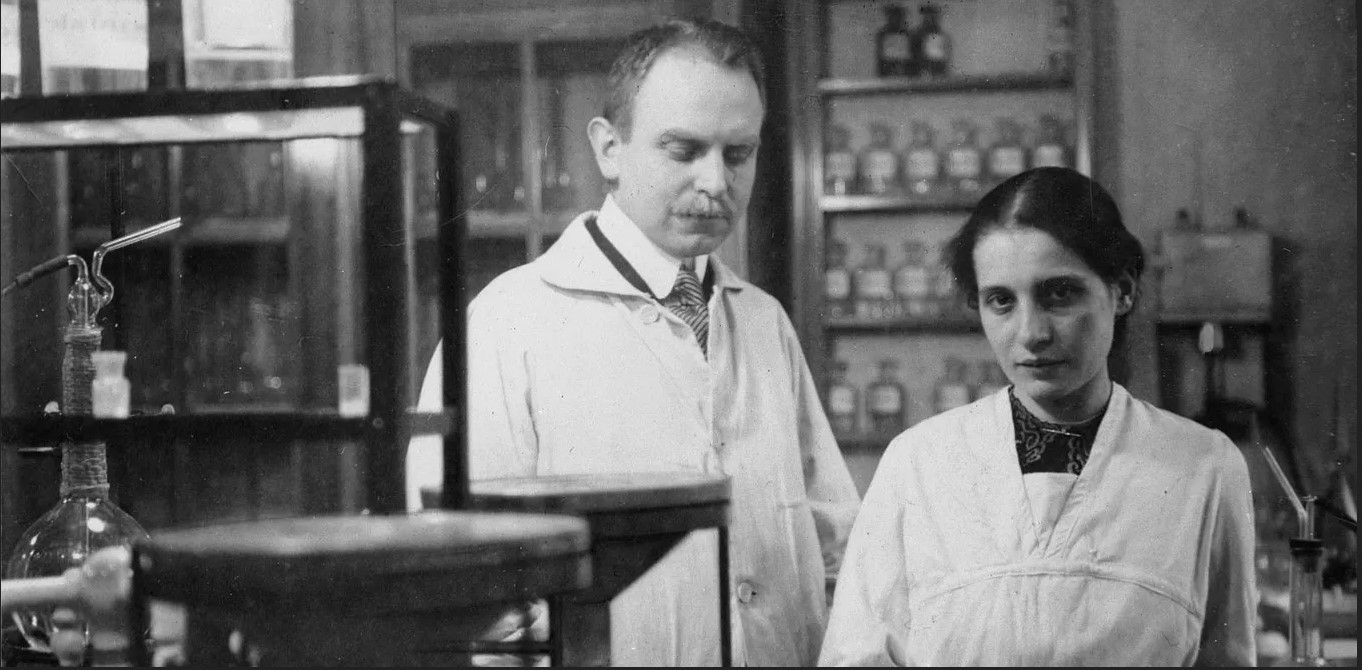
Otto Hahn and Lise Meitner in 1912

The discovery of nuclear fission occurred in 1938 in the buildings of the Kaiser Wilhelm Society for Chemistry, today part of the Free University of Berlin, following over four decades of work on the science of radioactivity and the elaboration of new nuclear physics that described the components of atoms. In 1911, Ernest Rutherford proposed a model of the atom in which a very small, dense and positively charged nucleus of protons was surrounded by orbiting, negatively charged electrons (the Rutherford model). Niels Bohr improved upon this in 1913 by reconciling the quantum behavior of electrons (the Bohr model). In 1928, George Gamow proposed the liquid-drop model, which became essential to understanding the physics of fission.

In 1896, Henri Becquerel had found, and Marie Curie named, radioactivity. In 1900, Rutherford and Frederick Soddy, investigating the radioactive gas emanating from thorium, "conveyed the tremendous and inevitable conclusion that the element thorium was slowly and spontaneously transmuting itself into argon gas!"

In 1919, following up on an earlier anomaly Ernest Marsden noted in 1915, Rutherford attempted to "break up the atom." Rutherford was able to accomplish the first artificial transmutation of nitrogen into oxygen, using alpha particles directed at nitrogen ^{14}N + α → ^{17}O + p. Rutherford stated, "...we must conclude that the nitrogen atom is disintegrated," while the newspapers stated he had split the atom. This was the first observation of a nuclear reaction, that is, a reaction in which particles from one decay are used to transform another atomic nucleus. It also offered a new way to study the nucleus. Rutherford and James Chadwick then used alpha particles to "disintegrate" boron, fluorine, sodium, aluminum, and phosphorus before reaching a limitation associated with the energy of his alpha particle source. Eventually, in 1932, a fully artificial nuclear reaction and nuclear transmutation was achieved by Rutherford's colleagues Ernest Walton and John Cockcroft, who used artificially accelerated protons against lithium-7, to split this nucleus into two alpha particles. The feat was popularly known as "splitting the atom", and would win them the 1951 Nobel Prize in Physics for "Transmutation of atomic nuclei by artificially accelerated atomic particles", although it was not the nuclear fission reaction later discovered in heavy elements.

English physicist James Chadwick discovered the neutron in 1932. Chadwick used an ionization chamber to observe protons knocked out of several elements by beryllium radiation, following up on earlier observations made by Joliot-Curies. In Chadwick's words, "...In order to explain the great penetrating power of the radiation we must further assume that the particle has no net charge..." The existence of the neutron was first postulated by Rutherford in 1920, and in the words of Chadwick, "...how on earth were you going to build up a big nucleus with a large positive charge? And the answer was a neutral particle." Subsequently, he communicated his findings in more detail.

In the words of Richard Rhodes, referring to the neutron, "It would therefore serve as a new nuclear probe of surpassing power of penetration." Philip Morrison stated, "A beam of thermal neutrons moving at about the speed of sound...produces nuclear reactions in many materials much more easily than a beam of protons...traveling thousands of times faster." According to Rhodes, "Slowing down a neutron gave it more time in the vicinity of the nucleus, and that gave it more time to be captured." Fermi's team, studying radiative capture which is the emission of gamma radiation after the nucleus captures a neutron, studied sixty elements, inducing radioactivity in forty. In the process, they discovered the ability of hydrogen to slow down the neutrons.

Enrico Fermi and his colleagues in Rome studied the results of bombarding uranium with neutrons in 1934. Fermi concluded that his experiments had created new elements with 93 and 94 protons, which the group dubbed ausenium and hesperium. However, not all were convinced by Fermi's analysis of his results, though he would win the 1938 Nobel Prize in Physics for his "demonstrations of the existence of new radioactive elements produced by neutron irradiation, and for his related discovery of nuclear reactions brought about by slow neutrons". The German chemist Ida Noddack notably suggested in 1934 that instead of creating a new, heavier element 93, that "it is conceivable that the nucleus breaks up into several large fragments." However, the quoted objection comes some distance down, and was but one of several gaps she noted in Fermi's claim. Although Noddack was a renowned analytical chemist, she lacked the background in physics to appreciate the enormity of what she was proposing.

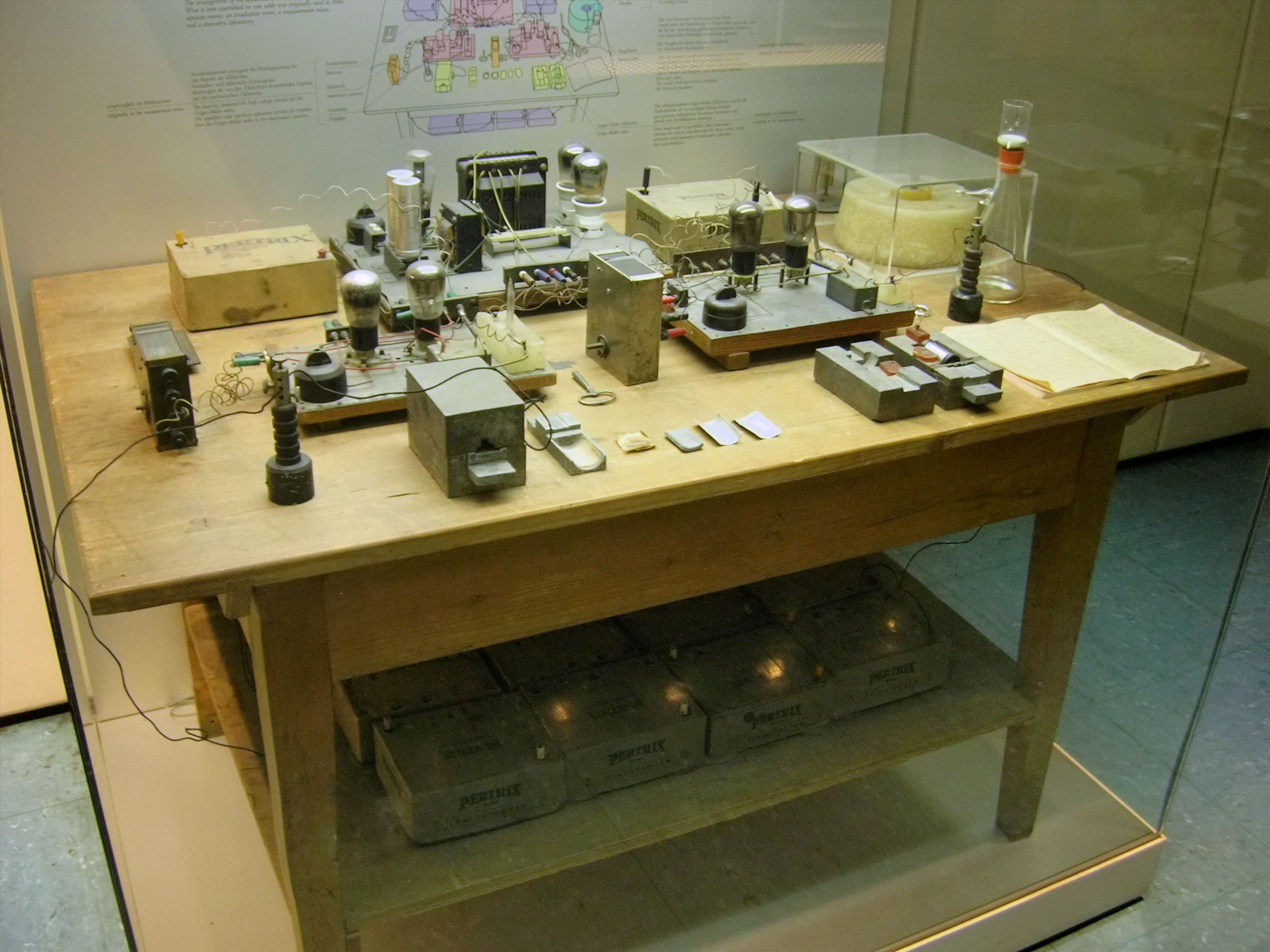
The nuclear fission display at the Deutsches Museum in Munich. The table and instruments are originals, but would not have been together in the same room.

After the Fermi publication, Otto Hahn, Lise Meitner, and Fritz Strassmann began performing similar experiments in Berlin. Meitner, an Austrian Jew, lost her Austrian citizenship with the Anschluss, the union of Austria with Germany in March 1938, but she fled in July 1938 to Sweden and started a correspondence by mail with Hahn in Berlin. By coincidence, her nephew Otto Robert Frisch, also a refugee, was also in Sweden when Meitner received a letter from Hahn dated 19 December describing his chemical proof that some of the product of the bombardment of uranium with neutrons was barium. Hahn suggested a bursting of the nucleus, but he was unsure of what the physical basis for the results were. Barium had an atomic mass 40% less than uranium, and no previously known methods of radioactive decay could account for such a large difference in the mass of the nucleus. Frisch was skeptical, but Meitner trusted Hahn's ability as a chemist. Marie Curie had been separating barium from radium for many years, and the techniques were well known. Meitner and Frisch then correctly interpreted Hahn's results to mean that the nucleus of uranium had split roughly in half. Frisch suggested the process be named "nuclear fission", by analogy to the process of living cell division into two cells, which was then called binary fission. Just as the term nuclear "chain reaction" would later be borrowed from chemistry, so the term "fission" was borrowed from biology.

News spread quickly of the new discovery, which was correctly seen as an entirely novel physical effect with great scientific—and potentially practical—possibilities. Meitner's and Frisch's interpretation of the discovery of Hahn and Strassmann crossed the Atlantic Ocean with Niels Bohr, who was to lecture at Princeton University. I.I. Rabi and Willis Lamb, two Columbia University physicists working at Princeton, heard the news and carried it back to Columbia. Rabi said he told Enrico Fermi; Fermi gave credit to Lamb. Bohr soon thereafter went from Princeton to Columbia to see Fermi. Not finding Fermi in his office, Bohr went down to the cyclotron area and found Herbert L. Anderson. Bohr grabbed him by the shoulder and said: "Young man, let me explain to you about something new and exciting in physics."

It was clear to a number of scientists at Columbia that they should try to detect the energy released in the nuclear fission of uranium from neutron bombardment. On 25 January 1939, a Columbia University team conducted the first nuclear fission experiment in the United States, which was done in the basement of Pupin Hall. The experiment involved placing uranium oxide inside of an ionization chamber and irradiating it with neutrons, and measuring the energy thus released. The results confirmed that fission was occurring and hinted strongly that it was the isotope uranium 235 in particular that was fissioning. The next day, the fifth Washington Conference on Theoretical Physics began in Washington, D.C. under the joint auspices of the George Washington University and the Carnegie Institution of Washington. There, the news on nuclear fission was spread even further, which fostered many more experimental demonstrations. The 6 January 1939 Hahn and Strassman paper announced the discovery of fission. In their second publication on nuclear fission in February 1939, Hahn and Strassmann used the term Uranspaltung (uranium fission) for the first time, and predicted the existence and liberation of additional neutrons during the fission process, opening up the possibility of a nuclear chain reaction. The 11 February 1939 paper by Meitner and Frisch compared the process to the division of a liquid drop and estimated the energy released at 200 MeV. The 1 September 1939 paper by Bohr and Wheeler used this liquid drop model to quantify fission details, including the energy released, estimated the cross section for neutron-induced fission, and deduced ^{235}U was the major contributor to that cross section and slow-neutron fission.

=== Fission chain reaction realized ===
During this period the Hungarian physicist Leó Szilárd realized that the neutron-driven fission of heavy atoms could be used to create a nuclear chain reaction. Such a reaction using neutrons was an idea he had first formulated in 1933, upon reading Rutherford's disparaging remarks about generating power from neutron collisions. However, Szilárd had not been able to achieve a neutron-driven chain reaction using beryllium. Szilard stated, "...if we could find an element which is split by neutrons and which would emit two neutrons when it absorbs one neutron, such an element, if assembled in sufficiently large mass, could sustain a nuclear chain reaction." On 25 January 1939, after learning of Hahn's discovery from Eugene Wigner, Szilard noted, "...if enough neutrons are emitted...then it should be, of course, possible to sustain a chain reaction. All of the things which H. G. Wells predicted appeared suddenly real to me." After the Hahn-Strassman paper was published, Szilard noted in a letter to Lewis Strauss, that during the fission of uranium, "the energy released in this new reaction must be very much higher than all previously known cases...," which might lead to "large-scale production of energy and radioactive elements, unfortunately also perhaps to atomic bombs."

Szilard now urged Fermi (in New York) and Frédéric Joliot-Curie (in Paris) to refrain from publishing on the possibility of a chain reaction, lest the Nazi government become aware of the possibilities on the eve of what would later be known as World War II. With some hesitation Fermi agreed to self-censor. But Joliot-Curie did not, and in April 1939 his team in Paris, including Hans von Halban and Lew Kowarski, reported in the journal Nature that the number of neutrons emitted with nuclear fission of uranium was then reported at 3.5 per fission. Szilard and Walter Zinn found "...the number of neutrons emitted by fission to be about two." Fermi and Anderson estimated "a yield of about two neutrons per each neutron captured."

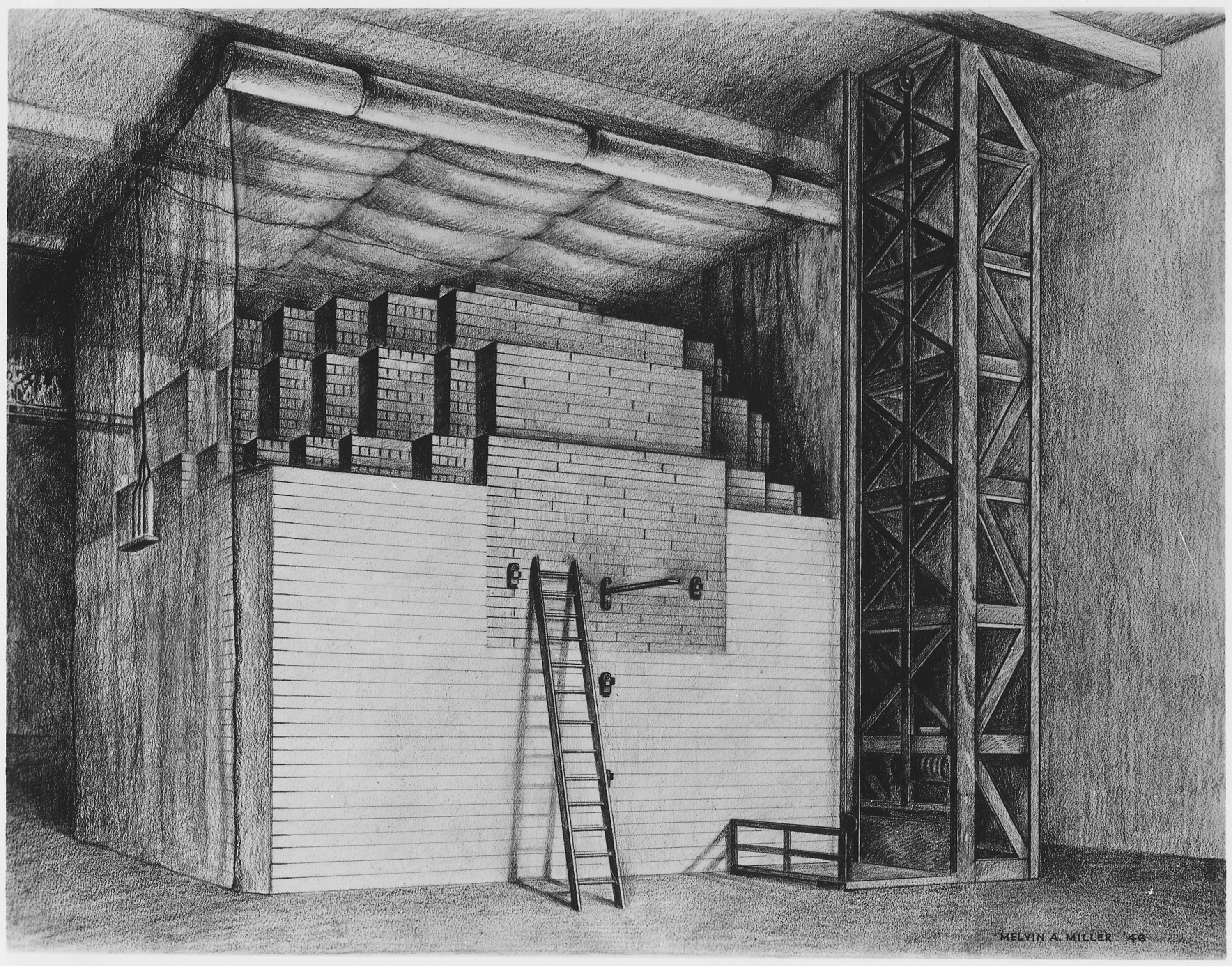
Drawing of the first artificial reactor, Chicago Pile-1

With the news of fission neutrons from uranium fission, Szilárd immediately understood the possibility of a nuclear chain reaction using uranium. In the summer, Fermi and Szilard proposed the idea of a nuclear reactor (pile) to mediate this process. The pile would use natural uranium as fuel. Fermi had shown much earlier that neutrons were far more effectively captured by atoms if they were of low energy (so-called "slow" or "thermal" neutrons), because for quantum reasons it made the atoms look like much larger targets to the neutrons. Thus to slow down the secondary neutrons released by the fissioning uranium nuclei, Fermi and Szilard proposed a graphite "moderator", against which the fast, high-energy secondary neutrons would collide, effectively slowing them down. With enough uranium, and with sufficiently pure graphite, their "pile" could theoretically sustain a slow-neutron chain reaction. This would result in the production of heat, as well as the creation of radioactive fission products.

In August 1939, Szilard, Teller and Wigner thought that the Germans might make use of the fission chain reaction and were spurred to attempt to attract the attention of the United States government to the issue. Towards this, they persuaded Albert Einstein to lend his name to a letter directed to President Franklin Roosevelt. On 11 October, the Einstein–Szilárd letter was delivered via Alexander Sachs. Roosevelt quickly understood the implications, stating, "Alex, what you are after is to see that the Nazis don't blow us up." Roosevelt ordered the formation of the Advisory Committee on Uranium.

In February 1940, encouraged by Fermi and John R. Dunning, Alfred O. C. Nier was able to separate U-235 and U-238 from uranium tetrachloride in a glass mass spectrometer. Subsequently, Dunning, bombarding the U-235 sample with neutrons generated by the Columbia University cyclotron, confirmed "U-235 was responsible for the slow neutron fission of uranium."

At the University of Birmingham, Frisch teamed up with Rudolf Peierls, who had been working on a critical mass formula. assuming isotope separation was possible, they considered ^{235}U, which had a cross section not yet determined, but which was assumed to be much larger than that of natural uranium. They calculated only a pound or two in a volume less than a golf ball, would result in a chain reaction faster than vaporization, and the resultant explosion would generate temperature greater than the interior of the sun, and pressures greater than the center of the earth. Additionally, the costs of isotope separation "would be insignificant compared to the cost of the war." By March 1940, encouraged by Mark Oliphant, they wrote the Frisch–Peierls memorandum in two parts, "On the construction of a 'super-bomb; based on a nuclear chain reaction in uranium," and "Memorandum on the properties of a radioactive 'super-bomb.' ". On 10 April 1940, the first meeting of the MAUD Committee was held.

In December 1940, Franz Simon at Oxford wrote his Estimate of the size of an actual separation plant." Simon proposed gaseous diffusion as the best method for uranium isotope separation.

On 28 March 1941, Emilio Segré and Glen Seaborg reported on the "strong indications that ^{239}Pu undergoes fission with slow neutrons." This meant chemical separation was an alternative to uranium isotope separation. Instead, a nuclear reactor fueled with ordinary uranium could produce a plutonium isotope as a nuclear explosive substitute for ^{235}U. In May, they demonstrated the cross section of plutonium was 1.7 times that of U235. When plutonium's cross section for fast fission was measured to be ten times that of U238, plutonium became a viable option for a bomb.

In October 1941, MAUD released its final report to the U.S. Government. The report stated, "We have now reached the conclusion that it will be possible to make an effective uranium bomb...The material for the first bomb could be ready by the end of 1943..."

In November 1941, John Dunning and Eugene T. Booth were able to demonstrate the enrichment of uranium through gaseous barrier diffusion. On 27 November, Bush delivered to third National Academy of Sciences report to Roosevelt. The report, amongst other things, called for parallel development of all isotope-separation systems. On 6 December, Bush and Conant reorganized the Uranium Committee's tasks, with Harold Urey developing gaseous diffusion, Lawrence developing electromagnetic separation, Eger V. Murphree developing centrifuges, and Arthur Compton responsible for theoretical studies and design.

On 23 April 1942, Met Lab scientists discussed seven possible ways to extract plutonium from irradiated uranium, and decided to pursue investigation of all seven. On 17 June, the first batch of uranium nitrate hexahydrate (UNH) was undergoing neutron bombardment in the Washington University in St. Louis cyclotron. On 27 July, the irradiated UNH was ready for Glenn T. Seaborg's team. On 20 August, using ultramicrochemistry techniques, they successfully extracted plutonium.

In May 1942, Gertrude Scharff Goldhaber at Brookhaven National Laboratory reports for the first the emission of multiple neutrons during spontaneous fission of uranium. Her research was kept a secret.

In April 1939, creating a chain reaction in natural uranium became the goal of Fermi and Szilard, as opposed to isotope separation. Their first efforts involved five hundred pounds of uranium oxide from the Eldorado Radium Corporation. Packed into fifty-two cans two inches in diameter and two feet long in a tank of manganese solution, they were able to confirm more neutrons were emitted than absorbed. However, the hydrogen within the water absorbed the slow neutrons necessary for fission. Carbon in the form of graphite, was then considered, because of its smaller capture cross section. In April 1940, Fermi was able to confirm carbon's potential for a slow-neutron chain reaction, after receiving National Carbon Company's graphite bricks at their Pupin Laboratories. In August and September, the Columbia team enlarged upon the cross section measurements by making a series of exponential "piles". The first piles consisted of a uranium-graphite lattice, consisting of 288 cans, each containing 60 pounds of uranium oxide, surrounded by graphite bricks. Fermi's goal was to determine critical mass necessary to sustain neutron generation. Fermi defined the reproduction factor k for assessing the chain reaction, with a value of 1.0 denoting a sustained chain reaction. In September 1941, Fermi's team was only able to achieve a k value of 0.87. In April 1942, before the project was centralized in Chicago, they had achieved 0.918 by removing moisture from the oxide. In May 1942, Fermi planned a full-scale chain reacting pile, Chicago Pile-1, after one of the exponential piles at Stagg Field reached a k of 0.995. Between 15 September and 15 November, Herbert L. Anderson and Walter Zinn built sixteen exponential piles. Acquisition of purer forms of graphite, without traces of boron and its large cross section, became paramount. Also important was the acquisition of highly purified forms of oxide from Mallinckrodt Chemical Works. Finally, acquiring pure uranium metal from the Ames process, meant the replacement of oxide pseudospheres with Frank Spedding's "eggs". Starting on 16 November 1942, Fermi had Anderson and Zinn working in two twelve-hours shifts, constructing a pile that eventually reached 57 layers by 1 Dec. The final pile consisted of 771,000 pounds of graphite, 80,590 pounds of uranium oxide, and 12,400 pounds of uranium metal, with ten cadmium control rods. Neutron intensity was measured with a boron trifluoride counter, with the control rods removed, after the end of each shift. On 2 Dec. 1942, with k approaching 1.0, Fermi had all but one of the control rod removed, and gradually removed the last one. The neutron counter clicks increased, as did the pen recorder, when Fermi announced "The pile has gone critical." They had achieved a k of 1.006, which meant neutron intensity doubled every two minutes, in addition to breeding plutonium.

=== Manhattan Project and beyond ===
In the United States, an all-out effort for making atomic weapons was begun in late 1942. This work was taken over by the U.S. Army Corps of Engineers in 1943, and known as the Manhattan Engineer District. The top-secret Manhattan Project, as it was colloquially known, was led by General Leslie R. Groves. Among the project's dozens of sites were: Hanford Site in Washington, which had the first industrial-scale nuclear reactors and produced plutonium; Oak Ridge, Tennessee, which was primarily concerned with uranium enrichment; and Los Alamos, in New Mexico, which was the scientific hub for research on bomb development and design. Other sites, notably the Berkeley Radiation Laboratory and the Metallurgical Laboratory at the University of Chicago, played important contributing roles. Overall scientific direction of the project was managed by the physicist J. Robert Oppenheimer.

In July 1945, the first atomic explosive device, dubbed "The Gadget", was detonated in the New Mexico desert in the Trinity test. It was fueled by plutonium created at Hanford. In August 1945, two more atomic devices – "Little Boy", a uranium-235 bomb, and "Fat Man", a plutonium bomb – were used against the Japanese cities of Hiroshima and Nagasaki.

=== Natural fission chain-reactors on Earth ===
Criticality in nature is uncommon. At three ore deposits at Oklo in Gabon, sixteen sites (the so-called Oklo Fossil Reactors) have been discovered at which self-sustaining nuclear fission took place approximately 2 billion years ago. French physicist Francis Perrin discovered the Oklo Fossil Reactors in 1972, but it was postulated by Paul Kuroda in 1956. Large-scale natural uranium fission chain reactions, moderated by normal water, had occurred far in the past and would not be possible now. This ancient process was able to use normal water as a moderator only because 2 billion years before the present, natural uranium was richer in the shorter-lived fissile isotope ^{235}U (about 3%), than natural uranium available today (which is only 0.7%, and must be enriched to 3% to be usable in light-water reactors).

== See also ==
- Cold fission
- Fissile material
- Fission fragment reactor
- Hybrid fusion/fission
- Nuclear fusion
- Nuclear propulsion
- Photofission
- HD 101065 – Star in the constellation Centaurus which contain large amount of thorium, uranium and some short-lived radioactive isotopes.
