= Alfred O. C. Nier =

American physicist

- Nier in 1940 holding a glass mass spectrometer chamber.
- Born: Alfred Otto Carl Nier; May 28, 1911; St. Paul, Minnesota
- Died: May 16, 1994 (aged 82); Minneapolis, Minnesota
- Awards: William Bowie Medal (1992)
- Scientific career
- Fields: Physicist
- Workplaces: University of Minnesota

Alfred Otto Carl Nier (May 28, 1911 – May 16, 1994) was an American physicist who pioneered the development of mass spectrometry. He was the first to use mass spectrometry to isolate uranium-235 which was used to demonstrate that ^{235}U could undergo fission and developed the sector mass spectrometer configuration now known as Nier-Johnson geometry.

== Early life and education ==
He was born in St. Paul, Minnesota on May 28, 1911. Nier showed an early ability in mathematics and science, coupled with an aptitude for craft and mechanical work. Nier's German immigrant parents had little education or financial resources but their determination for his development meant that he was able to attend the nearby University of Minnesota. Though he graduated in electrical engineering in 1931, the lack of engineering jobs during the Great Depression encouraged him to take up graduate study in physics.

== Career ==
=== Harvard ===
In 1936, his spectroscopic skills won him a fellowship and substantial grant at Harvard University. His work there led to the 1938 publication of measurements of the relative abundance of the isotopes of uranium, measurements that were used by Fritz Houtermans and Arthur Holmes in the 1940s to estimate the age of the Earth.

=== The Manhattan Project ===
Nier returned to Minnesota in 1938 to be near his ageing parents. In 1940, on the request of Enrico Fermi, he and a few students, including Edward Ney, prepared a pure sample of uranium-235 using an early mass spectrograph designed by Nier, for John R. Dunning's team at Columbia University. On the day of its receipt (it was sent by US Postal Mail), Dunning's team was able to demonstrate that uranium-235 was the isotope responsible for nuclear fission, rather than the more abundant uranium-238. Confirmation of this suspected fact was a critical step in the development of the atomic bomb.

From 1943 to 1945, Nier worked with Kellex Corporation in Manhattan, New York City on the design and development of efficient and effective mass spectrographs for use in the Manhattan Project to build the atomic bomb in World War II. During the war most of the spectrographs used for monitoring uranium separations were designed by Nier.

=== Later work ===
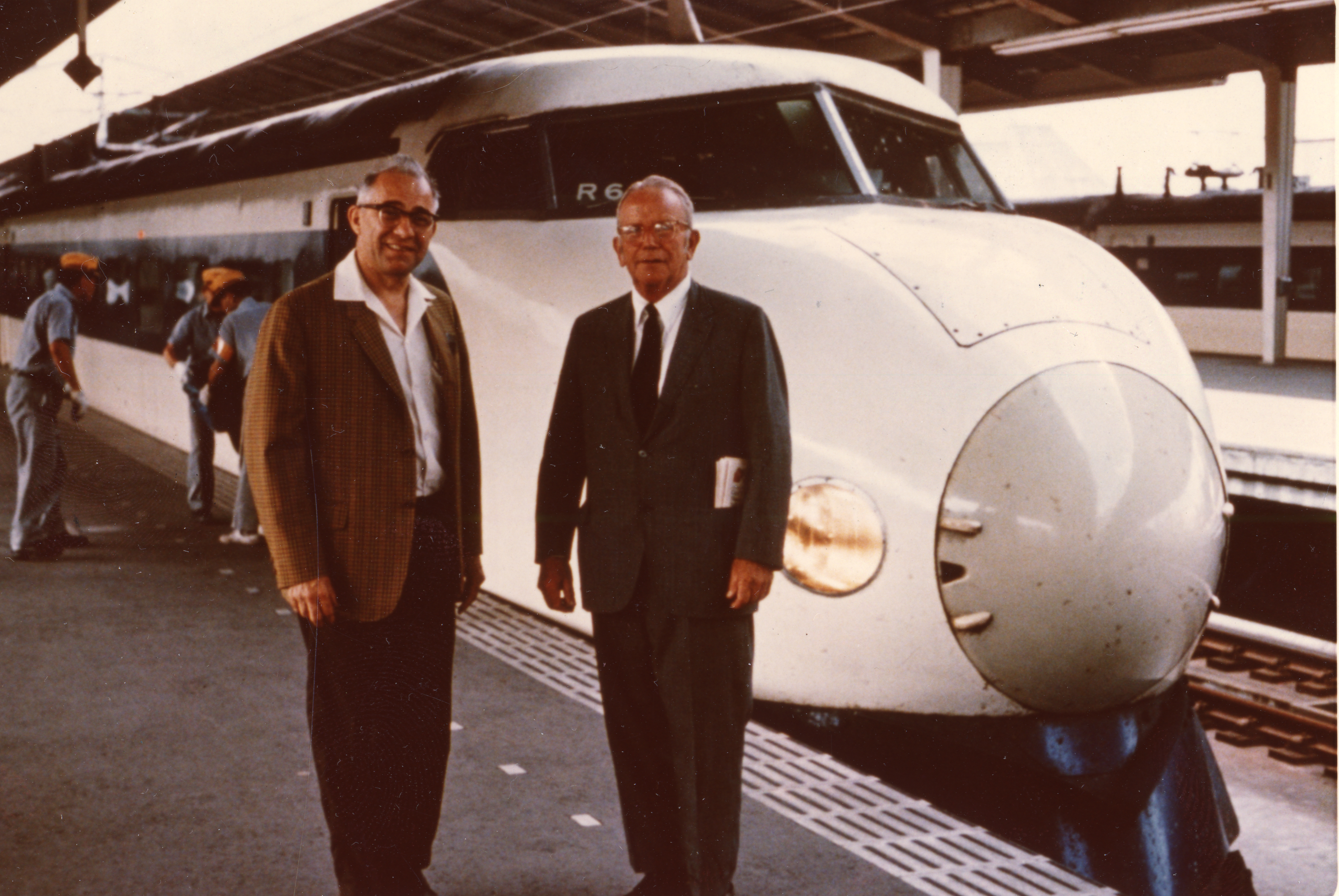
Alfred Nier and Kenneth Bainbridge with the 'Bullet Train' in Tokyo, Japan, 1969

After the war, he returned to Minnesota where he worked on geochronology, the upper atmosphere, space science and noble gases. Nier designed the miniature mass spectrometers used by the Viking Landers to sample the atmosphere of Mars.

== Death ==
Active to the end of his life, he died on May 16, 1994, two weeks after being paralysed in a motor accident.

== Honors ==
Nier was a member of the National Academy of Sciences, the American Philosophical Society, the American Academy of Arts and Sciences, and a foreign scientific member of the Max Planck Society.

The Martian crater Nier and the mineral nierite (tiny silicon nitride inclusions in meteorites) were named after him. The Nier Prize is awarded annually by the Meteoritical Society and recognizes outstanding research in meteoritics and closely allied fields by young scientists.
