= Harold Lichtenberger =

American physicist (1920–1993)

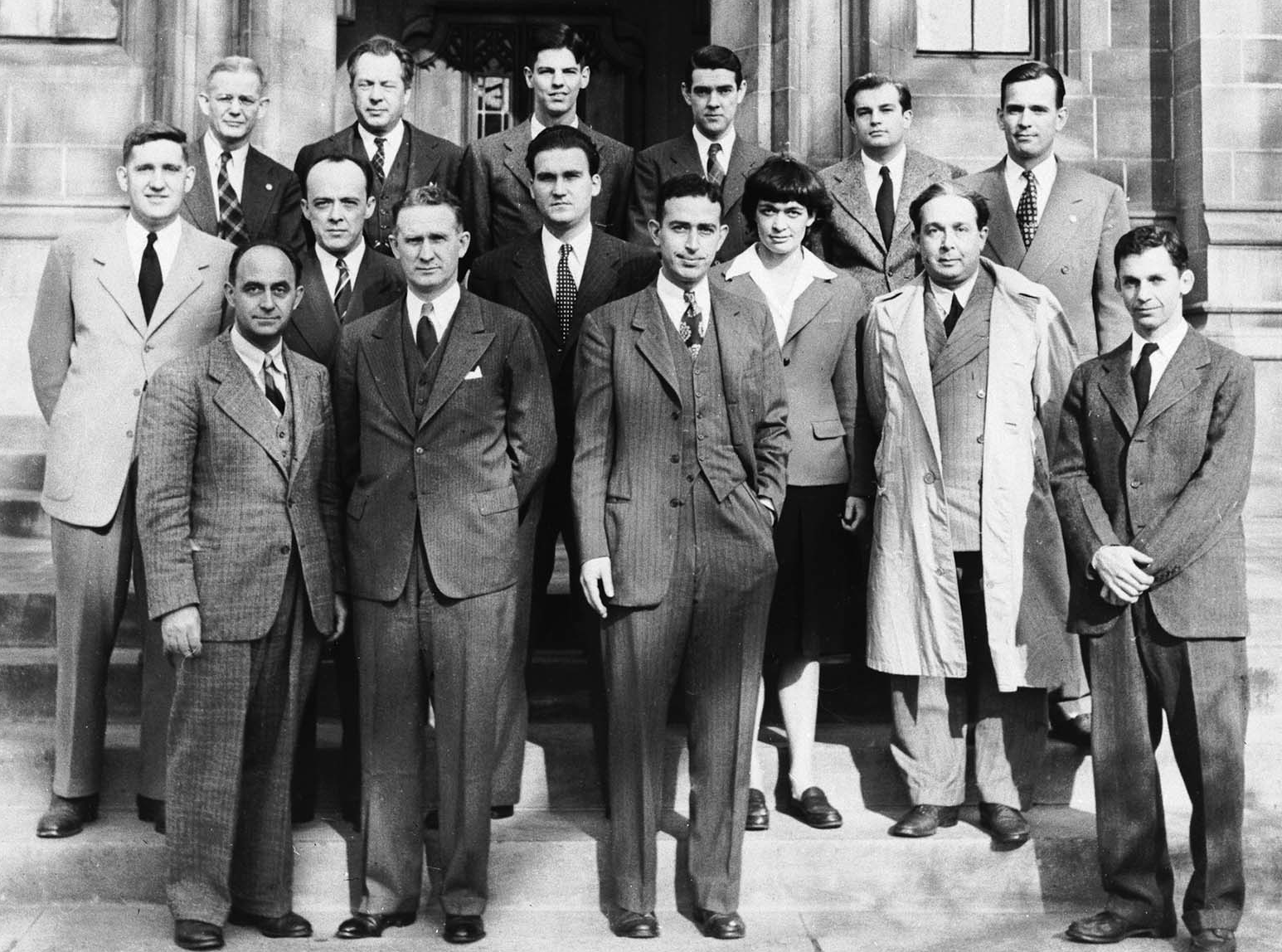
The Chicago Pile team in 1946; Lichtenberger is in the middle row, third from the left.

Harold V. Lichtenberger (April 22, 1920 – December 7, 1993) was an American physicist who was involved in the planning of the Chicago Pile-1, the first nuclear reactor to achieve criticality, and in other reactor experiments at the Argonne National Laboratory.

== Life ==
Lichtenberger was born in Decatur, Illinois. He graduated from Millikin University with a bachelor's degree in 1942. During the construction of the Chicago Pile-1, he was part of the team measuring materials, and during testing he, Warren Nyer and Alvin C. Graves made up a "suicide squadron" known as the liquid-control squad: if the control rods failed, they were to pour a solution of cadmium salts over the reactor to absorb neutrons. He was then responsible, with Albert Nobles, for reassembling the reactor after it was disassembled and moved to the Metallurgical Laboratory's more remote Site A location outside Chicago.

With Albert Wattenberg, Lichtenberger designed and tested the first pressurized heavy-water reactor, Chicago Pile-3, and with Walter Zinn performed a number of other reactor experiments at the Argonne National Laboratory, including the first breeder reactor, EBR-1, and the boiling water reactor BORAX-III, the first reactor to supply power to an entire city (Arco, Idaho, in 1955 with 500 kW). He became director of the Idaho Division of the Metallurgical Laboratory and Argonne National Laboratory, where new reactors were tested.

In 1954, Lichtenberger was also in charge of experiments at the proving ground in Idaho in which experimental reactors were systematically taken beyond criticality and caused to explode by manipulation of the control rods.

He died in West Simsbury, Connecticut, in December 1993, of stomach cancer.
