= Leona Woods =

American nuclear physicist (1919–1986)

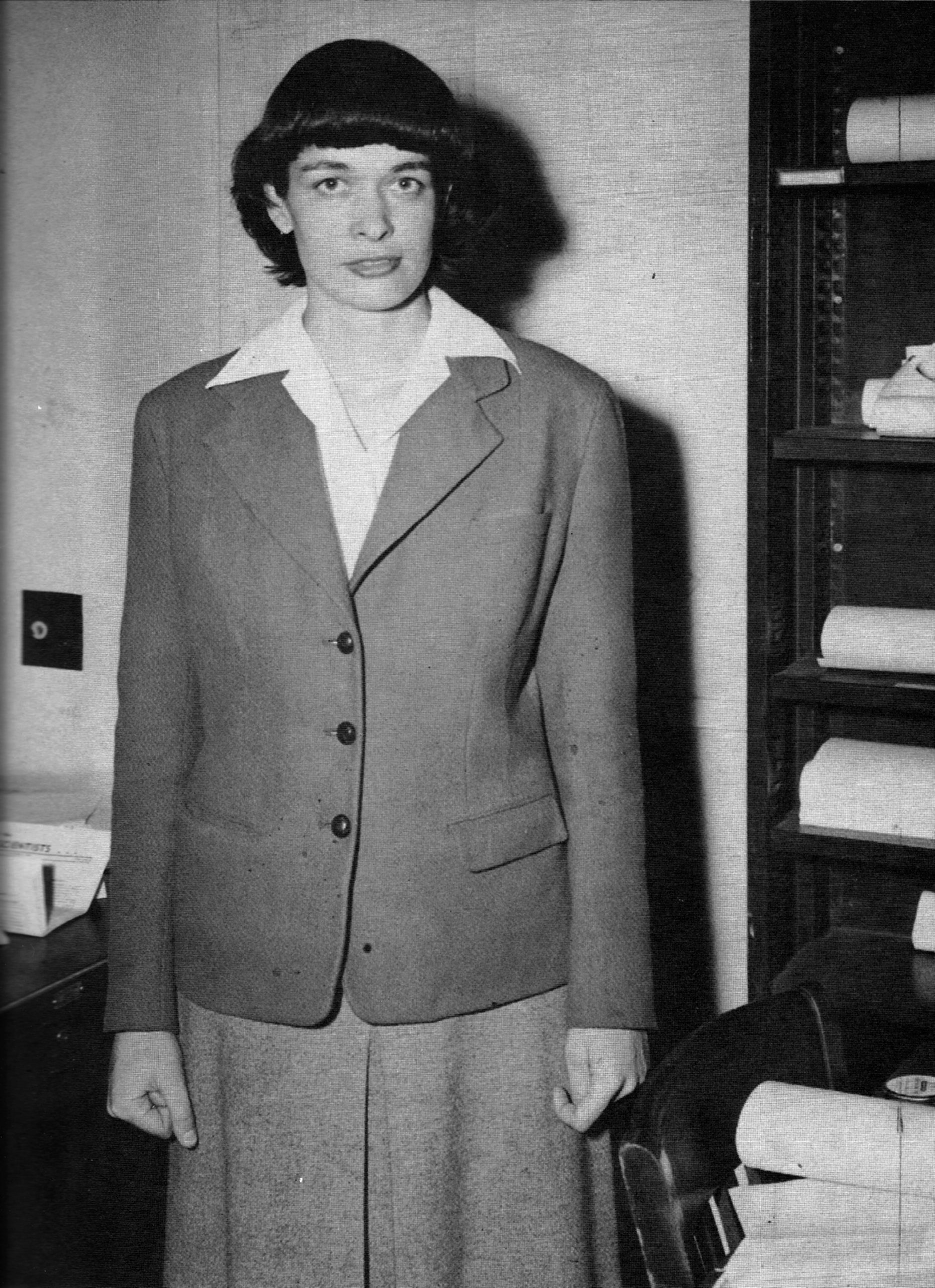
- Woods at the University of Chicago in 1946
- Born: Leona Harriet Woods; August 9, 1919; La Grange, Illinois, U.S.
- Died: November 10, 1986 (aged 67); Santa Monica, California, U.S.
- Education: University of Chicago (BS, MS, PhD)
- Known for: Involvement in the Manhattan Project
- Spouses: John Marshall (m. 1943; div. 1966) Willard Libby (m. 1967; died 1980)
- Children: 2
- Scientific career
- Fields: Physics
- Workplaces: Manhattan Project
- Doctoral advisor: Robert Mulliken
- Other academic advisors: Stanisław Mrozowski

Leona Harriet Woods (August 9, 1919 – November 10, 1986), later known as Leona Woods Marshall and Leona Woods Marshall Libby, was an American physicist who helped build the first nuclear reactor and the first atomic bomb.

At age 23, she was the youngest and only female member of the team which built and experimented with the world's first nuclear reactor (then called a pile), Chicago Pile-1, in a project led by her mentor Enrico Fermi. In particular, Woods was instrumental in the construction and then utilization of geiger counters for analysis during experimentation. She was the only woman present when the reactor went critical. She worked with Fermi on the Manhattan Project, and she subsequently helped evaluate the cross section of xenon, which had poisoned the first Hanford production reactor when it began operation.

After the war, she became a fellow at Fermi's Institute for Nuclear Studies at the University of Chicago. She later worked at the Institute for Advanced Study in Princeton, New Jersey, the Brookhaven National Laboratory, and New York University, where she became a professor in 1962. Her research involved high-energy physics, astrophysics and cosmology. In 1966 she divorced John Marshall and married Nobel laureate Willard Libby. She moved as a professor to the University of Colorado, and was a staff member at RAND Corporation. In later life she became interested in ecological and environmental issues, and she devised a method of using the isotope ratios in tree rings to study climate change. She was a strong advocate of food irradiation as a means of killing harmful bacteria.

== Early life ==
Leona Harriet Woods was born on a farm in La Grange, Illinois, on August 9, 1919, the second of five children of Weightstill Arno Woods, a lawyer, and his wife Mary Leona Holderness Woods. She had two sisters and two brothers. She graduated from Lyons Township High School in La Grange at 14, and received her BS in chemistry from the University of Chicago in 1938, at the age of 18.

After passing her qualifying exams in chemistry, she approached the Nobel Prize for Physics laureate James Franck about being his graduate student, having been impressed by a talk he gave in 1939 on Brillouin zones. Franck accepted, but told her that when he was young his professor had warned him that as a Jewish academic, he would starve to death. Franck therefore warned Woods that "You are a woman and you will starve to death." Despite the fact that Franck did not look malnourished, she took the warning seriously, and decided to instead become a graduate student of Robert Mulliken, who would one day become a Nobel laureate himself.

Mulliken allowed her to choose her own research problem, and edited the final version before it appeared in the Physical Review. Her doctoral thesis, "On the Silicon Oxide Bands", prepared under the supervision of Mulliken and Polish chemist Stanisław Mrozowski was accepted in 1943. Mulliken, she later recalled, had twice told her "that perhaps not all he taught me was wasted." His students, she noted, "agree that this is his highest praise."

== Manhattan Project ==
By 1942, when she was finishing writing up her thesis, she was the youngest and last of Mulliken's pre-war students, and was working alone because all her fellow students had become involved with war work. She met Herbert Anderson, who was working for Enrico Fermi. The two would go swimming together in Lake Michigan every afternoon at 5 pm. Anderson discovered that Woods was adept with vacuum technology from her research, and as soon as her PhD was finished, he hired her to work with the boron trifluoride detectors used to measure neutron flux.

Fermi's group constructed a nuclear reactor known as Chicago Pile-1 under the stands of Stagg Field, the university's abandoned football stadium, where Woods had once played squash. Walter Zinn did not want a woman involved in the dirty work of placing the graphite blocks, but Woods had plenty of work to do with the detectors and thermocouples, and used a small stack of graphite of her own to measure the effects of a radium-beryllium source on manganese foil to obtain a measure of the neutron cross section in order to calibrate the detectors. Her skills in glassblowing were useful in constructing the neutron detectors. She was the only woman present when the reactor went critical, asking Fermi "When do we become scared?"

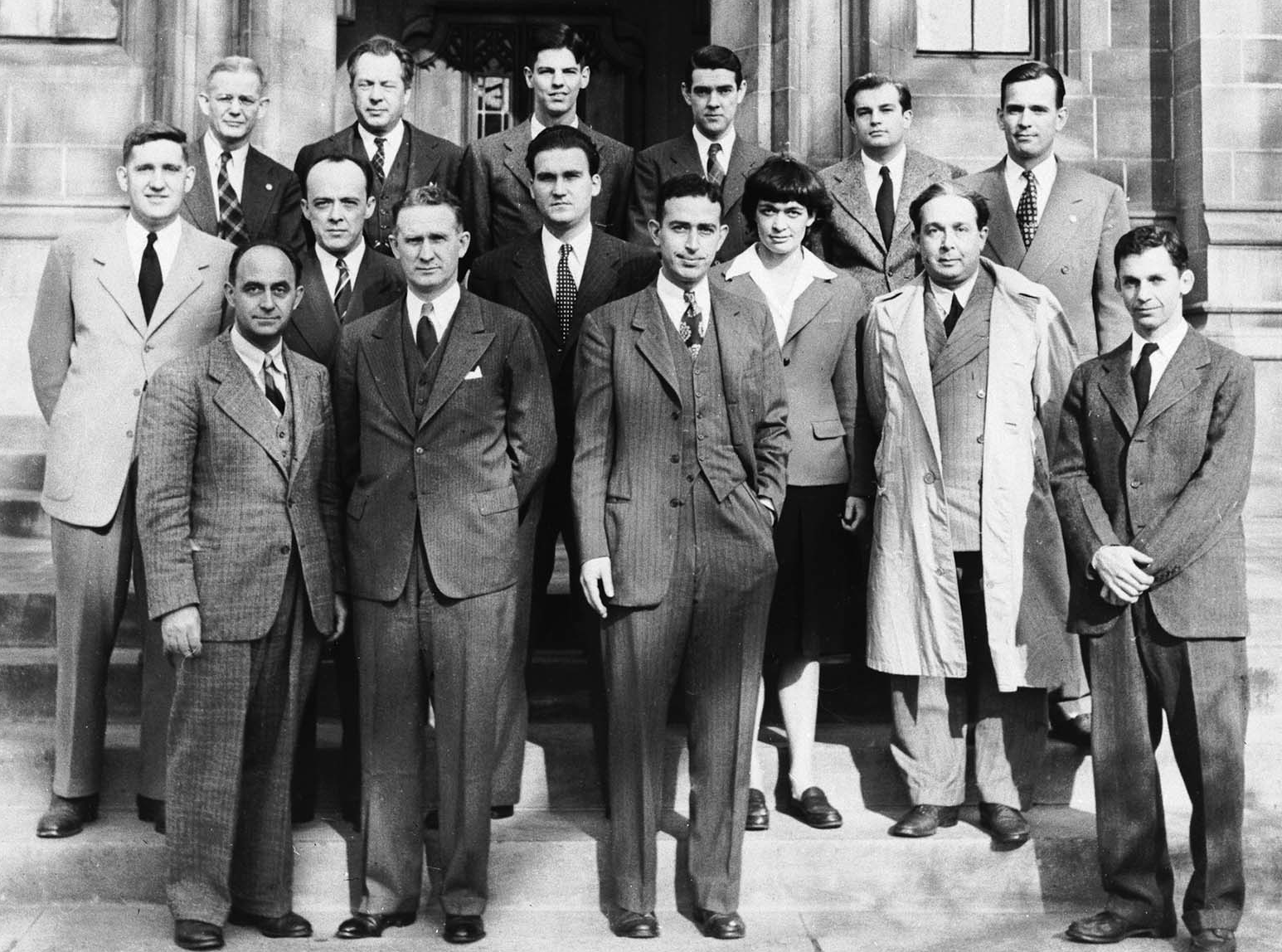
In this 1946 photo of the Chicago pile team, Woods is the only woman, fourth from the left in the middle row.

Laura Fermi remembered Woods as "a tall young girl built like an athlete, who could do a man's job and do it well. She was the only woman physicist in Enrico's group. At that time, her mother, who was also endowed with inexhaustible energy, was running a small farm near Chicago almost by herself. To relieve Mrs. Woods of some work, Leona divided her time between atoms and potatoes."

Like many scientists working on the project, Woods affected a casual attitude towards the danger posed by radiation. After a morning with Willard Libby soldering a canister containing a mixture of radium salt and beryllium metal, Woods absorbed about 200 roentgens, and her white blood cell count halved. The doctors gave her a lecture on how a woman has only a fixed number of egg cells, a proposition that Woods was skeptical of. She considered that the important thing was that the solder was done correctly. When the team moved to their new home at Argonne, Woods had a dormitory all to herself.

Woods married John Marshall in July 1943, and soon after fell pregnant. While she told Enrico Fermi, they agreed not to let Walter Zinn know, for fear that he would insist that she leave the reactor building. She covered up her pregnant belly with her baggy denim work clothes. She rode to work each day on an unheated Army bus, "arriving each morning barely in time to vomit before starting the day's work." The child, a boy called Peter, was born in 1944. She returned to work a few days later.

A team from Argonne was on hand for powering up the first reactor at the Hanford Site, where large reactors would produce plutonium for bombs. They watched the reactor in shifts, with John Marshall and others on the day shift, Enrico Fermi and Leona Marshall on the night shift, ending at midnight, and Don Hughes and John Wheeler on the swing shift. While the Marshalls were babysitting the reactor in Hanford, they left Peter with Leona's mother.

The reactor was powered up successfully, but after a few hours the power level dropped and the reactor shut down. Leona speculated that a water leak was the problem, rather than a radioactive poison. However, during the night the operators were able to power the reactor up again only to have it once more die away. The timings now pointed to a radioactive poison. After working through the numbers with slide rules and hand calculators, they determined the neutron cross section of the poison, which turned out to be xenon-135. Fortunately, the DuPont engineers had equipped the reactor with 50 percent more fuel tubes than the physicists had called for, and by loading them up, they managed to get the reactor started.

Asked many years later about how she felt about her involvement in the Manhattan Project, she said:

I think everyone was terrified that we were wrong (in our way of developing the bomb) and the Germans were ahead of us. That was a persistent and ever-present fear, fed, of course, by the fact that our lead[ing scientists] knew those people in Germany. They went to school with them. Our leaders were terrified, and that terror fed to us. If the Germans had got it before we did, I don't know what would have happened to the world. Something different. Germany led in the field of physics. In every respect, at the time war set in, when Hitler lowered the boom. It was a very frightening time.

I certainly do recall how I felt when the atomic bombs were used. My brother-in-law was captain of the first minesweeper scheduled into Sasebo Harbor. My brother was a Marine, with a flame thrower on Okinawa. I'm sure these people would not have lasted in an invasion. It was pretty clear the war would continue, with half a million of our fighting men dead not to say how many Japanese. You know and I know that General (Curtis) LeMay firebombed Tokyo and nobody even mentions the slaughter that happened then. They think Nagasaki and Hiroshima were something compared to the firebombing.

THEY'RE WRONG!

I have no regrets. I think we did right, and we couldn't have done it differently. Yeah. I know it has been suggested the second bomb, Nagasaki, was not necessary. The guys who cry on shoulders, when you are in a war, to the death, I don't think you stand around and ask, "Is it right?"

== Post-war career ==
After the war, Leona Marshall returned to the University of Chicago, where she became a fellow at Fermi's Institute for Nuclear Studies. Working with the Chicago Pile 3 heavy-water reactor, she found a way to 100 percent spin polarize neutron beams, and determined the refractive index of neutrons for various materials. Her second child, John Marshall III, was born in 1949. She became an assistant professor in 1953.

After Fermi died in 1954, the Marshalls separated. John Marshall returned to the Los Alamos Laboratory, while Leona, now effectively a single mother, became a fellow at the Institute for Advanced Study in Princeton, New Jersey in 1957. The following year she became a fellow at the Brookhaven National Laboratory, at a time when the focus of research in physics was shifting away from the nucleus and towards elementary particles. In 1960, she joined New York University as an associate professor of physics. She became a professor in 1962.

Three years later, she became a professor at the University of Colorado, researching high-energy physics, astrophysics and cosmology. She then became a staff member at RAND Corporation, where she would work until 1976. She began publishing as Leona Marshall Libby after she divorced Marshall in 1966 and married Willard Libby the next year. In 1973 she joined Libby at UCLA, where she became a visiting professor of environmental studies, engineering, engineering archaeology, mechanical aerospace and nuclear engineering.

She and Willard Libby helped organize UCLA's department of environmental science and engineering. At UCLA, she devised a method of inferring past values of temperature and rainfall from tree rings using the isotope ratios of oxygen-18 to oxygen-16, carbon-13 to carbon-12, and deuterium to hydrogen. This method is now a tool in the study of paleoclimatology.

Like Willard Libby, she was a strong advocate of food irradiation as a means of killing off harmful bacteria, and advocated that legal and regulatory restrictions on its use be relaxed. She proposed that, instead of it being sprayed with malathion, fruit affected by the Mediterranean fruit fly could be treated with gamma rays.

She was a prolific author, publishing over 200 scientific papers. While at RAND she wrote a paper on Creation of an Atmosphere for the Moon (1969). Her works include the autobiographical The Uranium People (1979), a history of early atomic research. After Libby died in 1980, she edited his papers with Rainer Berger, and published The Life Work of Nobel Laureate Willard Libby (1982). Her last paper, on quasi-stellar objects, appeared in 1984.

She died at St. John's Medical Center in Santa Monica, California, on November 10, 1986, from an anesthesia-induced stroke. She was survived by her sons Peter and John, and four grandchildren. She also had two stepdaughters, Janet Eva and Susan Charlotte, from her second marriage.

== Legacy ==
Libby was the subject of the book La donna della bomba atomica by Italian physicist Gabriella Greison.

Libby is the namesake of Leona Marshall Libby Middle School in West Richland, Washington.

== Selected bibliography ==
- Libby, L., M. (1969) Creation of an atmosphere for the moon. Rand Corporation.
- Libby, L., M. (1970) Fifty environmental problems of timely importance. Rand Corporation.
- Libby, L., M. (1979) The Uranium People. Crane, Russak.
- Libby, L., M. (1980) The upside down cosmology and the lack of solar neutrinos.
- Libby, L., M. (1982) Life Work of Nobel Laureate Willard Frank Libby.
- Libby, L., M. (1982) Carbon Dioxide and Climate. Pergamon.
- Libby, L., M. (1983) Past Climates: Tree Thermometers, Commodities, and People. Texas: University of Texas.
