= George Weil =

George Leon Weil
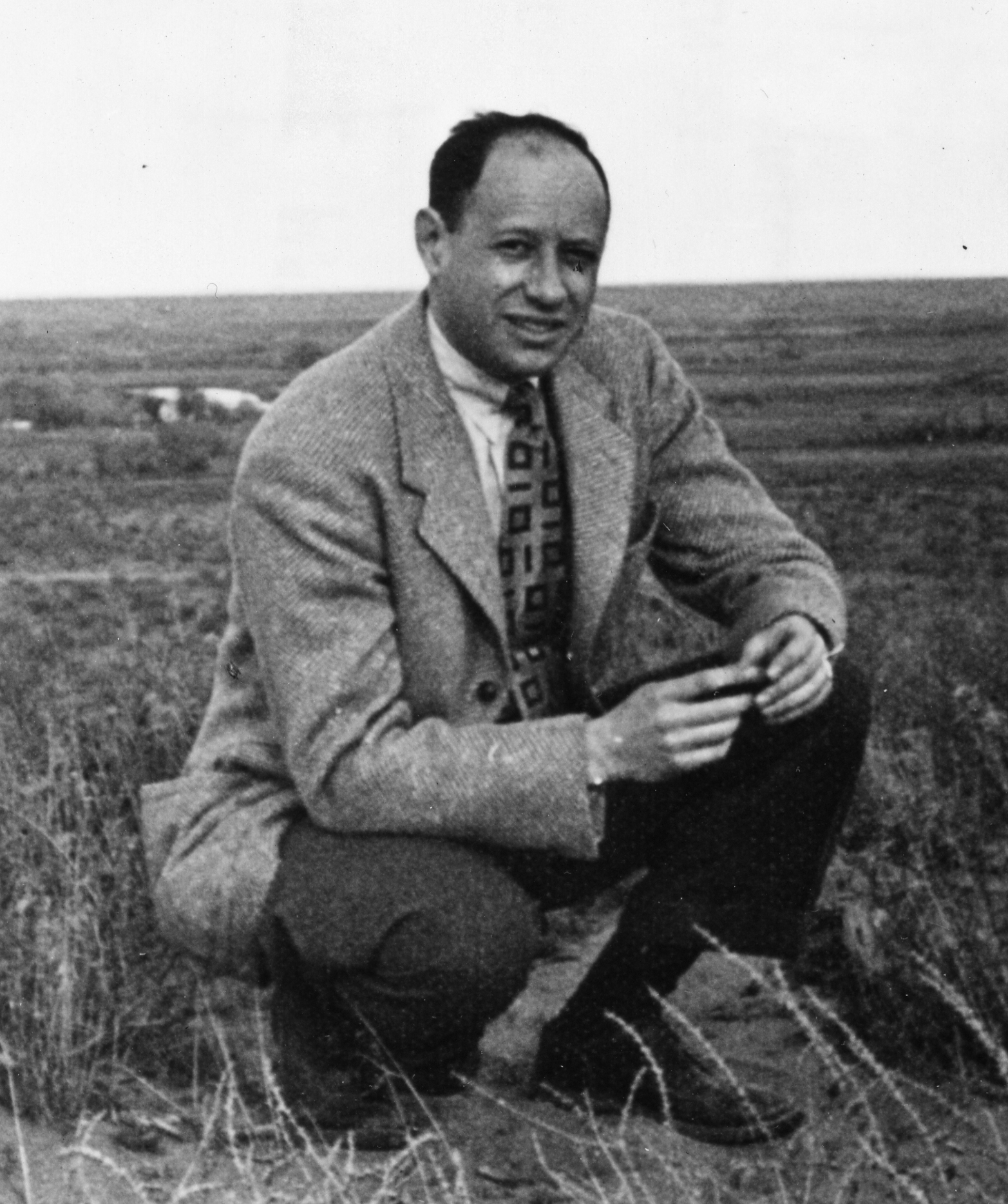
- Born: September 18, 1907; New York City
- Died: July 1, 1995 (aged 87); Washington, DC
- Education: Harvard College; Columbia University
- Scientific career
- Fields: Physicist
- Workplaces: Columbia University; Metallurgical Laboratory; Los Alamos Laboratory; General Electric; Atomic Energy Commission
- Thesis: Beta-Ray Spectra of Arsenic, Rubidium and Krypton (1942)

George Leon Weil (September 18, 1907 – July 1, 1995) was an American physicist. On December 2, 1942, he removed the control rod from the Chicago Pile-1 nuclear reactor, initiating the first man-made, self-sustaining nuclear chain reaction.

== Early life ==
George Leon Weil was born in New York City on September 18, 1907, the son of Leon and Elsie Rose Weil. His great-grandfather was Henry Lehman (1822–1855), founder of H. Lehman, which became Lehman Brothers. He had an older sister, Helen. He entered Harvard College, from which he graduated in 1929 and then Columbia University, where he earned his master's degree, and later his doctorate, writing his 1942 doctoral thesis on Beta-Ray Spectra of Arsenic, Rubidium and Krypton. It was subsequently published in the Physical Review in September 1942.

== Manhattan Project ==
At Columbia University, Weil became involved in Enrico Fermi's efforts to build a nuclear reactor. In December 1941, the Office of Scientific Research and Development assumed responsibility for this project, which was placed under the direction of Arthur Compton.

In early 1942, Compton concentrated the teams he was responsible for, at the Metallurgical Laboratory at the University of Chicago. Fermi's group became primarily responsible for building a reactor, while Eugene Wigner's group was responsible for its design. In September 1942, the Metallurgical Laboratory became part of the Army Manhattan Project. Construction of the reactor, which became known as Chicago Pile-1 (CP-1), commenced in November 1942, under the West Stands of the University of Chicago's disused Stagg Field.

CP-1 was ready on December 2, 1942; Weil worked the final control rod, while Fermi monitored the neutron activity. The pile went critical at 15:36, initiating the first man-made, self-sustaining nuclear chain reaction. Fermi shut it down 28 minutes later, by having the control rods re-inserted. Weil continued to work in reactor development and in April 1945, went to the Los Alamos Laboratory, where he worked on the Trinity nuclear test. In October 1945, he was appointed the American representative at the Chalk River Laboratories in Canada.

== Atomic Energy Commission ==
After the war, Weil worked for General Electric on reactor design. He then joined the Atomic Energy Commission (AEC), where he became the assistant director of the Reactor Development Division. He argued for a more cautious approach to reactor development and was critical of the early design work on high flux reactors. Alvin Weinberg later opined that:

Weil's lack of enthusiasm I think may have reflected his general skepticism towards breeder reactors—a skepticism that eventually included all of nuclear energy. George, the physicist who operated the control rod during the first chain reaction of December 2, 1942, became the first articulate opponent of nuclear energy.

In 1948, Weil was part of an AEC delegation, which also included Walter Zinn and Charles Wende, that went to Britain as part of the so-called modus vivendi that had replaced the wartime nuclear Special Relationship, between Britain and the United States. They visited Harwell and saw the GLEEP and BEPO reactors. The Zinn-Weil-Wende report came as a shock to the AEC Commissioners, as it indicated that the British were far more technologically advanced than they had thought.

== Later life ==
Weil left the AEC in 1952, to become an independent consultant, working for various businesses, government bodies and non-profit organisations such as the Friends of the Earth. In 1955, he was the technical director of the United States delegation to the United Nations conference in Geneva, on the peaceful use of atomic energy. He published a book, Nuclear Energy: Promises, Promises, in 1971, in which he attacked the nuclear energy industry for its reliance on subsidies, its technological and economic inefficiency, ineptitude and its dangers.

In later life, Weil suffered from strokes and heart problems. He died at the Georgetown House retirement home in Washington, DC, on July 1, 1995. His wife Vinette died in 1978. He was survived by his son, Stephen, and sister, Helen Weil Benjamin (1905-1996).
