= Albert Wattenberg =

American physicist (1917–2007)

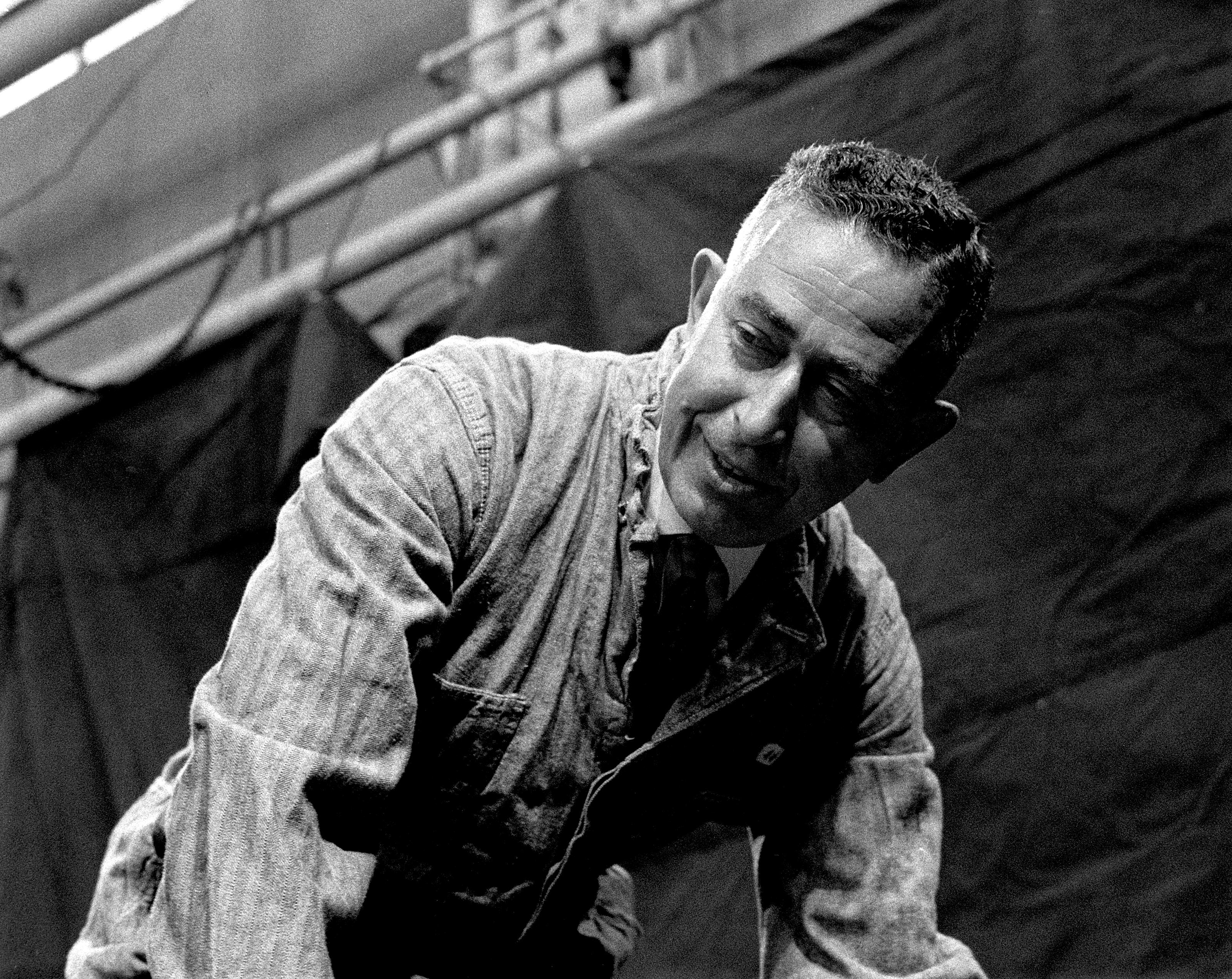
- Wattenberg during the construction of Chicago Pile-1
- Born: Albert Wattenberg; April 13, 1917; New York, New York
- Died: June 27, 2007 (aged 90); Urbana, Illinois
- Citizenship: American
- Education: City College of New York; Columbia University; University of Chicago
- Scientific career
- Fields: High-energy physics
- Workplaces: Metallurgical Laboratory; Argonne National Laboratory; Massachusetts Institute of Technology; University of Illinois at Urbana–Champaign
- Thesis: Photo-neutron sources and the energy of the photo-neutrons (1947)
- Doctoral advisor: Walter Zinn

Albert Wattenberg (April 13, 1917 – June 27, 2007), was an American experimental physicist. During World War II, he was with the Manhattan Project's Metallurgical Laboratory at the University of Chicago. He was a member of the team that built Chicago Pile-1, the world's first artificial nuclear reactor, and was one of those present on December 2, 1942, when it achieved criticality. In July 1945, he was one of the signatories of the Szilard petition. After the war he received his doctorate, and became a researcher at the Argonne National Laboratory from 1947 to 1950, at Massachusetts Institute of Technology from 1951 to 1958, and at University of Illinois at Urbana–Champaign from 1958 to 1986, where he pursued studies related to the atomic nucleus.

== Early life ==
Albert Wattenberg was born in New York City, New York, on April 13, 1917, the son of Louis and Bella Wattenberg. He had an older brother William (Bill), who helped pioneer the field of educational psychology, as well as a younger brother, Lee, who became a medical researcher. He grew up in New York City, and attended DeWitt Clinton High School, where he helped win the New York math championships. He entered the City College of New York, from which he received his BSc in 1938, and the Columbia University, where he earned his MA in 1939. A politically active student, he organized strikes and a boycott of his own 1938 graduation ceremony in protest against the City College president's Italian Fascist sympathies. After he left Columbia, he took a summer course in spectroscopy at the Massachusetts Institute of Technology (MIT).

In 1939, Wattenberg joined Schenley Industries, a distiller of whiskey, where he performed spectroscopic analysis. He joined US Steel in 1940. The consequential increase in salary and reduction in working hours to 30 hours per week enabled him to go back to graduate school at Columbia University to get his PhD. In 1941, his studies were interrupted by World War II. Enrico Fermi asked him to join the group at Columbia working on the nuclear fission of uranium that also included Herbert L. Anderson, Bernard T. Feld, Leo Szilard and Walter Zinn. Wattenberg learned how to build and maintain the Geiger counters and photon and neutron detectors.

== Manhattan Project ==
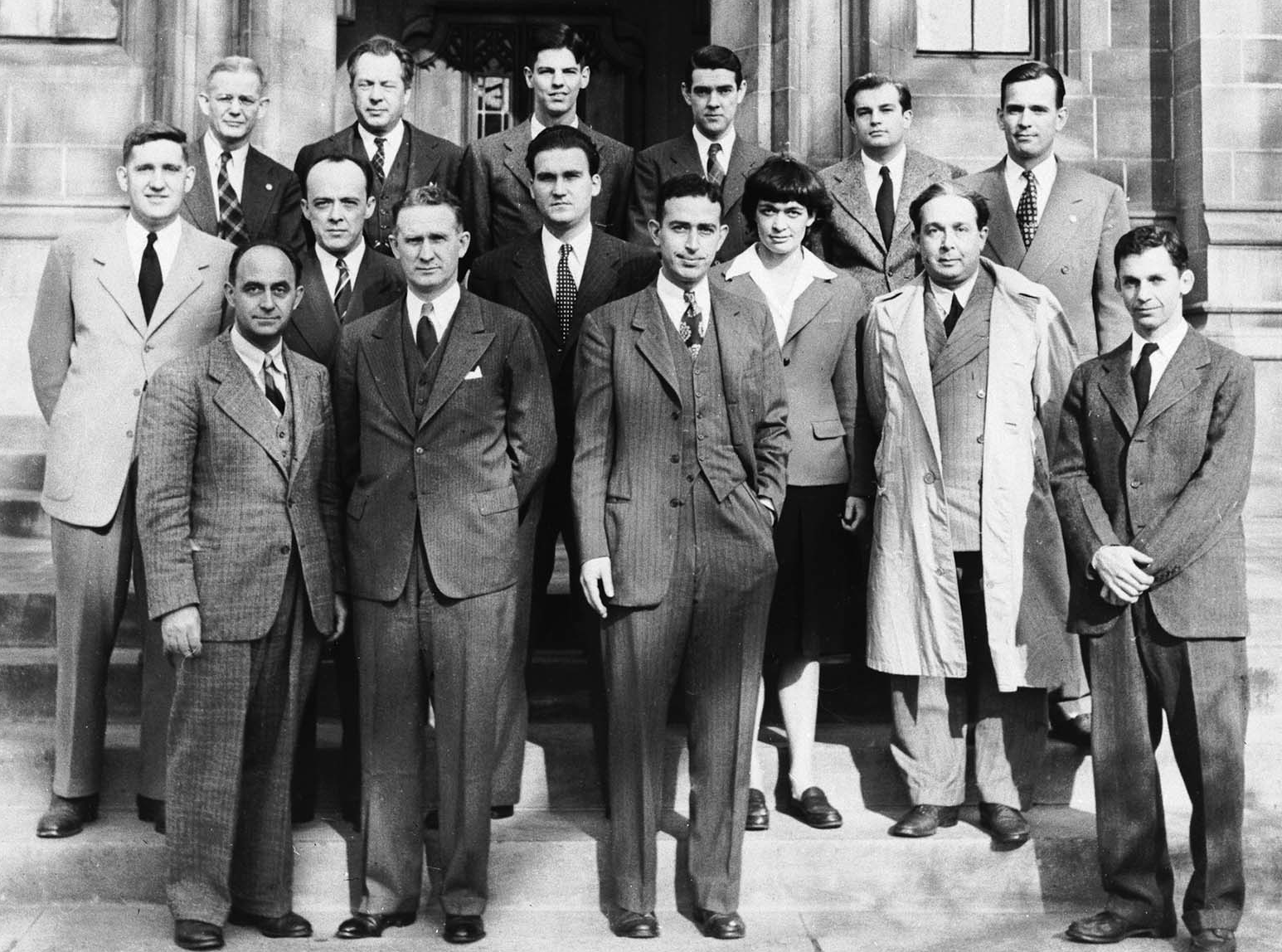
On 2 December 1946, the fourth anniversary CP-1 going critical, members of the team gathered at the University of Chicago. In the front row is Enrico Fermi, Walter Zinn, Albert Wattenberg and Herbert L. Anderson.

Arthur Compton concentrated the teams involved in plutonium and nuclear reactor research at Columbia University, Princeton University, the University of Chicago at the Manhattan Project's Metallurgical Laboratory at the University of Chicago in early 1942. There, Wattenberg built and maintained detectors and neutron sources. Indeed, after 1943, he built and maintained all the radium and beryllium neutron sources used by the entire Manhattan Project. He assisted in the construction of Chicago Pile-1, the world's first artificial nuclear reactor, and was one of those present on December 2, 1942, when it achieved criticality. Afterwards, Eugene Wigner opened a bottle of Chianti to celebrate, which those present drank from paper cups. The bottle was signed by those present, and kept as a souvenir by Wattenberg. In 1980, he donated it to the Argonne National Laboratory.

In 1943, Wattenberg married Shirley Hier, a graduate of Hunter College. She became an educator and social worker, working as a medical social worker at Cook County Hospital from 1945 to 1947, as an instructor and clinical researcher at the Harvard School of Public Health from 1954 to 1958, and as a caseworker, supervisor, and acting director of Family Services in Champaign, Illinois, from 1959 to 1966. She was an assistant professor at the School of Social Work at the University of Illinois at Urbana–Champaign from 1966 to 1973, and then with its College of Medicine. They had three daughters.

After Fermi left the Metallurgical Laboratory for the Los Alamos Laboratory, Wattenberg worked with Leo Szilard. In July 1945, he was one of the signatories of the Szilard petition, which urged that "the United States shall not, in the present phase of the war, resort to the use of atomic bombs." His brother Lee aboard a ship, destined to participate in the invasion of Japan. "Maybe my brother's alive because we used the atomic bomb", he later opined, "Maybe the military was right ... I just wish we had tried a demonstration first." In September 1945, soon after the war ended, he became one of the founders of the Federation of Atomic Scientists, the publishers of the Bulletin of the Atomic Scientists.

== Later life ==
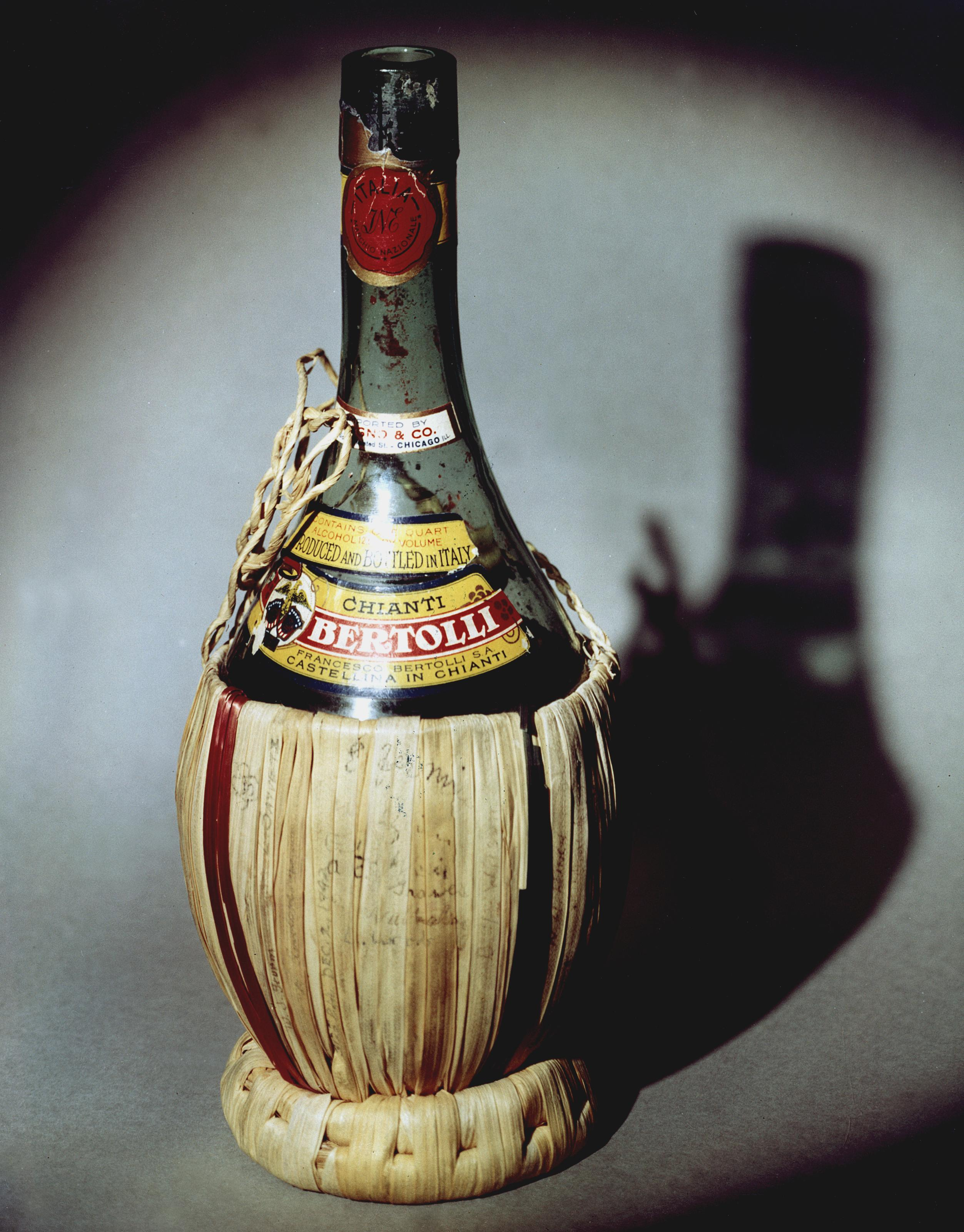
The Chianti bottle purchased by Eugene Wigner to help celebrate the first self-sustaining, controlled chain reaction. Wattenberg donated it to the Argonne National Laboratory in 1980.

With the war over, Wattenberg returned to his studies, completing his PhD at the University of Chicago under the supervision of Walter Zinn. He wrote his thesis on "Photo-neutron sources and the energy of the photo-neutrons", and earned his doctorate in 1947. Rather than work in academia, he chose to join Fermi at the Argonne National Laboratory, where he helped design and build nuclear reactors. Wattenberg became director of Argonne's Physics Division in 1949. He did not agree with Zinn's decision, as director of the laboratory, to concentrate on reactor design rather than basic research.

By 1950, the rise of McCarthyism led to Wattenberg leaving Argonne, first to go to the University of Illinois at Urbana–Champaign for a year, and then to MIT, where he remained until 1958. He used MIT's synchrotron to study the properties of nucleons and K-mesons, gaining important insights that would later be incorporated into the Standard Model. In 1958, he was recruited by the University of Illinois at Urbana–Champaign. Although he did do some teaching, he was largely free to work at Argonne and the Brookhaven National Laboratory on his research into K-meson decay. He published a paper with J.J. Sakurai in 1967 about his efforts to distinguish matter from antimatter. He worked on the giant scintillation counters at Fermilab, and directed searches for charm quark s there with photon and neutron beams, and at SLAC using colliding electron-positron beams. Between 1953 and 2003, he was the author of over 115 papers. He retired in 1986.

In retirement, Wattenberg became involved with the American Physical Society's Forum of the History of Physics, as a councillor, secretary-treasurer, and editor of the newsletter. He contributed articles to the Bulletin of the Atomic Scientists about the beginnings of the Atomic Age and his work assisting Fermi. He co-edited Fermi's papers with Laura Fermi, and participated in celebrations of the 100th anniversary of Enrico Fermi's birth at the University of Chicago in 2001. During the 1980s he was on the executive committee of the Champaign-Urbana chapter of SANE/Nuclear Freeze. He was also a Democratic Party precinct committeeman. He made frequent appearances on Studs Terkel's radio show, and in NPR's All Things Considered, usually on the occasion of the anniversary of Chicago Pile-1 going critical, or of the atomic bombings of Hiroshima and Nagasaki.

Wattenberg's wife Shirley died in 1989. In 1992, he married Alice Wyers von Neumann, a social worker. He died at Clark-Lindsey Village in Urbana, Illinois, on June 27, 2007. He was survived by his wife Alice, daughters Beth, Jill and Nina, and his brother Lee.

== Bibliography ==
- Anderson, Herbert L. (1975). "Assisting Fermi". In Wilson, Jane (ed.). All In Our Time: The Reminiscences of Twelve Nuclear Pioneers. Chicago: Bulletin of the Atomic Scientists. pp. 66–104. OCLC 1982052.
- Holl, Jack M.; Hewlett, Richard G.; Harris, Ruth R. (1997). Argonne National Laboratory, 1946–96. University of Illinois Press. ISBN 978-0-252-02341-5.
- Rhodes, Richard (1986). The Making of the Atomic Bomb. London: Simon & Schuster. ISBN 0-671-44133-7.
- Wattenberg, Albert (1975). "Present at Creation". In Wilson, Jane (ed.). All In Our Time: The Reminiscences of Twelve Nuclear Pioneers. Chicago: Bulletin of the Atomic Scientists. pp. 105–123. OCLC 1982052.
