= Alvin C. Graves =

American nuclear physicist (1909–1965)

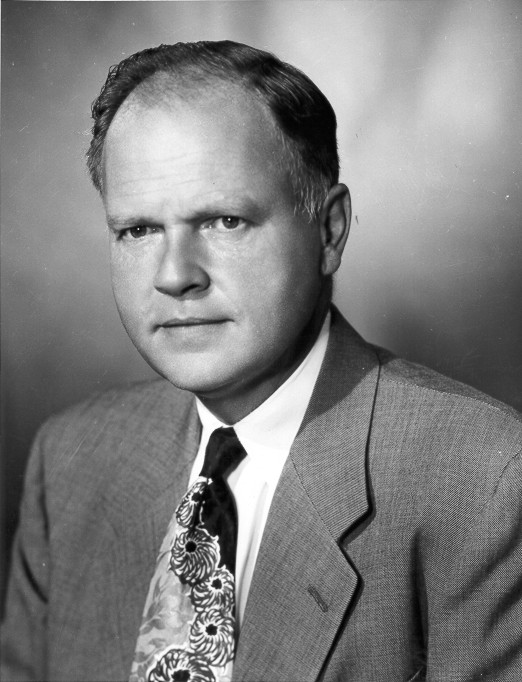
- Born: November 4, 1909; Washington, D.C., US
- Died: July 28, 1965 (aged 55); Del Norte, Colorado, US
- Education: University of Virginia; University of Chicago
- Occupation: Physicist
- Known for: Nuclear testing
- Spouse: Elizabeth Riddle Graves
- Scientific career
- Fields: Nuclear physics
- Workplaces: University of Chicago; University of Texas; Metallurgical Laboratory; Los Alamos National Laboratory
- Thesis: Packing Fraction Differences Among Heavy Elements (1939)

Alvin Cushman Graves (November 4, 1909 – July 28, 1965) was an American nuclear physicist who served at the Manhattan Project's Metallurgical Laboratory and the Los Alamos Laboratory during World War II. After the war, he became the head of the J (Test) Division at Los Alamos and was director or assistant director of numerous nuclear weapons tests during the 1940s and 1950s. Graves was severely injured in the 1946 laboratory criticality accident in Los Alamos that killed Louis Slotin, but recovered.

== Early life ==
Alvin Cushman Graves was born on November 4, 1909, in Washington, D.C., the youngest of six children. He was the son of Herbert C. Graves, an engineer with the United States Coast and Geodetic Survey and member of the American Commission to Negotiate Peace after World War I. Graves attended Eastern High School and graduated at the top of his class from the University of Virginia in 1931 with a bachelor's degree in electrical engineering. He attended the Massachusetts Institute of Technology for a year but found that jobs were hard to come by during the Great Depression. He received a graduate fellowship to the University of Chicago, where he earned his Ph.D., writing his thesis on "Packing Fraction Differences Among Heavy Elements".

At Chicago, Graves met and married Elizabeth Riddle, a physics major there, who was known as "Diz". Elizabeth Riddle Graves earned her Ph.D., writing her thesis on "Energy Release from Beryllium-9 (Alpha, Alpha) Lithium-7 and the Production of Lithium-7". Graves remained at the University of Chicago as a research fellow and an assistant professor until 1939, when he moved to the University of Texas. Elizabeth was unable to secure a job there as well due to its anti-nepotism rules.

== Manhattan Project ==
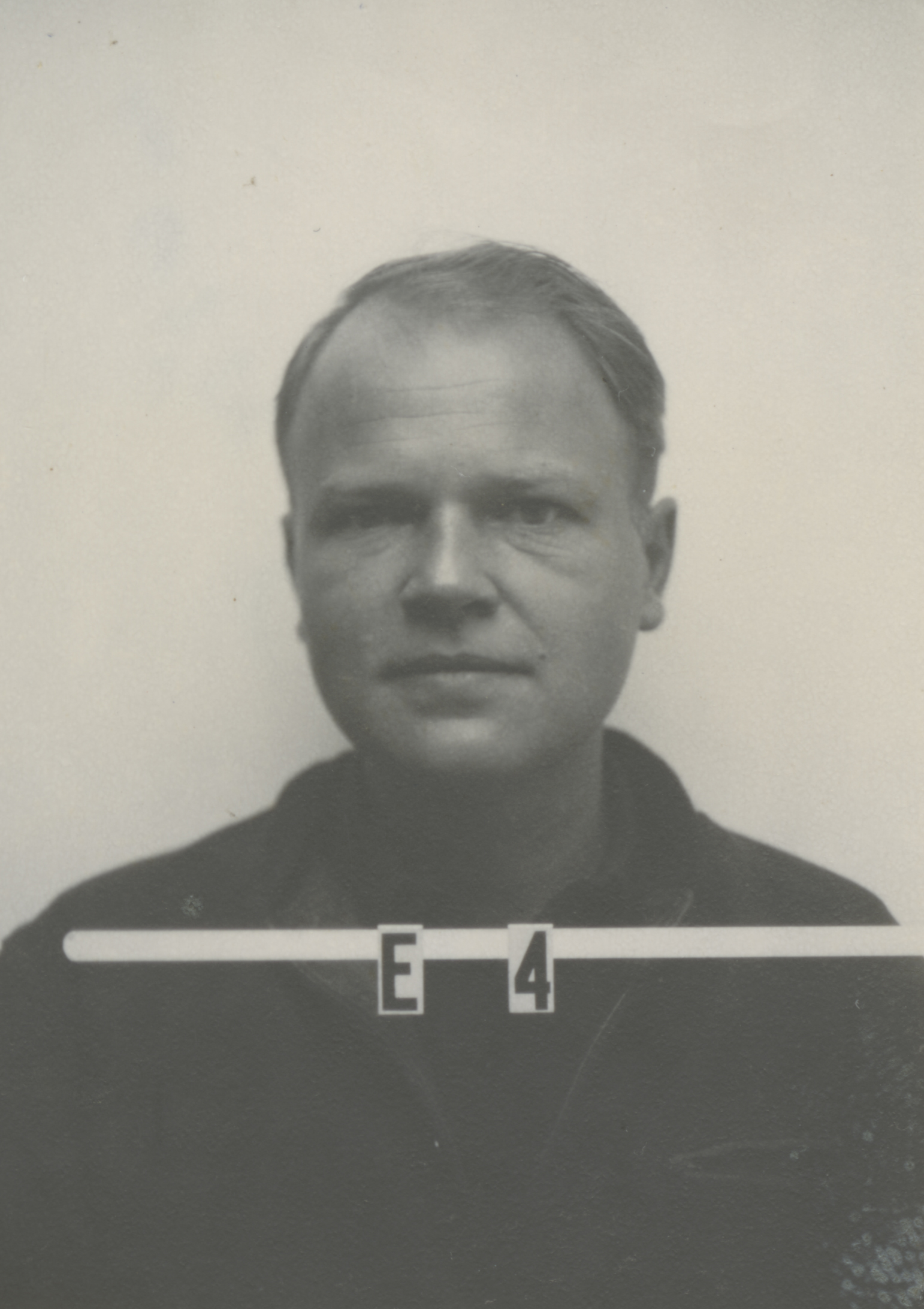
Alvin Graves' Los Alamos badge

In 1942, Graves was invited back to the University of Chicago by Arthur H. Compton. Graves had already received a request from the MIT Radiation Laboratory to work on radar, and he asked if he could contribute more to Compton's project. Compton replied that he could. He joined the Manhattan Project's Metallurgical Laboratory, and helped build the first nuclear reactor, the Chicago Pile-1. Graves, Harold V. Lichtenberger and Warren Nyer formed Enrico Fermi's "suicide squad" or "liquid-control squad", assigned to smash 5-US-gallon (19 L; 4.2 imp gal) glass bottles containing a solution of cadmium sulfate over the reactor with hammers if something went wrong. Cadmium is a strong neutron absorber and Fermi hoped that this would halt a runaway nuclear chain reaction, if the reactor control rods proved to be incapable of halting it in the first place.

Graves and Elizabeth moved to work at Los Alamos Laboratory in New Mexico when it opened in 1943. He made it a condition of his going to Los Alamos that a job be found there for her. This was probably unnecessary, as someone with her skills—she was one of the few physicists who had experience with a Cockcroft–Walton generator—would have been quickly snapped up at Los Alamos. At the time of the Trinity nuclear test in 1945, Elizabeth was seven months pregnant with her first child. Graves, therefore, requested that they be assigned to a post far from the blast. They listened to Samuel K. Allison's countdown to the explosion on the radio. They monitored the radioactive fallout from the test, which took until the afternoon to reach them, with survey meters. The child was a healthy daughter, Marilyn Edith.

Graves was severely injured in the 1946 laboratory criticality accident at Los Alamos that killed Louis Slotin. Slotin, who was training Graves to replace him in his position as chief bomb assembler for Los Alamos, was demonstrating the dangerous "tickling the dragon's tail" test to Graves and several other scientists when the accident occurred. Graves, who was nearest to Slotin, suffered an estimated dose of 390 roentgens, and was given a 50 percent chance of survival. This caused severe radiation poisoning, loss of hair, and a sperm count of zero. He recovered fully after two weeks of hospitalization and several weeks of convalescence. In a few months, he was back at work and skiing vigorously, with only a bald spot on the head to show for the experience. Two years later he and his wife had a healthy child, their second, a son they named Alvin Palmer (who became a chemistry lecturer at Florida International University).

== Later life ==
Graves became dismissive of the radiation risks from nuclear testing while serving as test director for the Nevada Test Site shots during the 1950s. He announced that the risks from fallout were "concocted in the minds of weak malingerers." As a spokesman for the Nevada Test Site, he spoke in local areas around Nevada, assuring the population of no danger from the activities there. As the head of the Los Alamos Laboratory's J (Test) Division, he was the scientific director or deputy director of most of the nuclear tests from 1948 through the 1950s, including the Desert Rock exercises which exposed military personnel to radiation, and the Castle Bravo test that irradiated many native islanders and test personnel. Asked to testify before the Joint Committee on Atomic Energy on the danger of radiation causing cancer, Graves replied:

The danger is not that this will happen to you. The danger is that it is more likely to happen to you. Maybe the more likely is not very much more likely, but it is still more likely.

Graves was a pillar of the Los Alamos community. He was an active member of the non-denominational Protestant Community Church. With the encouragement of Elizabeth, who played the violin, he learned to play the cello, hoarding his petrol ration stamps so that he could travel to Santa Fe, New Mexico, for lessons. He played in the Los Alamos Symphony, accompanying local performances of Gilbert and Sullivan and Handel's Messiah. He was chairman of the board of the local bank and a member of the local school board.

Graves died of a heart attack on July 19, 1965, while skiing in Del Norte, Colorado, twenty years after the Slotin accident, at the age of 55. He had suffered from hypertension even before the 1946 accident, and had a minor heart attack in December 1955. His father had also died of a heart attack. A 1978 follow-up study of the Slotin accident victims suggested that latent systemic damage from the accident contributed to heart failure. His remains, and those of his wife Elizabeth, were interred at Guaje Pines Cemetery in Los Alamos.
