= Chicago Pile-1 =

World's first human-made nuclear reactor

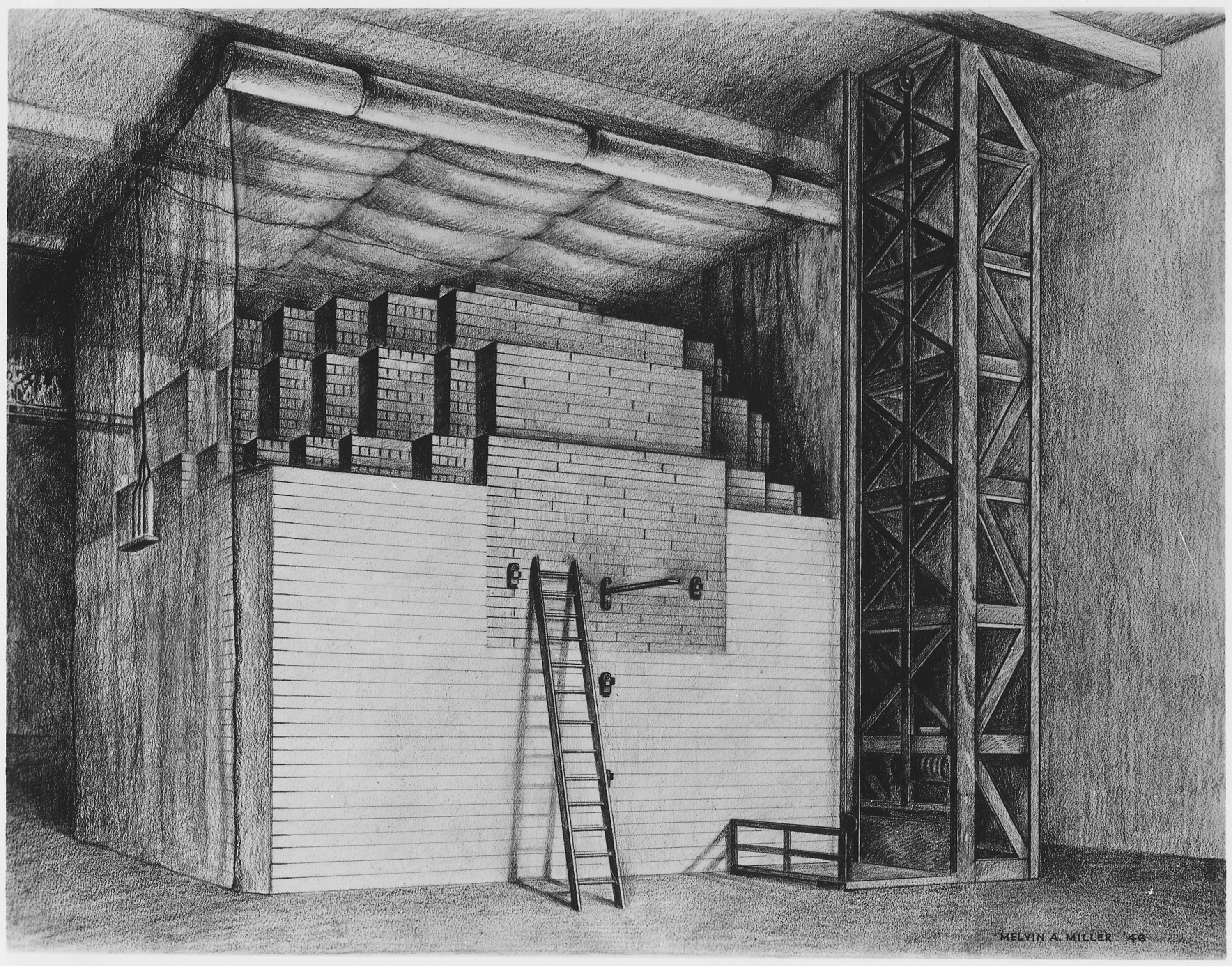
- Sketch of Chicago Pile-1
- Reactor concept: Research reactor
- Designed and built by: Metallurgical Laboratory
- Operational: 1942 to 1943 (83 years ago)
- Status: Dismantled
- Location: Chicago, Illinois, US

Main parameters of the reactor core
- Fuel (fissile material): Natural uranium
- Fuel state: Solid (pellets)
- Neutron energy spectrum: Slow
- Primary control method: Control rods
- Primary moderator: Nuclear graphite (bricks)
- Primary coolant: None

Reactor usage
- Primary use: Experimental
- Criticality (date): 2 December 1942
- Operator/owner: University of Chicago / Manhattan Project
- Remarks: World's first artificial nuclear reactor
- Site of the First Self Sustaining Nuclear Reaction
- U.S. National Register of Historic Places
- U.S. National Historic Landmark
- U.S. Historic district – Contributing property
- Chicago Landmark
- Location within Greater Chicago
- Coordinates: 41°47′33″N 87°36′4″W
- Built: 1942
- Part of: Hyde Park–Kenwood Historic District (ID79000824)
- NRHP reference No.: 66000314

Significant dates
- Added to NRHP: 15 October 1966 (66000314)
- Designated NHL: 18 February 1965
- Designated CHICL: 27 October 1971

Chicago Pile-1 (CP-1) was the first artificial nuclear reactor. On 2 December 1942, the first human-made self-sustaining nuclear chain reaction was initiated in CP-1 during an experiment led by Enrico Fermi. The secret development of the reactor was the first major technical achievement for the Manhattan Project, the Allied effort to create nuclear weapons during World War II. Developed by the Metallurgical Laboratory at the University of Chicago, CP-1 was built under the west viewing stands of the original Stagg Field. Although the project's civilian and military leaders had misgivings about the possibility of a disastrous runaway reaction, they trusted Fermi's safety calculations and decided they could carry out the experiment in a densely populated area. Fermi described the reactor as "a crude pile of black bricks and wooden timbers".

After a series of attempts, the successful reactor was assembled in November 1942 by a team of about 30 that, in addition to Fermi, included scientists Leo Szilard (who had previously formulated an idea for non-fission chain reaction), Leona Woods, Herbert L. Anderson, Walter Zinn, Martin D. Whitaker, and George Weil. The reactor used natural uranium. This required a very large amount of material in order to reach criticality, along with graphite used as a neutron moderator. The reactor contained 45,000 ultra-pure graphite blocks weighing 360 short tons (330 tonnes) and was fueled by 5.4 short tons (4.9 tonnes) of uranium metal and 45 short tons (41 tonnes) of uranium oxide. Unlike most subsequent nuclear reactors, it had no radiation shielding or cooling system as it operated at very low power – about one-half watt; nonetheless, the reactor's success meant that a chain reaction could be controlled and the nuclear reaction studied and put to use.

The pursuit of a reactor had been touched off by concern that Nazi Germany had a substantial scientific lead. The success of Chicago Pile-1 in producing the chain reaction provided the first vivid demonstration of the feasibility of the military use of nuclear energy by the Allies, as well as the reality of the danger that Nazi Germany could succeed in producing nuclear weapons. Previously, estimates of critical masses had been crude calculations, leading to order-of-magnitude uncertainties about the size of a hypothetical bomb. The successful use of graphite as a moderator paved the way for progress in the Allied effort, whereas the German program languished partly because of the belief that scarce and expensive heavy water would have to be used for that purpose. The Germans had failed to account for the importance of boron and cadmium impurities in the graphite samples on which they ran their test of its usability as a moderator, while Leo Szilard and Enrico Fermi had asked suppliers about the most common contaminations of graphite after a first failed test. They consequently ensured that the next test would be run with graphite entirely devoid of them. As it turned out, both boron and cadmium were strong neutron poisons.

In 1943, CP-1 was moved to Site A, a wartime research facility near Chicago, where it was reconfigured to become Chicago Pile-2 (CP-2). There, it was operated for research until 1954, when it was dismantled and buried. The stands at Stagg Field were demolished in August 1957 and a memorial quadrangle now marks the experiment site's location, which is now a National Historic Landmark and a Chicago Landmark.

== Origins ==
The idea of a chemical chain reaction was first suggested in 1913 by the German chemist Max Bodenstein for a situation in which two molecules react to form not just the final reaction products, but also some unstable molecules that can further react with the original substances to cause more to react. The concept of a nuclear chain reaction was first hypothesized by the Hungarian scientist Leo Szilard on 12 September 1933. Szilard realized that if a nuclear reaction produced neutrons or dineutrons, which then caused further nuclear reactions, the process might be self-perpetuating. Szilard proposed using mixtures of lighter known isotopes which produced neutrons in copious amounts, and also entertained the possibility of using uranium as a fuel. He filed a patent for his idea of a simple nuclear reactor the following year. The discovery of nuclear fission by German chemists Otto Hahn and Fritz Strassmann in 1938, and its theoretical explanation (and naming) by their collaborators Lise Meitner and Otto Frisch, opened up the possibility of creating a nuclear chain reaction with uranium, but initial experiments were unsuccessful.

In order for a chain reaction to occur, fissioning uranium atoms had to emit additional neutrons to keep the reaction going. At Columbia University in New York, Italian physicist Enrico Fermi collaborated with Americans John Dunning, Herbert L. Anderson, Eugene T. Booth, G. Norris Glasoe, and Francis G. Slack to conduct the first nuclear fission experiment in the United States on 25 January 1939. Subsequent work confirmed that fast neutrons were indeed produced by fission. Szilard obtained permission from the head of the Physics Department at Columbia, George B. Pegram, to use a laboratory for three months, and he persuaded Walter Zinn to become his collaborator. They conducted a simple experiment on the seventh floor of Pupin Hall at Columbia, using a radium-beryllium source to bombard uranium with neutrons. They discovered significant neutron multiplication in natural uranium, proving that a chain reaction might be possible.

Fermi and Szilard still believed that enormous quantities of uranium would be required for an atomic bomb, and therefore concentrated on producing a controlled chain reaction. Fermi urged Alfred O. C. Nier to separate uranium isotopes for determination of the fissile component, and, on 29 February 1940, Nier separated the first uranium-235 sample, which, after being mailed to Dunning at Columbia, was confirmed to be the isolated fissile material. When he was working in Rome, Italy, Fermi had discovered that collisions between neutrons and neutron moderators can slow the neutrons, and thereby make them more likely to be captured by uranium nuclei, causing the uranium to fission. Szilard suggested to Fermi that they use carbon in the form of graphite as a moderator. As a back-up plan, he considered heavy water. This contained deuterium, which would not absorb neutrons like ordinary hydrogen, and was a better neutron moderator than carbon; but heavy water was expensive and difficult to produce, and several tons of it might be needed. Fermi estimated that a fissioning uranium nucleus produced 1.73 neutrons on average. It was enough, but a careful design was called for to minimize losses. (Today the average number of neutrons emitted per fissioning uranium-235 nucleus is known to be about 2.4).

Szilard estimated he would need about 50 short tons (45 t) of graphite and 5 short tons (4.5 t) of uranium. In December 1940, Fermi and Szilard met with Herbert G. MacPherson and Victor C. Hamister at National Carbon to discuss the possible existence of impurities in graphite, and the procurement of graphite of a purity that had never been produced commercially. National Carbon, a chemical company, had taken the then unusual step of hiring MacPherson, a physicist, to research carbon arc lamps, a major commercial use for graphite at that time. Because of his work studying the spectroscopy of the carbon arc, MacPherson knew that the major relevant contaminant was boron, both because of its concentration and its affinity for absorbing neutrons, confirming a suspicion of Szilard's. More importantly, MacPherson and Hamister believed that techniques for producing graphite of a sufficient purity could be developed. Had Fermi and Szilard not consulted MacPherson and Hamister, they might have concluded, incorrectly, as the Germans did, that graphite was unsuitable for use as a neutron moderator.

Over the next two years, MacPherson, Hamister and Lauchlin M. Currie developed thermal purification techniques for the large scale production of low boron content graphite. The resulting product was designated AGOT graphite ("Acheson Graphite Ordinary Temperature") by National Carbon. With a neutron absorption cross section of 4.97 mbarns, the AGOT graphite is considered as the first true nuclear-grade graphite. By November 1942, National Carbon had shipped 255 short tons (231 t) of AGOT graphite to the University of Chicago, where it became the primary source of graphite to be used in the construction of Chicago Pile-1.

== Government support ==
Szilard drafted a confidential letter to the U.S. president, Franklin D. Roosevelt, warning of a German nuclear weapon project, explaining the possibility of nuclear weapons, and encouraging the development of a program that could result in their creation. With the help of Eugene Wigner and Edward Teller, he approached his old friend and collaborator Albert Einstein in August 1939, and convinced him to sign the letter, lending his prestige to the proposal. The Einstein–Szilard letter resulted in the establishment of research into nuclear fission by the U.S. government. An Advisory Committee on Uranium was formed under Lyman J. Briggs, a scientist and the director of the U.S. National Bureau of Standards. Its first meeting on 21 October 1939 was attended by Szilard, Teller, and Wigner. The scientists persuaded the U.S. Army and Navy to provide $6,000 for Szilard to purchase supplies for experiments—in particular, more graphite.

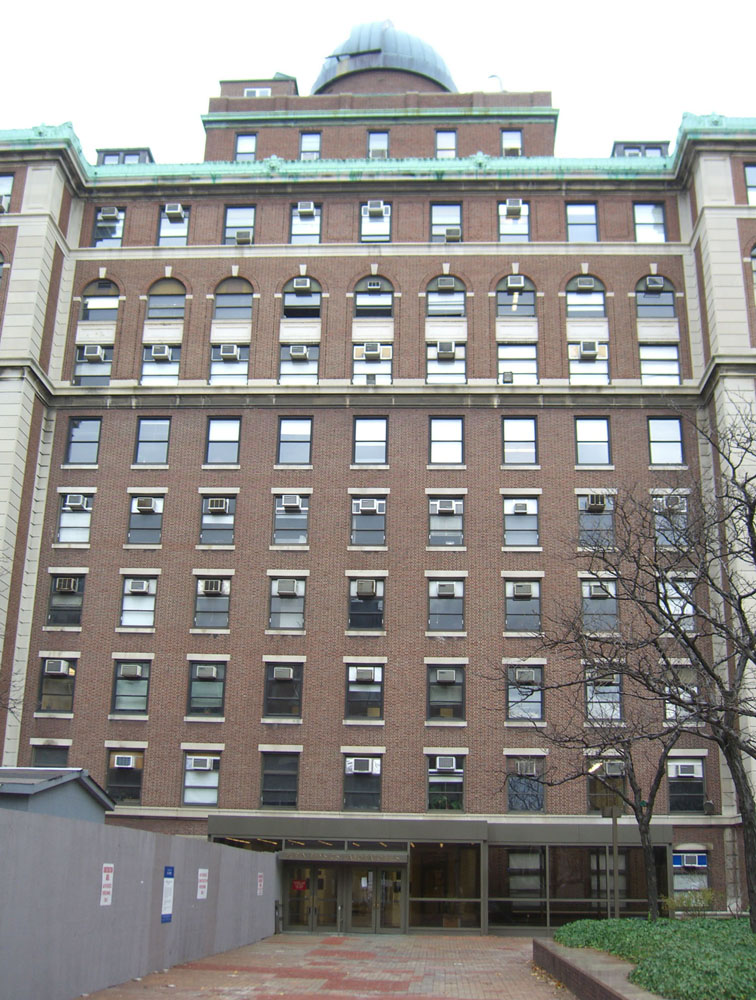
Pupin Hall at Columbia University

In April 1941, the National Defense Research Committee (NDRC) created a special project headed by Arthur Compton, a Nobel-Prize-winning physics professor at the University of Chicago, to report on the uranium program. Compton's report, submitted in May 1941, foresaw the prospects of developing radiological weapons, nuclear propulsion for ships, and nuclear weapons using uranium-235 or the recently discovered plutonium. In October, he wrote another report on the practicality of an atomic bomb. For this report, he worked with Fermi on calculations of the critical mass of uranium-235. He also discussed the prospects for uranium enrichment with Harold Urey.

Niels Bohr and John Wheeler had theorized that heavy isotopes with odd atomic mass numbers were fissile. If so, then plutonium-239 was likely to be fissile. In May 1941, Emilio Segrè and Glenn Seaborg produced 28 μg of plutonium-239 in the 60-inch (150 cm) cyclotron at the University of California, Berkeley and found that it had 1.7 times the thermal neutron capture cross section of uranium-235. At the time only such minute quantities of plutonium-239 had been produced in cyclotrons, and it was not possible to produce a sufficiently large quantity that way. Compton discussed with Wigner how plutonium might be produced in a nuclear reactor, and with Robert Serber about how that plutonium might be separated from uranium. His report, submitted in November, stated that a bomb was feasible.

The final draft of Compton's November 1941 report made no mention of plutonium, but after discussing the latest research with Ernest Lawrence, Compton became convinced that a plutonium bomb was also feasible. In December, Compton was put in charge of the plutonium project. Its objectives were to produce reactors to convert uranium to plutonium, to find ways to chemically separate the plutonium from the uranium, and to design and build an atomic bomb. It fell to Compton to decide which of the different types of reactor designs the scientists should pursue, even though a successful reactor had not yet been built. He proposed a schedule to achieve a controlled nuclear chain reaction by January 1943, and to have an atomic bomb by January 1945.

== Development ==
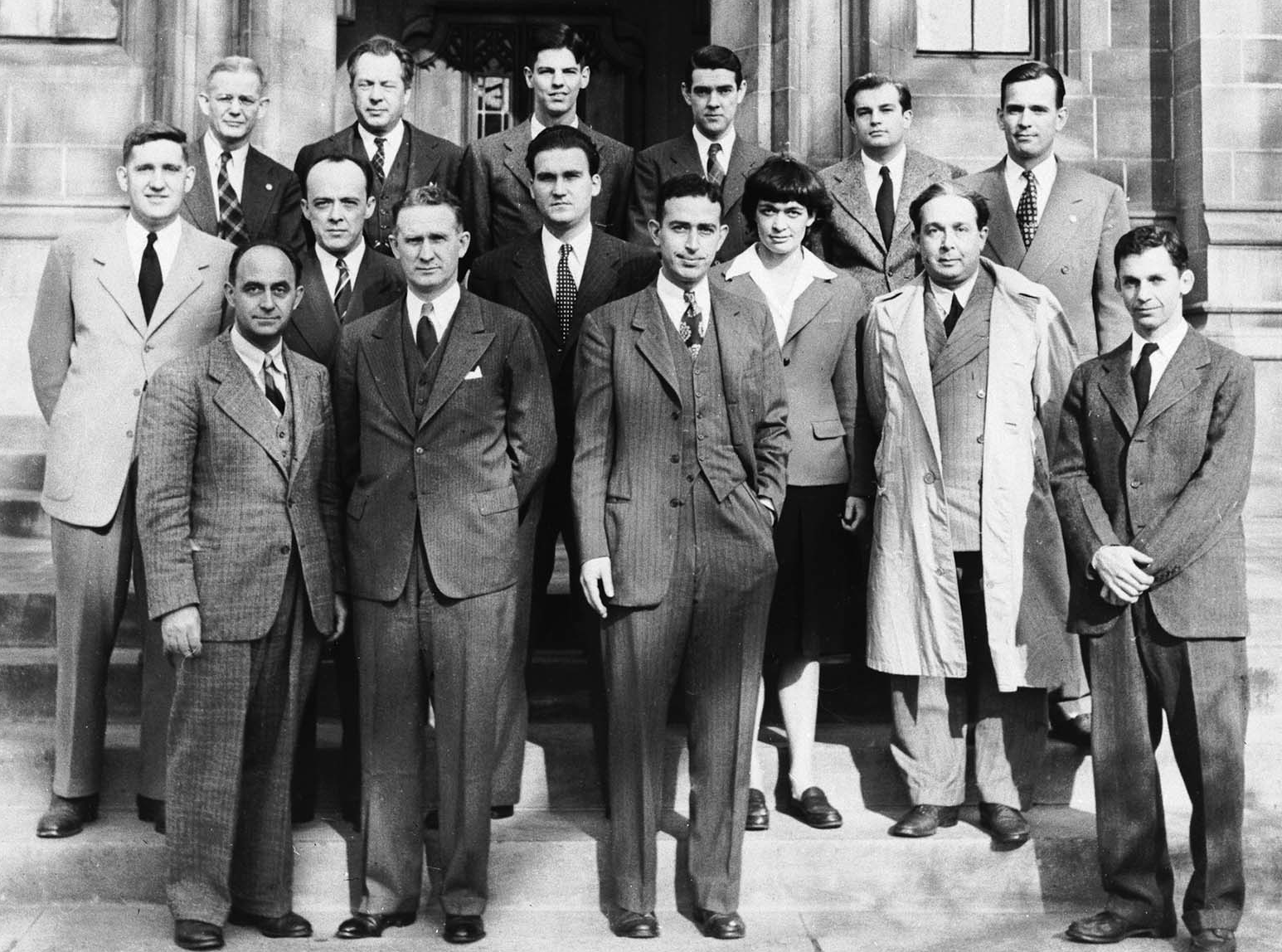
On the fourth anniversary of the team's success, 2 December 1946, members of the CP-1 team gathered at the University of Chicago. From left, Back row: Norman Hilberry, Samuel Allison, Thomas Brill, Robert Nobles, Warren Nyer, Marvin Wilkening. Middle row: Harold Agnew, William Sturm, Harold Lichtenberger, Leona Woods, Leo Szilard. Front row: Enrico Fermi, Walter Zinn, Albert Wattenberg, Herbert L. Anderson.

In a nuclear reactor, criticality is achieved when the rate of neutron production is equal to the rate of neutron losses, including both neutron absorption and neutron leakage. When a uranium-235 atom undergoes fission, it releases an average of 2.4 neutrons. In the simplest case of an unreflected, homogeneous, spherical reactor, the critical radius was calculated to be approximately:

$R_{crit} \approx \frac{\pi M}{\sqrt{k - 1}}$,

where M is the average distance that a neutron travels before it is absorbed, and k is the average neutron multiplication factor. The neutrons in succeeding reactions will be amplified by a factor k, the second generation of fission events will produce k^{2}, the third k^{3} and so on. In order for a self-sustaining nuclear chain reaction to occur, k must be at least 3 or 4 percent greater than 1. In other words, k must be greater than 1 without crossing the prompt critical threshold that would result in a rapid, exponential increase in the number of fission events.

Fermi christened his apparatus a "pile". Emilio Segrè later recalled that:

I thought for a while that this term was used to refer to a source of nuclear energy in analogy with Volta's use of the Italian term pila to denote his own great invention of a source of electrical energy. I was disillusioned by Fermi himself, who told me that he simply used the common English word pile as synonymous with heap. To my surprise, Fermi never seemed to have thought of the relationship between his pile and Volta's.

Another grant, this time of $40,000, was obtained from the S-1 Uranium Committee to purchase more materials, and in August 1941 Fermi began to plan the building of a sub-critical assembly to test with a smaller structure whether a larger one would work. The so-called exponential pile he proposed to build was 8 feet (2.4 m) long, 8 feet (2.4 m) wide and 11 feet (3.4 m) high. This was too large to fit in the Pupin Physics Laboratories. Fermi recalled that:

We went to Dean Pegram, who was then the man who could carry out magic around the University, and we explained to him that we needed a big room. He scouted around the campus and we went with him to dark corridors and under various heating pipes and so on, to visit possible sites for this experiment and eventually a big room was discovered in Schermerhorn Hall.

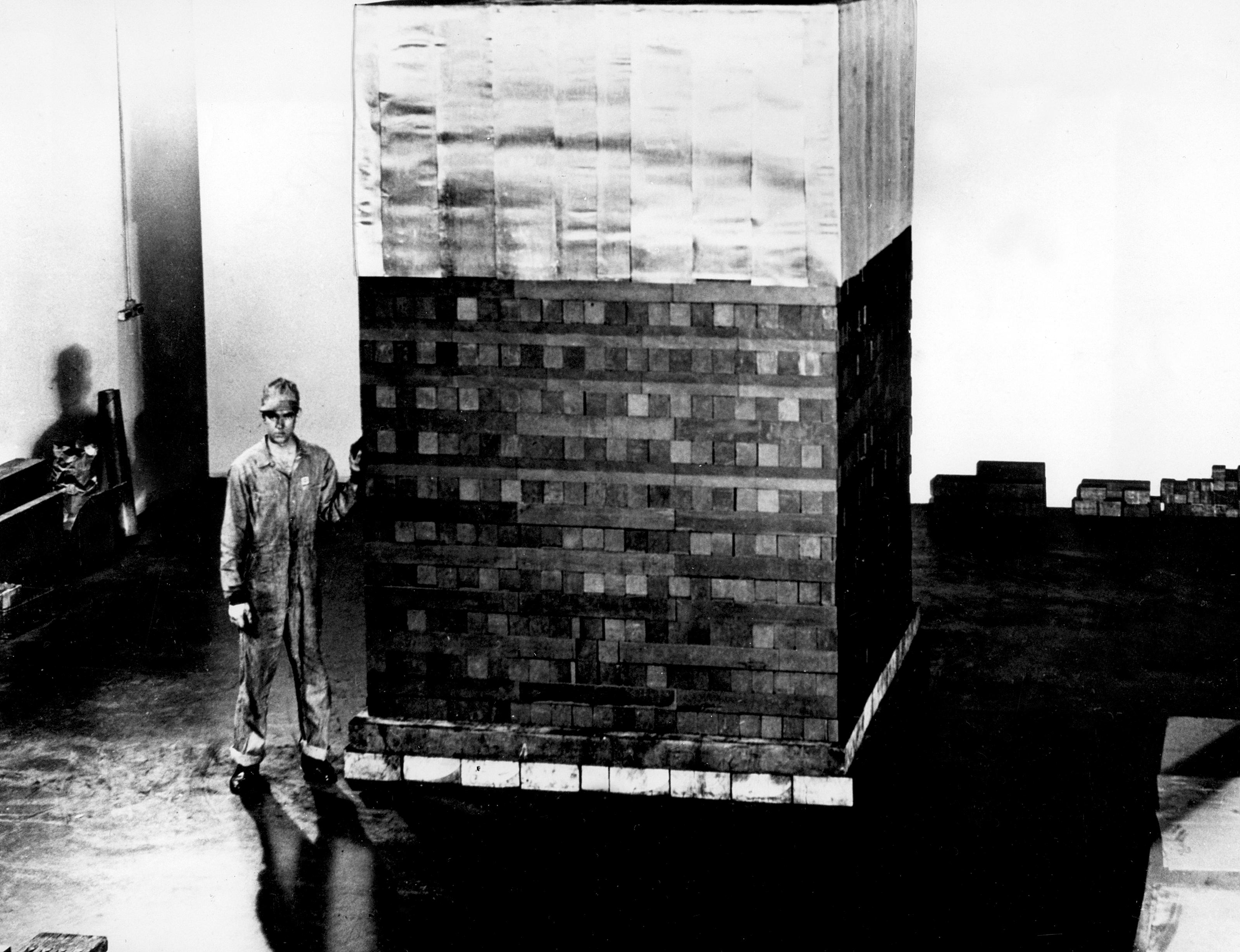
One of at least 29 experimental piles that were constructed in 1942 under the West Stands of Stagg Field. Each tested elements incorporated into the final design.

The pile was built in September 1941 from 4-by-4-by-12-inch (10 by 10 by 30 cm) graphite blocks and tinplate iron cans of uranium oxide. The cans were 8-by-8-by-8-inch (20 by 20 by 20 cm) cubes. When filled with uranium oxide, each weighed about 60 pounds (27 kg). There were 288 cans in all, and each was surrounded by graphite blocks so the whole would form a cubic lattice structure. A radium-beryllium neutron source was positioned near the bottom. The uranium oxide was heated to remove moisture, and packed into the cans while still hot on a shaking table. The cans were then soldered shut. For a workforce, Pegram secured the services of Columbia's football team. It was the custom at the time for football players to perform odd jobs around the university. They were able to manipulate the heavy cans with ease. The final result was a disappointing k of 0.87.

Compton felt that having teams at Columbia University, Princeton University, the University of Chicago and the University of California was creating too much duplication and not enough collaboration, and he resolved to concentrate the work in one location. Nobody wanted to move, and everybody argued in favor of their own location. In January 1942, soon after the United States entered World War II, Compton decided on his own location, the University of Chicago, where he knew he had the unstinting support of university administration. Chicago also had a central location, and scientists, technicians and facilities were more readily available in the Midwest, where war work had not yet taken them away. In contrast, Columbia University was engaged in uranium enrichment efforts under Harold Urey and John Dunning, and was hesitant to add a third secret project.

Before leaving for Chicago, Fermi's team made one last attempt to build a working pile at Columbia. Since the cans had absorbed neutrons, they were dispensed with. Instead, the uranium oxide, heated to 250 °C (480 °F) to dry it out, was pressed into cylindrical holes 3 inches (7.6 cm) long and 3 inches (7.6 cm) in diameter drilled into the graphite. The entire pile was then canned by soldering sheet metal around it, and the contents heated above the boiling point of water to remove moisture. The result was a k of 0.918.

== Choice of site ==
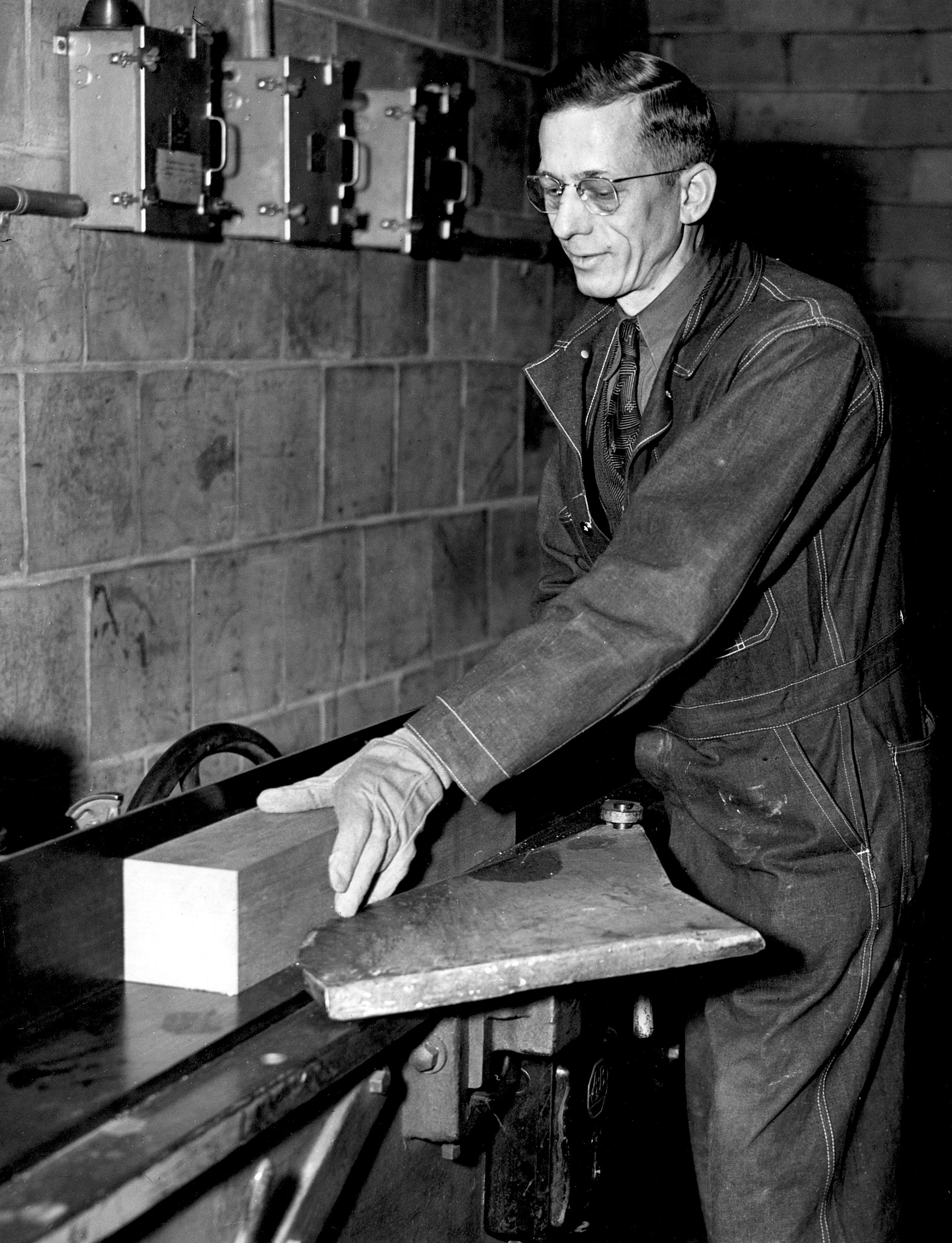
Carpenter Augustus Knuth, in the process of jointing a wooden block for the timber frame

In Chicago, Samuel K. Allison had found a suitable location 60 feet (18 m) long, 30 feet (9.1 m) wide and 26 feet (7.9 m) high, sunk slightly below ground level, in a space under the stands at Stagg Field originally built as a rackets court. Stagg Field had been largely unused since the University of Chicago had given up playing American football in 1939, but the rackets courts under West Stands were still used for playing squash and handball. Leona Woods and Anthony L. Turkevich played squash there in 1940. Since it was intended for strenuous exercise, the area was unheated, and very cold in the winter. The nearby North Stands had a pair of ice skating rinks on the ground floor, which although they were unrefrigerated, seldom melted in winter. Allison used the rackets court area to construct a 7-foot (2.1 m) experimental pile before Fermi's group arrived in 1942.

The United States Army Corps of Engineers assumed control of the nuclear weapons program in June 1942, and Compton's Metallurgical Laboratory became part of what came to be called the Manhattan Project. Brigadier General Leslie R. Groves, Jr. became director of the Manhattan Project on 23 September 1942. He visited the Metallurgical Laboratory for the first time on 5 October. Between 15 September and 15 November 1942, groups under Herbert Anderson and Walter Zinn constructed 16 experimental piles under the Stagg Field stands.

Fermi designed a new pile, which would be spherical to maximize k, which was predicted to be around 1.04, thereby achieving criticality. Leona Woods was detailed to build boron trifluoride neutron detectors as soon as she completed her doctoral thesis. She also helped Anderson locate the required large number of 4-by-6-inch (10 by 15 cm) timbers at lumber yards in Chicago's south side. Shipments of high-purity graphite arrived, mainly from National Carbon, and high-purity uranium dioxide from Mallinckrodt in St Louis, Missouri, which was now producing 30 short tons (27 t) a month. Metallic uranium also began arriving in larger quantities, the product of newly developed techniques.

On 25 June, the Army and the Office of Scientific Research and Development (OSRD) had selected a site in the Argonne Forest near Chicago for a plutonium pilot plant; this became known as "Site A". 1,025 acres (415 ha) were leased from Cook County in August, but by September it was apparent that the proposed facilities would be too extensive for the site, and it was decided to build the pilot plant elsewhere. The subcritical piles posed little danger, but Groves felt that it would be prudent to locate a critical pile—a fully functional nuclear reactor—at a more remote site. A building at Argonne to house Fermi's experimental pile was commenced, with its completion scheduled for 20 October. Due to industrial disputes, construction fell behind schedule, and it became clear the materials for Fermi's new pile would be on hand before the new structure was completed. In early November, Fermi came to Compton with a proposal to build the experimental pile under the stands at Stagg Field.

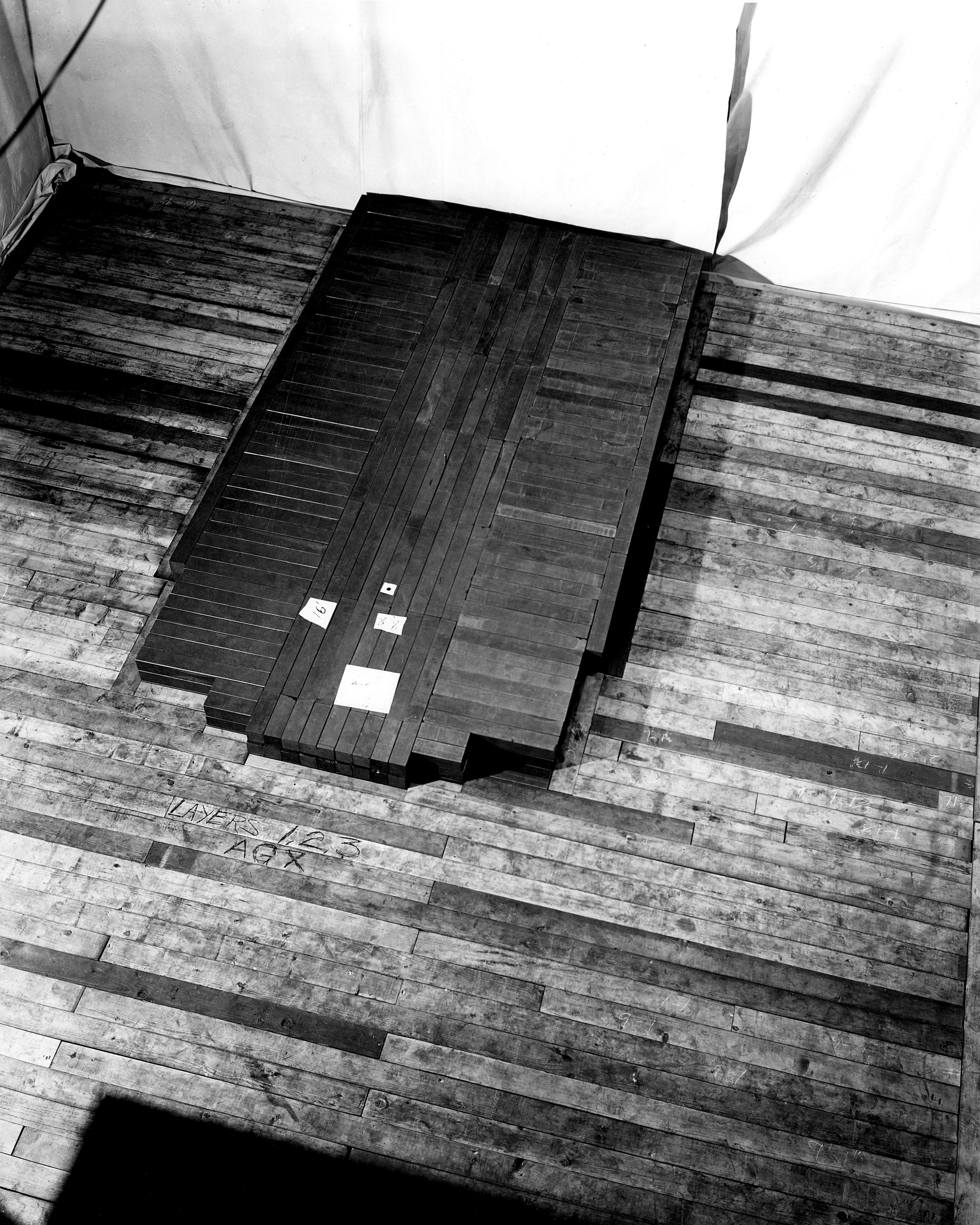
CP-1 under construction: 4th layer

The risk of building an operational reactor running at criticality in a populated area was a significant issue, as there was a danger of a catastrophic nuclear meltdown blanketing one of the United States' major urban areas in radioactive fission products. But the physics of the system suggested that the pile could be safely shut down even in the event of a runaway reaction. When a fuel atom undergoes fission, it releases neutrons that strike other fuel atoms in a chain reaction. The time between absorbing the neutron and undergoing fission is measured in nanoseconds. Szilard had noted that this reaction leaves behind fission products that may also release neutrons, but do so over much longer periods, from microseconds to as long as minutes. In a slow reaction like the one in a pile where the fission products build up, these neutrons account for about three percent of the total neutron flux.

Fermi argued that by using the delayed neutrons, and by carefully controlling the reaction rates as the power is ramped up, a pile can reach criticality at fission rates slightly below that of a chain reaction relying solely on the prompt neutrons from the fission reactions. Since the rate of release of these neutrons depends on fission events taking place some time earlier, there is a delay between any power spikes and the later criticality event. This time gives the operators leeway; if a spike in the prompt neutron flux is seen, they have several minutes before this causes a runaway reaction. If a neutron absorber, or neutron poison, is injected at any time during this period, the reactor will shut down. Consequently, the reaction can be controlled with electromechanical control systems such as control rods. Compton felt this delay was enough to provide a critical margin of safety, and allowed Fermi to build Chicago Pile-1 at Stagg Field.

Compton later explained that:

As a responsible officer of the University of Chicago, according to every rule of organizational protocol, I should have taken the matter to my superior. But this would have been unfair. President Hutchins was in no position to make an independent judgment of the hazards involved. Based on considerations of the University's welfare, the only answer he could have given would have been—no. And this answer would have been wrong.

Compton informed Groves of his decision at the 14 November meeting of the S-1 Executive Committee. Although Groves "had serious misgivings about the wisdom of Compton's suggestion", he did not interfere. James B. Conant, the chairman of the NDRC, was reported to have turned white. But because of the urgency and their confidence in Fermi's calculations, no one objected.

== Construction ==
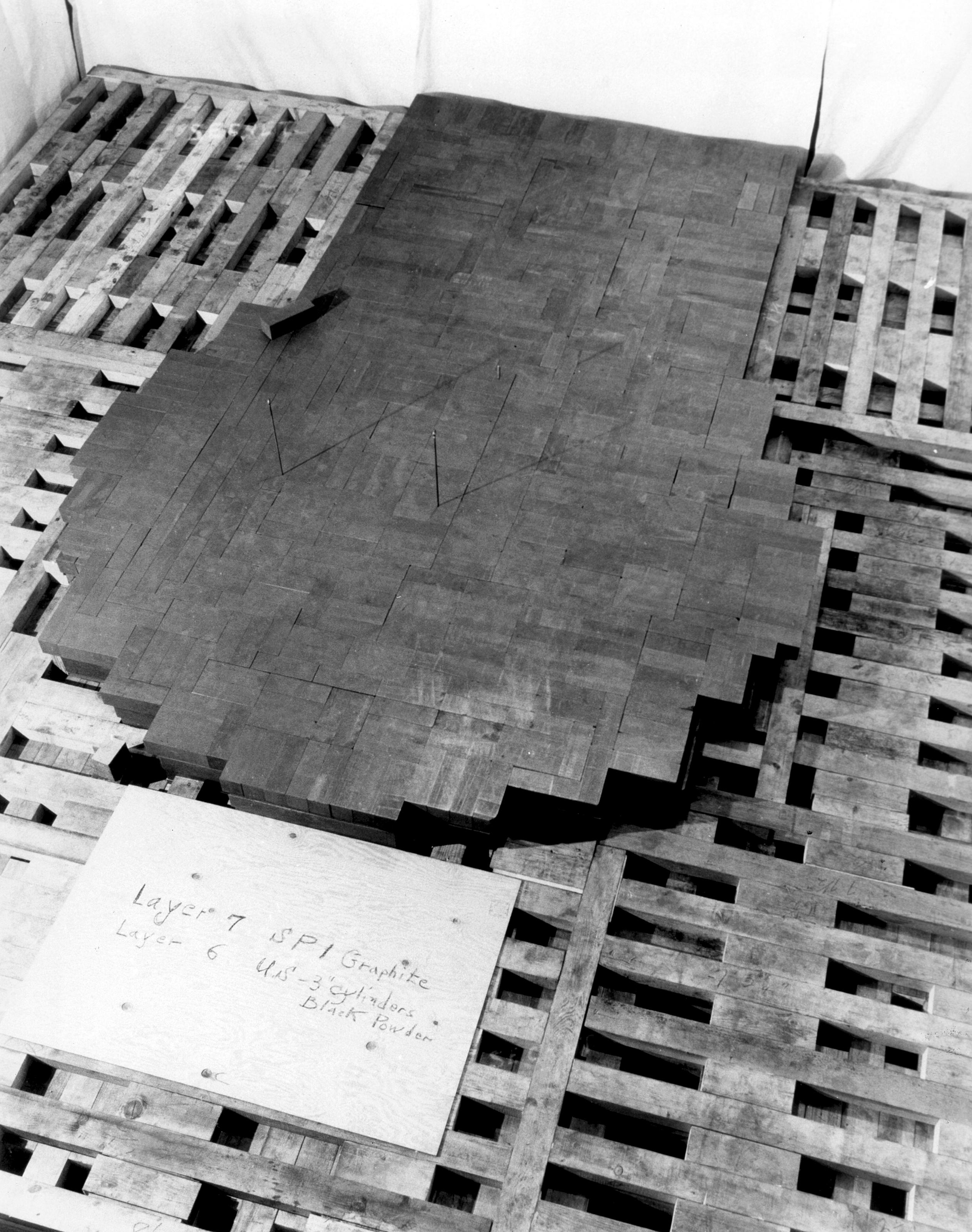
CP-1 under construction: seventh layer

Chicago Pile-1 was encased within a balloon so that the air inside could be replaced by carbon dioxide. Anderson had a dark gray balloon manufactured by Goodyear Tire and Rubber Company. A 25-foot (7.6 m) cube-shaped balloon was somewhat unusual, but the Manhattan Project's AAA priority rating ensured prompt delivery with no questions asked. A block and tackle was used to haul it into place, with the top secured to the ceiling and three sides to the walls. The remaining side, the one facing the balcony from which Fermi directed the operation, was furled like an awning. A circle was drawn on the floor, and the stacking of graphite blocks began on the morning of 16 November 1942. The first layer placed was made up entirely of graphite blocks, with no uranium. Layers without uranium were alternated with two layers containing uranium, so the uranium was enclosed in graphite. Unlike later reactors, it had no radiation shielding or cooling system, as it was only intended to be operated at very low power.

The work was carried out in twelve-hour shifts, with a day shift under Zinn and a night shift under Anderson. For a work force they hired thirty high school dropouts who were eager to earn a bit of money before being drafted into the military. They machined 45,000 graphite blocks enclosing 19,000 pieces of uranium metal and uranium oxide. The graphite arrived from the manufacturers in 4.25-by-4.25-inch (10.8 by 10.8 cm) bars of various lengths. They were cut into standard lengths of 16.5 inches (42 cm), each weighing 19 pounds (8.6 kg). A lathe was used to drill 3.25-inch (8.3 cm) holes in the blocks for the control rods and the uranium. A hydraulic press was used to shape the uranium oxide into "pseudospheres", cylinders with rounded ends. Drill bits had to be sharpened after each 60 holes, which worked out to be about once an hour. Graphite dust soon filled the air and made the floor slippery.

Another group, under Volney C. Wilson, was responsible for instrumentation. They also fabricated the control rods, which were cadmium sheets nailed to flat wooden strips, cadmium being a potent neutron absorber, and the scram line, a manila rope that when cut would drop a control rod into the pile and stop the reaction. Richard Fox, who made the control-rod mechanism for the pile, remarked that the manual speed control that the operator had over the rods was simply a variable resistor, controlling an electric motor that would spool the clothesline wire over a pulley that also had two lead weights attached to ensure it would fail-safe and return to its zero position when released.

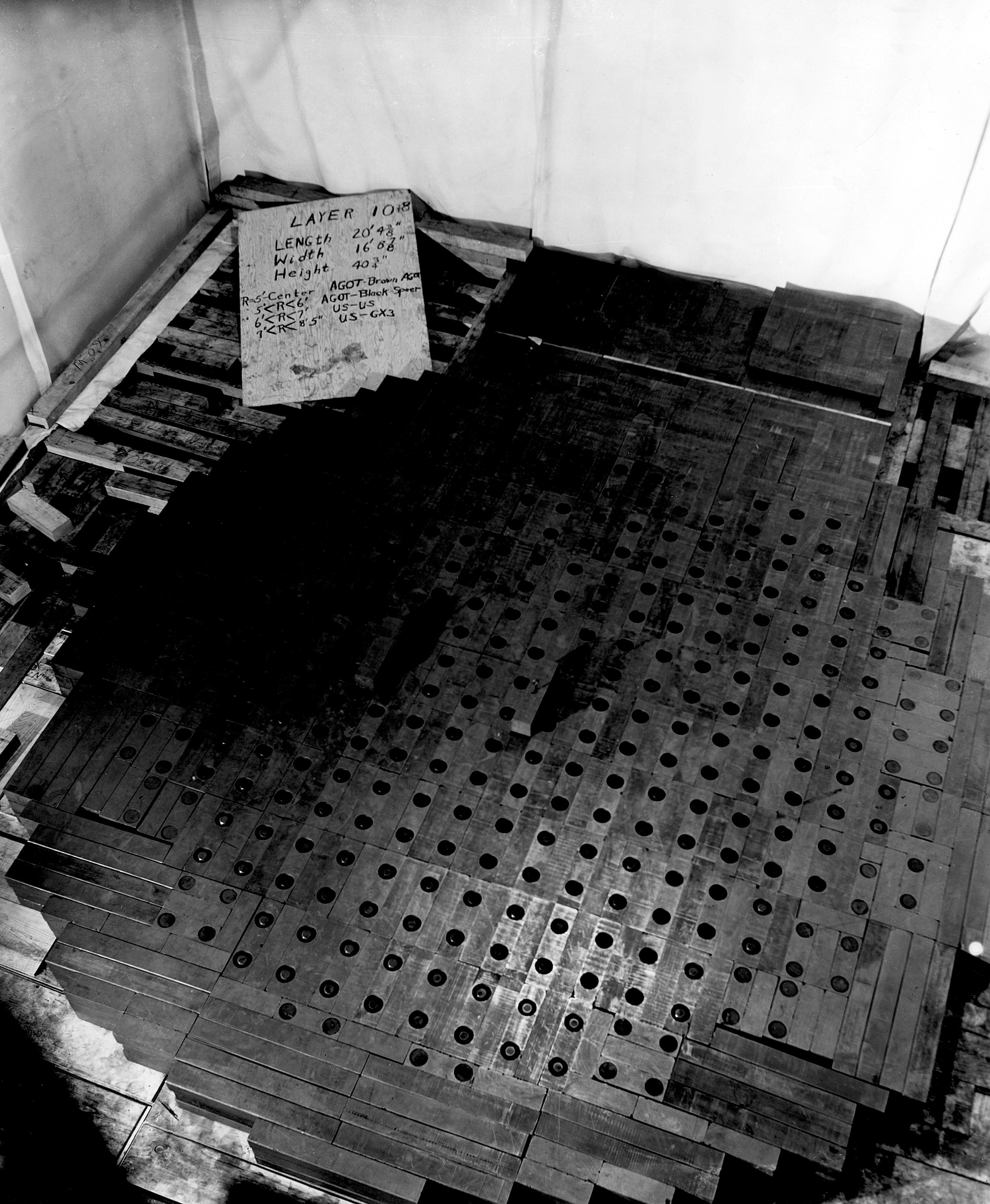
CP-1 under construction: 10th layer

About two layers were laid per shift. Woods' boron trifluoride neutron counter was inserted at the 15th layer. Thereafter, readings were taken at the end of each shift. Fermi divided the square of the radius of the pile by the intensity of the radioactivity to obtain a metric that counted down to one as the pile approached criticality. At the 15th layer, it was 390; at the 19th it was 320; at the 25th it was 270 and by the 36th it was only 149. The original design was for a spherical pile, but as work proceeded, it became clear that this would not be necessary. The new graphite was purer, and 6 short tons (5.4 t) of very pure metallic uranium began to arrive from the Ames Project at Iowa State University, where Harley Wilhelm and his team had developed a new process to produce uranium metal. Westinghouse Lamp Plant supplied 3 short tons (2.7 t), which it produced in a rush with a makeshift process.

The 2.25-inch (5.7 cm) metallic uranium cylinders, known as "Spedding's eggs", were dropped in the holes in the graphite in lieu of the uranium oxide pseudospheres. The process of filling the balloon with carbon dioxide would not be necessary, and twenty layers could be dispensed with. According to Fermi's new calculations, the countdown would reach 1 between the 56th and 57th layers. The resulting pile was therefore flatter on the top than on the bottom. Anderson called a halt after the 57th layer was placed. When completed, the wooden frame supported an elliptical-shaped structure, 20 feet (6.1 m) high, 6 feet (1.8 m) wide at the ends and 25 feet (7.6 m) across the middle. It contained 6 short tons (5.4 t) of uranium metal, 50 short tons (45 t) of uranium oxide and 400 short tons (360 t) of graphite, at an estimated cost of $2.7 million. According to Robert Crease, CP-1 and preceding piles were "the largest unbonded masonry structures since the pyramids."

== First nuclear chain reaction ==
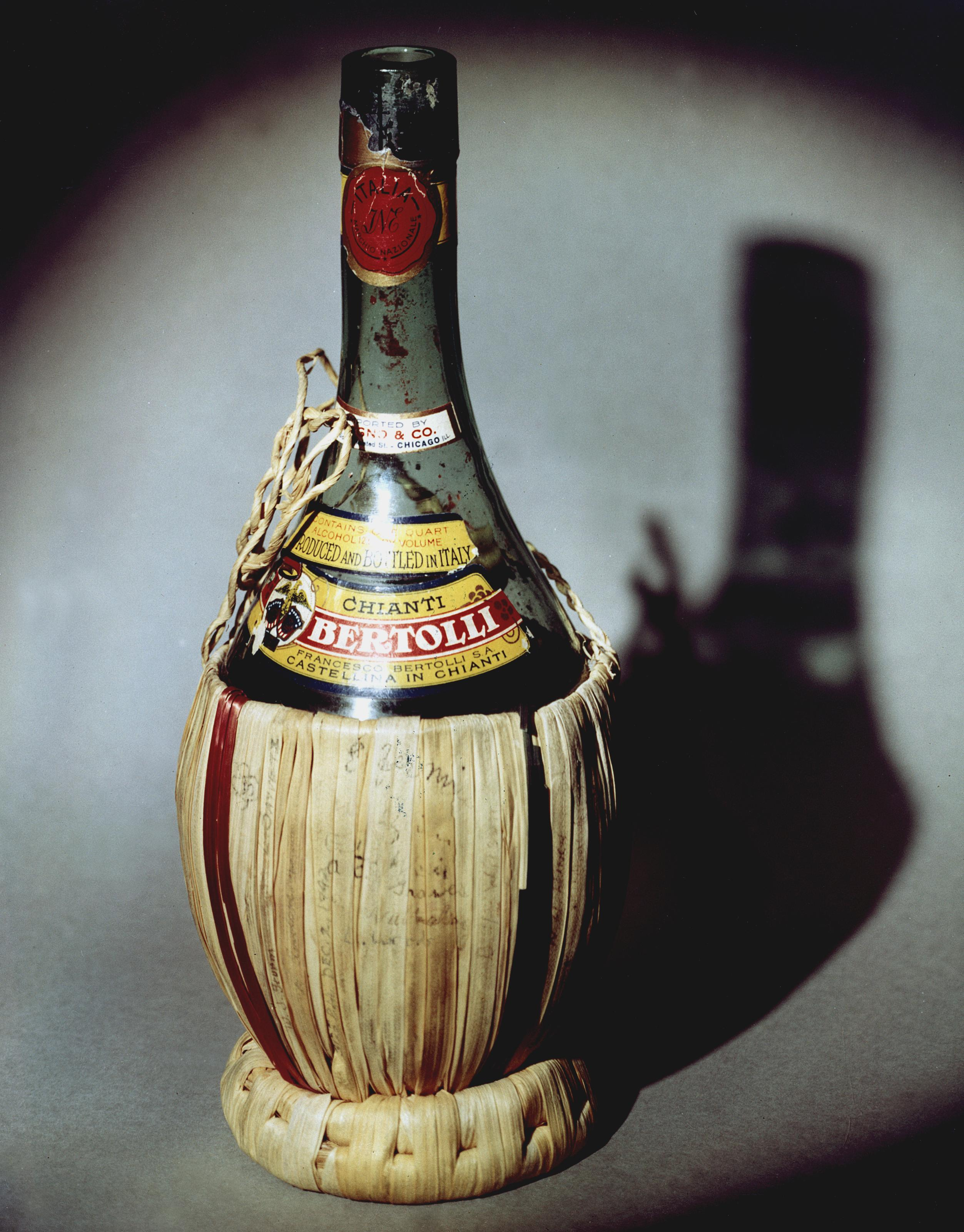
The fiasco of Chianti wine purchased by Eugene Wigner to help celebrate the first self-sustaining, controlled chain reaction. It was signed by the participants.

The next day, 2 December 1942, everybody assembled for the experiment. There were 49 scientists present. (Note: The Chicago Pile 1 Pioneers were: Harold Agnew, Herbert L. Anderson, Wayne Arnold, Hugh M. Barton, Thomas Brill, Robert F. Christy, Arthur H. Compton, Enrico Fermi, Richard J. Fox, Stewart Fox, Carl C. Gamertsfelder, Alvin C. Graves, Crawford Greenewalt, Norman Hilberry, David L. Hill, William H. Hinch, Robert E. Johnson, W.R. Kanne, August C. Knuth, Phillip Grant Koontz, Herbert E. Kubitschek, Harold V. Lichtenberger, George M. Maronde, Anthony J. Matz, George Miller, George D. Monk, Henry P. Newson, Robert G. Nobles, Warren E. Nyer, Wilcox P. Overbeck, J. Howard Parsons, Gerard S. Pawlicki, Theodore Petry, David P. Rudolph, Leon Sayvetz, Leo Seren, Louis Slotin, Frank Spedding, William J. Sturm, Leo Szilard, Albert Wattenberg, Richard J. Watts, George Weil, Eugene P. Wigner, Marvin H. Wilkening, Volney C. (Bill) Wilson, Leona Woods and Walter Zinn.) Although most of the S-1 Executive Committee was in Chicago, only Crawford Greenewalt was present, at Compton's invitation. Other dignitaries present included Szilard, Wigner and Spedding. Fermi, Compton, Anderson and Zinn gathered around the controls on the balcony, which was originally intended as a viewing platform. Samuel Allison stood ready with a bucket of concentrated cadmium nitrate, which he was to throw over the pile in the event of an emergency. The startup began at 09:54. Walter Zinn removed the zip, the emergency control rod, and secured it. Norman Hilberry stood ready with an axe to cut the scram line, which would allow the zip to fall under the influence of gravity. While Leona Woods called out the count from the boron trifluoride detector in a loud voice, George Weil, the only one on the floor, withdrew all but one of the control rods. At 10:37 Fermi ordered Weil to remove all but 13 feet (4.0 m) of the last control rod. Weil withdrew it 6 inches (15 cm) at a time, with measurements being taken at each step.

The process was abruptly halted by the automatic control rod reinserting itself, due to its trip level being set too low. At 11:25, Fermi ordered the control rods reinserted. He then announced that it was lunchtime.

The experiment resumed at 14:00. Weil removed the final control rod while Fermi carefully monitored the neutron activity. Fermi announced that the pile had gone critical (reached a self-sustaining reaction) at 15:25. Fermi switched the scale on the recorder to accommodate the rapidly increasing electric current from the boron trifluoride detector. He wanted to test the control circuits, but after 28 minutes, the alarm bells went off to notify everyone that the neutron flux had passed the preset safety level, and he ordered Zinn to release the zip. The reaction rapidly halted. The pile had run for about 4.5 minutes at about 0.5 watts. Wigner opened a bottle of Chianti, which they drank from paper cups.

Compton notified Conant by telephone. The conversation was in an impromptu code:

Compton: The Italian navigator has landed in the New World.

Conant: How were the natives?

Compton: Very friendly.

== Later operation ==
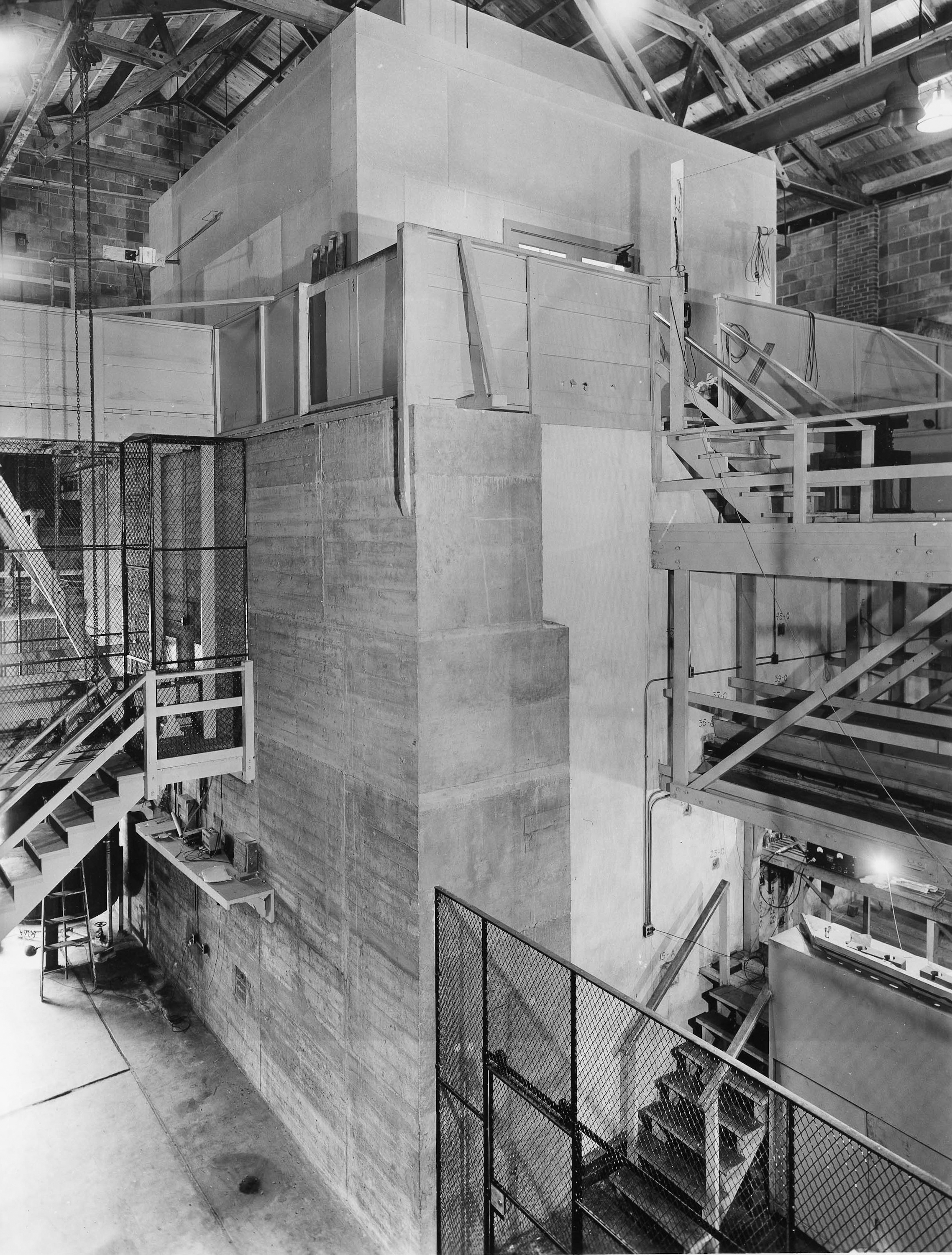
Chicago Pile-1 was rebuilt at Site A, given a large concrete radiation shield, and renamed Chicago Pile-2.

On 12 December 1942, CP-1's power output was increased to 200 W. Lacking shielding of any kind, it was a radiation hazard for everyone in the vicinity, and further testing was continued at 0.5 W. Operation was terminated on 28 February 1943, and the pile was dismantled and moved to Site A in the Argonne Forest, now known as Red Gate Woods. There the original materials were used to build Chicago Pile-2 (CP-2). Instead of being spherical, the new reactor was built in a cube-like shape, about 25 feet (7.6 m) tall with a base approximately 30 feet (9.1 m) square. It was surrounded by concrete walls 5 feet (1.5 m) thick that acted as a radiation shielding, with overhead protection from 6 inches (15 cm) of lead and 50 inches (130 cm) of wood. More uranium was used, so it contained 52 short tons (47 t) of uranium and 472 short tons (428 t) of graphite. No cooling system was provided as it only ran at a few kilowatts. CP-2 became operational in March 1943, with a k of 1.055. During the war, Walter Zinn allowed CP-2 to be run around the clock, and its design was suitable for conducting experiments. CP-2 was joined by Chicago Pile-3, the first heavy water reactor, which went critical on 15 May 1944.

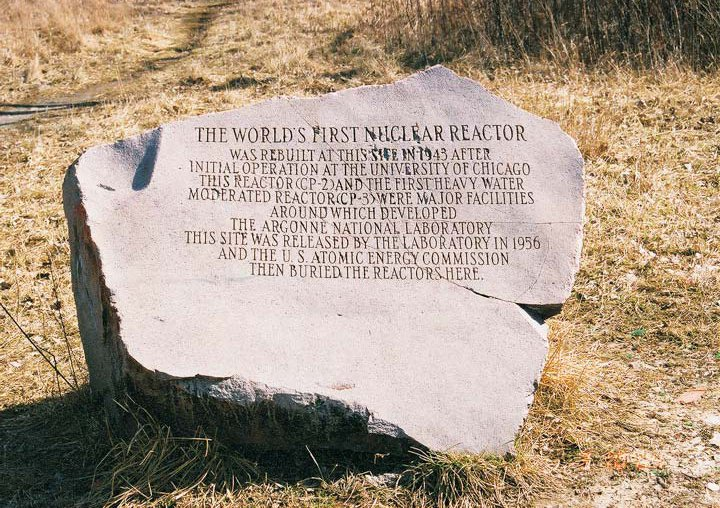
Commemorative boulder at Site A

The reactors were used to undertake research related to weapons, such as investigations of the properties of tritium. Wartime experiments included measuring the neutron absorption cross-section of elements and compounds. Albert Wattenberg recalled that about 10 elements were studied each month, and 75 over the course of a year. An accident involving radium and beryllium powder caused a dangerous drop in his white blood cell count that lasted for three years. As the dangers of things such as inhaling uranium oxide became more apparent, experiments were conducted on the effects of radioactive substances on laboratory test animals.

Though the design was held secret for a decade, Szilard and Fermi jointly patented it, with an initial filing date of 19 December 1944 as the neutronic reactor no. 2,708,656.

The Red Gate Woods later became the original site of Argonne National Laboratory, which replaced the Metallurgical Laboratory on 1 July 1946, with Zinn as its first director. CP-2 and CP-3 operated for ten years before they outlived their usefulness, and Zinn ordered them shut down on 15 May 1954. Their remaining usable fuel was transferred to Chicago Pile-5 at the Argonne National Laboratory's new site in DuPage County, and the CP-2 and CP-3 reactors were dismantled in 1955 and 1956. Some of the graphite blocks from CP-1/CP-2 were reused in the reflector of the TREAT reactor. High-level nuclear waste such as fuel and heavy water were shipped to Oak Ridge, Tennessee, for disposal. The rest was encased in concrete and buried in a 40-foot-deep (12 m) trench in what is now known as the Site A/Plot M Disposal Site. It is marked by a commemorative boulder.

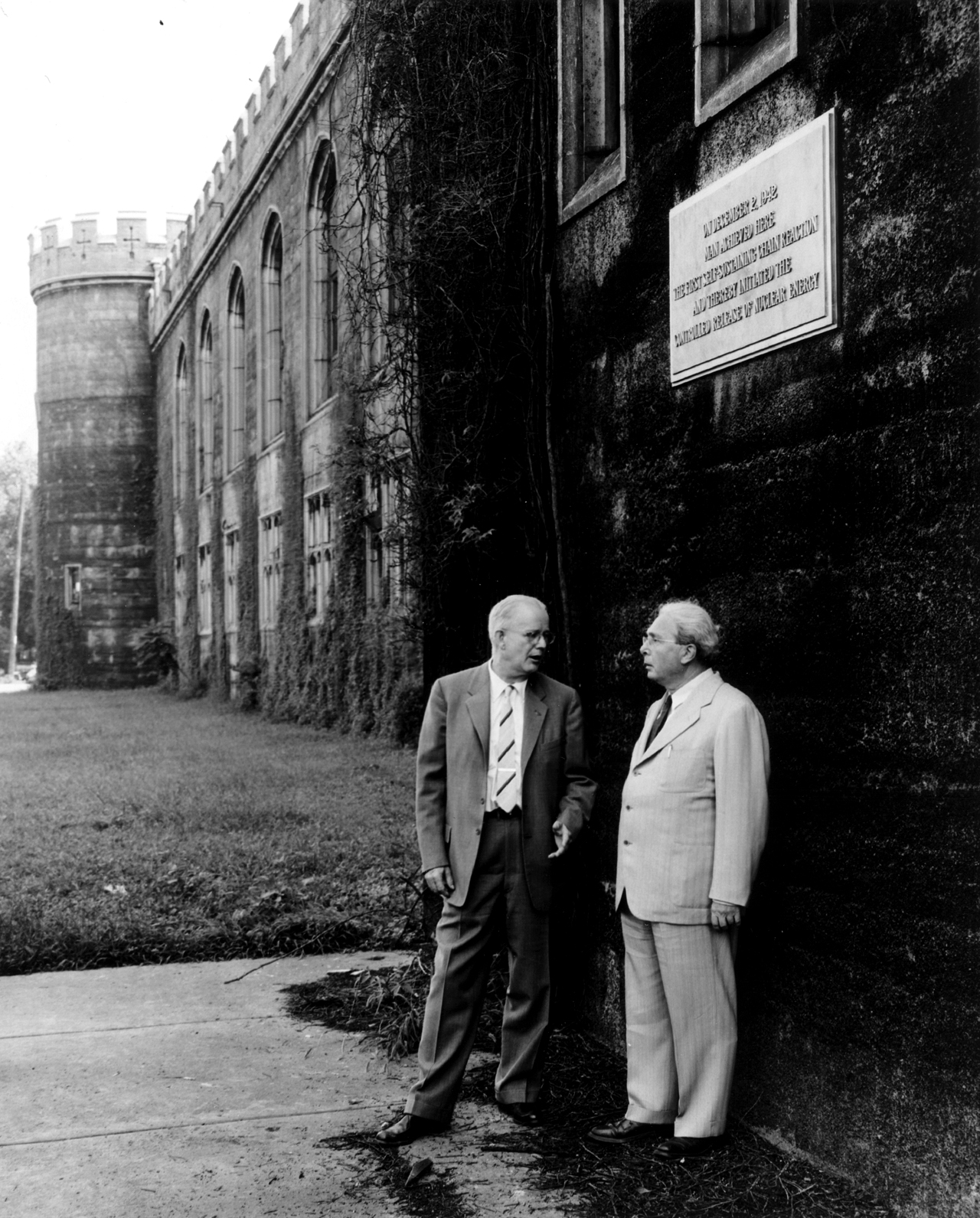
Leo Szilard (right) and Norman Hilberry under the plaque commemorating Chicago Pile-1 on the West Stands of Old Stagg Field. While the stands were later demolished, the plaque is now located at the site memorial.

By the 1970s, there was increased public concern about the levels of radioactivity at the site, which was used for recreation by local residents. Surveys conducted in the 1980s found strontium-90 in the soil at Plot M, trace amounts of tritium in nearby wells, and plutonium, technetium, caesium, and uranium in the area. In 1994, the United States Department of Energy and the Argonne National Laboratory yielded to public pressure and earmarked $24.7 million and $3.4 million respectively to rehabilitate the site. As part of the cleanup, 500 cubic yards (380 m^{3}) of radioactive waste were removed and sent to the Hanford Site for disposal. By 2002, the Illinois Department of Public Health had determined that the remaining materials posed no danger to public health.

== Significance and commemoration ==
The successful test of CP-1 not only proved that a nuclear reactor was feasible, it demonstrated that the k factor was larger than originally thought. This removed the objections to the use of air or water as a coolant rather than expensive helium. It also meant that there was greater latitude in the choice of materials for coolant pipes and control mechanisms. Wigner now pressed ahead with his design for a water-cooled production reactor. There remained concerns about the ability of a graphite-moderated reactor being able to produce plutonium on an industrial scale, and for this reason the Manhattan Project continued the P-9 heavy water production program. An air-cooled reactor, the X-10 Graphite Reactor, was built at the Clinton Engineer Works in Oak Ridge, Tennessee, as part of a plutonium semiworks, followed by larger water-cooled production reactors at the Hanford Site in Washington state. Enough plutonium was produced for an atomic bomb by July 1945, and for two more in August.

A commemorative plaque was unveiled at Stagg Field on 2 December 1952, the occasion of the tenth anniversary of CP-1 going critical. It read as follows:

On December 2, 1942 man achieved here the first self-sustaining chain reaction and thereby initiated the controlled release of nuclear energy.

The plaque was saved when the West Stands were demolished in August 1957. The site of CP-1 was designated as a National Historic Landmark on 18 February 1965. When the National Register of Historic Places was created in 1966, it was immediately added to that as well. The site was also named a Chicago Landmark on 27 October 1971.

Today, the site of the old Stagg Field is occupied by the university's Regenstein Library, which was opened in 1970, and the Joe and Rika Mansueto Library, which was opened in 2011. A Henry Moore sculpture, Nuclear Energy, stands in a small quadrangle outside the Regenstein Library on the former site of the west viewing stands' rackets court. It was dedicated on 2 December 1967, to commemorate the 25th anniversary of CP-1 going critical. The commemorative plaques from 1952, 1965 and 1967 are nearby. A graphite block from CP-1 can be seen at the Bradbury Science Museum in Los Alamos, New Mexico; another is on display at the Museum of Science and Industry in Chicago. On 2 December 2017, the 75th anniversary, the Massachusetts Institute of Technology in restoring a research-graphite pile, similar in design to Chicago Pile-1, ceremonially inserted the final uranium slugs.

== See also ==
- List of Chicago Landmarks
- List of National Historic Landmarks in Illinois
- National Register of Historic Places listings in South Side Chicago
