= Stanisław Mrozowski =

Stanisław Wojciech Mrozowski (February 9, 1902 – February 21, 1999) was a Polish-born American physicist. He was a professor of physics at SUNY Buffalo from 1949 until 1972, after which he worked at Ball State University. He worked briefly on the Manhattan Project at Princeton University. He received the Kosciuszko Medal in 1991 and the Officer's Cross of the Polonia Restituta Cross in 1993.

He has been called one of "the most often published and cited physicist of interwar Poland".
