= Walter Zinn =

Nuclear physicist (1906–2000)

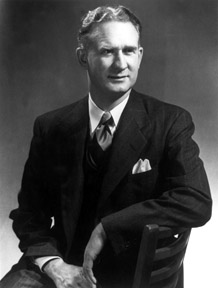
- Born: December 10, 1906; Berlin, Ontario
- Died: February 14, 2000 (aged 93); Safety Harbor, Florida
- Citizenship: Canadian; American
- Education: Queen's University (BA, 1927; MA, 1930); Columbia University (PhD, 1934)
- Awards: Atoms for Peace Award (1960); Enrico Fermi Award (1969); Elliott Cresson Medal (1970)
- Scientific career
- Fields: Nuclear physics
- Workplaces: University of Chicago Metallurgical Laboratory; Manhattan Project
- Thesis: Two-Crystal Study of the Structure and Width of K X-Ray Absorption Limits (1934)

Walter Henry Zinn (December 10, 1906 – February 14, 2000) was a Canadian-born American nuclear physicist who was the first director of the Argonne National Laboratory from 1946 to 1956. He worked at the Manhattan Project's Metallurgical Laboratory during World War II, and supervised the construction of Chicago Pile-1, the world's first nuclear reactor, which went critical on December 2, 1942, at the University of Chicago. At Argonne he designed and built several new reactors, including Experimental Breeder Reactor I, the first nuclear reactor to electrically power a building, which went live on December 20, 1951.

== Early life ==
Walter Henry Zinn was born in Berlin (now Kitchener), Ontario, on December 10, 1906, the son of John Zinn, who worked in a tire factory, and Maria Anna Stoskopf. He had an older brother, Albert, who also became a factory worker.

Zinn entered Queen's University, where he earned a Bachelor of Arts degree in mathematics in 1927 and a Master of Arts degree in 1930. He then entered Columbia University in 1930, where he studied physics, writing his Doctor of Philosophy thesis on "Two-crystal study of the structure and width of K X-ray absorption limits". This was subsequently published in the Physical Review.

To support himself, Zinn taught at Queen's University from 1927 to 1928, and at Columbia from 1931 to 1932. He became an instructor at the City College of New York in 1932. While at Queen's he met Jennie A. (Jean) Smith, a fellow student. They were married in 1933 and had two sons, John Eric and Robert James. In 1938, Zinn became a naturalised United States citizen.

== Manhattan Project ==
In 1939, the Pupin Physics Laboratories at Columbia where Zinn worked were the center of intensive research into the properties of uranium and nuclear fission, which had recently been discovered by Lise Meitner, Otto Hahn and Fritz Strassmann. At Columbia, Zinn, Enrico Fermi, Herbert L. Anderson, John R. Dunning and Leo Szilard investigated whether uranium-238 fissioned with slow neutrons, as Fermi believed, or only the uranium-235 isotope, as Niels Bohr contended. Since pure uranium-235 was not available, Fermi and Szilard chose to work with natural uranium. They were particularly interested in whether a nuclear chain reaction could be initiated. This would require more than one neutron to be emitted per fission on average in order to keep the chain reaction going. By March 1939, they established that about two were being emitted per fission on average. The delay between an atom absorbing a neutron and fission occurring would be the key to controlling a chain reaction.

At this point Zinn began working for Fermi, constructing experimental uranium lattices. To slow neutrons down requires a neutron moderator. Water was Fermi's first choice, but it tended to absorb neutrons as well as slow them. In July, Szilard suggested using carbon, in the form of graphite. The critical radius of a spherical reactor was calculated to be:

$$R_{crit} = - \frac{\pi M}{\sqrt{k - 1}}$$

In order for a self-sustaining nuclear chain reaction to occur, they needed k > 1. For a practical reactor configuration, it needed to be at least 3 or 4 percent more; but in August 1941 Zinn's initial experiments indicated a disappointing value of 0.87. Fermi pinned his hopes of a better result on an improved configuration, and purer uranium and graphite.

In early 1942, with the United States now embroiled World War II, Arthur Compton concentrated the Manhattan Project's various teams working on plutonium at the Metallurgical Laboratory at the University of Chicago. Zinn used athletes to build Fermi's increasingly large experimental configurations under the stands of the disused Stagg Field. In July 1942, Fermi measured a k = 1.007 from a uranium oxide lattice. This raised hopes that pure uranium would yield a suitable value of k.

By December 1942, Zinn and Anderson had the new configuration ready at Stagg Field. Some 24 feet (7.3 m) long, 24 feet (7.3 m) wide and 19 feet (5.8 m) high, it contained 385.5 long tons (391.7 t) of graphite and 46.5 long tons (47.2 t) of uranium metal and uranium oxide. When the experiment was carried out on the afternoon of December 2, 1942, the reactor, known as Chicago Pile-1, reached criticality without incident. Since the reactor had no radiation shield, it was run at a maximum power of only 200 W, enough to power a light bulb (but it didn't include an electric generator), and ran for only three months. It was shut down on February 28, 1943, because the US Army did not want to risk an accident near densely populated downtown Chicago.

The Army leased a 1,000 acres (400 ha) of the Cook County Forest Preserves known as "Site A" to the Manhattan Project, and "the Country Club" to the hundred or so scientists, guards and others who worked there. Zinn was placed in charge of Site A, under Fermi. Chicago Pile-1 was disassembled and rebuilt, this time with a radiation shield, at Site A. The reactor, now known as Chicago Pile-2, was operational again on March 20, 1943. Within a few months, Fermi began designing a new reactor, which became known as Chicago Pile-3. This was a very different type of reactor. It was much smaller, being only 6 feet (1.8 m) in diameter and 9 feet (2.7 m) high. It was power by 120 uranium metal rods, and moderated by 1,200 US gallons (4,500 L; 1,000 imp gal) of heavy water. Once again Zinn was in charge of construction, which commenced on New Year's Day in 1944. Chicago Pile-3 went critical on May 15, 1944, and commenced operation on June 23 at its full power of 300 KW. When Fermi departed for the Hanford Site, Zinn became the sole authority at Site A.

On September 29, 1944, Zinn received an urgent call from Samuel Allison, the director of the Metallurgical Laboratory. The B Reactor at Hanford had shut down shortly after reaching full power, only to come back to life again some hours later. Norman Hilberry suspected a neutron poison was responsible. If so, it had a half-life of around 9.7 hours. Xenon-135 had a half-life close to that, but had not been detected in Argonne or by the X-10 Graphite Reactor in Oak Ridge, Tennessee. Zinn quickly brought Chicago Pile-3 up to full power, and within twelve hours, had made a series of measurements that confirmed the Hanford results.

Over the following months, some 175 technical personnel were transferred from the Metallurgical Laboratory to Hanford and Los Alamos. Zinn's Argonne Laboratory was reduced to a skeleton staff, but Compton would not countenance its closure.

== Argonne National Laboratory ==
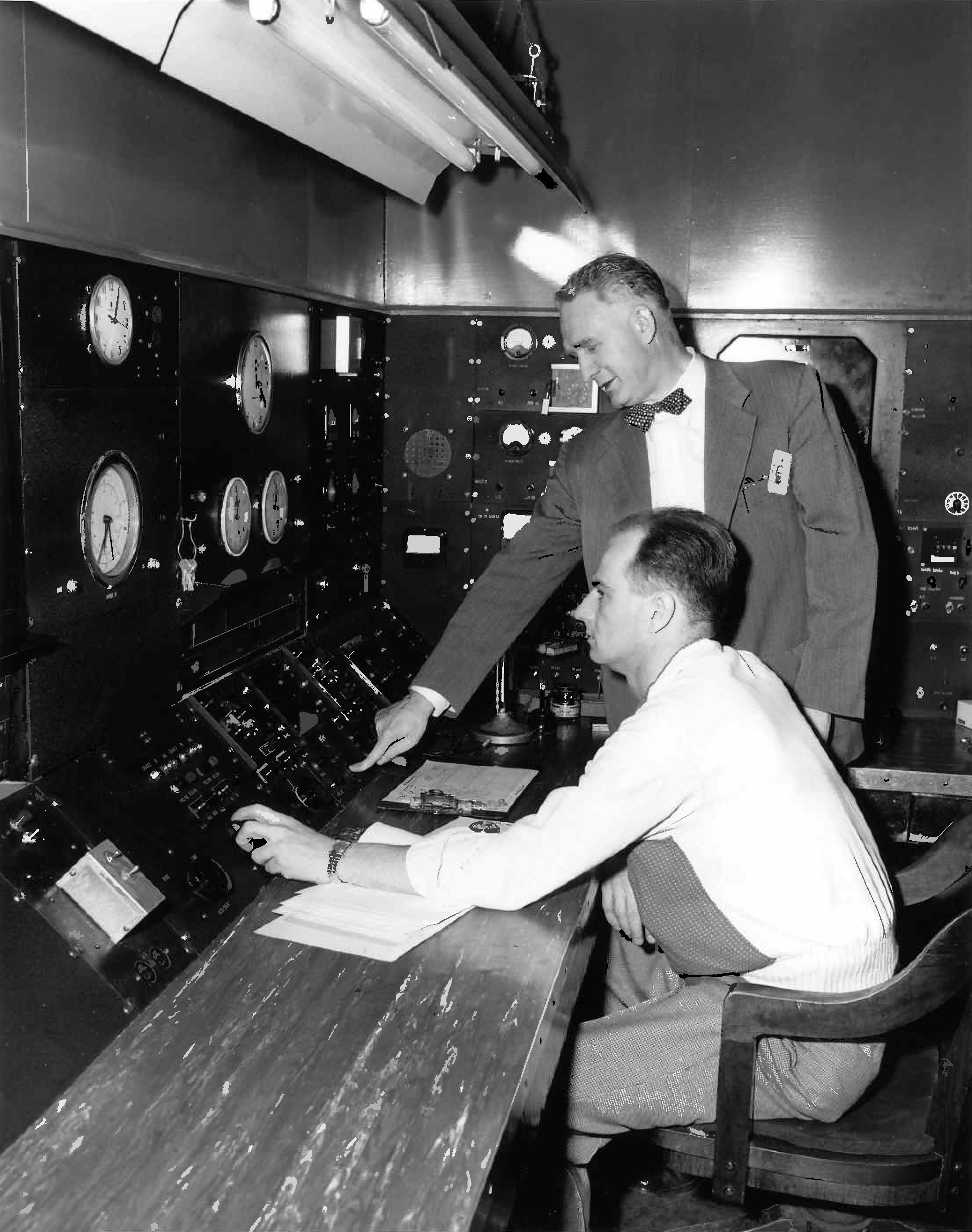
Zinn (standing) presses the button that closes down the Chicago Pile-3 unit for good.

On July 11, 1946, the Argonne laboratory officially became the Argonne National Laboratory, with Zinn as its first director. Alvin Weinberg characterized Zinn as "a model of what a director of the then-emerging national laboratories should be: sensitive to the aspirations of both contractor and fund provider, but confident enough to prevail when this was necessary."

One of the first problems confronting Zinn was that of accommodation. The Federal government had promised to restore Site A to the Cook County Forest Preserves after the war, and despite intervention from the Secretary of War, Robert P. Patterson, the most the Cook County Forest Preserves Commission would agree to was that the Argonne National Laboratory could continue to occupy a portion of the lease until a new site was found. Zinn rejected alternate sites outside the Chicago area, and the Army found a new site for the laboratory's permanent home about 5 miles (8.0 km) away in DuPage County, Illinois, which became known as Site D.

Under Zinn, the Argonne National Laboratory adopted slightly more progressive hiring practices than other contemporary institutions. Three African American women and seven men, six of whom had worked on the Manhattan Project, were employed in research at Argonne at a time when the Los Alamos National Laboratory had no African American scientists. Argonne also appointed women to positions of authority, with Maria Goeppert-Mayer as a section leader in the theoretical physics division, and Hoylande Young as director of the technical information division.

The Atomic Energy Commission (AEC) replaced the Manhattan Project on January 1, 1947, and on January 1, 1948 it announced that the Argonne National Laboratory would be "focused chiefly on problems of reactor development." Zinn did not seek the additional responsibility, which he realised would divert the Laboratory away from research, and divert him from other responsibilities, such as designing a fast breeder reactor. He even obtained a written assurance from Carroll L. Wilson, the AEC's general manager, that it would not. He was therefore willing to collaborate with Alvin Weinberg to allow the Oak Ridge National Laboratory to remain involved in reactor design. Nonetheless, reactor research accounted for almost half the laboratory's budget in 1949, and 84 percent of its research was classified.

Zinn did not get along well with Captain Hyman G. Rickover, the US Navy's Director of Naval Reactors, but nonetheless Argonne assisted in the development of nuclear marine propulsion, eventually producing two reactors, a land-based prototype Mark I and a propulsion reactor, the Mark II. The STR (Submarine Thermal Reactor) pressurized water reactor designed at Argonne powered the first nuclear-powered submarine, USS Nautilus, and became the basis of nearly all the reactors installed in warships.

The other branch of reactor development at the Argonne National Laboratory, and the one closer to Zinn's heart, was the fast breeder reactor. At the time it was believed that uranium was a scarce resource, so it would be wise to make the best use of it. The breeders were designed to create more fissile material than they consumed. By 1948, he had become convinced that it would be unwise to build large experimental reactors near Chicago, and the AEC acquired land around Arco, Idaho, which became an outpost of Argonne. The Experimental Breeder Reactor I (EBR-I, but known at Argonne as "ZIP" — Zinn's Infernal Pile) was the first reactor to be cooled by liquid metal, and the first to produce electricity. It proved the breeder concept. AEC Chairman Gordon Dean described it as a major milestone in nuclear history.

The BORAX Experiments were a series of destructive tests of boiling water reactors conducted by Argonne National Laboratory in Idaho. The BORAX-1 test was conducted under Zinn's supervision in 1954. He had the control rods removed to demonstrate that the reactor would shut down without trouble, and it immediately blew up with a loud bang and a tall column of dark smoke, a turn of events that he had not anticipated. He shouted to Harold Lichtenberg to put the control rods back in again, but Lichtenberg pointed out that one was already flying through the air. Zinn later had to testify on the experiment before the Joint Committee on Atomic Energy.

== Later life ==
After leaving the Argonne National Laboratory in 1956, Zinn moved to Florida, where he founded his own consulting firm, General Nuclear Engineering, with its headquarters in Dunedin, Florida. The company was involved in the design and construction of pressurized water reactors. It was acquired by Combustion Engineering in 1964, and he became a vice president and head of its nuclear division. He stepped down from this position in 1970, but remained a board member until 1986. He served as a member of the President's Science Advisory Committee from 1960 to 1962, and a member of the General Advisory Committee of the AEC and its successor, the Energy Research and Development Administration, from 1972 to 1975.

Over the years Zinn received multiple awards for his work, including a special commendation from the AEC in 1956, the Atoms for Peace Award in 1960, the Enrico Fermi Award in 1969, and the Elliott Cresson Medal from The Franklin Institute in 1970. In 1955 he was elected as the first president of the American Nuclear Society (ANS).

Zinn's wife Jean died in 1964. He married Mary Teresa Pratt in 1966, and thereby acquired two stepsons, Warren and Robert Johnson. He died in Mease Countryside Hospital in Safety Harbor, Florida, on February 14, 2000, after suffering a stroke. He was survived by his wife Mary, sons John and Robert and stepson Warren. Robert had become a professor of astronomy at Yale University.

== Walter H. Zinn Award ==
Since 1976, the American Nuclear Society's Operations and Power Division, has annually presented the Walter H. Zinn Award to recognize an individual "for a notable and sustained contribution to the nuclear power industry that has not been widely recognized."
