= Red Gate Woods =

Open space in Cook County, Illinois, US

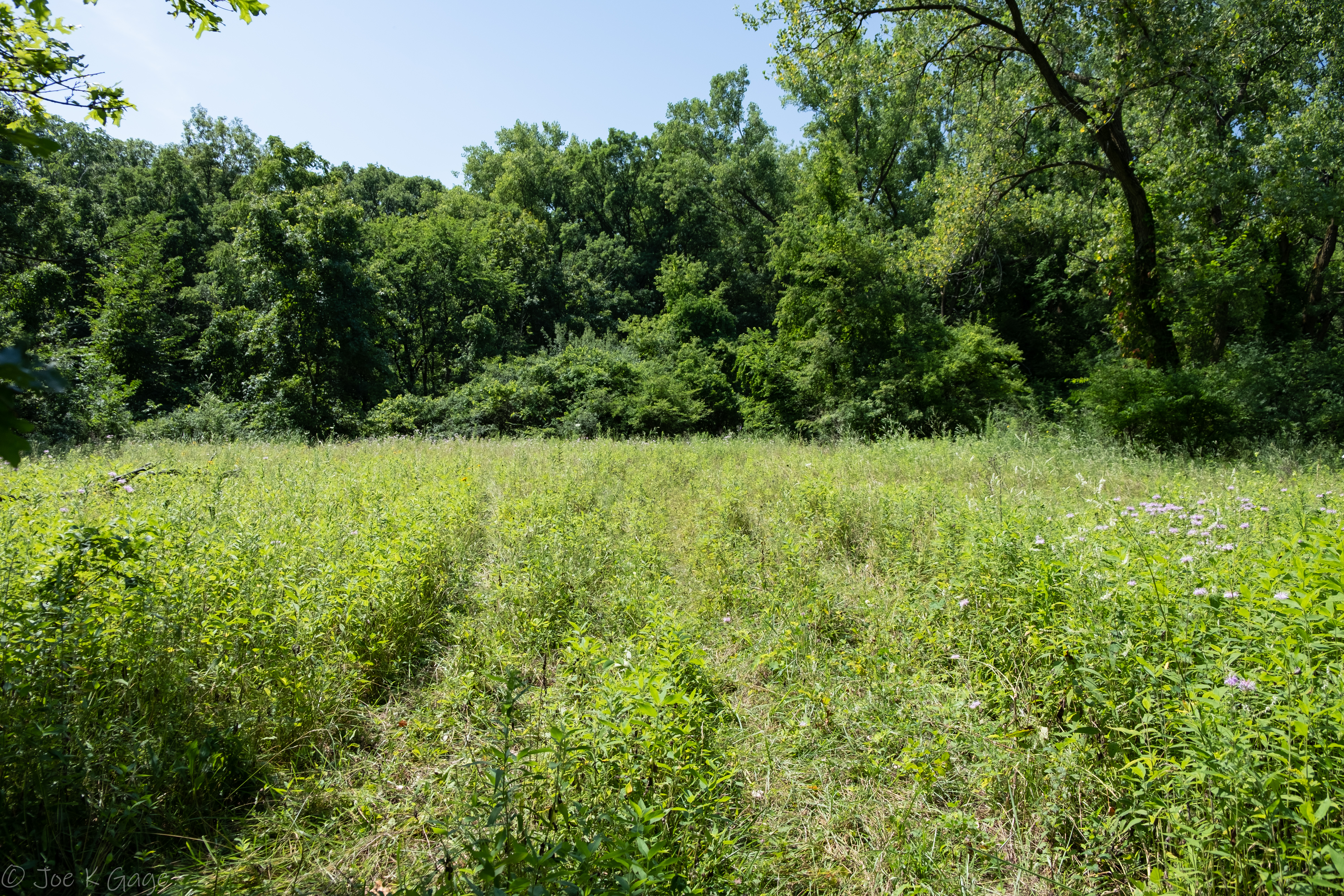
- Red Gate Woods

- Location within Illinois
- Location: Cook County, Illinois
- Nearest city: Chicago, Illinois
- Coordinates: 41.7101°N 87.9126°W
- Operator: Forest Preserve District of Cook County

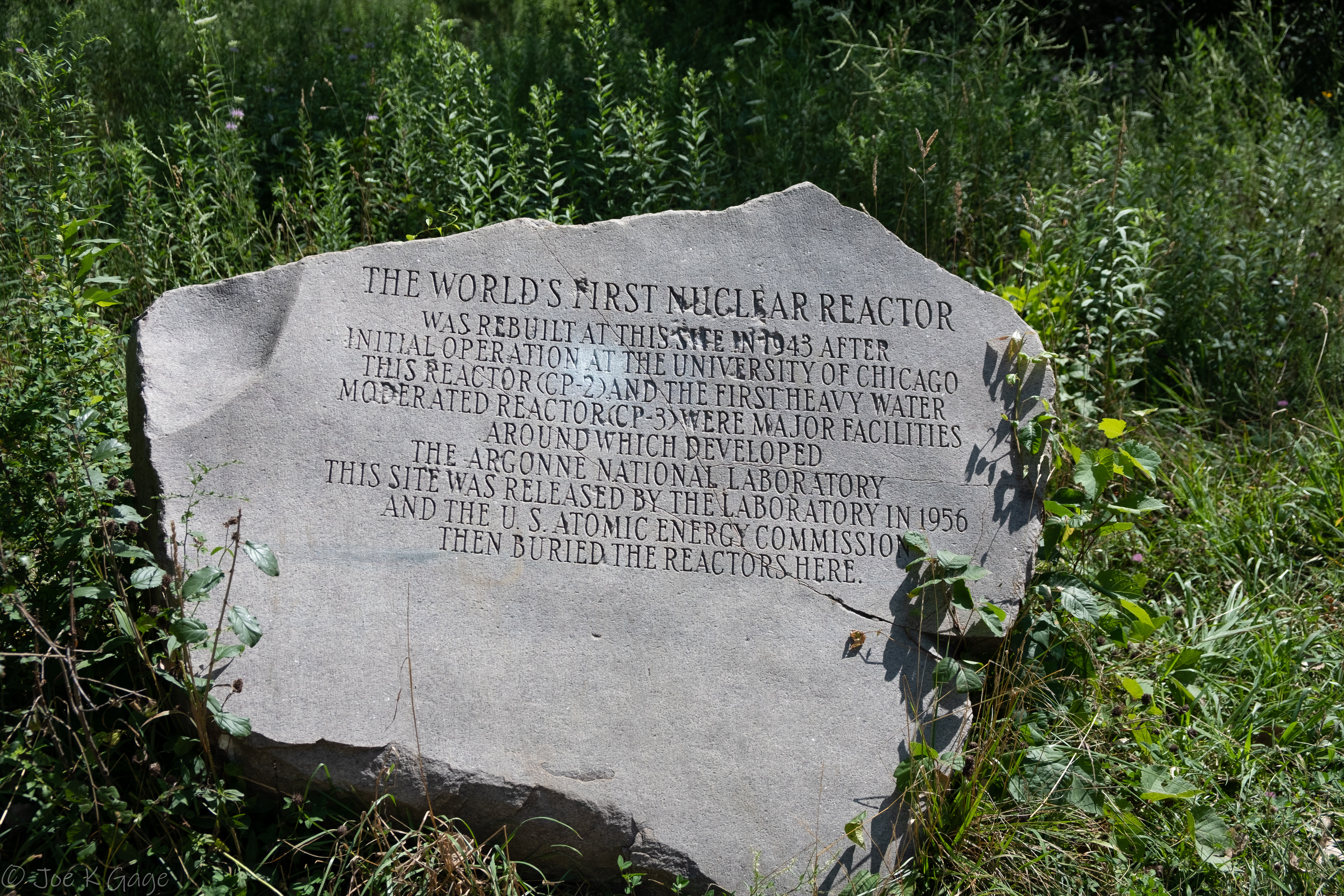
Sign at Red Gate Woods

Red Gate Woods is a forest preserve section within the Palos Forest Preserves, a division of the Forest Preserve District of Cook County, Illinois.

== Forest preserve ==
It is located near where the Cal-Sag Channel meets the Chicago Sanitary and Ship Canal. In the woods is the original site of Argonne National Laboratory and the Site A/Plot M Disposal Site, which contains the buried remains of Chicago Pile-1, the world's first artificial nuclear reactor.

This section of the forest preserves, then code named "Argonne" (after Forest of Argonne) was leased by county commissioners to the Manhattan Project (and later Argonne Laboratory) in the 1940s and 1950s. After its initial tests, the reactor at Stagg Field at the University of Chicago was removed and reassembled at the Metallurgical Laboratory site in these woods ("Site A"). Local residents reported encountering US Army MPs guarding the area during World War II but no one was aware of the true nature of the activities until long after the war. After further experiments and the shutdown of Pile 1, then designated Pile 2, a huge hole was dug and the 2-story high reactor was pushed into it and buried ("Plot M"). Other reactors were also built and operated at the site and nuclear waste was buried there. The site is monitored by the United States Department of Energy and is open to the public.

By the 1970s there was increased public concern about the levels of radioactivity at the site, which was used for recreation by local residents. Surveys conducted in the 1980s found strontium-90 in the soil at Plot M, trace amounts of tritium in nearby wells, and plutonium, technetium, caesium, and uranium in the area. In 1994, the United States Department of Energy and the Argonne National Laboratory yielded to public pressure and earmarked $24.7 million and $3.4 million respectively to rehabilitate the site. As part of the cleanup, 500 cubic yards (380 m^{3}) of radioactive waste was removed and sent to the Hanford Site for disposal. By 2002, the Illinois Department of Public Health had determined that the remaining materials posed no danger to public health.

There is signage in the parking lot showing Albert Einstein and Enrico Fermi at the Red Gate Woods site during the Manhattan Project. Concrete markers designate historic sites and the foundations of Manhattan Project labs still exist.

== See also ==
- Metallurgical Laboratory
- Stagg Field
- Manhattan Project
