= Henry Winston Newson =

Henry Winston Newson (November 26, 1909, in Lawrence, Kansas – May 14, 1978, in Durham, North Carolina) was an American physical chemist and nuclear physicist, known for his research on nuclear resonances and as one of the co-inventors of the control system used in nuclear reactors.

== Biography ==
His parents were the mathematics professors Henry Byron Newson and Mary Frances Winston Newson. Henry Winston Newson graduated in 1931 with a B.Sc. in chemistry from the University of Illinois Urbana-Champaign and in 1934 with a Ph.D. in chemistry from the University of Chicago. His thesis advisor was William Draper Harkins. Henry Newson married Meta F. Thode in 1934. The couple spent two years from 1934 to 1936 at the Lawrence Radiation Laboratory. There he worked as a research fellow assisting Ernest O. Lawrence in constructing the laboratory's cyclotron. At the University of Chicago from 1936 to 1941 Newson was an instructor, first in chemistry and subsequently in physics. The Newson's first daughter, Meta Mary, was born in Chicago in August 1941. From 1941 to 1943 Henry Newson was a senior physicist in the University of Chicago's Metallurgical Laboratory (Met Lab), where in December 1942 the first controlled nuclear chain reaction was produced. From 1943 to 1944 he was a section chief at Clinton Laboratories (later renamed Oak Ridge National Laboratory). He was from 1944 to 1945 a technical expert at Hanford Engineering Works and from 1945 to 1946 a group leader at Los Alamos National Laboratory, during the development of the atomic bomb. From 1946 to 1948 he was a chief physicist at Oak Ridge National Laboratory. In 1948 the Newsons' second daughter, Caroline, was born, and he became a full professor in the physics department of Duke University.

Newson chaired Duke University's physics department from 1973 to 1975. He was a professor of physics at Duke University and TUNL's director until his death in 1978. His successor as TUNL's director was his former doctoral student, Edward Bilpuch (1927–2012). Newson's doctoral students include John H. Gibbons and Myron L. Good.

Newson was elected in 1960 a Fellow of the American Physical Society. Upon his death the Newson family established the Henry W. Newson Lecture Series Fund at Duke University. The university established a Henry Newson Professorship of Physics (currently held by Haiyan Gao). Henry Newson was survived by his widow, two daughters, and six grandchildren.

== Selected publications ==
- Newson, Henry W. (1937). "Transmutation Functions at High Bombarding Energies". Physical Review. 51 (8): 620–623. Bibcode:1937PhRv...51..620N. doi:10.1103/PhysRev.51.620.
- Marshak, Harvey; Newson, Henry W. (1957). "Neutron Resonances in the keV Region: Odd-Intermediate Nuclei". Physical Review. 106 (1): 110–116. Bibcode:1957PhRv..106..110M. doi:10.1103/PhysRev.106.110.
- Newson, H. W.; Williamson, R. M.; Jones, K. W.; Gibbons, J. H.; Marshak, H. (1957). "Li^{7}(p, n), (p, p′γ), and (p, γ) Reactions near Neutron Threshold". Physical Review. 108 (5): 1294–1300. doi:10.1103/PhysRev.108.1294.
- Parks, P. B.; Newson, H. W.; Williamson, R. M. (1958). "Method of Canceling Energy Fluctuations of a van de Graaff Ion Beam". Review of Scientific Instruments. 29 (10): 834–839. Bibcode:1958RScI...29..834P. doi:10.1063/1.1716015.
- Newson, H.W; Block, R.C; Nichols, P.F; Taylor, A.; Furr, A.K; Merzbacher, E. (1959). "s- and p-wave neutron spectroscopy: Part II. Even-even nuclei". Annals of Physics. 8 (2): 211–222. Bibcode:1959AnPhy...8..211N. doi:10.1016/0003-4916(59)90019-3.
- Bilpuch, E.G; Weston, L.W; Newson, H.W (1960). "Neutron capture cross sections in the keV region: Part I. Methods of measurement and analysis". Annals of Physics. 10 (4): 455–476. Bibcode:1960AnPhy..10..455B. doi:10.1016/0003-4916(60)90117-2.
- Weston, L.W; Seth, K.K; Bilpuch, E.G; Newson, H.W (1960). "Neutron capture cross sections in the keV region: Part II. Spin-orbit coupling and the optical model". Annals of Physics. 10 (4): 477–489. Bibcode:1960AnPhy..10..477W. doi:10.1016/0003-4916(60)90118-4.
- Bilpuch, E.G; Seth, K.K; Bowman, C.D; Tabony, R.H; Smith, R.C; Newson, H.W (1961). "s- and p-wave neutron spectroscopy: Part VII. Widths of neutron resonances". Annals of Physics. 14: 387–418. Bibcode:1961AnPhy..14..387B. doi:10.1016/0003-4916(61)90063-X.
- Newson, Henry W. (1961). "Symmetric and Asymmetric Fission". Physical Review. 122 (4): 1224–1226. Bibcode:1961PhRv..122.1224N. doi:10.1103/PhysRev.122.1224.
- Bowman, C.D; Bilpuch, E.G; Newson, H.W (1962). "s- and p-wave neutron spectroscopy: Part VIII. Subshell effect on nuclear level spacing nearA = 50". Annals of Physics. 17 (3): 319–378. Bibcode:1962AnPhy..17..319B. doi:10.1016/0003-4916(62)90035-0.
- Farrell, J.A.; Bilpuch, E.G.; Newson, H.W. (1966). "s- and p-wave neutron spectroscopy: Part XIa. Level spacins in even intermediate elements". Annals of Physics. 37 (3): 367–410. Bibcode:1966AnPhy..37..367F. doi:10.1016/0003-4916(66)90204-1.
- Keyworth, G.A.; Kyker, G.C.; Bilpuch, E.G.; Newson, H.W. (1966). "A high-resolution study of isobaric analogue resonances in ^{41}K". Nuclear Physics. 89 (3): 590–608. Bibcode:1966NucPh..89..590K. doi:10.1016/0029-5582(66)90934-5.
- Keyworth, G.A.; Kyker, G.C.; Bilpuch, E.G.; Newson, H.W. (1966). "Fine structure of isobaric analogue resonances in ^{41}K". Physics Letters. 20 (3): 281–284. Bibcode:1966PhL....20..281K. doi:10.1016/0031-9163(66)90365-9.
- Keyworth, G. A.; Wilhjelm, P.; Kyker, G. C.; Newson, H. W.; Bilpuch, E. G. (1968). "High-Resolution Study of Isobaric Analog Resonances in ^{23}Na". Physical Review. 176 (4): 1302–1310. Bibcode:1968PhRv..176.1302K. doi:10.1103/PhysRev.176.1302.
- Sellin, David L.; Newson, Henry W.; Bilpuch, Edward G. (1969). "High resolution investigation of resonances in ^{19}F". Annals of Physics. 51 (3): 461–475. Bibcode:1969AnPhy..51..461S. doi:10.1016/0003-4916(69)90138-9.
- Browne, J.C.; Newson, H.W.; Bilpuch, E.G.; Mitchell, G.E. (1970). "Fine structure of analogue states in ^{59}Cu, ^{61}Cu, ^{63}Cu and ^{65}Cu". Nuclear Physics A. 153 (2): 481–501. Bibcode:1970NuPhA.153..481B. doi:10.1016/0375-9474(70)90787-6.
- Moses, J.D.; Newson, H.W.; Bilpuch, E.G.; Mitchell, G.E. (1971). "Fine structure of analogue states in ^{51}Mn, ^{53}Mn and ^{55}Mn". Nuclear Physics A. 175 (3): 556–582. Bibcode:1971NuPhA.175..556M. doi:10.1016/0375-9474(71)90450-7.
- Lindstrom, D.P.; Newson, H.W.; Bilpuch, E.G.; Mitchell, G.E. (1971). "Fine structure of analogue states in ^{55}Co, ^{57}Co and ^{59}Co". Nuclear Physics A. 168 (1): 37–55. Bibcode:1971NuPhA.168...37L. doi:10.1016/0375-9474(71)90650-6.
- Boyce, J. R.; Hayward, T. D.; Bass, R.; Newson, H. W.; Bilpuch, E. G.; Purser, F. O.; Schmitt, H. W. (1974). "Absolute cross sections for proton-induced fission of the uranium isotopes". Physical Review C. 10 (1): 231–244. Bibcode:1974PhRvC..10..231B. doi:10.1103/PhysRevC.10.231.
- Newson, H.W.; Bilpuch, E.G.; Purser, F.O.; Boyce, J.R.; Clegg, T.B. (1974). "An operational review of the TUNL Cyclo-Graaff". Nuclear Instruments and Methods. 122: 99–113. Bibcode:1974NucIM.122...99N. doi:10.1016/0029-554X(74)90474-1.
- Glasgow, D. W.; Purser, F. O.; Hogue, H.; Clement, J. C.; Stelzer, K.; Mack, G.; Boyce, J. R.; Epperson, D. H.; Buccino, S. G.; Lisowski, P. W.; Glendinning, S. G.; Bilpuch, E. G.; Newson, H. W.; Gould, C. R. (1976). "Differential Elastic and Inelastic Scattering of 9- to 15-MeV Neutrons from Carbon". Nuclear Science and Engineering. 61 (4): 521–533. Bibcode:1976NSE....61..521G. doi:10.13182/NSE76-A14488.
- Hogue, H. H.; Behren, P. L. Von; Epperson, D. H.; Glendinning, S. G.; Lisowski, P. W.; Nelson, C. E.; Newson, H. W.; Purser, F. O.; Tornow, W.; Gould, C. R.; Seagondollar, L. W. (1978). "Differential Elastic and Inelastic Scattering of 7- to 15-MeV Neutrons from Beryllium". Nuclear Science and Engineering. 68 (1): 38–42. Bibcode:1978NSE....68...38H. doi:10.13182/NSE78-A27268.
