= Heavy-water reactor =

Type of nuclear reactor

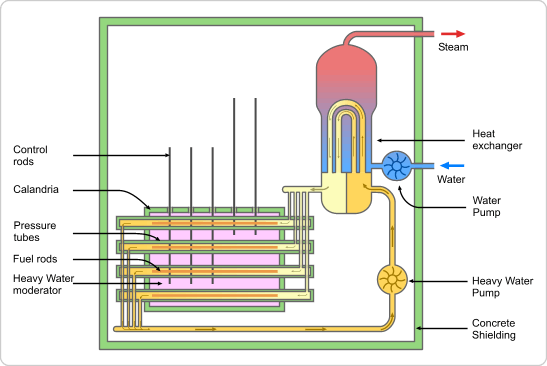
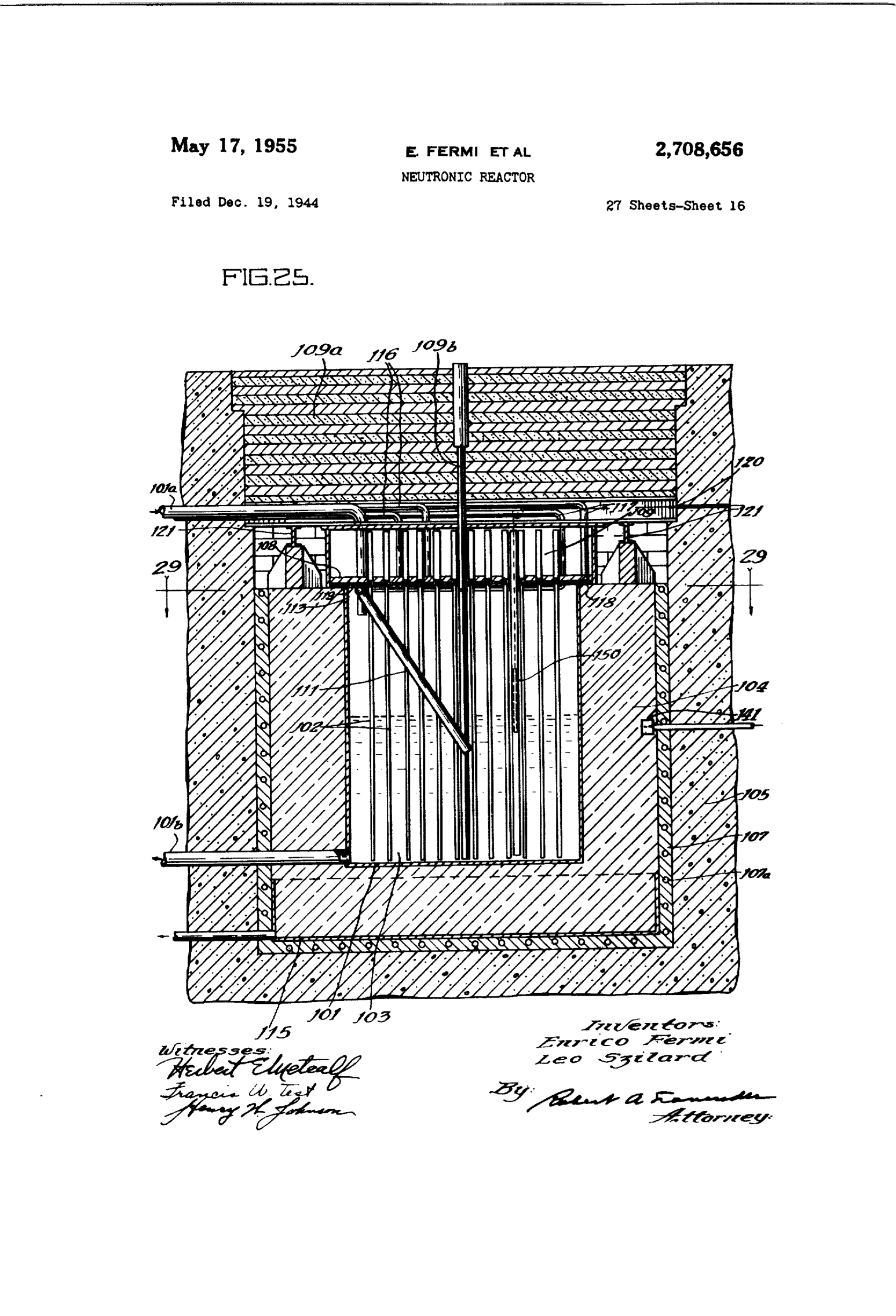
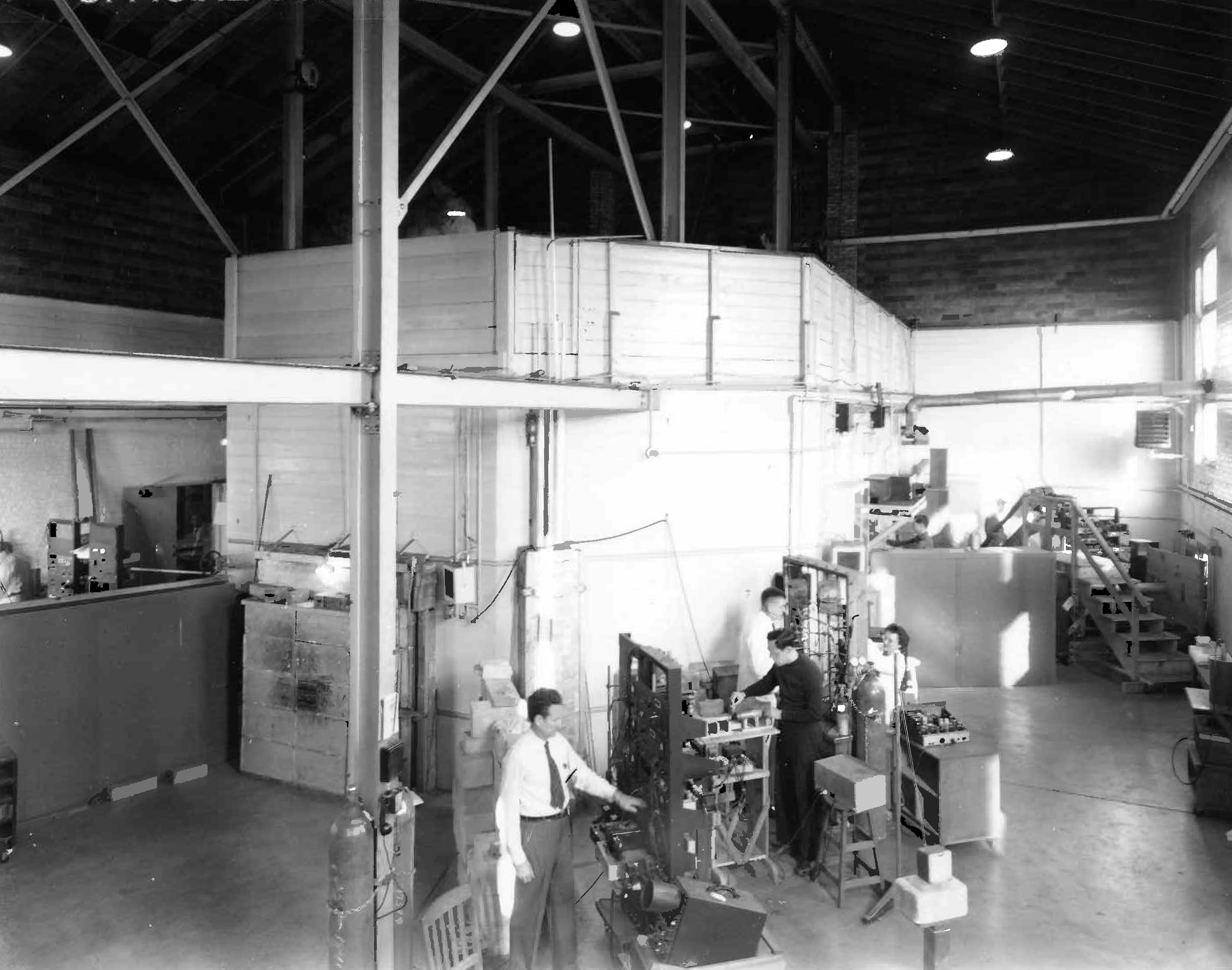
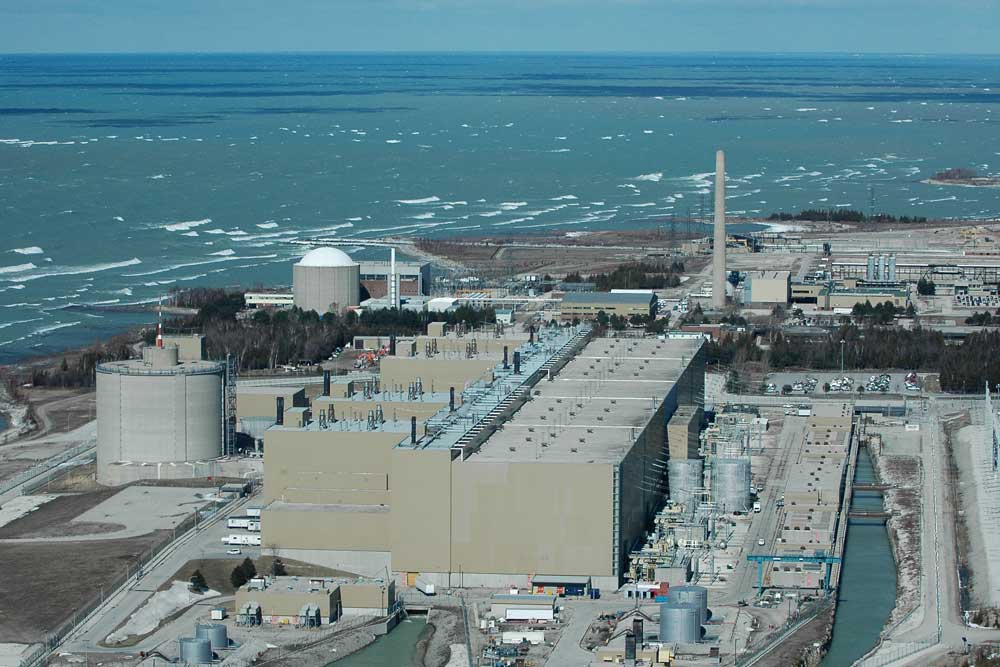
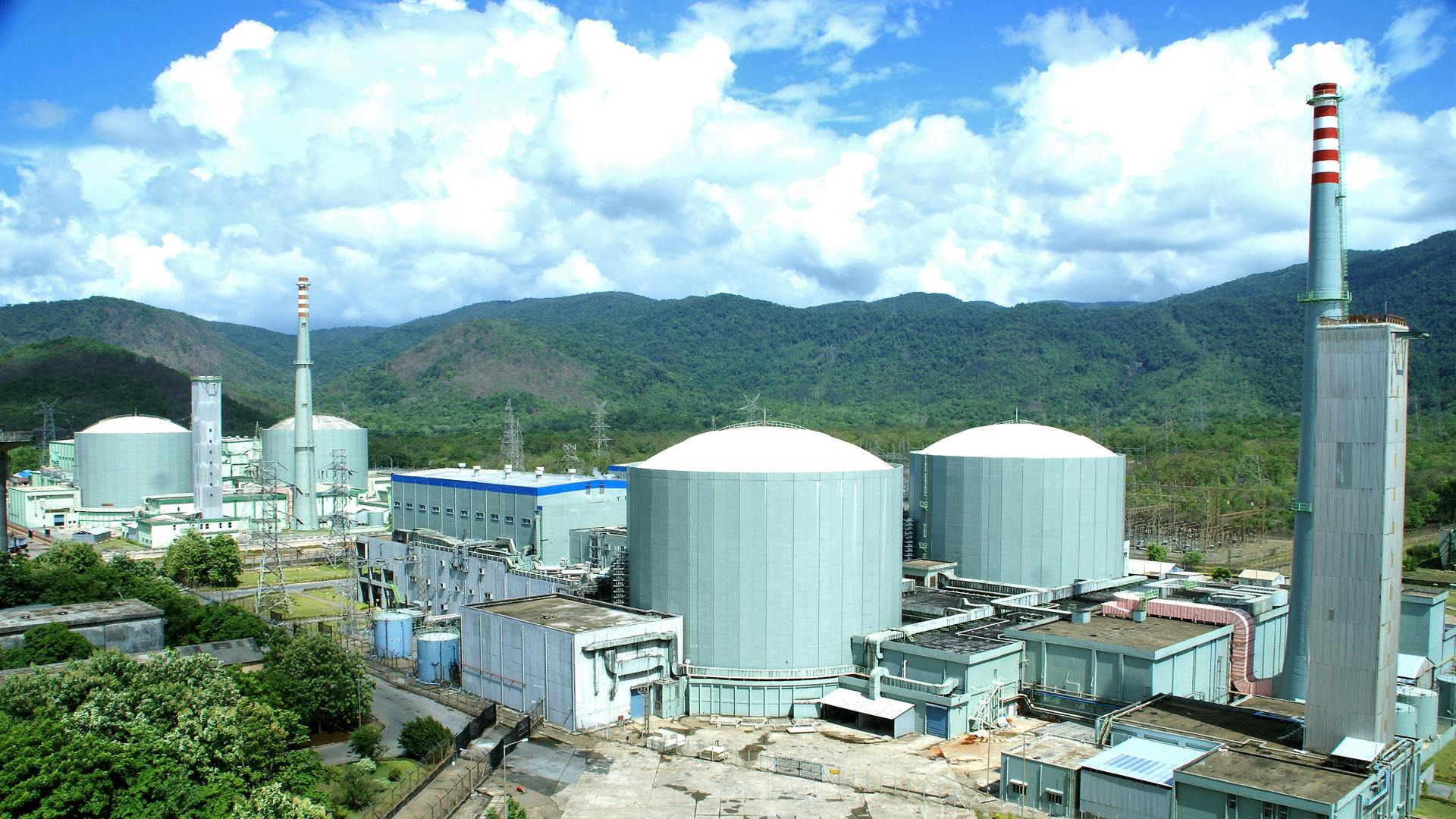
From top, right to left
1. Schematic of the CANDU design of commercial heavy water reactors
2. Chicago Pile-3, the world's first heavy water reactor, built in 1943 for the Manhattan Project
3. An early patent drawing for a heavy water reactor, by Enrico Fermi and Leo Szilard
4. Bruce Nuclear Generating Station, one of the largest CANDU plants in Canada
5. Kaiga Generating Station, one of the largest IPHWR plants in India

A heavy water reactor (HWR) is a type of nuclear reactor which uses heavy water (D_{2}O, deuterium oxide) as a neutron moderator. It may also use this as the coolant, in the case of pressurized heavy water reactors. Due to heavy water's low neutron absorption cross section, HWRs can operate with natural uranium fuel.

== History ==
"Atomic pile" experiments were carried out across Europe and North America following the 1938 discovery of nuclear fission. The sole supply of heavy water was from the Vemork hydroelectric power plant in Norway. The world's entire supply had been sent to Paris for experiments, but smuggled to England during the Fall of France. In November 1940, Hans von Halban and Lew Kowarski at the University of Cambridge carried out one of the first heavy water-moderated pile experiments, measuring net neutron production. In 1958, Patrick Blackett wrote about Frédéric Joliot-Curie: "There is little doubt that, had the war not intervened, the world’s first self-sustaining chain reaction would have been achieved in France." From late 1940, the Nazi German nuclear weapons program focused on heavy water piles as their path to a reactor, discounting graphite on erroneous measurements of Walther Bothe. This culminated in the B-VIII experiment.

The Manhattan Project pursued both graphite and heavy water-moderated reactors as paths to plutonium weapons. The P-9 Project sourced the heavy water. At Site A, alongside CP-2, Chicago Pile-3 was constructed as the world's first heavy water reactor, achieving criticality in May 1944. In September 1945, the ZEEP reactor achieved criticality in Canada, following development by a team of European scientists excluded from the central work of the Manhattan Project. Canada further developed HWRs with the NRX research reactor and ultimately CANDU design of commercial reactors. In the United States, HWRs were ultimately employed from the 1950s on for plutonium and tritium production at the Savannah River Site.

HWRs were also chosen as early research reactors in many countries, including the first EL-1 in France, the third TVR in the USSR, and the first HWRR in China.

== Categorization ==
HWRs can be categorized by whether they use a pressure-shell or pressure-tube design. They can also be categorized by the coolant. Coolant options include:

- Boiling heavy water
  - Halden Reactor
- Pressurized heavy water
- Boiling light water
- Organic medium

== See also ==
- Pressurized heavy-water reactor
- CANDU reactor
- IPHWR
