= Gao Haiyan =

Gao Haiyan or Haiyan Gao may refer to:

- Gao Haiyan (sailor), Chinese sailor
- Haiyan Gao (physicist), Chinese-American nuclear physicist
