= Swallow Cliff Woods =

Nature preserve in Illinois, United States

Coordinates: 41.682°N 87.862°W

Swallow Cliff Woods is an 800-acre nature preserve located near Palos Park, Illinois, in the Palos Forest Preserves. It was built in 1930 by the Civilian Conservation Corps and operated by the Cook County Forest Preserve District.

One of the highlights is a 100 foot bluff with 125 limestone stairs of varying heights. The stairs lead up to what was once a toboggan slide. Although the slide closed in 2004, the steps remain and are popular all year round for outdoor exercise; sledding is still allowed if you bring your own sled.

Hikers can still enjoy over 800 acres with 8 miles of trails.
