= Saganashkee Slough =

Lake in Illinois

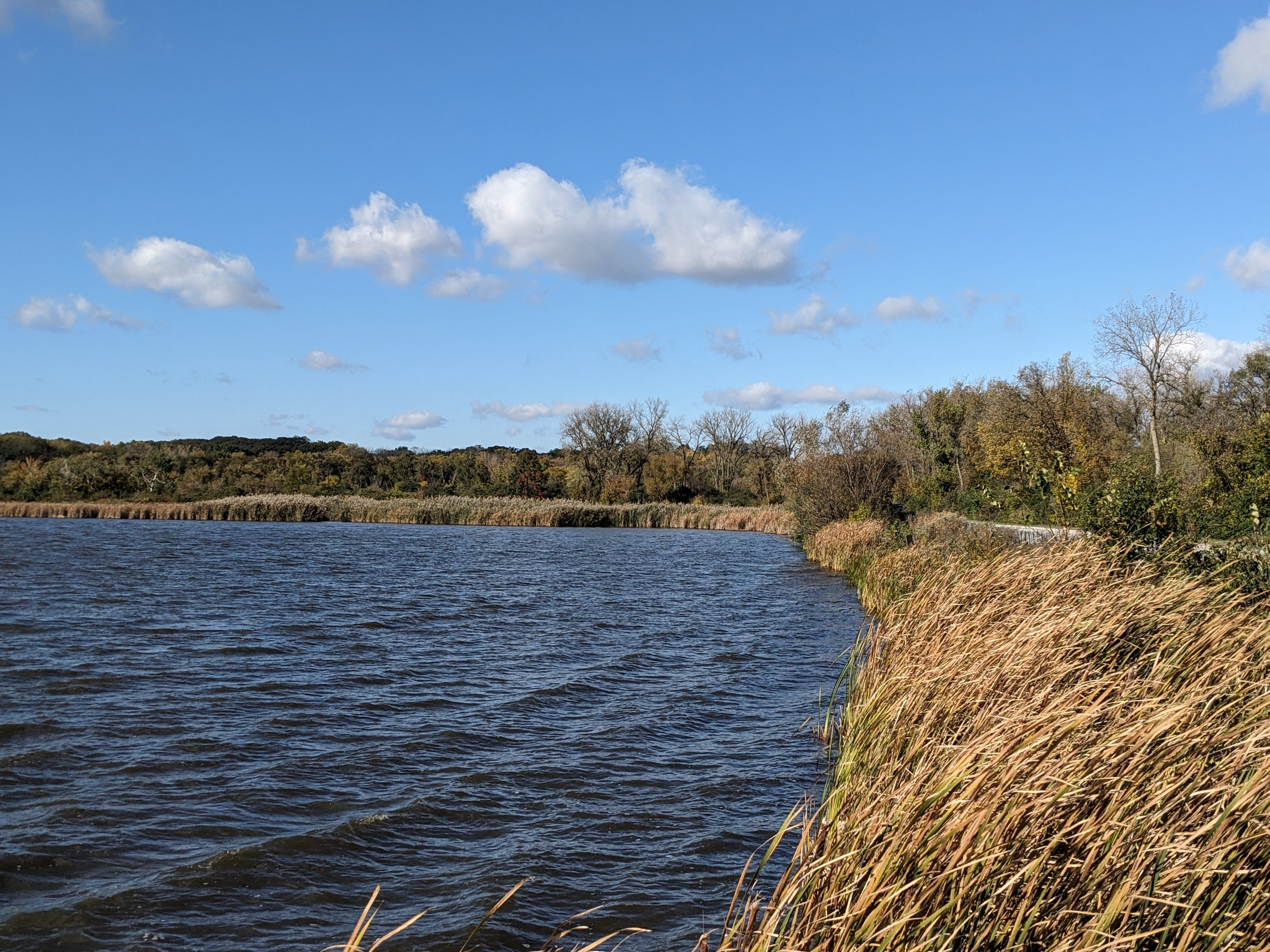
- Saganashkee Slough

- Location within Illinois Location within the United States
- Location: Cook County, Illinois, United States
- Coordinates: 41°41′38″N 87°53′28″W
- Type: Reservoir
- Basin countries: United States
- Surface area: 377 acres (153 ha)
- Average depth: 6.5 ft (2.0 m)
- Surface elevation: 591 ft (180 m)

Saganashkee Slough is a 377 acres (153 ha), manmade riparian lake that forms part of the valley of the Cal-Sag Channel. It is located in the Palos Forest Preserves of Cook County, Illinois, on wetland that was drained but was later reverted to a lake starting in 1948-1949 by the construction of dams and levees. Saganashkee Slough, like other segments of the Cal-Sag canal and valley system, drains into the Des Plaines River and ultimately into the Illinois River.

== Backwater lake and fish ==
Like other backwater lakes in the Palos Forest Preserve system, the Saganashkee Slough is noted for birdwatching and fish. The Forest Preserve District of Cook County states that loons, herons, grebes, mergansers, and many other types of waterfowl have been seen at or flying over the slough. Fish listed by the Forest Preserve District include the bullhead, crappie, various types of catfish, largemouth bass, yellow bass, and northern pike.
