= Site A =

Nuclear disposal site in Cook County, Illinois, US

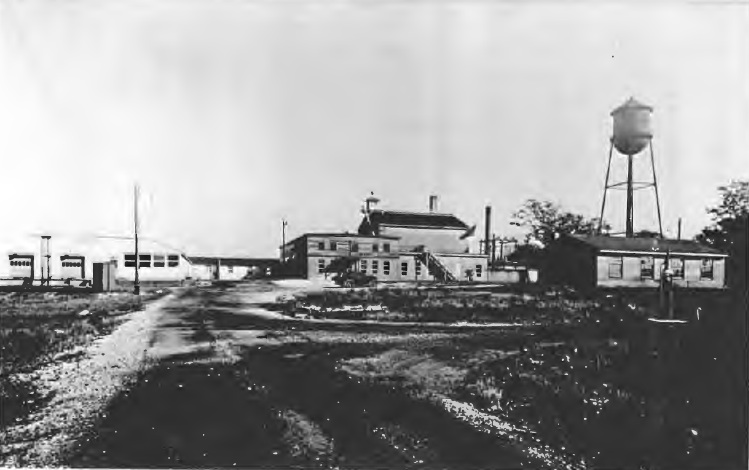
- Laboratory buildings at Site A
- Established: 1942
- Field of research: Nuclear physics
- Location: 41°42′08″N 87°54′44″W
- Operating agency: University of Chicago

Site A was a research facility in the Argonne Forest, now known as Red Gate Woods, near Chicago where, during World War II, research on behalf of the Manhattan Project was carried out. Operated by the University of Chicago's Metallurgical Laboratory, it was the site of Chicago Pile-2, a reconstructed and enlarged version of the world's first nuclear reactor, Chicago Pile-1. The first heavy-water reactor, Chicago Pile-3, was also constructed and operated at this site. Research was carried out under contract to the United States' Office of Scientific Research and Development. After the war, the site became the first home of Argonne National Laboratory, a federally funded research and development center.

The site was returned to the public forest agency in 1956, but Site A, and a nearby site formerly used for the disposal of low-level radioactive waste, Plot M, continue to be managed and monitored by the Department of Energy's Office of Legacy Management as the Site A/Plot M Disposal Site and access remained limited for some time thereafter.

The Site A/Plot M Disposal Site is located within Red Gate Woods in the Palos Forest Preserves, part of the Forest Preserve District of Cook County. The site contains buried radioactive waste from contaminated building debris, and the Chicago Pile-1 (CP-1/CP-2), and Chicago Pile-3 (CP-3) nuclear reactors. "Site A" was an early Manhattan Project code for the facility. "Plot M" was the code name used for the disposal ground. While buried remnants remain, substantial remediation has occurred at the site and it has been certified safe for ordinary public access by Illinois and the EPA since the late 1980s. Memorial markers have been placed at Site A, and Plot M.

== History ==
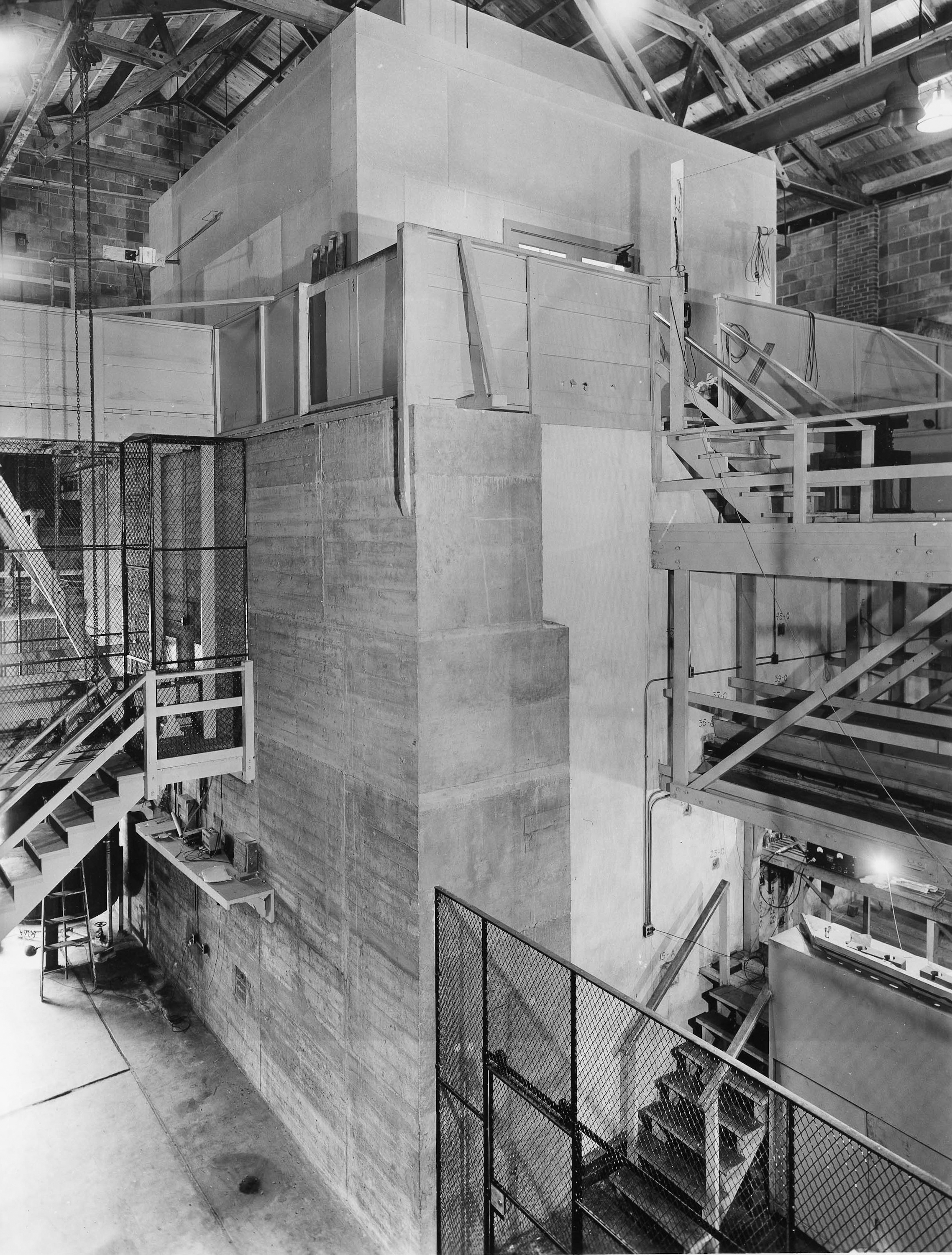
Chicago Pile-2, the world's second nuclear reactor, with its large concrete radiation shield.

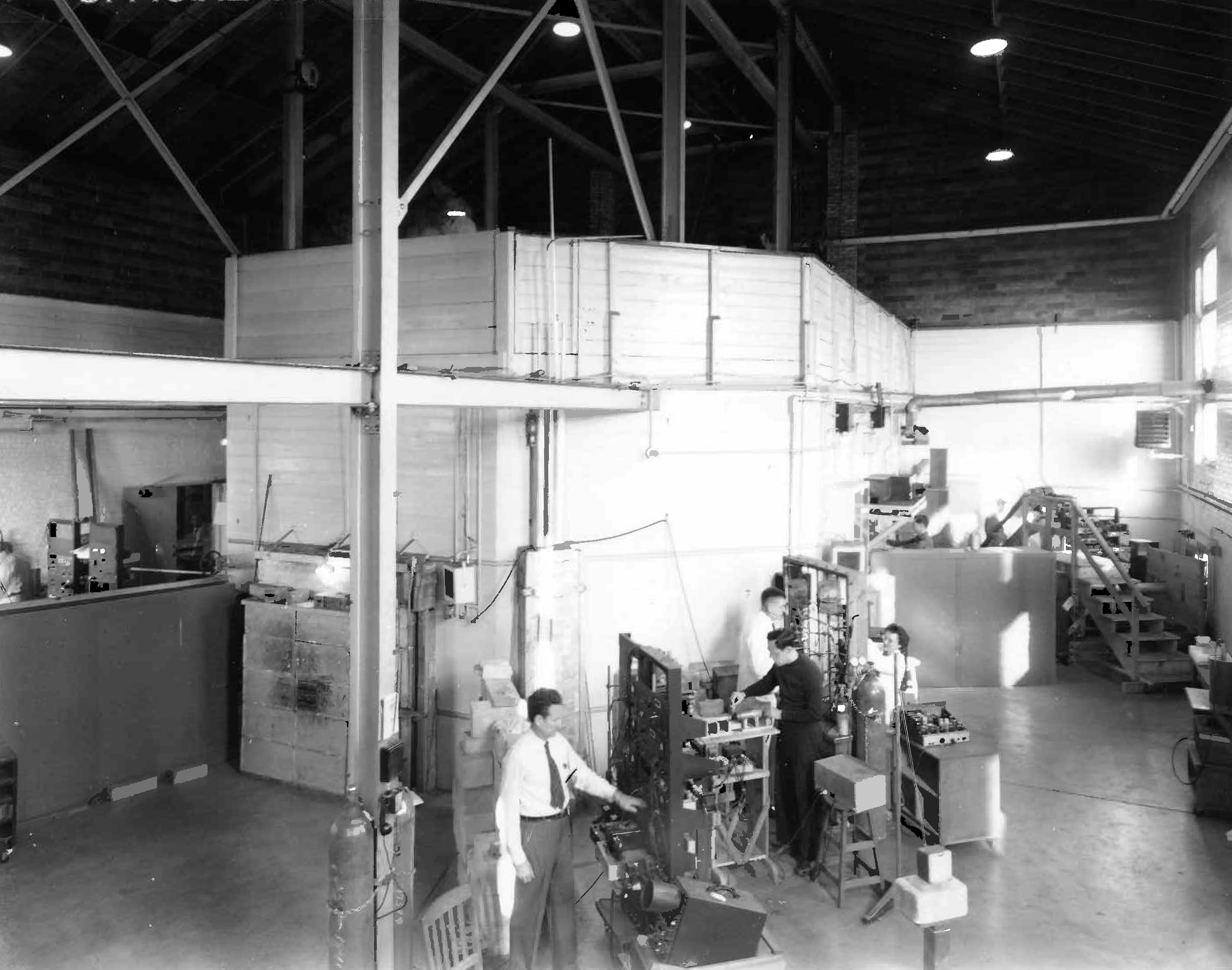
Chicago Pile-3, the world's first heavy water reactor.

The site was acquired with the intention that it should become home to a plutonium production pilot plant. It was desired that the site be within commutable distance of Chicago, but for reasons of safety and security, should not be too close to the city.

During a horseback ride in early 1942, the head of the Metallurgical Project, Professor Arthur Compton, identified a suitable site in what was then known as the Argonne Forest.

Once an estimate of the required land was available, the way was clear for the U.S. Army Corps of Engineers to lease 1,025 acres (4.15 km^{2}) of land from the forest preserve district, which was done in August 1942. However, very soon afterwards, it was found that the scale of operations would require a larger site, and plans for the pilot site were moved to Oak Ridge, Tennessee.

Shortly after the December 1942 demonstration of the first self-sustaining chain reaction at the University of Chicago, the research group led by Enrico Fermi needed to move to the larger, more remote laboratory campus. The first reactor, CP-1, was disassembled and moved to Site A in March 1943, enlarged by shielding and reconfigured it was re-designated, Chicago Pile-2. In May 1944 the laboratory first operated a second, heavy water-moderated reactor, CP-3 on the site.

== Site decommissioning ==
Argonne National Laboratory obtained an even larger, permanent site in Du Page County in 1947 and began moving its operations out of Site A to the new site. The two reactors operated until 1954, conducting reactor research and production of tritium. Decontamination and demolition of the buildings began in 1955. The reactors were defueled and the concrete shell for CP-3 was imploded and buried. In 1956 the property was returned to the forest preserve. Two granite monuments mark Site A and Plot M.

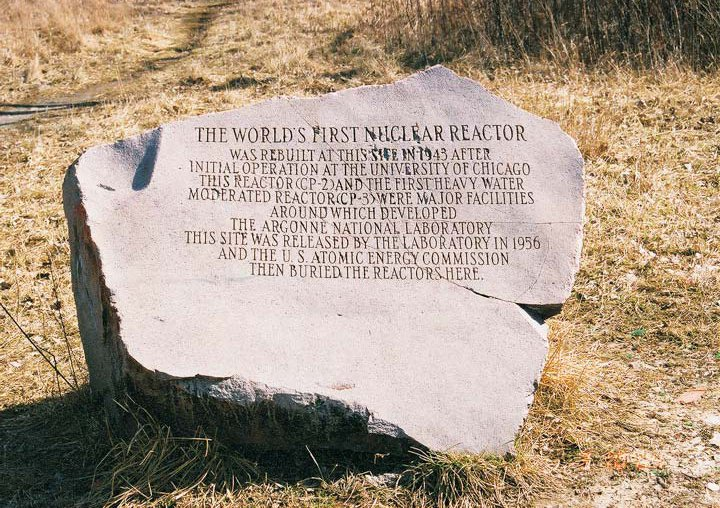
The marker at Site A

The Site A marker reads:

The world's first nuclear reactor was rebuilt at this site in 1943 after initial operation at the University of Chicago. This reactor (CP-2) and the first heavy water moderated reactor (CP-3) were major facilities around which developed the Argonne National Laboratory. This site was released by the laboratory in 1956 and the U.S. Atomic Energy Commission then buried the reactors here.

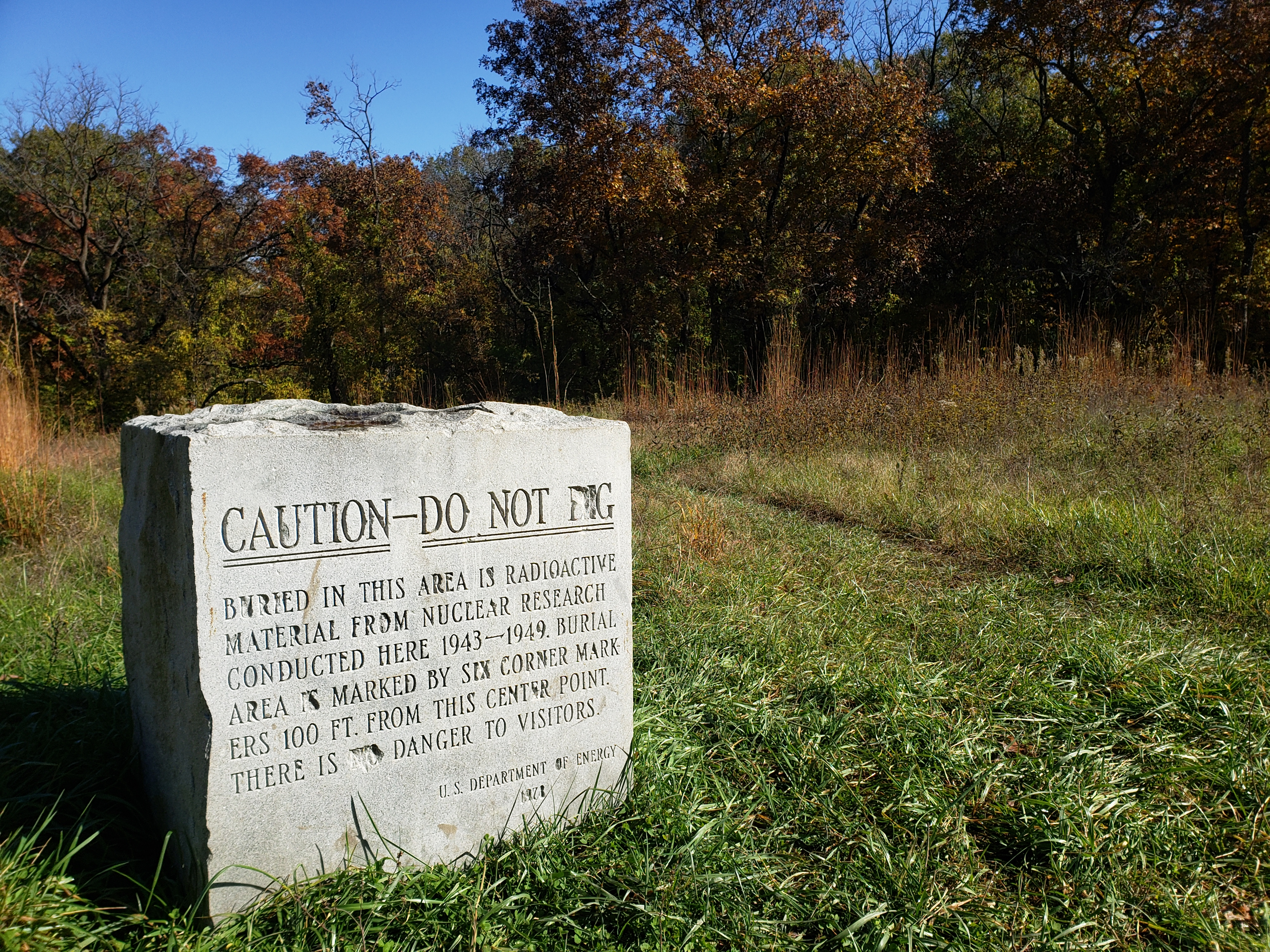
The marker at Plot M

The Plot M marker reads:

CAUTION—DO NOT DIG Buried in this area is radioactive material from nuclear research conducted here 1943–1949. Burial area is marked by six corner markers 100ft from this center point. There is no danger to visitors. U.S. Department of Energy 1978

Plot M was a dump for low-level radioactive waste generated at the site between 1943 and 1949. Initially buried in trenches, later in steel bins, the waste included tritium, uranium, and fission products in various forms including contaminated equipment, animal carcasses, and solids. In 1949 the burial of waste at the site was halted, and the dump was covered with grass until 1956, when a concrete cover was installed to protect the landfill from rainwater.

Surveillance of the site since the demolition in the 1950s has found small amounts of soil contamination with uranium and fission products, and some wells in Red Gate Woods had tritium concentrations as high as 13 nCi/L (480 Bq/L) in the late 1970s.

In April 1998 the fence separating Site A from the rest of Red Gate Woods was taken down after a Department of Energy determination that the risk to the public while enjoying the forest preserve is minimal.

== Location ==
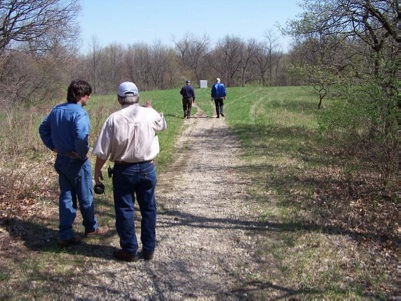
Inspectors approach Plot M monument on April 19, 2006.

Site A is located near 41.702364°N 87.913306°W. Plot M is located near 41.707268°N 87.910516°W.

== See also ==
- Sag Bridge, Illinois
