= Chicago Pile-5 =

Thermal-neutron research reactor at Argonne National Laboratory (1954–1979)

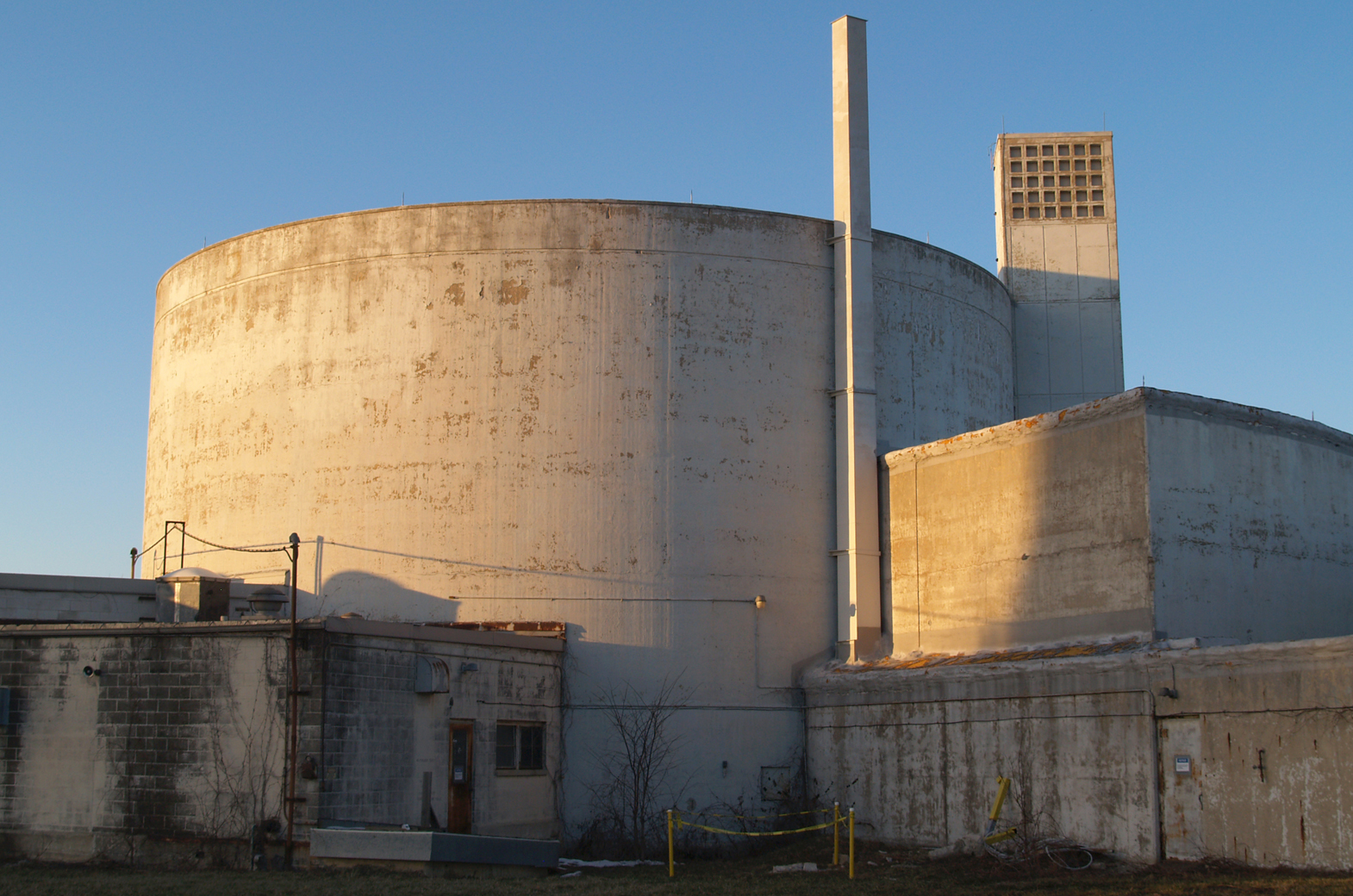
- Pile-5 seen in 2009
- Operating Institution: Argonne National Laboratory
- Location: Argonne National Laboratory, Chicago, Illinois
- Coordinates: 41.705°N 87.984°W
- Type: Heavy water
- First Criticality: 1954
- Shutdown date: 1979

Chicago Pile-5 (CP-5) was the last of the line of Chicago Pile research reactors which started with CP-1 in 1942. The first reactor built on the Argonne National Laboratory campus in DuPage county, it operated from 1954-1979.

CP-5 was a thermal-neutron reactor using enriched uranium as fuel and heavy water as coolant and as a neutron moderator. It produced neutrons for use in research. The reactor had an output rating of 5 megawatts.

Cleanup and decommissioning of the site of CP-5 was started in 1991 completed in 2000. The cleanup process included removal of all contaminated equipment and spent fuel, decontamination of the reactor vessel and associated plumbing, and removal of the spent fuel pool, reactor internals and the hot cell liner. The accessible areas of the structure have been certified as having radiation levels equivalent to background radiation.

== See also ==
- Chicago Pile-1
- Chicago Pile-3
- Experimental Breeder Reactor I (Chicago Pile-4)
