= Mary Frances Winston Newson =

American mathematician (1869-1959)

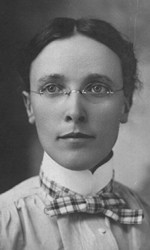
- Born: Mary Frances Winston; August 7, 1869; Forreston, Illinois
- Died: December 5, 1959 (aged 90)
- Occupation: Teacher
- Known for: First person to translate Hilbert's problems into English
- Spouse: Henry Byron Newson
- Children: 3

Mary Frances Winston Newson (August 7, 1869 – December 5, 1959) was an American mathematician. She became the first American woman to receive a PhD in mathematics from a European university, namely the University of Göttingen in Germany. She was also the first person to translate Hilbert's problems into English.

== Early life ==
Mary Newson was born Mary Frances Winston in Forreston, Illinois, the name Newson being the name of the husband she married. She was always known as May by her friends and family. Her parents were Thomas Winston, a country doctor, and Caroline Eliza Mumford. Thomas Winston had been born in Wales but had come to the United States at the age of two years with his parents. Caroline had been a teacher before her marriage, teaching French, art and mathematics. Mary was one of her parents' seven surviving children. She was taught at home by her mother, who had taught herself Latin and Greek so that she could prepare her children for a university education. Her mother had also studied geology, taking a correspondence course with the Field Museum in Chicago.

== Education ==
She and her older brother enrolled at the University of Wisconsin in 1884, when she was 15. She graduated with honors in mathematics in 1889. After teaching at Downer College in Fox Lake, Wisconsin, she applied for a fellowship at Bryn Mawr College in Pennsylvania in 1890. Charlotte Scott was the professor of mathematics at Bryn Mawr and she encouraged Winston to apply again for the fellowship in the following year having narrowly failed to gain the fellowship at her first attempt. Winston taught for a second year at Downer College and she was awarded the fellowship the next year but chose to continue her studies at the University of Chicago which was opening on 1 October 1892, spending the year 1891–1892 at Bryn Mawr College. Winston was awarded a fellowship to study at Chicago and she spent the year 1892–1893 there.

At the International Mathematical Congress held at the 1893 World's Columbian Exposition, she met Felix Klein, who urged her to study at the University of Göttingen. With financial assistance from Christine Ladd-Franklin, she arrived in Germany at the same time as two other American students, Margaret Maltby and Grace Chisholm. Her first paper, on the topic of hypergeometric functions, was published in 1894. The Association of Collegiate Alumnae gave Winston a fellowship to fund her during the academic year 1895–96. She graduated magna cum laude and was awarded her PhD upon the publication of her dissertation, "Über den Hermite'schen Fall der Lamé'schen Differentialgleichungen" (On the Hermitian case of the Lamé differential equations), in the summer of 1896 and was examined in July 1896. She had to have the thesis published before she could be awarded a doctorate and she returned to the United States with the manuscript of the work intending to publish it there. However, no publisher in the United States was able to print the mathematical symbols in her thesis so she had to return it to Göttingen. It was published in 1897 and she received the doctorate magna cum laude in that year. Grace Chisholm had been awarded a doctorate in 1895, so Winston became the second woman, and the first American, student to be awarded a doctorate by Göttingen, as Sofia Kovalevskaya was awarded a doctorate by Göttingen in 1874 but she was never allowed to enroll as a student. She published only one further article, the first English translation of the 1900 lecture by David Hilbert presenting the first ten of his famous problems, issued in the Bulletin of the American Mathematical Society.

== Later life and career ==
After she returned to the United States, Winston was appointed to teach at St Joseph's High School in St Joseph, Missouri in September 1896. After a year Newson became head of the one-person mathematics department at Kansas State Agricultural College (now Kansas State University) in Manhattan, Kansas. In 1900, she left that job and was married on 21 July 1900 to Henry Byron Newson in Chicago. Henry B. Newson (1860–1910) was head of the mathematics department at the University of Kansas and had published the book Continuous groups of projective transformations treated synthetically (1895). After his marriage he published the books: Graphic Algebra for Secondary Schools (1905); The five types of projective transformations of the plane (1895); and Theory of collineations (1911). Mary Newson, as she now became, resigned her position at the Kansas State Agriculture College and over the next ten years they had three children (Caroline born in 1901, Josephine born in 1903, and Henry Winston born in 1909). But Henry B. Newson died of a heart attack in 1910. Although she was not now employed as a mathematician, Winston did translate Hilbert's 'Mathematical problems', which he had delivered in 1900, into English and her 40-page translation (made with Hilbert's permission) was published in the Bulletin of the American Mathematical Society in 1902.

Eventually, Newson found a teaching position in 1913 at Washburn College in Kansas. Newson was one of eight Washburn faculty members to sign a petition defending a political science professor fired because of his political views. All of the signers left Washburn within a year or two, including Newson, who became department head at Eureka College in her native Illinois until her retirement in 1942.

In 1940, she wrote a review of the book Thomas Jefferson and Mathematics, by David Eugene Smith.

== Death ==
After she finished teaching at Eureka College, Newson moved to Lake Dalecarlia in Lowell, Indiana. This was a village beside a picturesque artificial lake which Newson loved and had spent vacations at throughout her life. In 1956, when she was 87 years old, she moved into a nursing home in Poolesville, Maryland, where she was close to her daughter Caroline Beshers. She died one day after the death of her brother Ambrose Paré Winston who had been a professor of economics.

== Honours ==
Newson was one of only 22 women to join the American Mathematical Society before 1900. In 1940, she was honored by the Women's Centennial Congress as one of a hundred women in positions not open to women a century earlier. International relations was a hobby of Newson and her three children started the Mary Winston Newson Memorial Lecture on International Relations at Eureka College.
