= Martin D. Whitaker =

American physicist and academic (1902–1960)

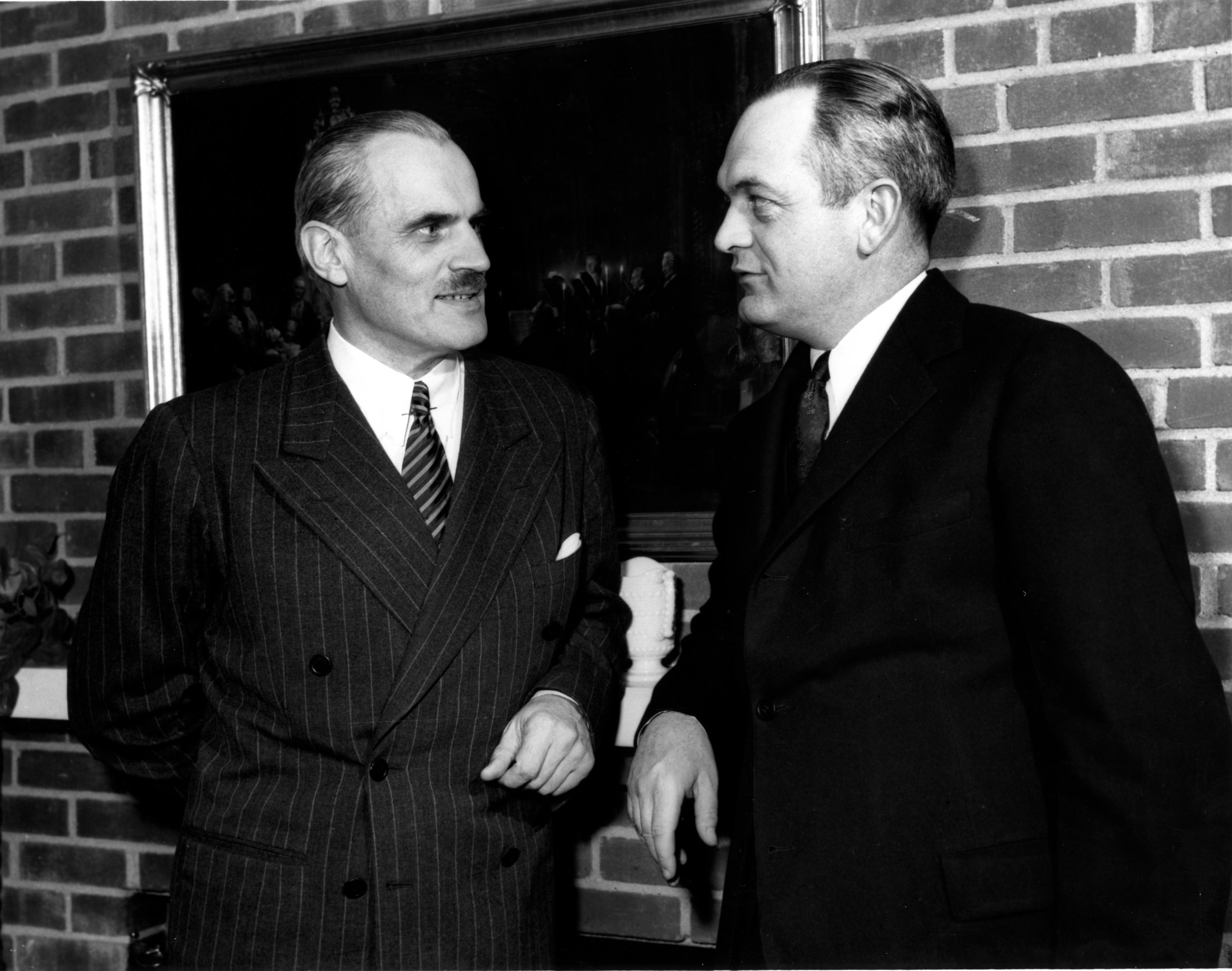
- Whitaker (right) with Arthur Compton in 1946
- Born: June 29, 1902; Ellenboro, North Carolina
- Died: August 31, 1960 (aged 58); Bethlehem, Pennsylvania
- Education: Wake Forest University; University of North Carolina; New York University
- Scientific career
- Fields: Physicist
- Workplaces: New York University; Clinton Laboratories; Lehigh University
- Thesis: Absorption and scattering of neutrons (1935)

Martin Dewey Whitaker (June 29, 1902 – August 31, 1960) was an American physicist who was the first director of the Clinton Laboratories (now the Oak Ridge National Laboratory) during World War II. He served as president of Lehigh University from 1946 until his death in 1960.

== Early life and education ==
Martin Dewey Whitaker was born in Ellenboro, North Carolina, on June 29, 1902, the son of Volney Oscar Whitaker and Florence O. Bridges. He graduated from Boiling Springs High School, later to become Gardner-Webb University, in 1922. He earned a Bachelor of Arts (A.B.) degree from Wake Forest College in 1927. He worked as an instructor at the University of North Carolina from 1928 to 1930, earning a Master of Science (M.S.) degree in physics. He was awarded his Doctor of Philosophy (Ph.D.) from New York University in 1935, writing his thesis on the "Absorption and scattering of neutrons".

== Career ==
Whitaker was acting chairman of the department of physics at New York University until 1942, when he joined the Manhattan Project's Metallurgical Laboratory at the University of Chicago during World War II. In September 1942, Arthur Compton asked him to form the nucleus of an operating staff for the X-10 Graphite Reactor that was to be constructed on Oak Ridge, Tennessee. Whitaker became the first director of the Clinton Laboratories, which later became the Oak Ridge National Laboratory. The first permanent operating staff arrived at X-10 from the Metallurgical Laboratory in Chicago in April 1944, by which time DuPont began transferring its technicians to the site. They were augmented by one hundred technicians in uniform from the Manhattan District's Special Engineer Detachment. By March 1944, there were some 1,500 people working at X-10.

After the war's end, Whitaker left Oak Ridge to take up the post of president of Lehigh University on June 1, 1946. His term as president saw the Lehigh University in a period of great growth and expansion. Its assets nearly tripled, its endowment more than doubled to $18 million, and the number of professors increased by 75 percent. Two new halls of residence, Dravo House and McClintic-Marshall House were built, while many other buildings were renovated. In 1959 he initiated the Centennial development program, which raised over $22 million for faculty salaries and construction that included the University Center, and the Whitaker Laboratory, which would be named in his honor in 1966.

He died of lung cancer in Bethlehem, Pennsylvania, on August 31, 1960. He was survived by his wife, the former Helen Williams, and their two daughters, Margaret and Catherine.

== Notes ==
Preceded by Clement C. Williams	9th President of Lehigh University; 1946–1960	Succeeded by Harvey A. Neville
