= P-9 Project =

World War II heavy water production program

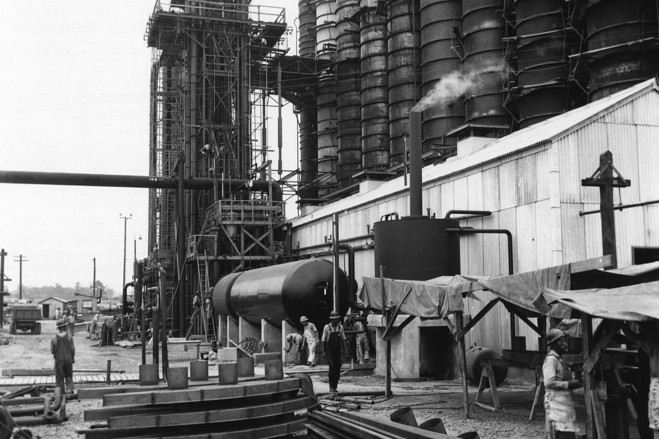
Heavy water production plant at Sylacauga, Alabama

The P-9 Project was the codename given during World War II to the Manhattan Project's heavy water production program. The Cominco operation at Trail, British Columbia, was upgraded to produce heavy water. DuPont built three plants in the United States: at the Morgantown Ordnance Works, near Morgantown, West Virginia; at the Wabash River Ordnance Works, near Dana and Newport, Indiana; and at the Alabama Ordnance Works, near Childersburg and Sylacauga, Alabama. The American plants operated from 1943 until 1945. The Canadian plant at Trail continued in operation until 1956. Three nuclear reactors were built using the heavy water produced by the P-9 Project: Chicago Pile 3 at Argonne, and ZEEP and NRX at the Chalk River Laboratories in Canada.

== Origins ==
Heavy water is a form of water that contains a larger than normal amount of the hydrogen isotope deuterium, also known as heavy hydrogen, rather than the common hydrogen-1 isotope that makes up most of the hydrogen in ordinary water. Deuterium was discovered by Harold Urey in 1931 and he was later able to concentrate it in water. His mentor Gilbert Newton Lewis isolated the first sample of pure heavy water by electrolysis in 1933.

Although a scientific curiosity from the start, considerable interest in heavy water was aroused in 1939 when Hans von Halban and Lew Kowarski suggested that heavy water could be used as a neutron moderator in a nuclear reactor using natural uranium. They carried out experiments on uranium using ordinary water, but had found that the hydrogen atoms absorbed neutrons, thus preventing the desired chain reaction. Heavy water though, was an ideal moderator. The Office of Scientific Research and Development (OSRD) put Hugh S. Taylor, a British physicist at Princeton University in charge of heavy water research. Taylor and Urey began looking at means for producing heavy water on an industrial scale. For his plutonium project, Arthur H. Compton requested 2 stone (28 lb; 13 kg) of it. The heavy water project was codenamed the "P-9 Project" in October 1942.

The problem with using heavy water was that it was scarce, and scientists could not readily acquire the quantities required by a reactor. At Columbia University in the United States, Enrico Fermi and Leó Szilárd attempted to use graphite as a moderator instead. This turned out to be possible, but the graphite had to be very pure, as impurities, particularly boron, tended to absorb neutrons. On 2 December 1942, Fermi's team initiated the first artificial self-sustaining nuclear chain reaction in an experimental reactor known as Chicago Pile-1. For the Manhattan Project, this was a crucial step towards the manufacture of plutonium in a reactor for use in an atomic bomb, but much larger reactors were required for mass production.

== Trail ==
Cominco had been involved in heavy water research since 1934, and produced it at its Teck Cominco smelter plant in Trail, British Columbia. On 26 February 1941, the Canadian National Research Council inquired about its ability to produce heavy water. This was followed on 23 July 1941 by letter from Taylor that offered a National Defense Research Committee (NDRC) contract to produce 2,000 pounds (910 kg), for which the NDRC was prepared to pay $5 per pound for low-grade and $10 for high-grade heavy water. At the time it was selling for up to $1,130 a pound.

Cominco's president, Selwyn G. Blaylock, was cautious. There might be no post-war demand for heavy water, and the patent on the process was held by Albert Edgar Knowles, so a profit-sharing agreement would be required. In response, Taylor offered up $20,000 for plant modifications. There the matter rested until 6 December 1941, when Blaylock had a meeting with the British physicist G. I. Higson, who informed him that Taylor had become discouraged with Cominco, and had decided to find an alternative source of heavy water. Blaylock invited Taylor to visit Trail, which he did from 5 to 8 January 1942. The two soon found common ground. Blaylock agreed to produce heavy water at Trail, and quickly secured approval from the chairman of the board, Sir Edward Beatty. A contract was signed on 1 August 1942.

To the existing $10 million plant consisting of 3,215 cells consuming 75 MW of hydroelectric power, secondary electrolysis cells were added to increase the deuterium concentration in the water from 2.3% to 99.8%. For this process, Taylor developed a platinum-on-carbon catalyst for the first three stages while Urey developed a nickel-chromia one for the fourth stage tower. Seven new parcels of land were acquired totalling 0.474 acres (0.192 ha) were leased by the U.S. government. Construction was undertaken by Stone & Webster. The final cost was $2.8 million. The Canadian Government did not officially learn of the project until August 1942, shortly before construction began the following month. It was completed on 30 June 1943, at a cost of $2,604,622.

Production rose steadily from 15 pounds (6.8 kg) in June 1943 to 326 pounds (148 kg) in January 1944, 1,055 pounds (479 kg) in January 1945 and 1,305 pounds (592 kg) in January 1946. The running cost of the plant averaged $32,979 per month over the period from June 1943 to December 1946, when the Manhattan Project was replaced by the Atomic Energy Commission. This worked out to $39 per pound. Trail's heavy water production continued until 1956.

== American sites ==
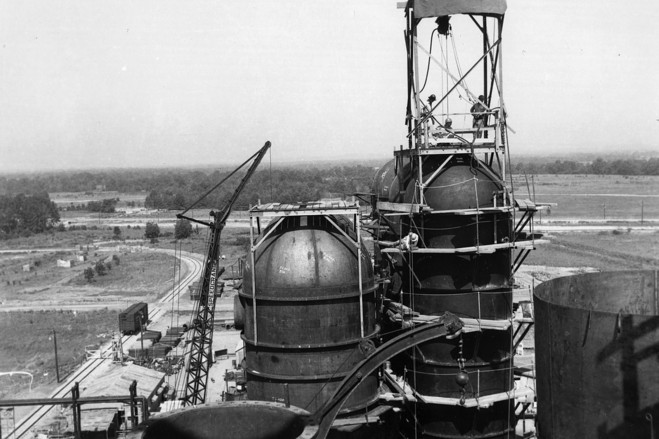
Heavy water production plant at Sylacauga, Alabama

The Director of the Manhattan Project, Brigadier General Leslie R. Groves, Jr., had, in November 1942, recruited DuPont as the prime contractor for the construction of a plutonium production complex. Although DuPont's preferred designs for the nuclear reactors were helium cooled and used graphite as a moderator, DuPont still expressed an interest in using heavy water as a backup, in case the graphite reactor design proved infeasible for some reason. For this purpose, it was estimated that 3 short tons (2.7 t) of heavy water would be required per month. As the plant at Trail, which was then under construction, could produce 0.5 short tons (0.45 t) per month, more capacity was required.

Groves therefore authorized DuPont to establish additional heavy water facilities at the Morgantown Ordnance Works, near Morgantown, West Virginia; at the Wabash River Ordnance Works, near Dana and Newport, Indiana; and at the Alabama Ordnance Works, near Childersburg and Sylacauga, Alabama. Although known as Ordnance Works and paid for under Ordnance Department contracts, they were built and operated by the United States Army Corps of Engineers. Locating them at Ordnance plants saved the cost of acquiring land, since it was already owned by the government, and they already had personnel and utilities, including steam generating equipment. The three American plants used a process different from Trail's; heavy water was extracted by distillation, taking advantage of the slightly higher boiling point of heavy water. This was not considered to be an efficient process, but it was known to work and scale to an industrial process, and therefore represented less risk than other proposals. Morgantown, Wabash and Alabama were expected to produce 0.4 short tons (0.36 t), 1.2 short tons (1.1 t) and 0.8 short tons (0.73 t) respectively of heavy water per month, with a concentration of 99.75%.

=== Morgantown ===
The Morgantown Ordnance Works (MOW) began as an 826-acre (334 ha) chemical production facility operated by DuPont during the Second World War, with construction on the main facility starting in the summer of 1940. Originally producing ammonia for use in the manufacture of explosives, the MOW also produced alcohol, hexamine, and formaldehyde before being expanded to produce heavy water for use in the P-9 Project. Works at Morgantown were undertaken by DuPont under a cost-plus fixed fee contract, as was the works at Wabash and Alabama. Construction commenced on 7 January 1943, and was substantially completed ahead of the 1 September scheduled date. The facilities were progressively brought into operation between 29 May and 28 August 1943. The cost was $3,490,069. DuPont's fixed fee was originally $154,882, but this was voluntarily reduced to $88,588 because the cost of construction was considerably less than the $6,034,000 originally estimated.

The electrolytic finishing plant was established at Morgantown because that plant was under the control of DuPont's Ammonia Division. At this plant the output from the distillation plants, which was about 90% heavy water, was broken down by electrolysis into hydrogen and oxygen. The light hydrogen tends to be drawn off first, leaving the heavy water behind. This process was repeated through several stages to yield a finished product that was 99.75% heavy water. After the water reached a concentration of 99.75%, the heavy water was then transported by rail to the University of Chicago where it was used as a potential moderator for the first nuclear reactors constructed in the United States.

Following the end of the war, DuPont ended their operations at the MOW and the site was leased to various chemical companies until the early 1950s before standing vacant until 1962 when the area was purchased from the United States General Services Administration for the price of $1.25 million by the Morgantown Community Association. The property was then conveyed to the newly created Morgantown Ordnance Works, Inc., owned by local industrialist J.W. Ruby, who began converting the site into an industrial park. In 1984, part of the site was formally proposed to be added to the Environmental Protection Agency's (EPA) Superfund National Priorities List and was added to the list two years later in 1986. Remedy construction began in 2001 and included the consolidation of contaminated materials into an on-site landfill which was covered with a multi-layer cap. The remedy also included long-term monitoring and institutional controls and was completed in 2003. On 21 August 2018, the EPA removed the Ordnance Works Disposal Areas from the Superfund National Priorities List along with eight other sites.

=== Wabash ===
Construction commenced on 23 January 1943, and was substantially completed on 22 October. Stages of the P-9 distillation plant became operational between 17 June and 18 September 1943. Total cost was $7,493,157, including DuPont's fee of $152,472, which was voluntarily reduced from $272,776 because the plant was constructed for substantially less than the allocated $13,665,000.

=== Alabama ===
Construction commenced on 11 February 1943, and was completed on 15 November. Stages of the P-9 distillation plant became operational between 29 May and 4 September 1943. Total cost was $3,466,171, including DuPont's fee of $70,368, which was voluntarily reduced from $184,680 because the plant was constructed for substantially less than the allocated $8,285,000.

== Production ==
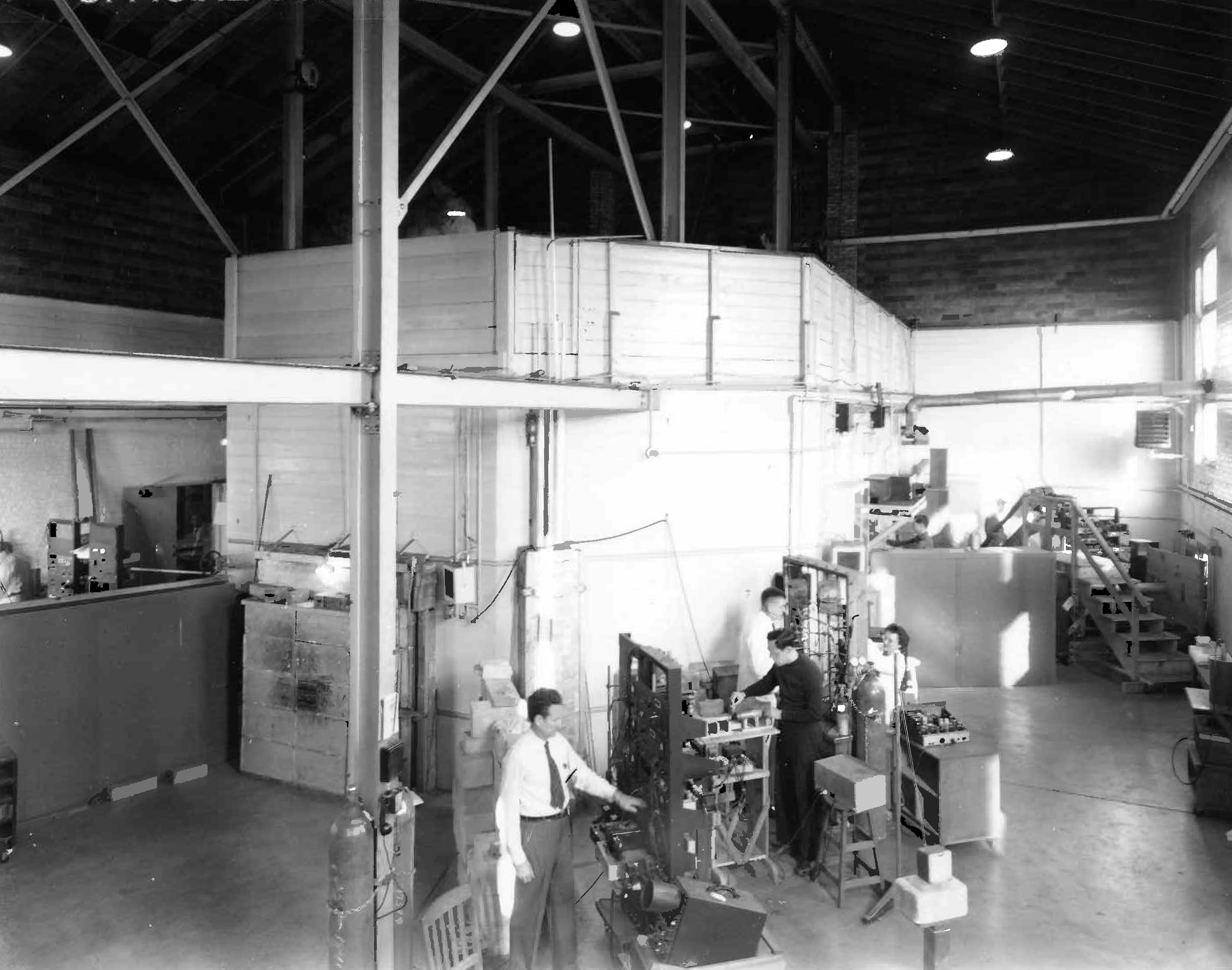
Chicago Pile-3

The three American plants never achieved the intended production of 4,800 pounds (2,200 kg) per month. A series of suggestions for improving production was considered, and the most promising were carried out. The most successful of these was the reconstruction of the first stage towers at Morgantown to reduce leakage, which resulted in a considerable improvement in performance. However, by this time, early 1945, it was decided that production was sufficient, and the expense of doing this at the other plants could not be justified.

The P-9 distillation plant at Alabama was closed in June 1945, that at Wabash in July, and the one at Morgantown in August. The electrolytic finishing plant at Morgantown was closed in September. Intermediate product remaining when the plants were closed was sent to Trail. This resulted in approximately 1,600 pounds (730 kg) of extra production at Trail. Between February 1944 and August 1945, the electrolytic finishing plant at Morgantown, which finished the product for all three plants, produced an average of 2,277 pounds (1,033 kg) per month, for a total of 43,253 pounds (19,619 kg).

The electrolytic finishing plant also processed 3,151 pounds (1,429 kg) from heavy water recovered from Germany by the Manhattan Project's Alsos Mission. The average monthly production cost was $72,000 for Morgantown, $154,000 at Alabama and $197,400 at Wabash, for a total of $423,400. Thus, heavy water cost $186 per pound, excluding the $11,967,000 cost of the plants. If this is included, it cost $550 per pound, compared to $111 per pound at Trail.

Intermediate product was shipped from Wabash and Alabama by rail in sealed metal containers. The finished product was shipped by rail from Morgantown via the Monongahela Railway and Trail via the Canadian Pacific Railway to the Manhattan Project's Metallurgical Laboratory at the University of Chicago. Heavy water from Trail was used for Chicago Pile 3 at Argonne, the first reactor using heavy water and natural uranium. Designed by Eugene Wigner and built under the direction of Walter Zinn, it went critical on 15 May 1944. An allocation of heavy water was used by the Chalk River Laboratories to build ZEEP under Kowarski's direction, which went critical in September 1945. This was followed by its NRX reactor in 1947, which was also moderated by heavy water. Like CP-3 and ZEEP it was used for scientific research, and not for plutonium production.

Demand for heavy water increased in the early 1950s. The heavy water facility at Wabash, now renamed the Dana Plant by the Atomic Energy Commission, was reopened, and DuPont resumed production of heavy water in May 1952. The site was used a pilot plant for a new production process using hydrogen sulphide. The heavy water facility was closed again in early 1957. The facility, and a larger complex at the Savannah River Site had fulfilled its purpose, supplying heavy water for the plutonium production reactors at Savannah River.
