= Chicago Pile-3 =

First heavy water reactor in the world

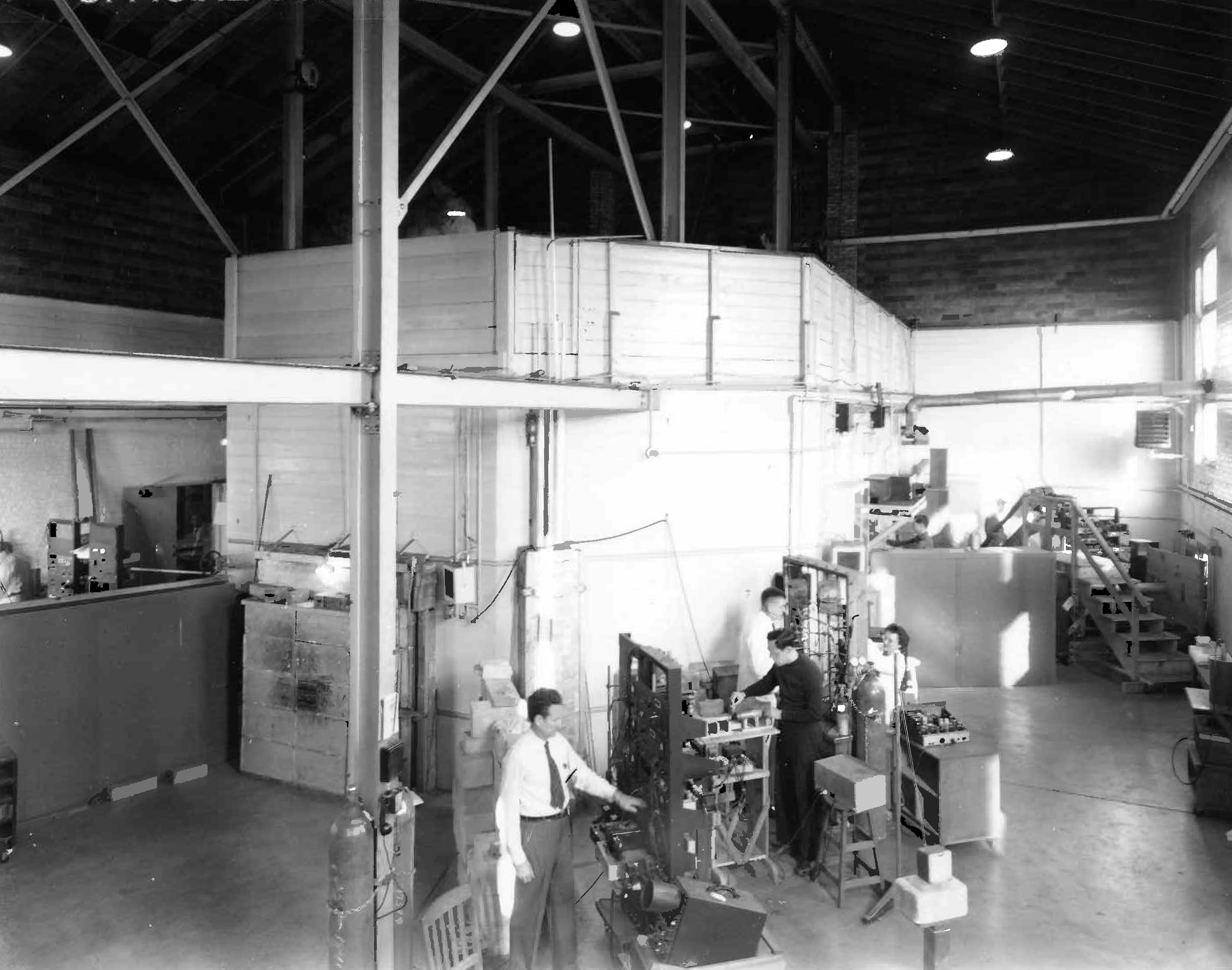
- Chicago Pile-3
- Operating Institution: University of Chicago
- Location: Site A, Chicago, Illinois
- Coordinates: 41°42′7.6″N 87°54′44.2″W
- Type: Heavy water
- First Criticality: 1944
- Shutdown date: 1954

Chicago Pile-3 (CP-3) was the world's first heavy water reactor. One of the first research reactors, it was constructed in 1943 at Site A, a research facility around ten miles from the University of Chicago campus in the city of Chicago. Joining CP-1/CP-2, it first went critical on 15 May 1944, and was at first used in the experimental physics work of the Metallurgical Laboratory for the Manhattan Project. After a rebuilding in 1950, its useful research-life ended when it was deactivated in 1954.

CP-3 was initially fueled with natural uranium and used heavy water as a neutron moderator. In January 1950, the reactor was dismantled due to suspicion of corrosion of the aluminum cladding that surrounded the control rods. The reactor was rebuilt and redesignated CP-3′ (CP-3 prime). It was restarted in May 1950 and operated until 1954. The reactor was authorized to operate up to 300 kilowatts. The two versions of the reactor were used to study physics, separate fission products, recover tritium from irradiated lithium, and study radionuclide metabolism in laboratory animals.

After the reactor was decommissioned, the fuel and heavy water were shipped to the Oak Ridge National Laboratory. Pipes, valves, and building debris were placed in the reactor's containment shell, which was then filled with concrete. The 800-short-ton (730 t) shell was buried on the site in a 40-foot (12 m) deep pit. The site sits within the Palos Forest Preserves, part of the Cook County Forest Preserve system. A historical marker commemorates the site of CP-3 and its sister reactor CP-1/CP-2.

== See also ==
- Chicago Pile-1
- Experimental Breeder Reactor I (Chicago Pile-4)
- Chicago Pile-5
