= Metallurgical Laboratory =

Laboratory at the University of Chicago

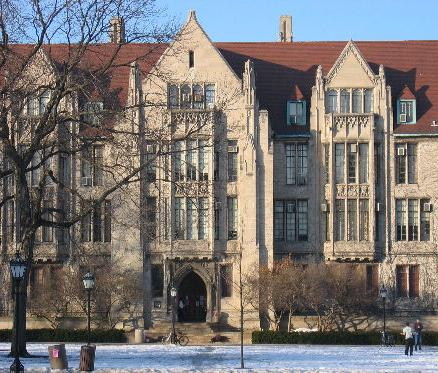
- Eckhart Hall at the University of Chicago was used for the Metallurgical Project's administrative offices
- Established: February 1942–July 1946
- Research type: classified
- Budget: $30.69 million (1943–1946)
- Field of research: Plutonium chemistry and metallurgy, nuclear reactor design
- Director: Richard L. Doan; Samuel K. Allison; Joyce C. Stearns; Farrington Daniels
- Staff: 2,008 on 1 July 1944
- Location: Chicago, Illinois, United States; 41°47′25″N 87°35′56″W
- Operating agency: University of Chicago
- Nobel laureates: Arthur Compton; Enrico Fermi; James Franck; Glenn Seaborg; Eugene Wigner

The Metallurgical Laboratory (or Met Lab) was a scientific laboratory from 1942 to 1946 at the University of Chicago. It was established in February 1942 and became the Argonne National Laboratory in July 1946.

The laboratory was established in February 1942 to study and use the newly discovered chemical element plutonium. It researched plutonium's chemistry and metallurgy, designed the world's first nuclear reactors to produce it, and developed chemical processes to separate it from other elements. In August 1942 the lab's chemical section was the first to chemically separate a weighable sample of plutonium, and on 2 December 1942, the Met Lab produced the first controlled nuclear chain reaction, in the reactor Chicago Pile-1, which was constructed under the stands of the university's old football stadium, Stagg Field.

The Metallurgical Laboratory was established as part of the Metallurgical Project, under the S-1 Committee, and also known as the "Pile" or "X-10" Project, headed by Chicago professor Arthur H. Compton, a Nobel Prize laureate. In turn, it became part of the Manhattan Project – the Allied effort to develop the atomic bomb during World War II. The Metallurgical Laboratory was successively led by Richard L. Doan, Samuel K. Allison, Joyce C. Stearns and Farrington Daniels. Scientists who worked there included Enrico Fermi, James Franck, Eugene Wigner, Glenn Seaborg and Leo Szilard. Compton assigned Robert Oppenheimer to take over the research into bomb design in June 1942, and that became the separate Project Y in November. At its peak on 1 July 1944, the Met Lab had 2,008 staff.

Chicago Pile-1 was soon moved by the lab to Site A, a more remote location in the Argonne Forest preserves, where the original materials were used to build an improved Chicago Pile-2 to be employed in new research into the products of nuclear fission. Another reactor, Chicago Pile-3, was built at the Argonne site in early 1944. This was the world's first reactor to use heavy water as a neutron moderator. It went critical in May 1944, and was first operated at full power in July 1944. The Metallurgical Laboratory also designed the X-10 Graphite Reactor at the Clinton Engineer Works in Oak Ridge, Tennessee, and the B Reactor at the Hanford Engineer Works in the state of Washington.

As well as the work on reactor development, the Metallurgical Laboratory studied the chemistry and metallurgy of plutonium, and worked with DuPont to develop the bismuth phosphate process used to separate plutonium from uranium. When it became certain that nuclear reactors would involve radioactive materials on a gigantic scale, there was considerable concern about the health and safety aspects, and the study of the biological effects of radiation assumed greater importance. It was discovered that plutonium, like radium, was a bone seeker, making it especially hazardous. The Metallurgical Laboratory became the first of the national laboratories, the Argonne National Laboratory, on 1 July 1946. The work of the Met Lab also led to the creation of the Enrico Fermi Institute and the James Franck Institute at the university.

== Origins ==
The discovery of nuclear fission in uranium by German chemists Otto Hahn and Fritz Strassmann in December 1938, and its theoretical explanation (and naming) by Lise Meitner and Otto Frisch soon after, opened up the possibility that neutrons produced by fission could create a controlled nuclear chain reaction. At Columbia University, Enrico Fermi and Leo Szilard began exploring how this might be achieved. In August 1939, Szilard drafted a confidential letter to the President of the United States, Franklin D. Roosevelt, warning of the possibility of a German nuclear weapon project, and convinced his old friend and collaborator Albert Einstein to co-sign it. This resulted in support for research into nuclear fission by the U.S. government.

In April 1941, the National Defense Research Committee (NDRC), asked Arthur Compton, a Nobel-Prize-winning physics professor at the University of Chicago, to report on the uranium program. Niels Bohr and John Wheeler theorized that heavy isotopes with odd atomic numbers, such as plutonium-239, were fissile. Emilio Segrè and Glenn Seaborg at the University of California produced 28 μg of plutonium in the 60-inch cyclotron there in May 1941, and found that it had 1.7 times the thermal neutron capture cross section of uranium-235. While minute quantities of plutonium-239 could be created in cyclotrons, it was not feasible to produce a large quantity that way. Compton conferred with Eugene Wigner from Princeton University about how plutonium might be produced in a nuclear reactor, and with Robert Serber from the University of Illinois about how the plutonium produced in a reactor might then be chemically separated from uranium it was bred from.

On 20 December, soon after the Japanese attack on Pearl Harbor that brought the United States into the war, Compton was placed in charge of the plutonium project. Its objectives were to produce reactors to convert uranium to plutonium, to find ways to chemically separate the plutonium from the uranium, and to design and build an atomic bomb. Although a successful reactor had not yet been built, the scientists had already produced several different but promising design concepts. It fell to Compton to decide which of these should be pursued. He proposed an ambitious schedule that aimed to achieve a controlled nuclear chain reaction by January 1943, and to have a deliverable atomic bomb by January 1945.

Compton felt that having teams at Columbia, Princeton, the University of Chicago and the University of California created too much duplication and not enough collaboration, and he resolved to concentrate the work in one location. Nobody wanted to move, and everybody argued in favor of their own location. In January 1942, soon after the United States entered World War II, Compton decided to concentrate the work at his own location, the University of Chicago, where he knew he had the unstinting support of university administration, whereas Columbia was engaged in uranium enrichment efforts and was hesitant to add another secret project. Other factors contributing to the decision were Chicago's central location and the availability of scientists, technicians and facilities in the Midwest that had not yet been taken away by war work. Housing was more readily available, and an inland city was less vulnerable to enemy attack.

== Personnel ==
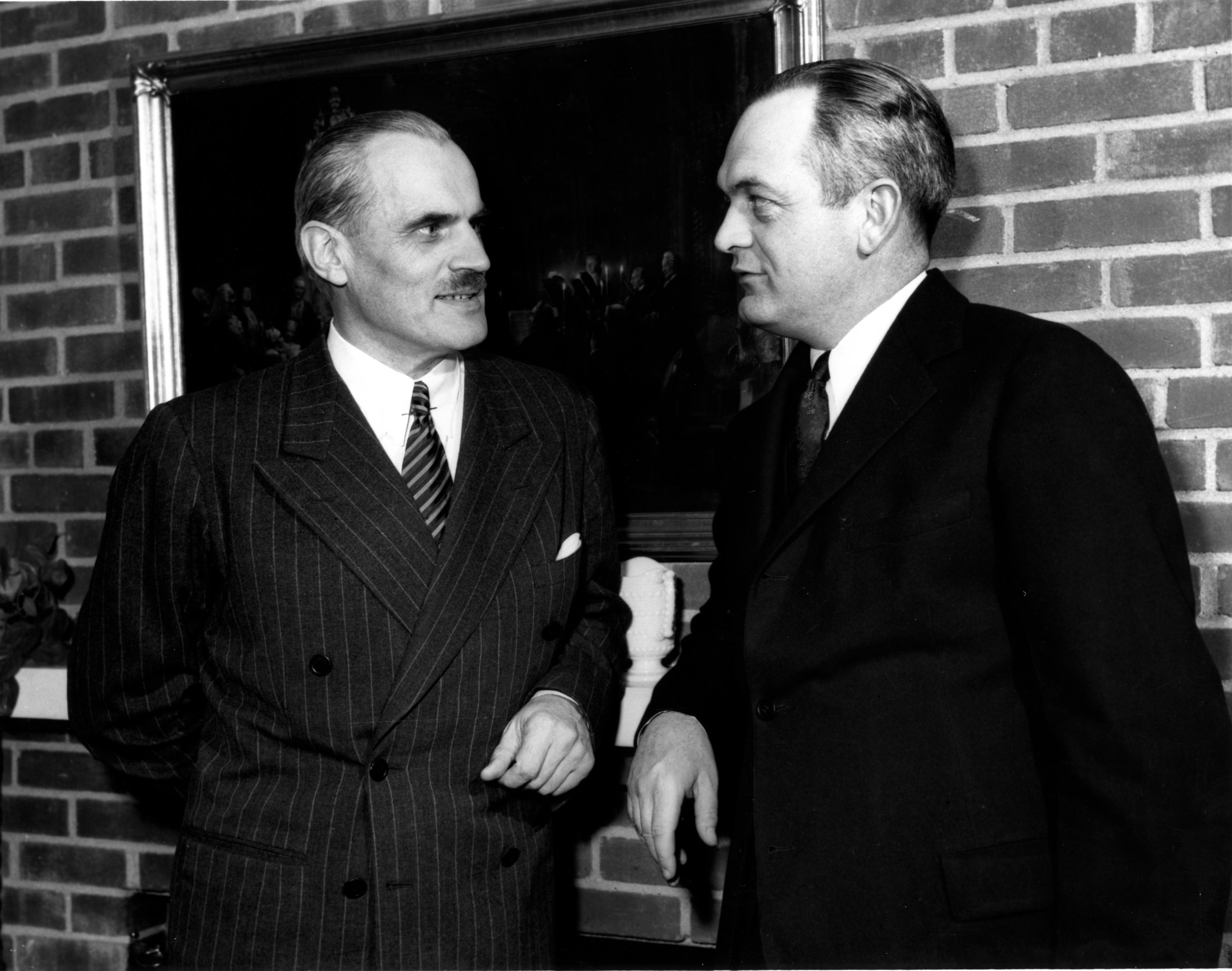
Arthur H. Compton (left) the head of the Metallurgical Project, with Martin D. Whitaker, the director of Clinton Laboratories

The new research establishment was formed in February 1942, and named the "Metallurgical Laboratory" or "Met Lab". Some real metallurgy was carried out, but the name was intended as a cover for its activities. The University of Chicago had been considering establishing a research institute into metals, and indeed would do so after the war, so its creation attracted little attention. Compton's plutonium project then became known as the Metallurgical Project. The Metallurgical Laboratory was administered by the University of Chicago under contract to the Office of Scientific Research and Development (OSRD).

Over 5,000 people in 70 research groups participated in Compton's Metallurgical Project, also known as the "Pile" or "X-10" Project, of whom some 2,000 worked in the Metallurgical Laboratory in Chicago. Despite the good salaries being offered, recruiting was difficult. There was competition for scientists and engineers from other defense-related projects, and Chicago was expensive compared with university towns.

Norman Hilberry was associate director of the Metallurgical Project, and Richard L. Doan was appointed the Director of the Metallurgical Laboratory. While Doan was an able administrator, he had difficulty being accepted as the head of the laboratory, since he was not an academic. On 5 May 1943, Compton replaced him with Samuel K. Allison, and appointed Henry D. Smyth as associate director. Initially there were three physics groups, headed by Allison, Fermi and Martin D. Whitaker. Frank Spedding was in charge of the Chemistry Division. He was later succeeded by Herbert McCoy, and then by James Franck. Compton placed Robert Oppenheimer in charge of the bomb design effort in June 1942. In November 1942, this became a separate project, known as Project Y, which was located in Los Alamos, New Mexico.

After the United States Army Corps of Engineers took over the Manhattan Project in August 1942, the Manhattan District coordinated the work. From 17 February 1943, Compton reported to the director of the Manhattan Project, Brigadier General Leslie R. Groves, Jr., instead of the OSRD S-1 Section. The Manhattan District assumed full responsibility for the Metallurgical Laboratory contract on 1 May 1943. Captain J. F. Grafton was appointed the Chicago Area Engineer in August 1942. He was succeeded by Captain Arthur V. Peterson in December 1942. Peterson remained until October 1944. Captain J. F. McKinley became Chicago Area Engineer on 1 July 1945.

== Buildings ==
At first, most of the Laboratory facilities were provided by the University of Chicago. The physicists took over space under the North and West Stands of Stagg Field and in the Service Building, where there was a cyclotron. The chemists took over the George Herbert Jones Laboratory and the Kent Chemical Laboratory. The health group took space in the Anatomy Building, Drexel House, Billings Hospital and the Killis Laboratory and the administrative offices went into Eckhart Hall. Szilard later wrote that "the morale of the scientists could almost be plotted in a graph by counting the number of lights burning after dinner in the offices at Eckhart Hall." When the project outgrew its space in Eckhart Hall, it moved into the nearby Ryerson Hall. The Metallurgical Laboratory eventually occupied 205,000 square feet (19,000 m^{2}) of campus space. About $131,000 worth of alterations were made to buildings occupied by the laboratory but the University of Chicago also had to make alterations for users displaced by it.

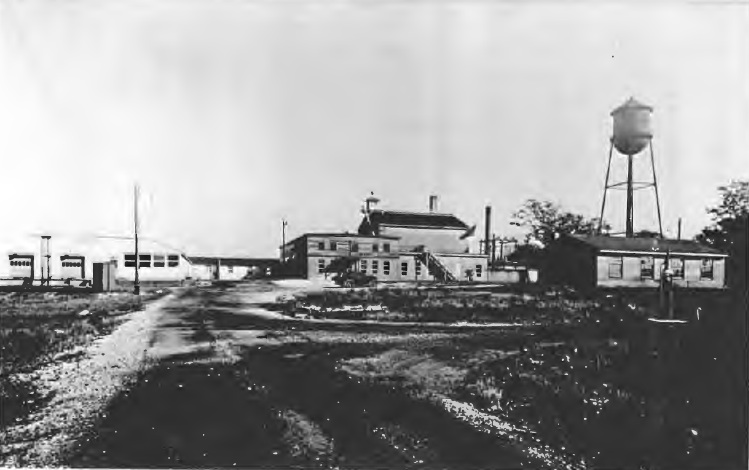
Argonne Laboratory at "Site A"

The University of Chicago made a 0.73-acre (0.30 ha) site occupied by tennis courts available to the Manhattan District on a one dollar lease, for the construction of a new chemistry building with 20,000 square feet (1,900 m^{2}) of space. Stone and Webster commenced work on this in September 1942 and it was completed in December. It was soon found to be too small and an adjacent 0.85-acre (0.34 ha) plot was added to the lease, on which a 30,000-square-foot (2,800 m^{2}) annex was built and completed in November 1943. Extensive work was then carried out on the ventilation system to allow the laboratory to work with plutonium more safely. A site containing an ice house and stables owned by the university in Chicago was made available in April 1943. Known as Site B, it was remodeled to provide 62,670 square feet (5,822 m^{2}) of laboratories and workshops for the health and metallurgy groups. The 124th Field Artillery Armory was leased from the state of Illinois to provide more space in March 1944 and about 360,000 square feet (33,000 m^{2}) of space was leased or built, at a cost of $2 million.

For reasons of safety and security, it was not desirable to locate the facilities for experiments with nuclear reactors in densely populated Chicago. Compton selected a site in the Argonne Forest, part of the Forest Preserve District of Cook County, about 20 miles (32 km) southwest of central Chicago, referred to as 'Site A'. The War Department leased 1,088 acres (440 ha) of land there from Cook County for the duration of the war plus one year for a dollar. Construction of facilities including laboratories and service buildings and an access road was commenced in September 1942 and completed in early 1943. Compton appointed Fermi as the first director of the Argonne Laboratory.

== Reactor development ==
=== Chicago Pile-1 ===
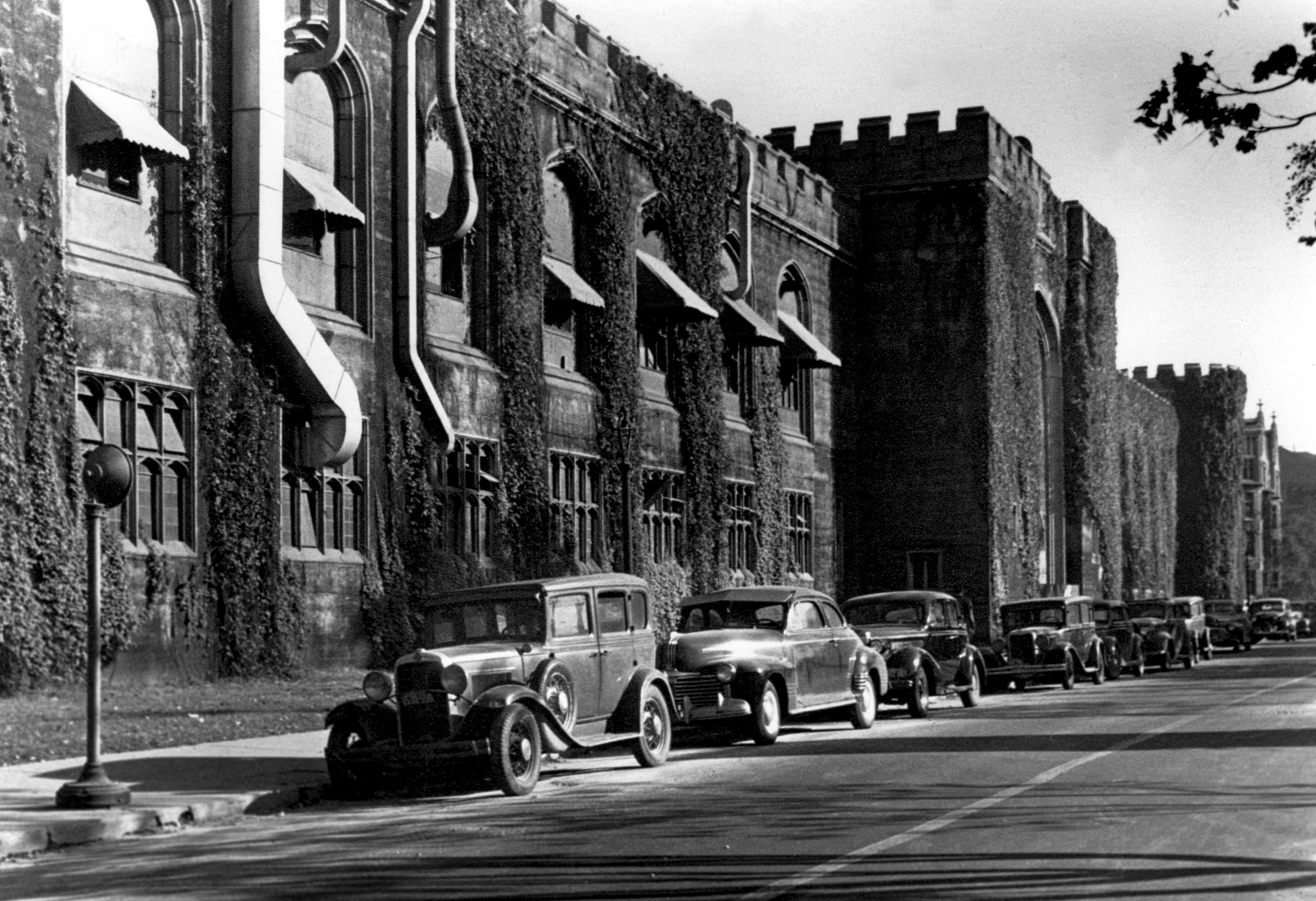
Stagg Field at the University of Chicago. The stadium was razed in 1957.

Between 15 September and 15 November 1942, groups under Herbert L. Anderson and Walter Zinn constructed sixteen experimental reactors (known at the time as "piles") under the Stagg Field stands. Fermi designed a new uranium and graphite pile that could be brought to criticality in a controlled, self-sustaining nuclear reaction. Construction at Argonne fell behind schedule due to Stone & Webster's difficulty recruiting enough skilled workers and obtaining the required building materials. This led to an industrial dispute, with union workers taking action over the recruitment of non-union labor. When it became clear that the materials for Fermi's new pile would be on hand before the new structure was completed, Compton approved a proposal from Fermi to build the pile under the stands at Stagg Field.

Construction of the reactor, known as Chicago Pile-1 (CP-1), began on the morning of 16 November 1942. The work was carried out in twelve-hour shifts, with a day shift under Zinn and a night shift under Anderson. When completed, the wooden frame supported an elliptical-shaped structure, 20-foot (6.1 m) high, 6-foot (1.8 m) wide at the ends and 25 feet (7.6 m) across the middle. It contained 6 short tons (5.4 t) of uranium metal, 50 short tons (45 t) of uranium oxide and 400 short tons (360 t) of graphite, at an estimated cost of $2.7 million. On 2 December 1942, it achieved the first controlled self-sustaining nuclear reaction. On 12 December 1942, CP-1's power output was increased to 200 W, enough to power a light bulb. Lacking shielding of any kind, it was a radiation hazard for everyone in the vicinity. Thereafter, testing was continued at the lower power of 0.5 W.

=== Chicago Pile-2 ===
The operation of Chicago Pile-1 was terminated on 28 February 1943. It was dismantled and moved to Argonne, where the original materials were used to build Chicago Pile-2 (CP-2). Instead of being spherical, the new reactor was built in a cube-like shape, about 25 feet (7.6 m) tall with a base approximately 30 feet (9.1 m) square. It was surrounded by concrete walls 5 feet (1.5 m) thick that acted as a radiation shield, and with overhead protection from 6 inches (15 cm) of lead and 50 inches (130 cm) of wood. More uranium was used, so it contained 52 short tons (47 t) of uranium and 472 short tons (428 t) of graphite. No cooling system was provided as it only ran at a few kilowatts. CP-2 became operational in March 1943.

=== Chicago Pile-3 ===
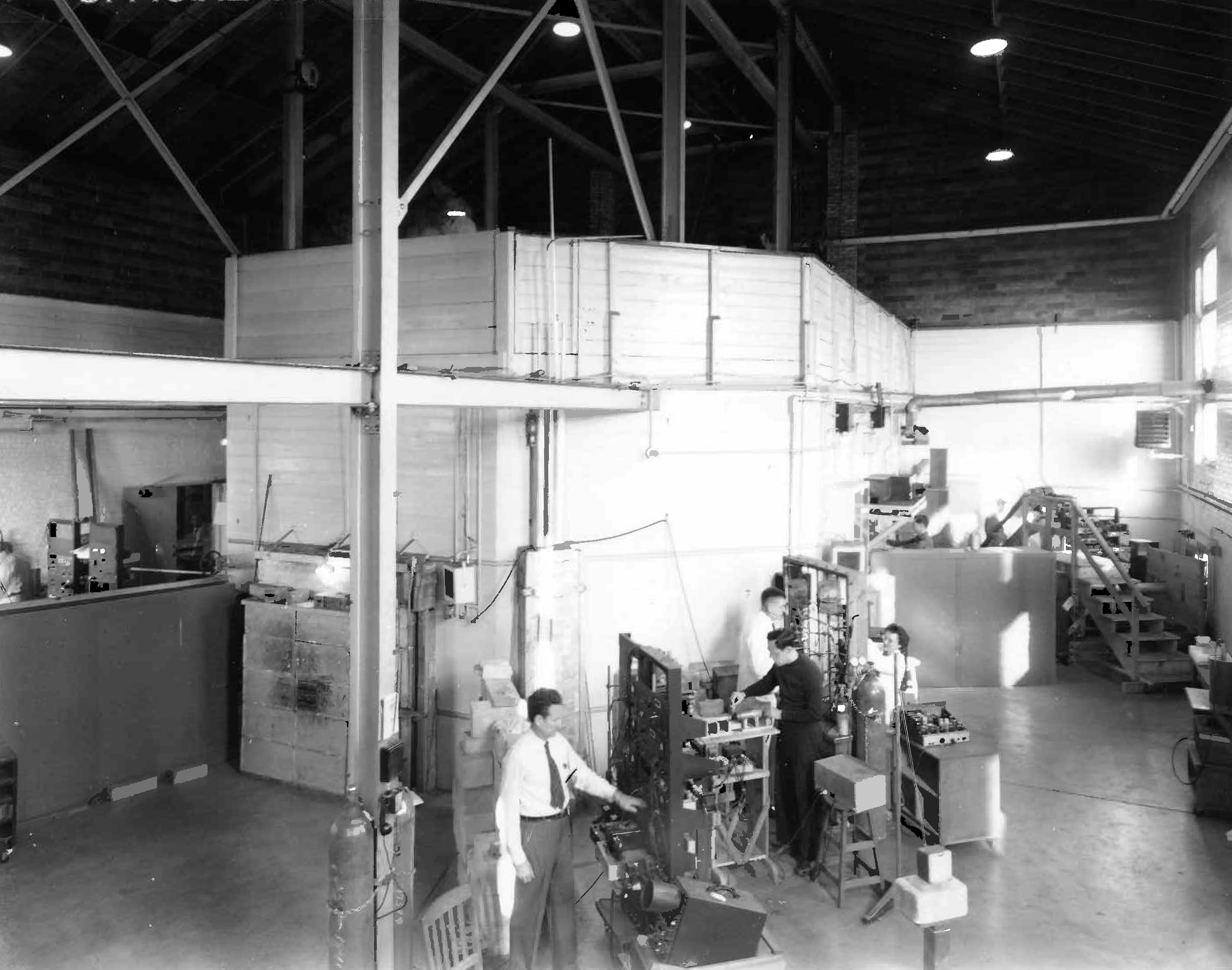
Chicago Pile-3

A second reactor, known as Chicago Pile-3, or CP-3, was built at the Argonne site in early 1944. This was the world's first reactor to use heavy water as a neutron moderator. It had been unavailable when CP-1 was built, but was now becoming available in quantity thanks to the Manhattan Project's P-9 Project. The reactor was a large aluminum tank, 6 feet (1.8 m) in diameter, which was filled with heavy water, which weighed about 6.5 short tons (5.9 t). The cover was pierced by regularly spaced holes through which 121 uranium rods sheathed in aluminum projected into the heavy water. The tank was surrounded by a graphite neutron reflector, which in turn was surrounded by a lead shield, and by concrete. Shielding on the top of the reactor consisted of layers of 1-foot (30 cm) square removable bricks composed of layers of iron and masonite. The heavy water was cooled with a water-cooled heat exchanger. As well as the control rods, there was an emergency mechanism for dumping the heavy water into a tank below. Construction began on 1 January 1944. The reactor went critical in May 1944, and was first operated at full power of 300 kW in July 1944.

During the war Zinn allowed it to be run around the clock, and its design made it easy to conduct experiments. This included tests to investigate the properties of isotopes such as tritium and determine the neutron capture cross section of elements and compounds that might be used to construct future reactors, or occur in impurities. They were also used for trials of instrumentation, and in experiments to determine thermal stability of materials, and to train operators.

=== Production piles ===
The design of the reactors for plutonium production involved several problems, not just in nuclear physics but in engineering and construction. Issues such as the long-term effect of radiation on materials received considerable attention from the Metallurgical Laboratory. Two types of reactors were considered: homogeneous, in which the moderator and fuel were mixed together, and heterogeneous, in which the moderator and fuel were arranged in a lattice configuration. By late 1941, mathematical analysis had shown that the lattice design had advantages over the homogeneous type, and so it was chosen for CP-1, and for the later production reactors as well. For a neutron moderator, graphite was chosen on the basis of its availability compared with beryllium or heavy water.

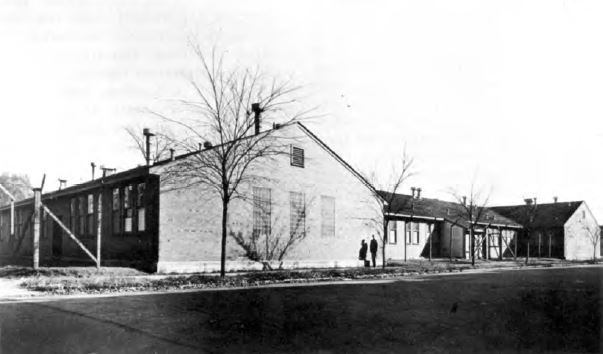
New Chemistry Building on the University of Chicago campus. The Gothic tower of Stagg Field is barely visible in the left background.

The decision of what coolant to use attracted more debate. The Metallurgical laboratory's first choice was helium, because it could be both a coolant and a neutron moderator. The difficulties of its use were not overlooked. Large quantities would be required, and it would have to be very pure, with no neutron-absorbing impurities. Special blowers would be required to circulate the gas through the reactor, and the problem of leakage of radioactive gases would have to be solved. None of these problems were regarded as insurmountable. The decision to use helium was conveyed to DuPont, the company responsible for building the production reactors, and was initially accepted.

In early 1943, Wigner and his Theoretical Group that included Alvin Weinberg, Katharine Way, Leo Ohlinger, Gale Young and Edward Creutz produced a design for a production reactor with water cooling. The choice of water as a coolant was controversial, as it was known to absorb neutrons, thereby reducing the efficiency of the reactor, but Wigner was confident that his group's calculations were correct and that with the purer graphite and uranium that was now available, water would work, while the technical difficulties involved in using helium as a coolant would delay the project.

The design used a thin layer of aluminum to protect the uranium from corrosion by the cooling water. Cylindrical uranium slugs with aluminum jackets would be pushed through channels through the reactor and drop out the other side into a cooling pond. Once the radioactivity subsided, the slugs would be taken away and the plutonium extracted. After reviewing the two designs, the DuPont engineers chose the water-cooled one. In 1959 a patent for the reactor design would be issued in the name of Creutz, Ohlinger, Weinberg, Wigner, and Young.

The use of water as a coolant raised the problem of corrosion and oxidation of the aluminum tubing. The Metallurgical Laboratory tested various additives to the water to determine their effect. It was found that corrosion was minimized when the water was slightly acidic, so dilute sulfuric acid was added to the water to give it a pH of 6.5. Other additives such as sodium silicate, sodium dichromate and oxalic acid were also introduced to the water to prevent a build up of film that could inhibit the circulation of the cooling water. The fuel slugs were given a jacket of aluminum to protect the uranium metal from corrosion that would occur if it came into contact with the water, and to prevent the venting of gaseous radioactive fission products that might be formed when they were irradiated. Aluminum was chosen because the cladding had to transmit heat but not absorb too many neutrons. The aluminum canning process was given close attention, as ruptured slugs could jam or damage the channels in the reactor, and the smallest holes could vent radioactive gases. The Metallurgical Laboratory investigated production and testing regimes for the canning process.

An important area of research concerned the Wigner effect. Under bombardment by neutrons, the carbon atoms in the graphite moderator can be knocked out of the graphite's crystalline structure. Over time, this causes the graphite to heat and swell. Investigation of the problem would take most of 1946 before a fix was found.

== Chemistry and metallurgy ==
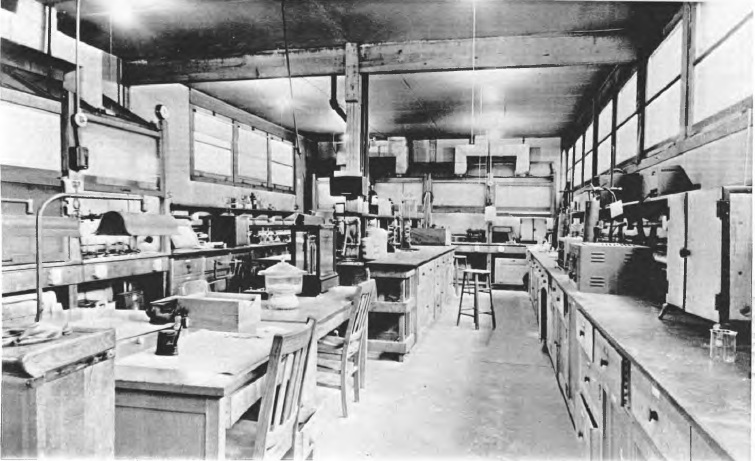
Laboratory at the New Chemistry Building at the University of Chicago

Metallurgical work concentrated on uranium and plutonium. Although it had been discovered over a century before, little was known about uranium, as evidenced by the fact that many references gave a figure for its melting point that was off by nearly 500 °F (280 °C). Edward Creutz investigated it and discovered that at the right temperature range, uranium could be hammered and rolled, and drawn into the rods required by the production reactor design. It was found that when uranium was cut, the shavings would burst into flame. Working with Alcoa and General Electric, the Metallurgical Laboratory devised a method of soldering the aluminum jacket to the uranium slug.

Under pressure to identify a source of processed uranium, in April 1942 Compton, Spedding and Hilberry met with Edward Mallinckrodt at his chemical company's headquarters in St. Louis, Missouri. The company devised and implemented a novel uranium processing technique using ether, submitted successful test materials by mid-May, supplied the material for the first self-sustaining reaction in December, and had satisfied the project's entire order of the first sixty tons before the contract was signed.

The metallurgy of plutonium was completely unknown, for it had only recently been discovered. In August 1942, Seaborg's team chemically isolated the first weighable amount of plutonium from uranium irradiated in the Jones Laboratory. Until reactors became available, minuscule amounts of plutonium were produced in the cyclotron at Washington University in St. Louis. The chemistry division worked with DuPont to develop the bismuth phosphate process used to separate plutonium from uranium.

== Health and safety ==
The dangers of radiation poisoning had become well known due to the experience of the radium dial painters. When it became certain that nuclear reactors would involve radioactive materials on a gigantic scale, there was considerable concern about the health and safety aspects. Robert S. Stone, who had worked with Ernest Lawrence at the University of California, was recruited to head the Metallurgical Project's health and safety program. Simeon Cutler, a radiologist, assumed responsibility for radiation safety in Chicago, before moving on to head the program at the Hanford Site. Groves appointed Stafford L. Warren from the University of Rochester as head of the Manhattan Project's Medical Section. Over time, the study of the biological effects of radiation assumed greater importance. It was discovered that plutonium, like radium, was a bone seeker, making it especially hazardous.

The Metallurgical Laboratory's Health Division set standards for radiation exposure. Workers were routinely tested at University of Chicago clinics, but this could be too late. Personal quartz fiber dosimeters were procured, as were film badge dosimeters, which recorded cumulative dosage. Stone's Health Division worked closely with William P. Jesse's Instrumentation Group in the Physics Division to develop detectors, including portable Geiger counters. Herbert M. Parker created a metric for radiation exposure he called the roentgen equivalent man or rem. After the war, this replaced the roentgen as the standard measure of radiation exposure. Work to assess the toxicity of plutonium got under way when the plutonium semiworks at the Clinton Engineer Works began producing it in 1943. The project set a limit of 5 micrograms (μg) in the body, and work practices and workplaces at Chicago and Clinton were modified to ensure that this standard was met.

== Later activities ==
During 1943 and 1944, the Metallurgical Laboratory focused on first getting the X-10 Graphite Reactor at the Clinton Engineer Works up and running, and then the B Reactor at the Hanford Site. By the end of 1944, the focus had switched to training operators. Much of the chemistry division moved to Oak Ridge in October 1943, and many personnel were transferred to other Manhattan Project sites in 1944, particularly Hanford and Los Alamos. Fermi became a division head at Los Alamos in September 1944, and Zinn became the director of the Argonne Laboratory. Allison followed in November 1944, taking with him many of the Metallurgical Laboratory's staff, including most of the instrument section. He was replaced by Joyce C. Stearns. Farrington Daniels, who became associate director on 1 September 1944, succeeded Stearns as director on 1 July 1945.

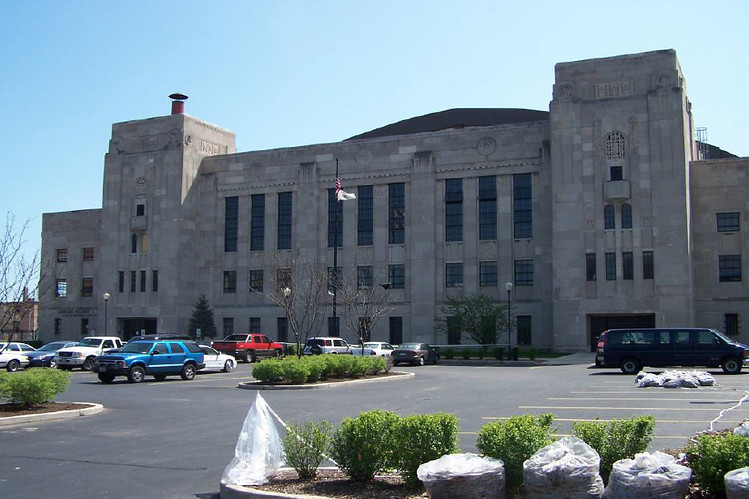
The 124th Field Artillery Armory site in 2006

Where possible, the University of Chicago attempted to re-employ workers who had been transferred from the Metallurgical Laboratory to other projects once their work had ended. Replacing staff was nearly impossible, as Groves had ordered a staffing freeze. The only division to grow between November 1944 and March 1945 was the health division; all the rest lost 20 percent or more of their staff. From a peak of 2,008 staff on 1 July 1944, the number of people working at the Metallurgical Laboratory fell to 1,444 on 1 July 1945.

The end of the war did not end the flow of departures. Seaborg left on 17 May 1946, taking much of what remained of the chemistry division with him. On 11 February 1946, the Army reached an agreement with University President Robert Hutchins for the staff and equipment of the Metallurgical Project to be taken over by a regional laboratory based at Argonne, which the university still manages. On 1 July 1946, the Metallurgical Laboratory became Argonne National Laboratory, the first designated national laboratory, with Zinn as its first director. The new laboratory had 1,278 staff on 31 December 1946, when the Manhattan Project ended, and responsibility for the national laboratories passed to the Atomic Energy Commission, which replaced the Manhattan Project on 1 January 1947. The work of the Metallurgical Laboratory also led to the founding of the Enrico Fermi Institute, as well as the James Franck Institute, at the University of Chicago.

Payments made to the University of Chicago under the original 1 May 1943 non-profit contract totaled $27,933,134.83, which included $647,671.80 in construction and remodeling costs. The contract expired on 30 June 1946, and was replaced by a new contract, which ended on 31 December 1946. A further $2,756,730.54 was paid under this contract, of which $161,636.10 was spent on construction and remodeling. An additional $49,509.83 was paid to the University of Chicago for the restoration of its facilities.

In 1974, the United States government began cleaning up the old Manhattan Project sites under the Formerly Utilized Sites Remedial Action Program (FUSRAP). This included those used by the Metallurgical Laboratory. Stagg Field had been demolished in 1957, but 23 locations in Kent Laboratory were decontaminated in 1977, and another 99 at the Eckhart, Ryerson, and the Jones Laboratory in 1984. About 600 cubic feet (17 m^{3}) of solid and three 55-gallon drums of liquid waste were collected and shipped to various sites for disposal. The Atomic Energy Commission terminated its lease on the Armory site in 1951, and it was restored to the state of Illinois. Testing in 1977, 1978 and 1987 indicated residual levels of radioactivity that exceeded Department of Energy guidelines, so decontamination was carried out in 1988 and 1989, after which the site was declared suitable for unrestricted use.
