= Haiyan Gao (physicist) =

Chinese-American nuclear physicist

- Education: Tsinghua University (China, B.S., 1988) California Institute of Technology (Ph.D., 1994)
- Scientific career
- Workplaces: Professor of Physics (Duke University, Physics, Trinity College of Arts & Sciences) Henry W. Newson Distinguished Professor of Physics (Duke University, Physics, Trinity College of Arts & Sciences 2012 - Present)

Haiyan Gao (Chinese: 高海燕) is a Chinese-American nuclear physicist whose research concerns the structure of nucleons, quantum chromodynamics, and low-energy fundamental symmetries and symmetry violations, and has included accurate measurements of the size of protons. She is the Henry W. Newson Distinguished Professor of Physics at Duke University, and associate laboratory director for nuclear and particle physics at the Brookhaven National Laboratory. Beyond her research in physics, she is also known as having a "keen interest in promoting diversity, equity, and inclusion in the sciences".

== Education and career ==
Gao grew up in Shanghai, and was encouraged to go into science by her father and by a female high school physics teacher. She studied physics at Tsinghua University, graduating in 1988, and came to the US for graduate study in physics at the California Institute of Technology, completing her doctorate there in 1994. Her dissertation, Measurement of the neutron magnetic form factor from inclusive quasielastic scattering of polarized electrons from polarized 3HE, was supervised by Robert D. McKeown.

She became a researcher at Argonne National Laboratory and then a faculty member at the Massachusetts Institute of Technology before moving to Duke University as an associate professor in 2002. She became chair of the physics department at Duke in 2011, was named Henry W. Newson Distinguished Professor of Physics in 2012, and served as vice chancellor for academic affairs at Duke Kunshan University from 2015 to 2019. She became associate laboratory director for nuclear and particle physics at the Brookhaven National Laboratory in 2021, while continuing to keep her position at Duke.

== Recognition ==
Gao was named a Fellow of the American Physical Society (APS) in 2007, after a nomination from the APS Division of Nuclear Physics, "for her extensive contributions to understanding the quark/hadron transition region and for determinations of the nucleon electromagnetic form factors".
