= Palos Forest Preserves =

Cluster of nature reserves in Cook County, Illinois

- IUCN category V (protected landscape/seascape)
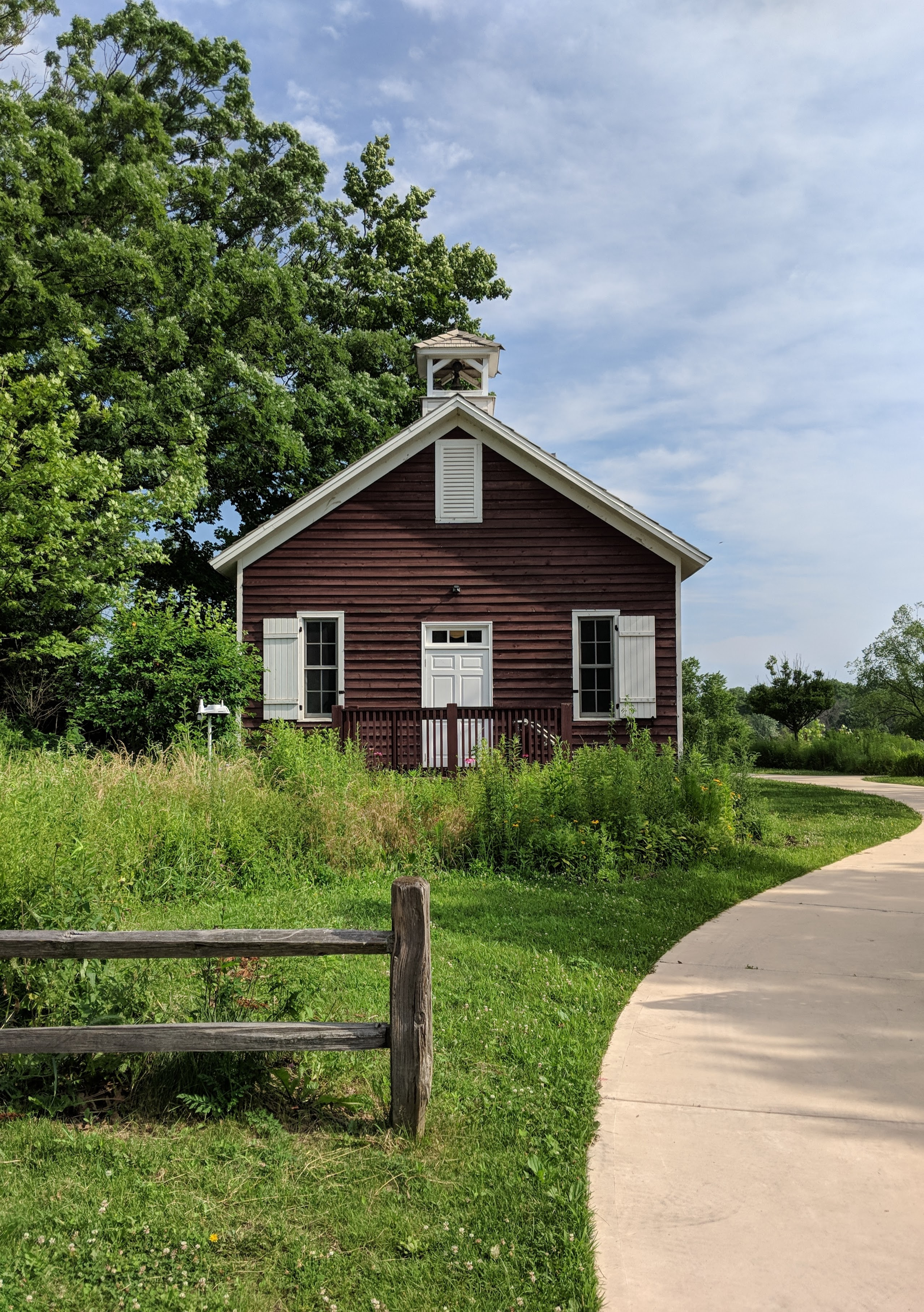
- Little Red Schoolhouse Nature Center

- Location within Illinois Location within the United States
- Location: Cook County, Illinois
- Nearest city: Palos Township, Cook County, IL
- Coordinates: 41°42′28″N 87°52′25″W
- Area: 15,000 acres (61 km^{2})
- Governing body: Forest Preserve District of Cook County

The Palos Forest Preserves are 15,000 acres of forest preserves in the Forest Preserve District of Cook County, located principally in Palos Township, Illinois.

During the 1930s, the area of the Palos Preserves south of Archer was known as the Argonne Forest. This commemorated the battleground of the Meuse–Argonne offensive where over one million Americans fought during World War I. During World War II, Argonne Forest land leased to the Army Corps of Engineers became Site A, a research facility where experimental nuclear reactors built for the Manhattan Project helped in the development of the first nuclear weapons.

The Argonne Forest area is known to geologists as Mount Forest Island, an area which, during the Last Glacial Period, formed a triangular island 6 miles (9.7 km) long and 4 miles (6.4 km) wide, rising 80 to 120 feet (24 to 37 m) above the waters of the surrounding ice-age Lake Chicago.

The Palos Preserves feature the Palos Trail System, the forest district's largest multi-trail system. The system comprises some 40 miles of unpaved trails, connected to each other by many intersections. The longest trail, "Yellow Unpaved" is 9.2 miles long, while "Brown Unpaved" is the shortest, at 1.1 miles. Trails are made for hiking, bicycle riding, horseback riding, and, in the winter, even skiing. There are sixteen entrances to the system which, along with the preserves as a whole, are open from dawn to dusk each day.

The 6,600-acre Mount Forest Island area was, in 2021, designated an Urban Night Sky Place by the International Dark-Sky Association. It is the largest such Urban Night Sky Place designation in the world.

Communities adjoining the preserves are Palos Hills, Palos Park, Hickory Hills, and Willow Springs.

== Visitor features ==
=== Camp Bullfrog Lake ===
This campground has year-round camping. It has campsites for tents, RVs, as well as large and small cabins. One needs to make a reservation in advance. They also offer kayak rentals for registered campers. It has a camp store and shower facilities.

=== Camp Kiwanis Equestrian Center ===
It's a place to rent horses for horseback riding near some of the trails.

=== Fishing lakes ===
There are many lakes to fish at in the trail system. Saganashkee Slough is the largest one. Maple Lake, Bullfrog Lake, Tomahawk Slough, Long John Slough, and Horse Collar Slough, are some of the other larger ones.

=== Little Red Schoolhouse Nature Center ===
The building was a regular school from 1886 to 1948, and it became a learning center for children and adults starting in 1955. It is now open year-round but closed on Fridays. At this center one can learn things about nature of the surrounding area, and as well as the plants and animals that live there. Many schools have educational field trips at this nature center for free. There are several walking trails that start at the Schoolhouse where kids can go exploring along one of these trails, you can find a 6,000 square foot garden.

=== Maple Lake ===
At the Maple Lake Boating Center you can rent canoes, kayaks, and row boats. They are open from April until October 6 days a week while being closed only on Tuesdays. It also has an overlook area for scenic viewing as well as a mountain bike staging area.

=== Picnic groves ===
There are many wooded areas with picnic tables, both with and without shelters. A permit, and an advance reservations are required to hold parties. The locations, which vary in size, can hold up to several hundred people.

- Buffalo Woods
- Country Lane Woods
- Hidden Pond East
- Pioneer Woods
- Pulaski Woods
- Spears Woods
- Willow Springs Woods
- Wolf Road Woods

=== Red Gate Woods ===
Red Gate Woods is the burial place of Chicago Pile-1, the world's first nuclear reactor. Constructed as part of the Manhattan Project, in 1943 the reactor was transferred from the University of Chicago to the Forest Preserve District for further experimental work. Historical markers at Site A indicate where the remains of the reactor are buried. The burial site has a granite marker at its center and is perfectly safe to visit, but there is still some radioactive contamination underground and Tritium still leaches (at very low levels) into the nearby Des Plaines River.

=== Saganashkee Slough ===
Saganashkee Slough is a 377-acre man-made lake. At its largest depth it is 6.3 feet deep. It has 3 entrances: East, Central, and a boat launch entrance. Starting at the East entrance, there is a path used for hiking along the southern part of the lake, and it goes for about 3 miles.
