= Elizabeth Riddle Graves =

American nuclear physicist (1916–1972)

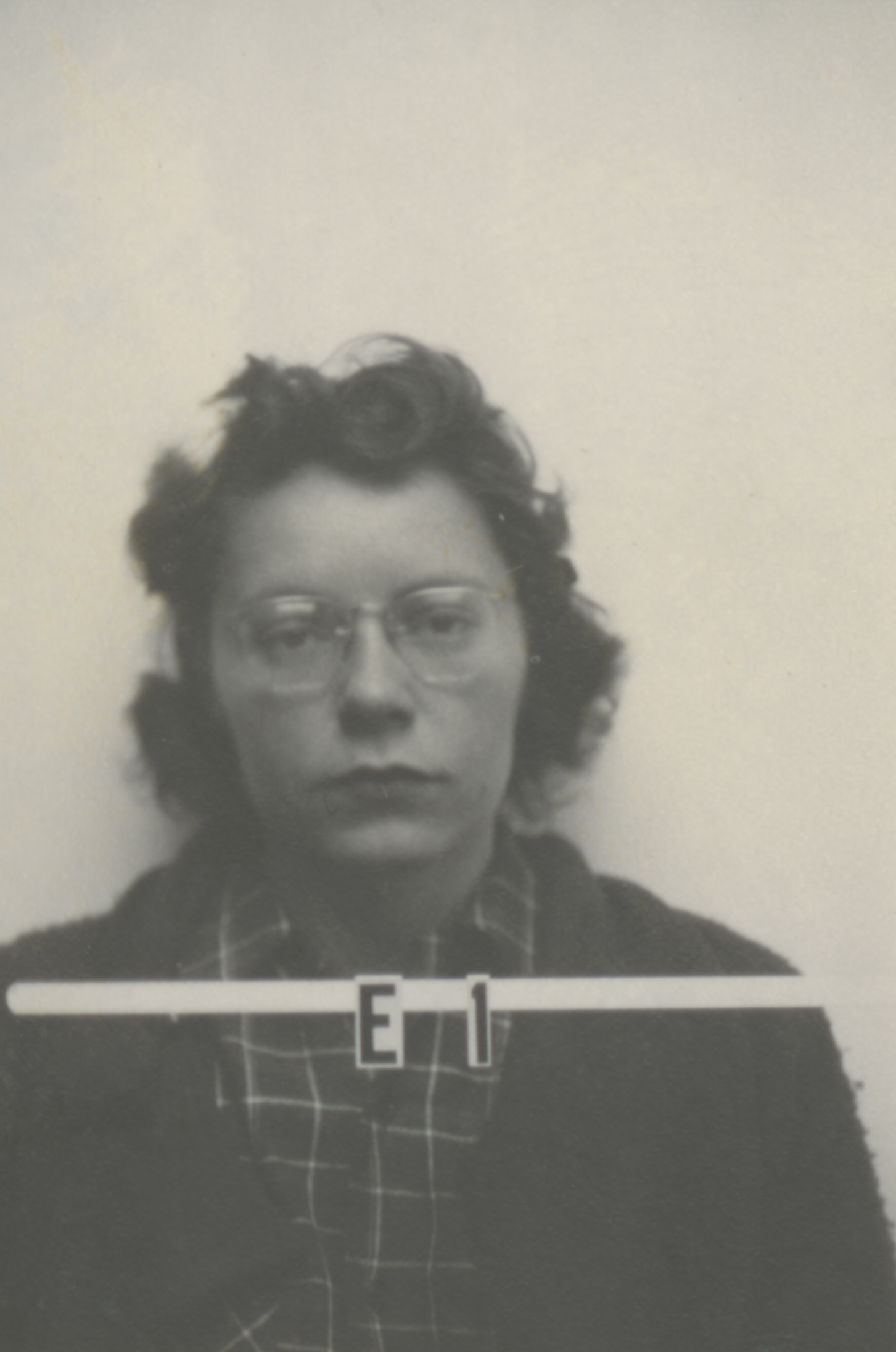
- Graves's Los Alamos badge
- Born: 23 January 1916; Nashville, Tennessee, US
- Died: 6 January 1972 (aged 55); Albuquerque, New Mexico, US
- Education: University of Chicago
- Known for: Physics of neutrons
- Scientific career
- Fields: Physics
- Workplaces: Los Alamos Scientific Laboratory
- Thesis: Energy Released from Be 9 (d, α) Li 7 and the Production of Li 7 (1940)
- Doctoral advisor: Samuel K. Allison

Elizabeth Riddle Graves (23 January 1916 – 6 January 1972) was an American nuclear physicist who pioneered the physics of neutrons and the detection and measurement of fast neutrons. She served at the Manhattan Project's Metallurgical Laboratory and the Los Alamos Laboratory during World War II. After the war, she became a group leader in the experimental physics division at Los Alamos.

== Life and education ==
Elizabeth Riddle was born in Nashville, Tennessee, on 23 January 1916 to James Marion Riddle from South Carolina and Georgia Clymetra Boykin from Arkansas. She had two brothers, James Marion Riddle Jr. and John Burwell Boykin Riddle. Around 1921, the Riddle family moved to Chicago, Illinois.

Graves entered the University of Chicago, where she was known as "Diz". She earned her Bachelor of Science degree in physics in 1936, and developed a keen interest in the physics of neutrons, particularly the detection and measurement of fast neutrons.

While there, she met and married Alvin C. Graves, a fellow physics major. In 1939, Alvin took a position at the University of Texas, but Elizabeth was unable to secure a job there as well due to its anti-nepotism rules, which tended to discriminate against women.

Graves earned her PhD at the University of Chicago in 1940, writing her thesis on the "Energy Released from Be 9 (d, α) Li 7 and the Production of Li 7" under the supervision of Samuel K. Allison.

== Manhattan Project ==
In 1942, Graves joined the Manhattan Project's Metallurgical Laboratory, working with Enrico Fermi on the calculations involved in determining the feasibility of a nuclear chain reaction, which eventually led to the development of Chicago Pile-1, the world's first nuclear reactor.

In 1943, Elizabeth Graves joined the Manhattan Project's Los Alamos Laboratory in New Mexico. Alvin Graves, who was recruited first, insisted that Elizabeth be allowed to work at Los Alamos as a condition of his participation in the project. According to Howes and Herzenberg in 2003, even if Alvin had not insisted, Elizabeth "probably would have been recruited anyway". She was one of the few scientists who knew about fast neutron scattering, which was crucial to nuclear weapon design, and who knew how to operate the Cockcroft–Walton accelerator that had been brought from the University of Illinois.

Employed as a "scientist", which was a high-ranking role in the project as compared to "associate scientist" or "junior scientist", Graves worked as a member of R-division. She contributed greatly to the Project, including measuring cross-sections pertaining to nuclear reactions, measuring neutron multiplication effects in uranium metal, and investigating the different neutron scattering properties of tamper materials considered for use in atomic weapons. She worked on selecting a neutron reflector to "surround the core of the atomic bomb".

At the time of the Trinity nuclear test in 1945, Graves was seven months pregnant with her first child. The Graves family therefore requested that they be assigned to a post far from the blast. They listened to Allison's countdown to the explosion on the radio, and using Geiger counters, they monitored the test's radioactive fallout, which took until the afternoon to reach them. Graves finished an experiment while in labor, timing her contractions with a stopwatch. The child was a healthy daughter, Marilyn Edith. Elizabeth and Alvin had two more children, Alvin Palmer and Elizabeth Anne.

== Post-war ==
Elizabeth and Alvin Graves remained at Los Alamos after the war.

On 21 May 1946, Alvin was in the room with seven other men when Canadian physicist Louis Slotin accidentally slipped and filled the room with a "blue ionization glow" during a demonstration of what became known as the demon core. Slotin knew he had absorbed a fatal dose of radiation, and Alvin Graves was standing the closest to Slotin when the incident occurred. Louis Slotin asked Elizabeth Graves to calculate whether or not a human could survive that dosage of radiation, referring to her husband, without telling her about the accident. Elizabeth was a self-proclaimed stoic, but "she froze when she learned who the subject of her calculation was". Alvin developed acute radiation sickness and was hospitalized for several weeks. He survived but had chronic neurological and vision problems.

In 1950, Graves became a group leader in the experimental physics division at Los Alamos, and researched neutron interactions with matter and material.

Graves died of cancer at age 55 on 6 January 1972, at Bataan Memorial Hospital in Albuquerque, New Mexico. Alvin had died in 1965 of a heart attack. Both were interred at Guaje Pines Cemetery in Los Alamos.

== Personality ==
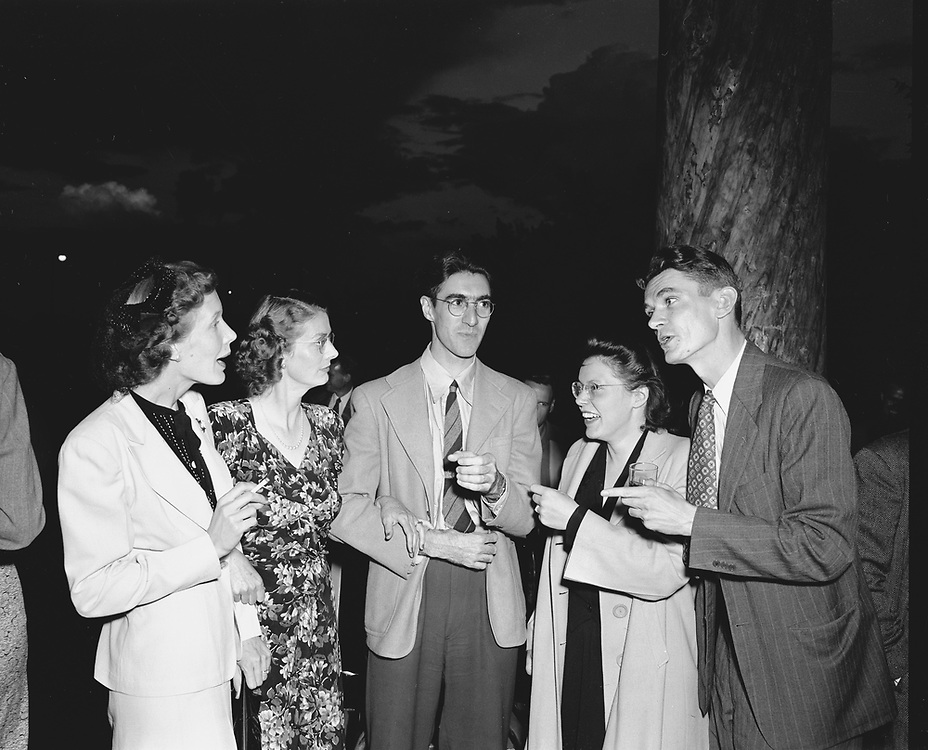
Cocktail party at Fuller Lodge, 1946: Betty Brixner (wife of Berlyn Brixner), unknown woman, Robert D. Richtmyer, Elizabeth Riddle Graves, Charles Critchfield.

Colleagues described her as a "very" hard worker and someone who was "very good at her job". Graves was a self-proclaimed Stoic, and reportedly once described the atomic bombing of Hiroshima as being no worse than (an attack by) napalm. Despite having what was described as a conventional outlook, she was an independent thinker and was able to assert her point of view when she thought it necessary.

Graves was said to have a sense of humor. One story told by her colleagues was that she once had a bet with them that she could persuade a "very proper" European physicist to go through a door before her (as was customary for males to allow a woman through a door before them). She won the bet by telling the man that she had ripped her dress and "that modesty dictated that he go first".

== Select publications ==
=== Patents ===
- Low voltage 14 MeV neutron source.

=== Dissertation and thesis ===
- Energy Released from Be 9 (d, α) Li 7 and the Production of Li 7. 1940.

==== Thesis ====
The α-particles from Be9(d,α)Li7 have been investigated with a variable air pressure absorption cell, ionization chamber and linear amplifier. It has been established that there are two groups of α-particles differing at 760 mm pressure and 15°C by 3.08±0.10 mm range reduced to zero bombarding voltage. The groups have been shown to be associated with the production of Li7 in the ground state and in an excited state. At 239 kv bombarding voltage, the excited state is formed 1.7 times as often as the ground state. The energy balance, Q, associated with the production of the ground state has been determined to be 7.093±0.022 Mev. The energy of the excited level has been determined to be 494±16 kev. The total yield curve for α-particles has been investigated from 235 kv to 390 kv bombarding voltage. The measured value for the energy of the excited level in Li7 is discussed in connection with values from other reactions in which Li7 is an end product and with γ-ray measurements of the level.

=== Papers ===
==== 1930s–1940s ====
- Allison, Samuel K., Graves, Elizabeth R., Skaggs, Lester S., & Smith Jr, Nicholas M. (1939). A Precise Measurement of the Mass Difference Be 9 4—Be 8 4; The Stability of Be 8 4. Physical Review. 55(1): 107.
- Allison, S. K., Graves, E. R., & Skaggs, L. S. (1940). Alpha-Particle Groups from the Disintegration of Beryllium by Deuterons. Physical Review. 57(2): 158.
- Graves, A. C., Graves, E. R., Coon, J. H., & Manley, J. H. (January 1946). Cross Section of D (D, P) H-3 Reaction. Physical Review. 70(1-2): 101.
- Manley, J. H., Coon, J. H., & Graves, E. R. (January 1946). Cross Section of D (D, N) He-3 Reaction. Physical Review. 70(1-2): 101.
- Graves, E. R., & Coon, J. H. (January 1946). Disintegrations of Neon and Argon by dd Neutrons. Physical Review. 70(1-2): 101.
- Manley, J. H., Agnew, H. M., Barschall, H. H., Bright, W. C., Coon, J. H., Graves, E. R., Jorgensen, T. & Waldman, B. (1946). Elastic Backscattering of d− d Neutrons. Physical Review. 70(9-10): 602.
- Barschall, Henry Herman, Battat, M. E., Bright, W. C., Graves, E. R., Jorgensen, T., & Manley, J. H. (1947). Measurement of Transport and Inelastic Scattering Cross Sections for Fast Neutrons. II. Experimental Results. Physical Review. 72(10): 881.
- Graves, E. R. (1949). Mayer. Physical Review. 76(1): 183.
- Graves, E. R., Rodrigues, A. A., Goldblatt, M., & Meyer, D. I. (1949). Preparation and use of tritium and deuterium targets. Review of Scientific Instruments. 20(8): 579-582.am

==== 1950s–1960s ====
- Coon, J. H., Graves, E. R., & Barschall, H. H. (1952). Total Cross Sections for 14-MeV Neutrons. Los Alamos Scientific Laboratory of the University of California.
- Graves, E. R., & Rosen, L. (January 1952). Energy Spectrum of Neutrons from the Interaction of 14-Mev Neutrons with C, Al, Fe, Cu, Zn, Ag, Cd, Sn, Au, Pb, and Bi. Physical Review. 87(1): 239.
- Coon, J. H., Graves, E. R., & Barschall, H. H. (1952). Total Cross Sections for 14-Mev Neutrons. Physical Review. 88(3): 562.
- Phillips, D. D., Davis, R. W., & Graves, E. R. (1952). Inelastic Collision Cross Sections for 14-Mev Neutrons. Physical Review. 88(3): 600.
- Forbes, S. G., Graves, E. R., & Little, R. N. (1953). Low Voltage 14‐Mev Neutron Source. Review of Scientific Instruments. 24(6): 424-427.
- Graves, E. R., & Rosen, Louis. (1953). Distribution in Energy of the Neutrons from the Interaction of 14-MeV Neutrons with some Elements. Physical Review. 89(2): 343.
- Graves, E. R., & Davis, Roland W. (1955). Cross sections for nonelastic interactions of 14-Mev neutrons with various elements. Physical Review. 97(5): 1205.
- Battat, M. E., & Graves, E. R. (1955). Gamma Rays from 14-Mev Neutron Bombardment of C 12. Physical Review. 97(5): 1266.
- McDole, C. J., Graves, E. R., & Davis, R. W. (1955). Calibration of a Mock Fission Neutron Source by Indium Resonance Mapping of the Standard Graphite Pile (No. LA-1982). Los Alamos Scientific Lab., New Mexico.
- Seagrave, J. D., Graves, E. R., Hipwood, S. J., & McDole, C. J. (1958). D (d, n) 3 He and T (d, n) 4 He Neutron Source Handbook. Los Alamos Scientific Laboratory Lams, 2162.
- Graves, E. R. (1963). Howard Eberline Neutron Survey Instrument PNC-1 Evaluation and Recommendation for Use. (No. LA-2860). Los Alamos Scientific Lab., New Mexico.
- Davis, R. W., & Graves, E. R. (1969). The Radiation Instrument Calibration Facility at the Los Alamos Scientific Laboratory. (No. LA—4090). Los Alamos Scientific Lab., New Mexico.
- Davis, R., & Graves, E. (1969). The Radiation Instrument Calibration Facility at the Los Alamos Scientific Laboratory. (Construction and calibration of radiation survey instruments).
