= James H. Coon =

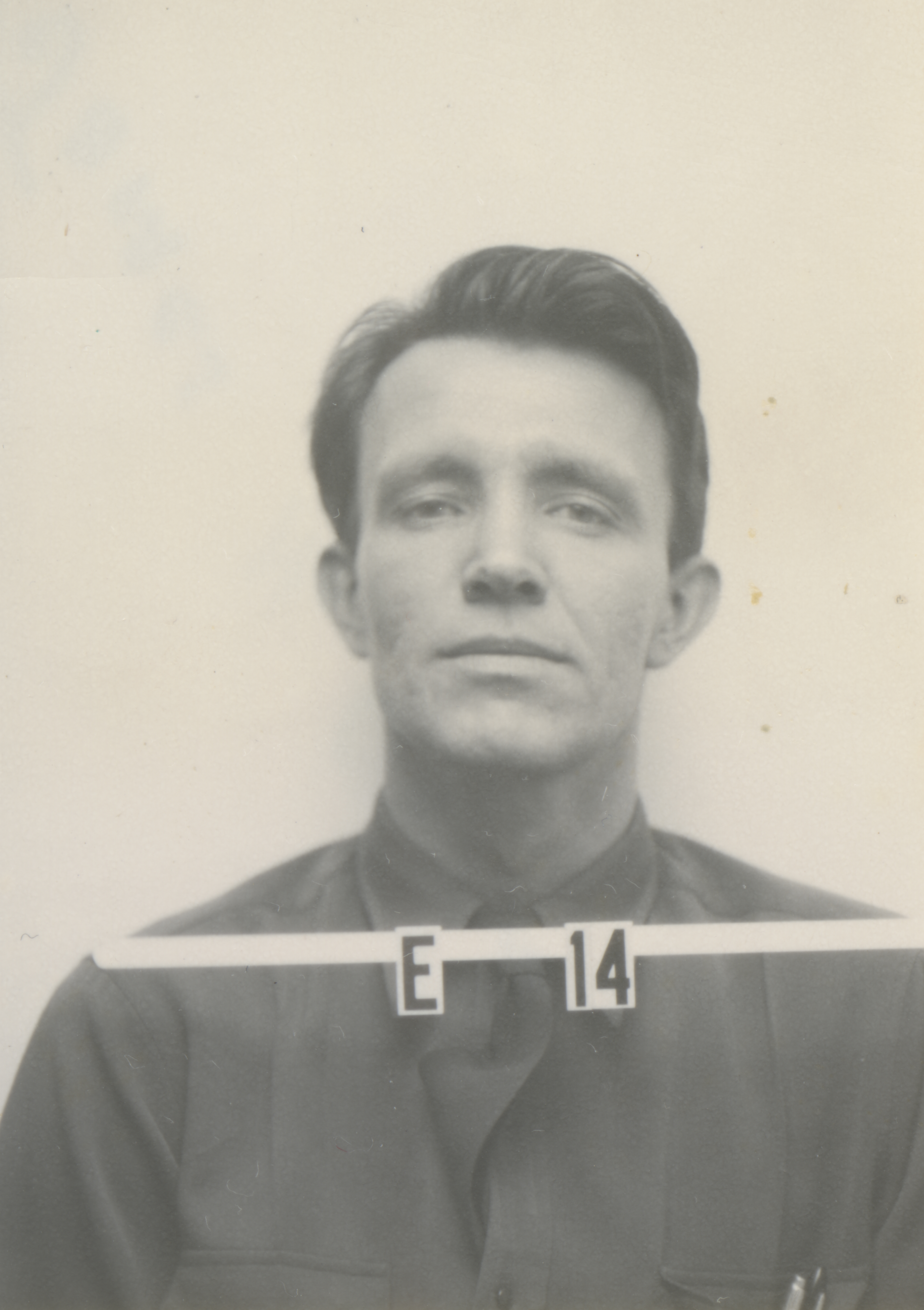
- Coon's Los Alamos Scientific Laboratory badge
- Born: James Huntington Coon; November 9, 1914
- Died: March 10, 1996 (aged 81)
- Education: Indiana University Bloomington (BA); University of Chicago (PhD)
- Occupation: Physicist

James Huntington Coon (November 9, 1914 – March 10, 1996) physicist at Los Alamos Scientific Laboratory, made significant contributions to the science and study of neutron interactions. He worked on the Vera satellite project.

== Life and Times ==
James Huntington Coon was born on November 9, 1914, and died on March 10, 1996. He was interred at the Guaje Pines Cemetery, burial plot of Section 5, Lot 146C in Los Alamos, New Mexico.

== Education ==
Coon attended Indiana University at Bloomington, Indiana, and graduated in 1937 with a Bachelor of Arts in chemistry. Outside of studies, he had membership in the Chemistry Dolphin Club, Der Deutsche Verein (The German Club) and the Varsity Swimming team.

In 1942, Coon received a Ph.D. in physics from the University of Chicago.

== Los Alamos ==
In 1944, scientists at Los Alamos Scientific Laboratory designed field experiments to measure the air blast and ground shock effects from the Trinity device. In March 1945, an exploration geophysicist Herbert M. Houghton, from Geophysical Research Corporation (GRC) and Tidewater Oil, was hired to work with Coon. The team of Coon and Houghton was tasked to make ready the earth shock instrumentation for the 7 May 1945 calibration rehearsal shot of a 100-ton TNT device and the Trinity test in July 1945.

In March 1954, Coon resided in New Mexico according to the 1954 National Register of Scientific and Technical Personnel.

In 1954, Coon was P-4 group leader along with P-6 group leader Elizabeth Riddle Graves at Los Alamos. The Coon and Graves groups utilized a 250 kV Cockcroft–Walton generator to accelerate Deuterons to bombard Tritium (H-3) inside a Zirconium target with Tritium to produce 14 MeV neutrons. The scientists at Los Alamos were interested in how neutrons interacted with assorted thermonuclear fuels, tamper materials, and fissile materials. The 14 MeV neutrons were used to perform studies that included: elastic and inelastic scattering; interaction cross sections for the (n, 2n) reactions; interaction cross sections for Lithium and the production of undesirable particles; interaction cross sections of elements; bombardment of several substances and the resultant gamma radiation yield; neutron production and yield from fission; and neutron multiplication factors. Coon's group, Group P-4, used a graphite pile to calibrate neutron sources. A new 600 kV Cockcroft–Walton generator was under construction.

== Vela Satellite ==
In 1967, Coon was a project scientist on the Vela HOTEL satellite project at Los Alamos Scientific Laboratory.

== NRC-NAS Physics Survey ==
In 1972, Coon served on the Physic Survey Committee in the Impact on National Security subpanel for the NRC-NAS Physics Survey.

== Swimming ==
In 1978, Coon at the age of 63, achieved top results in the Men's 60–64 SCY (Short Course Yards) in the 500 Freestyle and 1650 Freestyle events according to U.S. Masters Swimming records.

== James H. Coon Sciences Prize ==
At Indiana University, the James H. Coon Sciences Prize was established by Coon and $1,500 is awarded annually to a "student who shows promise in one of the sciences".

== Publications ==
- Capture Cross Section of Si for Thermal Neutrons, 1942. Coon.
- Angular distribution of 2.5 MeV neutrons scattered by deuterium. Coon & Henry H. Barschall
- Elastic Backscattering of (d, d) Neutrons. Manley, J. H., Harold M. Agnew, H. H. Barschall, W. C. Bright, J. H. Coon, Elizabeth Riddle Graves, T. Jorgensen, and Bernard Waldman.
- Angular distribution of (n, d) scattering for 2.5-Mev neutrons. Coon.
- Disintegrations of Neon and Argon by (d, d) Neutrons. Graves, Elizabeth R., & Coon.
- Cross Section of D (d, n) He-3 Reaction. Coon & Graves.
- Hydrogen Recoil Proportional Counter for Neutron Detection.
- The Reaction He-3 (n, p) H-3 Induced by Thermal Neutrons.
- He-3 Isotopic Abundance Measurement by Counter Technique.
- He-3 Isotopic Abundance.
- Disintegration of He-3 and N-14 by Thermal Neutrons.
- Interaction of 14 MeV Neutrons with Deuterons.
- Angular Distribution of 14 MeV Neutrons Scattered by Tritons. Coon, Bockelman, C. K.,& Barschall, H. H.
- Disintegration of He-3 by Fast Neutrons.
- Neutron-Proton Scattering at 27 MeV.
- Angular Distribution of 14 MeV Neutrons Scattered by Tritons.
- Neutron-Proton Scattering at 27 MeV.
- Total Cross Sections of Tritium, Hydrogen, and Helium for Fast Neutrons.
- Total Cross Sections for 14 MeV Neutrons.
- Elastic Scattering of 14 MeV Neutrons.
- Scattering of 14.5 MeV Neutrons by Complex Nuclei.
- Some Recent Results on Fast Neutron Cross Sections.
- Total neutron cross sections of the hydrogen and helium isotopes.
- Fast neutron physics.
- Targets for the Production of Neutrons.
- Vela Satellite Measurements.
- Vela satellite measurements of particles in the solar wind and the distant geomagnetosphere.
- Radiation Trapped in the Earth's Magnetic Field.
- Earth's Particles and Fields.
- Solar Wind Observations.
