= Strontium unit =

Unit for radioactivity exposure

The strontium unit is a unit used to measure the amount of radioactivity from strontium-90, a radionuclide found in nuclear fallout, in a subject's body. Since the human body absorbs strontium as if it were calcium, incorporating it into the skeleton, its presence is very common. One strontium unit is equal to one picocurie from strontium-90 per gram of calcium (37 becquerels per kilogram) in the subject's skeleton.

The United States National Academy of Sciences holds that the maximum safe measure of strontium-90 in a person is one hundred strontium units (3700 Bq/kg). The average American is estimated to have three to four strontium units.

The strontium unit was formerly known briefly as the sunshine unit, the name was derived from a recognizable source of background radiation (the Sun), and used as a convenient measure. Ten sunshine units are comparable to natural background radiation. One thousand sunshine units were not expected to produce any visible skeletal damage, but ten thousand units might be hazardous.

== See also ==
- Project GABRIEL
- Project SUNSHINE
- Banana equivalent dose
