= Ivory Ella =

Online for-profit clothing store

- Founded: April 18, 2015
- Founders: Ryan Duranso, Jacob Castaldi, Richard Henne, Jesse Jones, John Allen and Esma Ilyas
- Purpose: Wildlife conservation
- Method: Clothing sales
- Website: ivoryella.com

Ivory Ella is an online for-profit clothing store owned by CEO John Allen and five other co-founders, an organization specializing in wildlife conservation of elephants. Ivory Ella sells clothing and accessories, donating a portion of the proceeds to nonprofit organizations including Save the Elephants. Named after Ella, an elephant in Amboseli National Park, the company donates to end ivory trade and preserve elephant ivory.

== Company history ==
CEO John Allen and co-founder Jacob Casaldi first founded Ivory Ella in Connecticut. Allen noticed that the elephant ring from his former workplace Boho Outfitters sold better than anything else, so they opened their new brand because of how much the media was talking about elephants. The company was launched in 2015. Ivory Ella has been hesitant but is willing to join the market in Amazon, in case another situation like COVID-19 happens. They are concerned that another pandemic might affect their sales again.

== Donations ==
Ivory Ella focuses on donations to the organization Save the Elephants. They dedicate 10% of net profit to end the ivory trade and to keep elephants safe.

=== Australian wildlife ===
The company released their Australian Wildlife Rescue collection in 2020. The clothing collection sent 100% of its net profit to the Animals Australia organization.

=== COVID-19 ===
The proceeds from their Spread Hope campaign go to Project Sunshine, which makes activity kits for children's hospitals. The kits are used as a therapeutic and engagement tool for isolated patients.

=== Childhood cancer ===
With the help of Megan Bugg, Ivory Ella sent the proceeds from their collection, co-designed with Bugg, to Lurie's Children's Hospital Chicago. These proceeds helped with research and supplies.

== Sustainability ==
Ivory Ella's shirts are made from 100% cotton. The company also sells other clothing, jewelry, and accessories that are not sustainable for the environment.
