= Bruxner =

Bruxner is a surname. Notable people with the surname include:

- Michael Bruxner (1882–1970), Australian politician and soldier
- Tim Bruxner (born 1923), Australian politician

== Locations ==
- Bruxner Highway, state highway in New South Wales, Australia

== See also ==
- Berlyn Brixner (1911–2009), photographer
