= Sally Fox (photographer) =

American photographer, art collector, editor

- Sally Fox, from the Jewish Women's Archive
- Born: Salomea Cherniavsky; December 30, 1929; Hollywood, California
- Died: February 25, 2006 (aged 75); Cambridge, Massachusetts, US
- Occupation(s): Photographer, textbook editor, collector of historical illustrations and photographs

Sally Fox (née Cherniavsky; December 30, 1929 – February 25, 2006) was an American photographer, art collector and editor. She worked as a photographer, coordinator and picture editor for Houghton Mifflin and was especially known for her curated collections of historical images of women's lives which she published during the 1980s.

== Biography ==
=== Early life ===
Cherniavsky was born in 1929 in Hollywood, California, United States. Her parents were Joseph Cherniavsky and Lara (née Lieberman), Jewish musicians who had emigrated to the United States from the Soviet Union during the Russian Civil War. Her family soon moved back to New York City, where they had lived previously; their stay in Hollywood was relatively short. She grew up in New York and attended the High School of Music & Art and then graduated with a bachelor's degree in painting and art history from Queens College in 1950.

=== Career ===
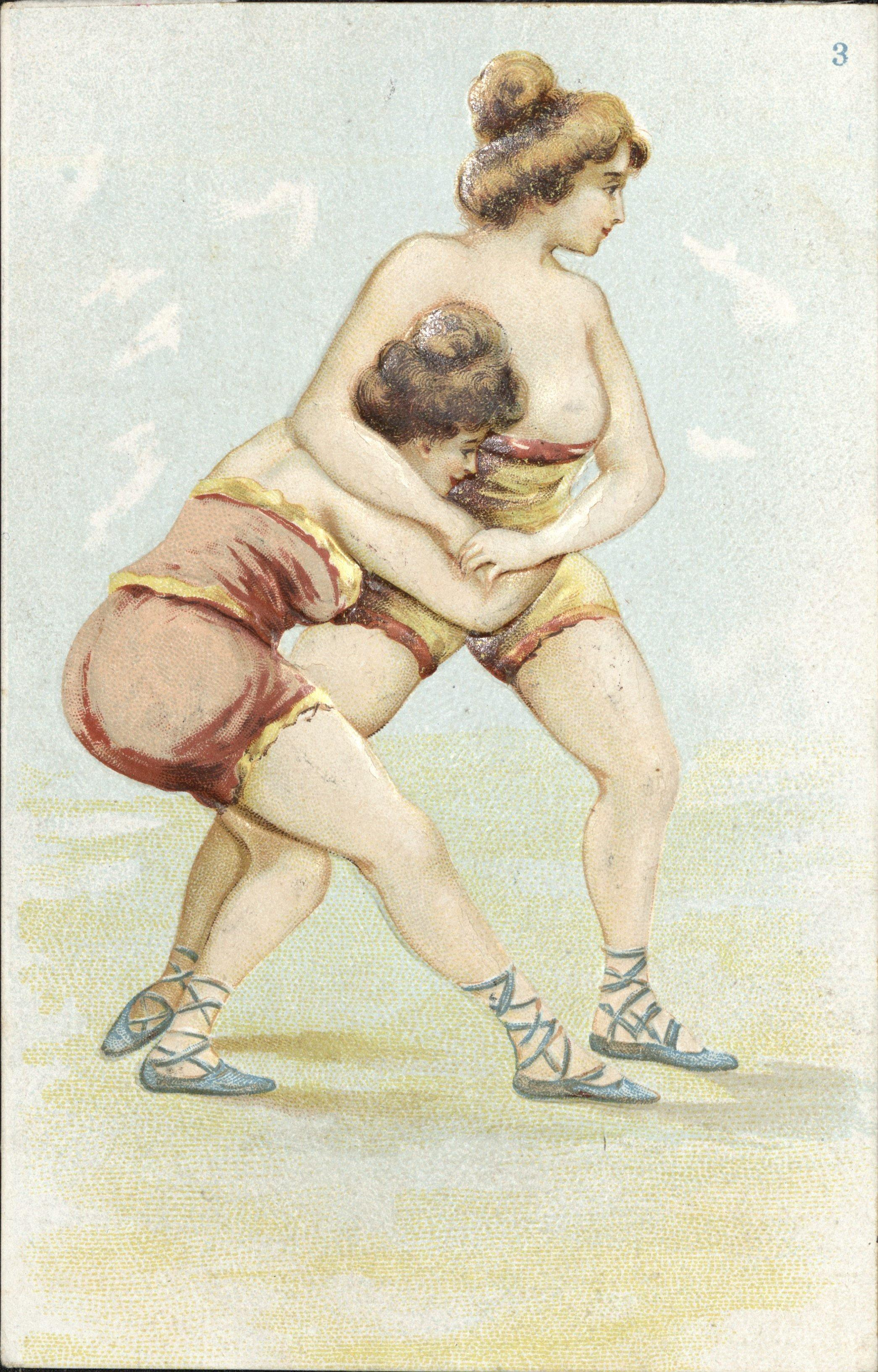
An illustration from the Sally Fox collection at the Schlesinger Library

After her graduation she started working as an assistant to the librarian and publicity director of the Museum of Modern Art. She then worked at the Archives of American Art. She married biologist Maurice Sanford Fox in Manhattan in 1955. They left New York for Massachusetts in 1962 where Maurice took up a teaching position at the Massachusetts Institute of Technology. In the early 1970s she started working as a freelance photographer for Houghton Mifflin. She was eventually promoted to coordinator of picture research and picture editor at the company.

In 1981 while planning a months-long trip to Paris, where Maurice would be teaching for a semester, a friend showed her a postcard from the Bibliothèque nationale de France which reproduced a historical depiction of a woman sculptor in the process of carving a statue. She became fascinated, and while in Europe she attempted to find more historical depictions of women in the collection of the Bibliothèque nationale, the British Library, and other collections. Upon her return to the United States she continued her search in American collections and in other countries. She was especially interested in illustrations of women at leisure and at work, eventually amassing a collection of thousands. She believed that such historical images of women could give a more accurate portrayal of the lives of women in other eras than written history which excluded them or portrayed their lives in a distorted manner. By 1984 she stepped away from her role at Houghton-Mifflin as picture editor and focused more fully on her historical images project. By 1985 she had collected enough images that she was able to publish them in several collected volumes. The first was The Medieval Woman. An Illuminated Book of Days (1985), which eventually sold more than 300,000 copies. Her next book was The Victorian Woman. A Book of Days (1987), followed by Medieval Women. An Illuminated Address Book (1988) and The Sporting Woman. A Book of Days (1989).

In the 1990s, with the support of the Sports Museum of New England, some of her collection was turned into a touring exhibit titled The Sporting Woman: InSights from the Past. It was displayed at various museums and universities in the United States. In 2005 she donated most of her collections of images to the Schlesinger Library at Harvard University.

== Death ==
Fox died in 2006 in Cambridge, Massachusetts.

== Publications ==
- The Medieval Woman. An Illuminated Book of Days (Little Brown & Company, 1985)
- The Victorian Woman. A Book of Days (Little Brown & Company, 1987)
- Medieval Women. An Illuminated Address Book (Little Brown & Company/New York Graphic Society, 1988)
- The Sporting Woman. A Book of Days (Little Brown & Company, 1989)
