= Maurice Sanford Fox =

American geneticist

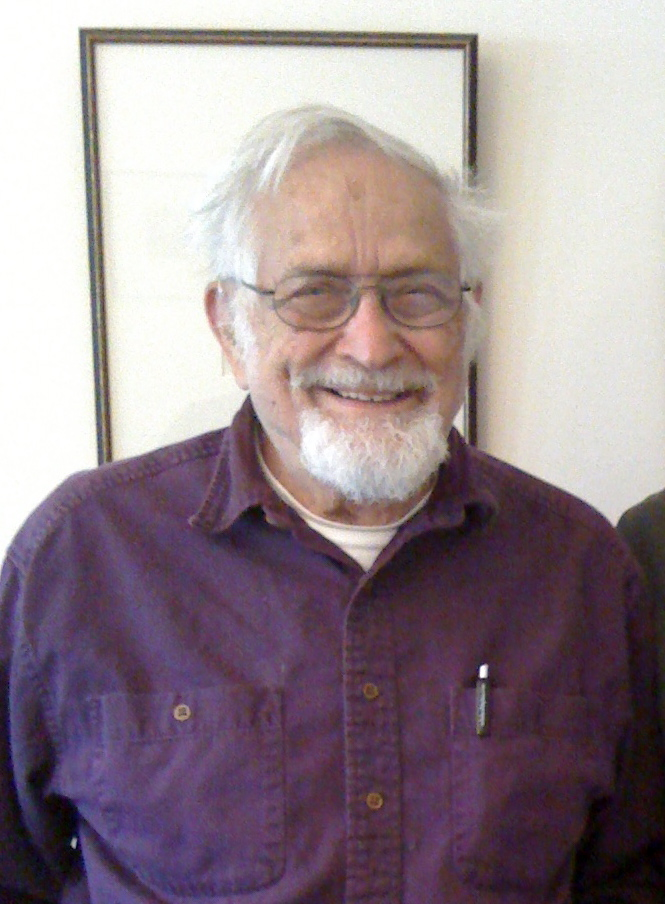
- Born: Maurice Sanford Fox; October 11, 1924; New York City, New York, U.S.
- Died: January 26, 2020 (aged 95)
- Education: University of Chicago
- Known for: Molecular Biology, Genetic Mutation
- Awards: Docteur Honoris Causa, Paul Sabatier University, Toulouse, France (1994)
- Scientific career
- Fields: Molecular Biology
- Workplaces: Rockefeller Institute for Medical Research; Massachusetts Institute of Technology
- Doctoral advisor: Willard Libby
- Doctoral students: David Botstein
- Other notable students: H. Robert Horvitz

Maurice Sanford Fox (October 11, 1924 – January 26, 2020) was an American geneticist and molecular biologist, and professor of biology at the Massachusetts Institute of Technology (MIT), where he served as department chair between 1985 and 1989. His pioneering investigations of bacterial transformation helped illuminate the mechanisms by which donor DNA enters and is integrated into a host cell. His research also contributed to our understanding of mechanisms of DNA mutation, recombination, and mismatch repair more generally. Ancillary activities include his critical role in the establishment of the Council for a Livable World. He was married to photo researcher Sally Fox, who died in 2006, for over 50 years, and has three sons (Jonathan, Gregory, and Michael). Fox died in January 2020 at the age of 95.

== Youth and education ==
Maurice Fox (Maury) was born of poor Russian Jewish immigrants and spent his formative years living in New York City. He is the brother of Evelyn Fox Keller and, early on, encouraged her work in science. Like many others of his generation, he benefited from an excellent public school system in which a budding interest in science was fostered from an early age. His study of chemistry began at Stuyvesant High School and, after a brief stint at Queens College where he took calculus from Banesh Hoffmann, and another as weather forecaster in the U.S. Army Air Force during WWII, culminated in a Ph.D. under Willard Libby at the University of Chicago in 1951. It was at Chicago that he first met, and soon became a disciple, protégé, friend and colleague of, Leó Szilárd. Szilárd's biography contains many references to Fox. Szilárd recruited him into the small but growing ranks of the new discipline of molecular biology. In 1953, he moved to the Rockefeller Institute for Medical Research to work in Roland Hotchkiss' group.

It was a heady time, in which bright young people, coming from a range of scientific disciplines, were challenged to pose questions about biology on which their diverse skills might be brought to bear. This period has often been referred to as the "Golden Age of Molecular Biology," but its particular ethos shaped Fox's research for the next half century, as he continued to pose novel kinds of, and novel approaches to, questions about molecular genetics, about cancer, about adaptive mutation; to insist on the pursuit of unexamined possibilities; and to free and open sharing of ideas with colleagues and students. His life was also marked by an ongoing commitment (shared with Szilárd) to nurturing the young, and to fulfilling his particular social and political responsibilities as a scientist.

== Key scientific contributions ==
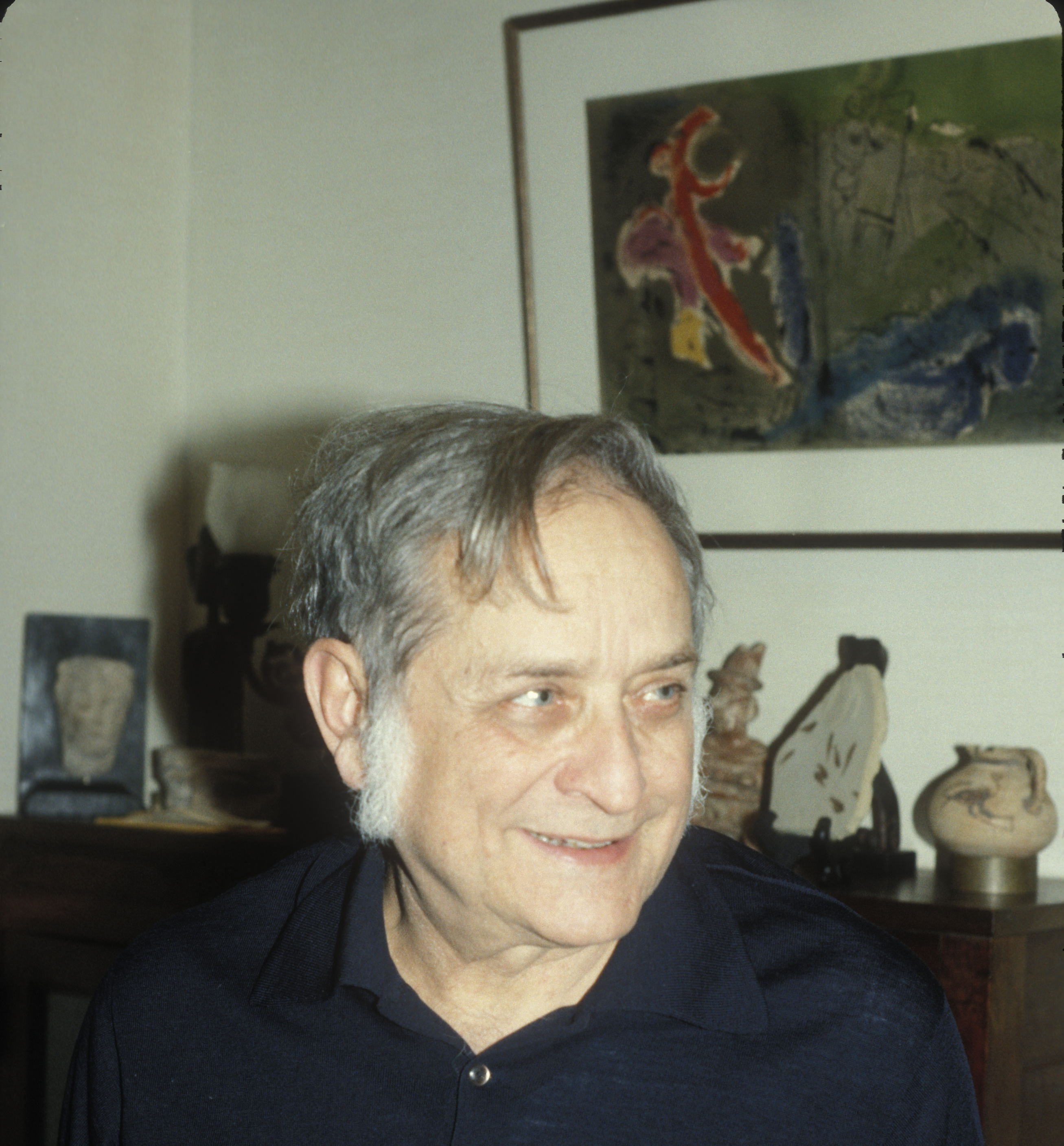
Maury Fox in his home in 1988

Fox's primary achievement in the early part of his career was to turn bacterial transformation into an experimental model for genetic analysis that was to provide key insights into the mechanisms of genetic modification. Later he was able to extend the modes of analysis developed in this early work to the investigation of genetic modification in transduction and conjugation as well. In addition to this work to enhance our understanding of mutation, recombination, and mismatch repair, he was also known for his lifelong insistence on the critical interrogation of available data, on the posing of alternative possible explanations, and on the design of experiments that could test such alternative interpretations. These habits of inquiry were remarkably productive, both in his own work and in the work of the many others with whom he interacted. Directly or indirectly, it led, e.g., to the search for RNA viruses by Tim Loeb (1961), to the discovery of the SOS response in bacteria by Miroslav Radman (1976), and to the development of techniques of bacterial cell fusion by Pierre Shaeffer (1976). It also led him to a very early challenge (based on critical examination of the epidemiological data on breast cancer) to the prevailing confidence among physicians in the efficacy either of radical mastectomy or of mammograms (1979), and to an equally early recognition of the critical importance of epigenetic changes in the initial stages of carcinogenesis (1980).

== Social and political issues ==
From the start of his career, Fox was attentive to the social and political implications of scientific actively. He was, e.g., concerned about the biological effects of radiation, the dangers of biological warfare, the risks of gene therapy and (later) of genetic recombination, and on all these issues, he was actively involved in efforts to reduce risks and guarantee public safety. He talked to citizen groups, rallied scientists, wrote editorials and letters for Science, and participated in committees. For example, he chaired the Radiation Protection Committee at MIT in the 1960s, and was a member of the International Bioethics Committee of UNESCO from 1998. But what may have been his most important political and social contribution was his role in helping Szilárd organize the "Council for a Livable World" (originally called "Council for Abolishing War", 1962) and facilitating its operation. This organization served as an early political action committee and was effective in supporting peace candidates for legislative positions throughout the 1960s and 1970s.

== Selected honors ==
- 1959. Lalor Award.
- 1963. Fellow, American Association for the Advancement of Science
- 1980. Member, Institute of Medicine
- 1988. Member, United States National Academy of Sciences
- 1991. NIH Fogarty International Center Fellowship
- 1992. Fellow, American Academy of Microbiology
- 1995. Fellow, American Academy of Arts and Sciences
- 1994. Docteur Honoris Causa, Paul Sabatier University, Toulouse, France
- 1998. Member, International Bioethics Committee of UNESCO

== Selected publications ==
- ———————— (1957). "Deoxyribonucleic acid incorporation by transformed bacteria". Biochimica et Biophysica Acta. 26 (1): 83–85. doi:10.1016/0006-3002(57)90056-2. PMID 13479463.
- ————————; Marcia K. Allen (1964). "On the mechanism of deoxyribonucleate integration in pneumococcal transformation". Proceedings of the National Academy of Sciences. 52 (2): 412–419. Bibcode:1964PNAS...52..412F. doi:10.1073/pnas.52.2.412. JSTOR 72455. PMC 300292. PMID 14206608.
- ———————— (1978). "Some features of genetic recombination in procaryotes". Annual Review of Genetics. 12: 47–68. doi:10.1146/annurev.ge.12.120178.000403. PMID 371531.
- ———————— (1979). "On the diagnosis and treatment of breast cancer". JAMA. 241 (5): 489–494. doi:10.1001/jama.1979.03290310029009. PMID 759664.
- Kunes, Sam; David Botstein; Maurice S. Fox (1985). "Transformation of yeast with linearized plasmid DNA: Formation of inverted dimers and recombinant plasmid products". Journal of Molecular Biology. 184 (3): 375–387. doi:10.1016/0022-2836(85)90288-8. PMID 3900413.
- Radicella, J. Pablo; Elizabeth A. Clark; Maurice S. Fox (1988). "Some mismatch repair activities in Escherichia coli". Proceedings of the National Academy of Sciences. 85 (24): 9674–9678. Bibcode:1988PNAS...85.9674R. doi:10.1073/pnas.85.24.9674. JSTOR 32699. PMC 282834. PMID 2974159.
- Radicella, J. Pablo; Peter U. Park; Maurice S. Fox (1995). "Adaptive mutation in Escherichia coli: A Role for Conjugation". Science. 268 (5209): 418–420. Bibcode:1995Sci...268..418R. doi:10.1126/science.7716545. PMID 7716545.
- ————————; Sidney Klawansky (2006). "Interruption of cell transformation and cancer formation". The FASEB Journal. 20 (13): 2209–2213. doi:10.1096/fj.06-6455hyp. PMID 17077297. S2CID 45783058.
