= Nicholas M. Smith Jr. =

American nuclear physicist (1941–2003)

Nicholas Monroe Smith Jr. (1914 – 2003) was a nuclear physicist and research consultant. Smith was an expert on reactor physics, a developer of operations research/computer modeling, and a computer applications consultant. He had ties to the Manhattan Project at Chicago and Oak Ridge, and worked with Samuel Allison and James Van Allen. Smith was a pioneer in the field of operations research.

== Early life and education ==
Smith was born on March 23, 1914, in Little Rock, Arkansas, the son of Nick Monroe Smith and Mary Gossett. He attended the University of Arkansas and received his Bachelor of Arts degree in mathematics and physics. According to the US Census, in 1940 Smith and his wife Elizabeth resided in Chicago, Illinois. At the University of Chicago, he earned a master's and doctoral degrees in physics. He worked in the Ryerson Physical Laboratory, At University of Chicago, his advisor was Samuel Allison and graduate studies involved work on Chicago Pile-1, the first controlled nuclear chain reaction by Enrico Fermi. Smith landed a postdoctoral fellowship at the Carnegie Institution of Washington, Washington, D.C., and performed research with James Van Allen in the Department of Terrestrial Magnetism. In addition to Allison, Smith worked with physicist Lester Skaggs to design an aircraft proximity detection system that utilized radio waves to locate and detonate anti-aircraft shells.

== Career as a physicist ==
Following the outbreak of World War II, Smith obtained a position at the Johns Hopkins Applied Physics Laboratory Maryland. As a civilian scientist, he was assigned to the Army Air Force in England, and planned railway targets for airstrikes in support of D-Day. For this work he was presented with the Medal of Freedom.

After World War II, Smith worked as a physicist at Oak Ridge National Laboratory in Tennessee from 1946 to 1951. He studied and reported on the dangers of radioactive material contamination from nuclear weapons.

In 1949, Smith at Oak Ridge conducted a study sponsored by the Atomic Energy Commission (A.E.C.)'s Division of Biology and Medicine, and performed calculations to determine the theoretical number of atomic bomb detonations necessary to achieve significant radiation exposure and radioactive material fallout. In 1951 after the Ranger and Greenhouse tests, Smith reassessed the earlier calculations and estimates. He determined that detonation of 100,000 Nagasaki type bombs would be sufficient to achieve the doomsday effect. With this information, the A.E.C.'s staff of the Division of Biology and Medicine concluded this to be extremely remote and dubbed the study as Project GABRIEL.

== Project GABRIEL ==
In the AEC, the group responsible for Project GABRIEL was the Division of Biology and Medicine. The Division was charged with maintenance of experimental studies and field studies. The Division was required to collect and analyze data from internal and external sources. In 1949, Smith performed a theoretical analysis of the long term aspects of Project GABRIEL. He reached the conclusion that:

Sr-90 is by far the most hazardous isotope resulting from nuclear detonations, and that the distribution of this isotope over large areas of the earth's surface constitutes the limiting factor in estimating the long-range hazard from the use of a large number of atomic bombs.

In 1952, the RAND Corporation completed a study of Project GABRIEL, and was charged with analyzing the short term characteristics of nuclear fallout. The study was dubbed Project AUREOLE.

== Operations research ==
For 20 years, Smith worked at Research Analysis Corporation as leader in the Advanced Research Department, a U.S. Army funded successor to the Operations Research Office. The focus of the work was war games simulation and nonlinear computer programming. His department produced numerous professional papers, including two Lanchester prize-winning books.

In 1971, Smith founded TELIMIS Corporation, based in Springfield, Virginia, a company that developed applications in computer technology. He went on to work as a consultant and served as chief scientist at the Washington Institute of Technology in Fairfax, Virginia.

== Death ==
Smith died on August 7, 2003, at his home in Lusby, Maryland, of metastatic prostate cancer.

== Awards and honors ==
- Medal of Freedom, for World War II work in operations research
- Phi Beta Kappa
- Sigma Xi

== Professional affiliations ==
- American Society for Cybernetics
- Society for General Systems Research
- Operations Research Society of America

=== Patents ===
- Apparatus for observing the conduct of a projectile in a gun.
- Microwave measuring of projectile speed.

== Death ==
Smith died August 7, 2003.
