= Project GABRIEL =

US government research study

Project GABRIEL was an investigation to gauge the impact of nuclear fallout resulting from nuclear warfare. The United States Atomic Energy Commission surmised that the radioactive isotope strontium-90 (Sr-90) presented the greatest hazard to life globally, which resulted in the commissioning of Project SUNSHINE: which sought to examine the levels of Sr-90 in human tissues and bones (with a special interest in infants) gathered from around the world.

== Background ==
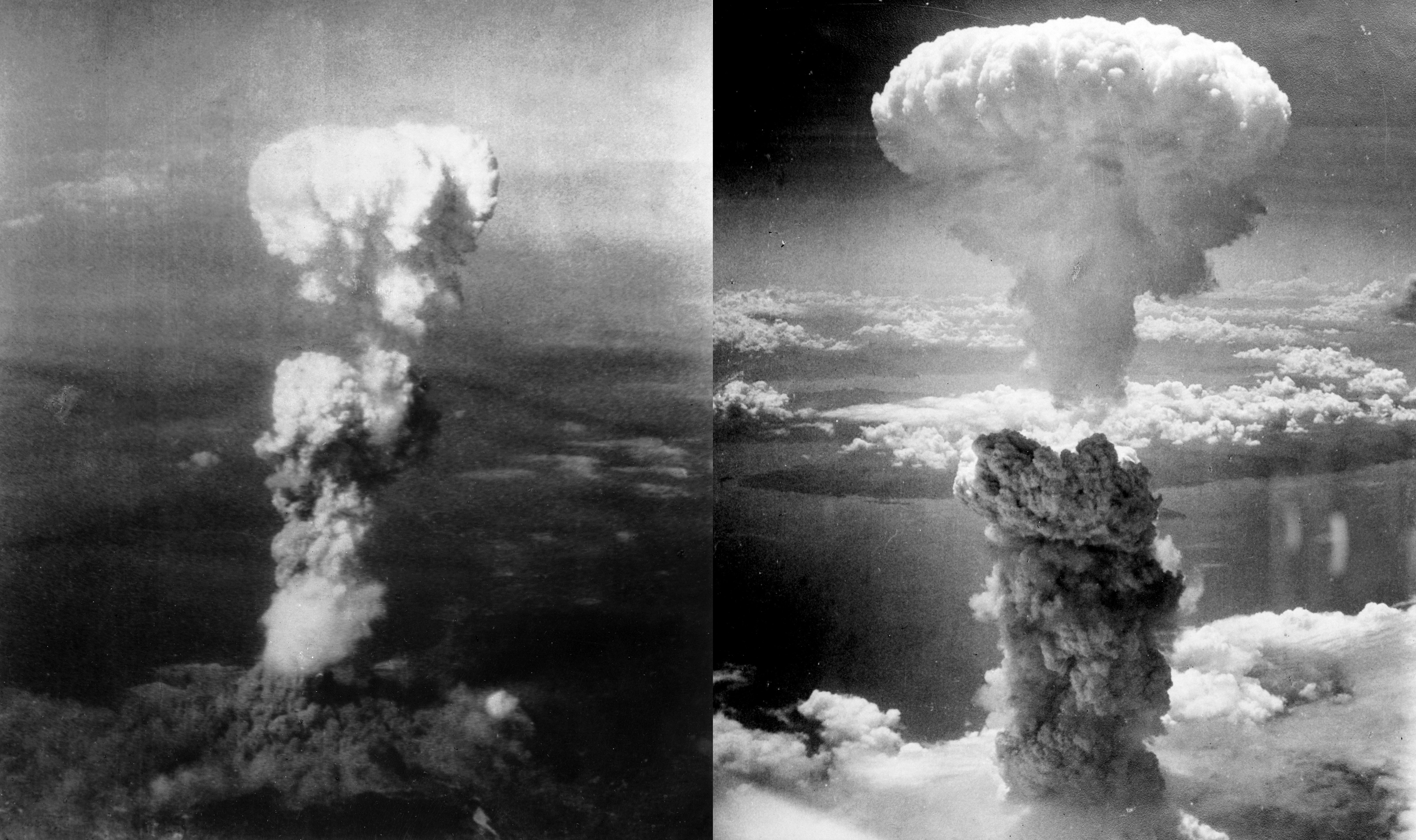
Atomic bomb mushroom clouds over Hiroshima (left) and Nagasaki (right)

During the Cold War era, there was an escalation of atmospheric testing of nuclear weapons. After the atomic bombings of Hiroshima and Nagasaki in 1945, testing continued and the scale increased with the first hydrogen bomb in 1952. Soon after the United States tested the hydrogen bomb, the Soviet Union followed, in 1953. The mushroom clouds that occurred from the explosions released radioactive isotopes in mass quantities.

The first comprehensive study of the problem of radioactive isotope release began in spring 1949 with a one-man project called GABRIEL, conducted by Nicholas M. Smith Jr. at Oak Ridge National Laboratory. Smith produced his first report in 1949.

Project GABRIEL was revived in mid-1951 because bombs that were dropped had brought up concerns people had about the dangers of strontium-90. United States Atomic Energy Commission (AEC) was interested by GABRIEL's report though they said it was lacking in hard data and needed independent confirmation of the tests.

After reviewing Project GABRIEL in 1953, it was given first priority status. The secret project would define "practical limits" for using atomic weapons. A task team was assembled and the codename used was "Project HORN." In 1954, AEC argued that fallout was harmless because there was not enough evidence to prove that fallout would harm humans, animals, or crops. The AEC campaign persuaded the public that the worldwide fallout was harmless. This claim was later disputed when scientists announced publicly that there was no safe level of radiation. This was confirmed in a confidential report by a geneticist for the AEC. By 1954 and the Castle Bravo incident, it was obvious that radioactive fallout was dangerous to humans. The United States Atomic Energy Commission Division of Biology and Medicine dealt with efforts directed towards experimental and field studies and the correlation of data dealing with Project GABRIEL. The RAND Corporation, Laboratories at Columbia University, AEC's New York office, the University of Chicago, an exclusive group of scientists, UCLA, and the United States Air Force were all involved in collection and testing of samples from around the world for radioactive fallout.

== Testing strontium-90 ==
After the hazards of strontium-90 became evident, the next step was to focus on impact and damage per detonation. Smith's tests focused primarily on how many atomic weapons could potentially be detonated before radioactive contamination of air, water and soil became a long-term effect on crops, animals and humans worldwide. In 1949, Smith estimated that it would take 3,000 Hiroshima-sized detonations in a single growing season to see if it have an effect on people who ate crops in affected areas. In 1951, Smith repeated this study with new information from the previous two detonations. With the new information, he then calculated that 10,000 Hiroshima-sized detonations would be needed before the long-term hazards became serious. The testing was done with bones, urine and tissue samples collected worldwide. These samples were all tested for nuclear fallout, yet were falsely studied under the guise of nutritional importance and naturally occurring radon. It was determined that Sr-90 is a "bone-seeker," depositing in bones and marrow after ingestion. Civilian prisoners were considered for certain radiation testing, mainly Utah State prison inmates. One document revealed tests done on the bones of a stillborn baby showed that strontium-90 levels were 36% higher than the average 55% of other stillborn.

== Studies related to Project GABRIEL ==
Project GABRIEL opened a wide range of questions about formation, transformation, fallout and biological hazards due to bomb debris. GABRIEL supported work in research projects that might apply to the side effects of nuclear war. It was the sole support of the major research effort of Project SUNSHINE, which tested biological damage from radioactive fallout of Sr-90. By 1954 Project GABRIEL included about 70 investigations supported by the Division of Biology and Medicine. At a summer conference that was hosted by the RAND Corporation the estimate of detonations was revised and increased to 25,000 megatons worth of damage. Project Sunshine was led by radiation physicist Willard Libby on July 21, 1953. Libby realized GABRIEL lacked data in other aspects of fallout, examined carbon-14 and developed radiocarbon dating. The Project GABRIEL report by the AEC was issued in 1954, while the RAND Corporation issued their report on Project SUNSHINE in 1953. Both Project GABRIEL and SUNSHINE played a direct role in the reorganization of the AEC's Division of Biology and Medicine in 1957.
