= Jack Aeby =

American mechanical engineer and photographer (1923–2015)

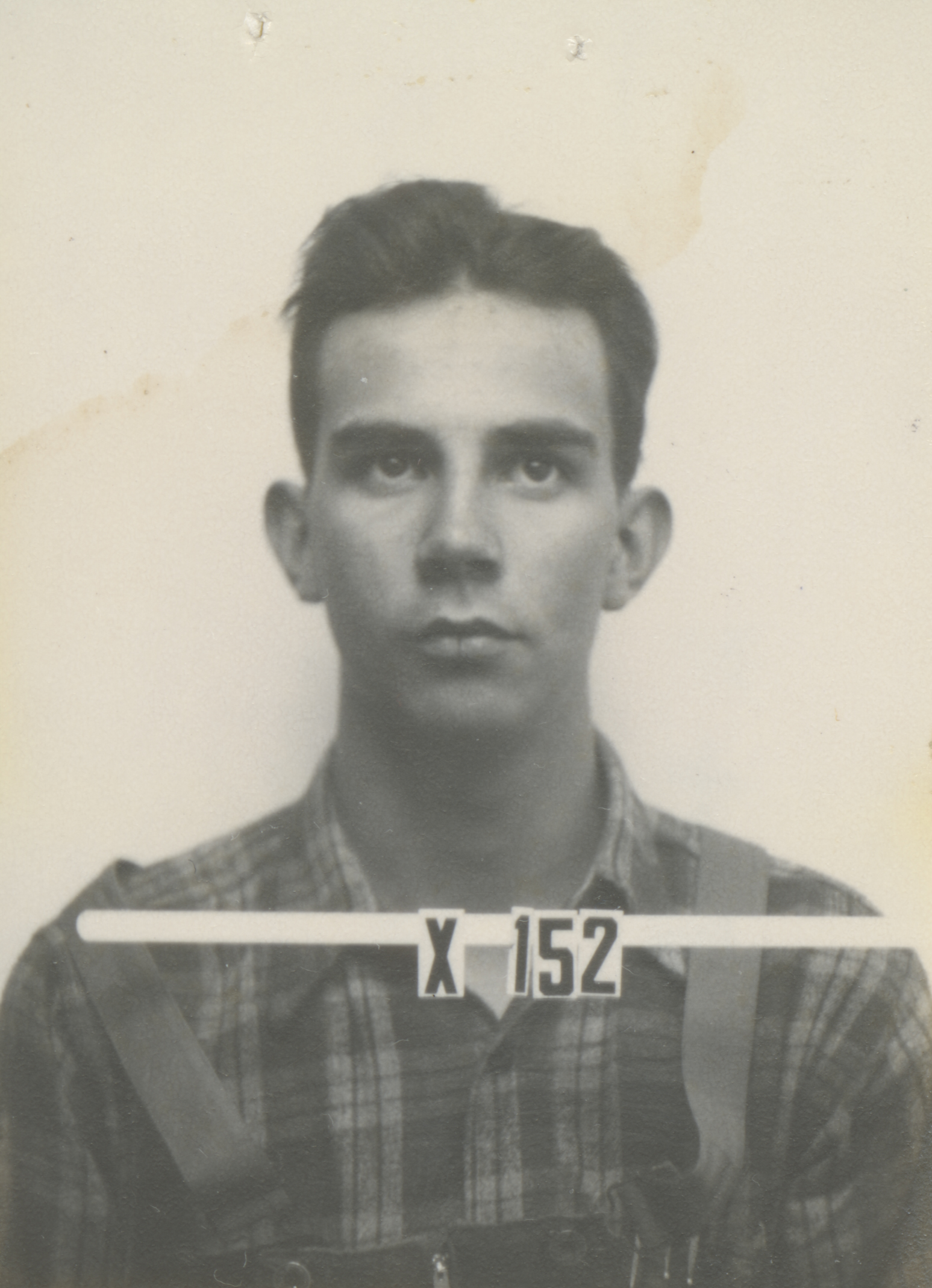
- Aeby's Los Alamos badge, c. 1940
- Born: Jack W. Aeby; August 16, 1923; Mound City, Missouri, U.S.
- Died: June 19, 2015 (aged 91); Española, New Mexico, U.S.
- Occupation: Environmental physicist
- Notable work: Trinity nuclear test color photograph

Jack W. Aeby (/ˈæbi/; August 16, 1923 – June 19, 2015) was an American environmental physicist most famous for having taken the only well-exposed color photograph of the first detonation of a nuclear weapon on July 16, 1945, at the Trinity nuclear test site in New Mexico.

== Early life ==
Jack W. Aeby was born on August 16, 1923, in Mound City, Missouri.

== Career ==
In 1942, Aeby joined the Manhattan Project by filling out an employment application in Albuquerque. He did a lot of jobs, including ferrying scientists and equipment between Albuquerque and Los Alamos. Though a civilian, he worked his way up into the SED (Special Engineering Detachment) in technician roles and eventually witnessed nearly 100 nuclear explosions. After getting his degree at the University of California, Berkeley, after the war, he returned and worked in the Health Physics Department.

On July 16, 1945, Aeby took the only well-exposed color photograph of the first detonation of a nuclear weapon at the Trinity nuclear test site in New Mexico.

While color motion pictures of the Trinity test were made, most were badly overexposed or damaged due to the fireball's tendency to blister and solarize the film. Aeby was a civilian assigned to the Physics Group 5 with Emilio Segrè and Owen Chamberlain at the time his snapshot was taken.

The photo was taken with a Perfex 33 with a 35mm lens, using a shutter speed of 1/100 at f4 and Anscochrome color movie stock film.

Aeby was not an official observer at the test site, but was invited along to take informal photos of the work, which he had commonly done since he arrived at Los Alamos. He says he took the photos of the blast on a whim, "it was there so I shot it". He took the film, a non-standard piece of Ansochrome movie stock film, out of the camera that night at a local photo lab, and worked it through the 21 step procedure for color film developing. Later on, Los Alamos management asked him if they could keep the original negative "for safe keeping". It has since been lost.

Aeby says in most uses of the photo it is reversed. This was done intentionally so that the asymmetrical fireball and cloud would look the same as other official pictures taken from the north; Aeby was on the south at the Base Camp when he took the picture.

Aeby is a source for a story about a notable estimate made by Enrico Fermi at that test:

As the shock wave hit Base Camp, Aeby saw Enrico Fermi with a handful of torn paper. "He was dribbling it in the air. When the shock wave came it moved the confetti." Fermi had just estimated the yield of the first nuclear explosion at the equivalent of 10,000 tons of TNT. Later measures put the yield nearly twice as much, at 18.6 kilotons. And this terrible new energy came from a plutonium ball weighing 13.6 pounds.

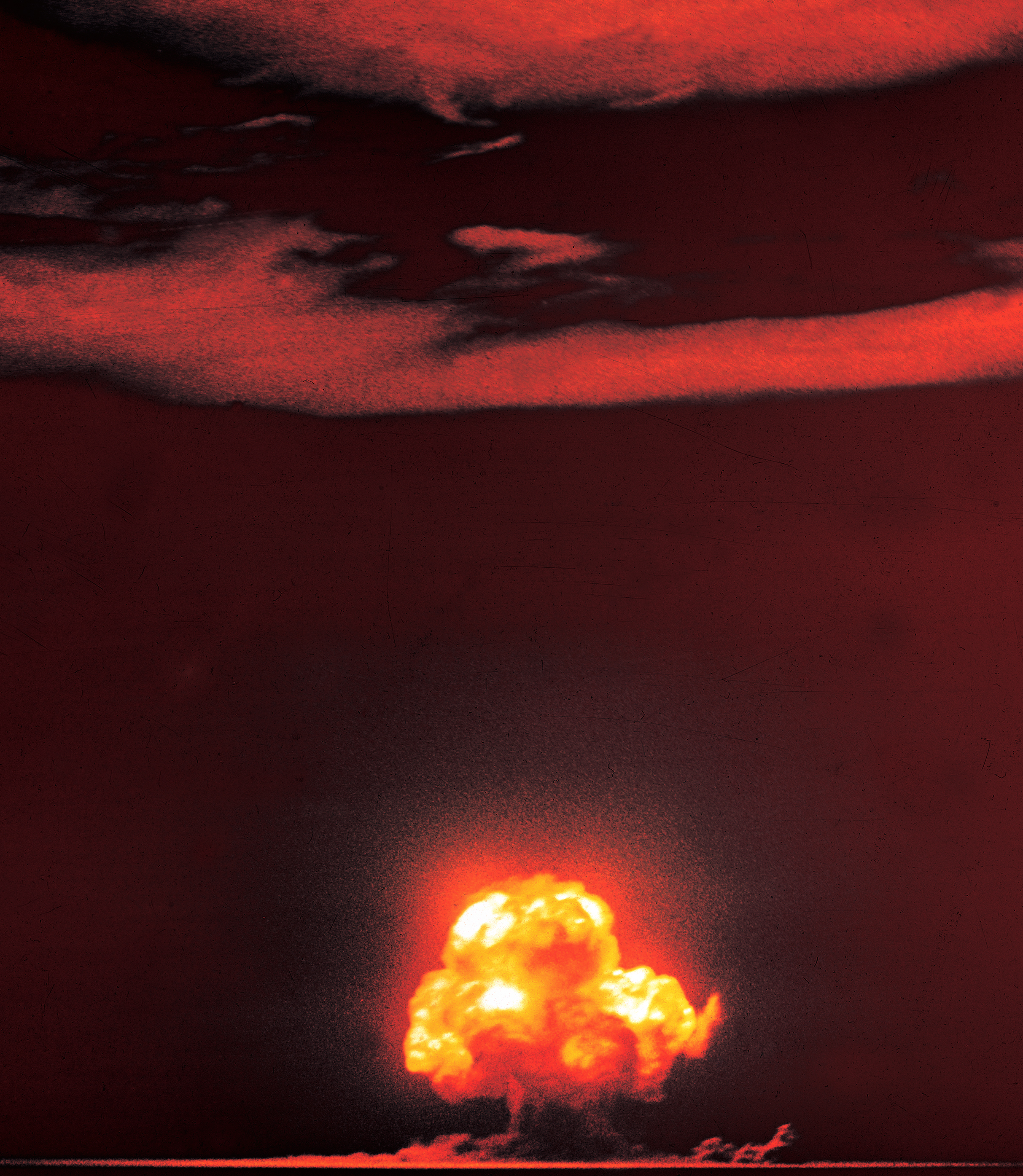
The center area of Aeby's color Anscochrome photograph of the "Trinity" explosion

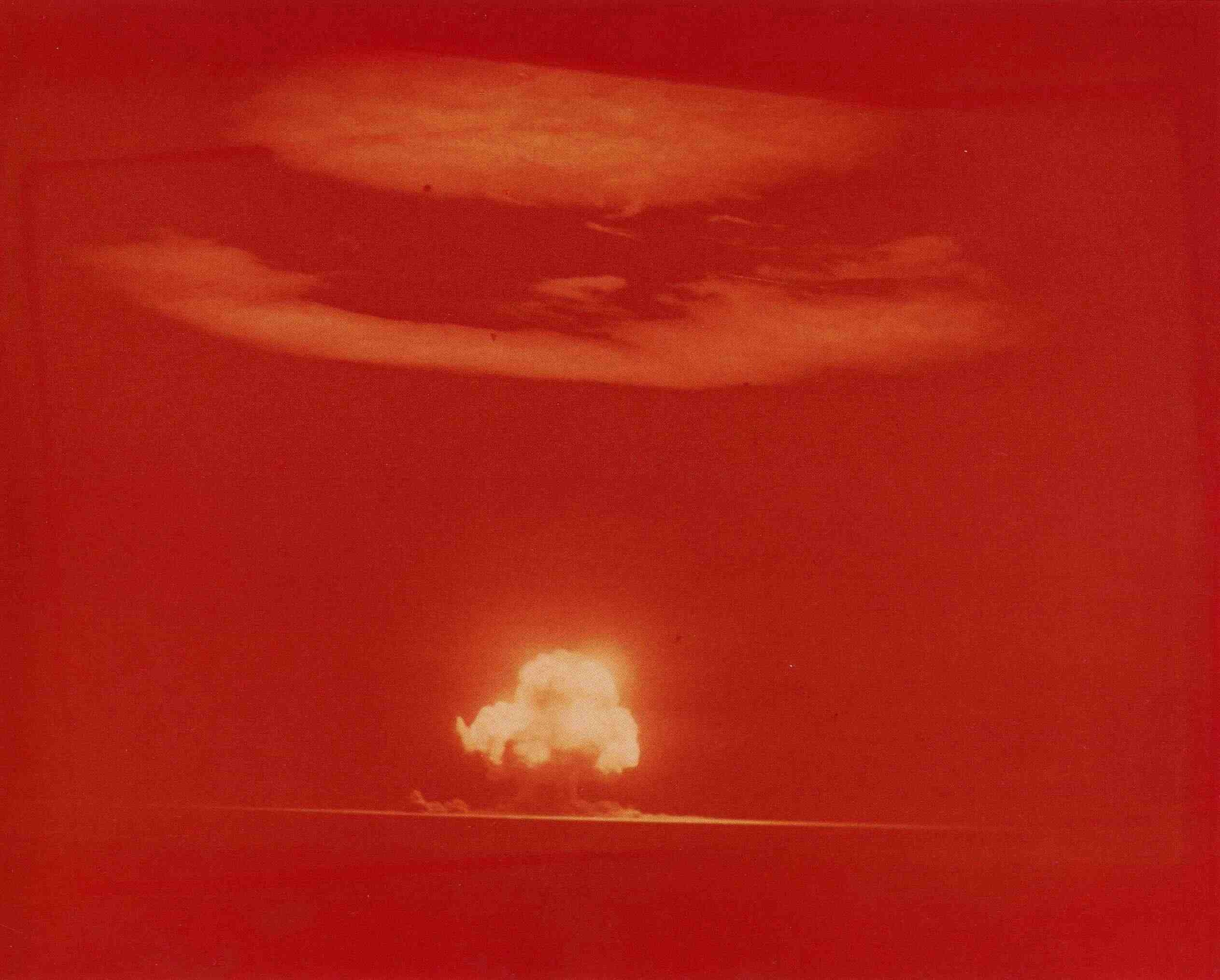
Full frame of same photo

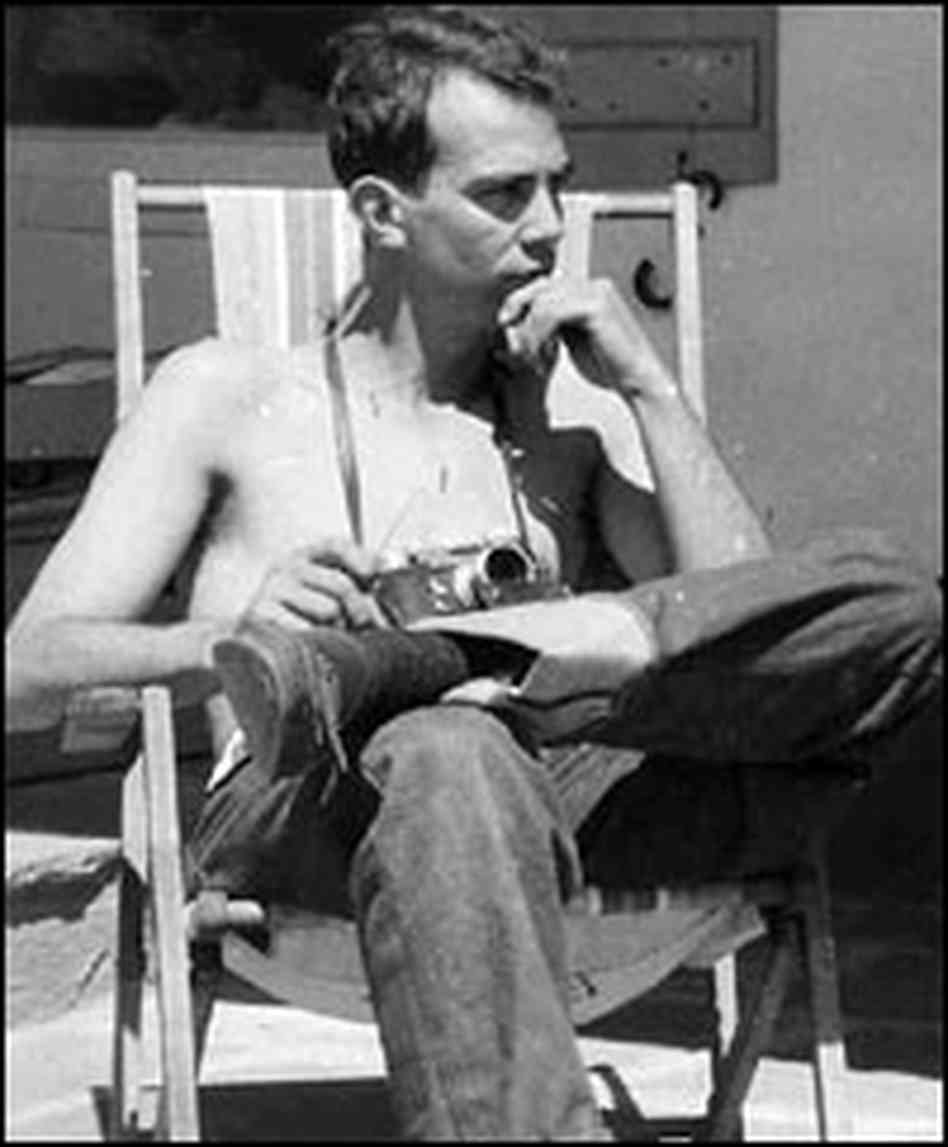
Aeby in 1944 with his Perfex 33

== Personal life ==
Aeby lived in the Española Valley in northern New Mexico with his wife Jeanne. They had 5 children. Aeby died at his home in Española in 2015.

== See also ==
- Berlyn Brixner – official Trinity test photographer
