= Howard Clayton Eberline =

Pioneer

Howard Clayton Eberline (15 October 1917 – 26 May 1981) was a pioneer in the field of instrumentation for detecting ionizing radiation, inventor and entrepreneur. Eberline started his work at Los Alamos National Laboratory and began a long career of designing and developing radiation detection instrumentation that lead to the formation of a company that would bear his name and become a key player in the industry.

== Biography ==
Eberline was born on 15 October 1917 in Soap Creek, Davis County, Iowa. His parents were Alva Rollo and Perl Alvira Hawkins Eberline from Iowa. In 1920, the family moved to Grand River, Wayne County, Iowa. In 1940, according to the U.S. Census, Eberline moved to Ward 4, Manhattan, Manhattan City, Riley, Kansas and was listed as a 'lodger'. He married Gladys Johnson on 12 April 1941. Eberline died on 26 May 1981 and was buried in Oklahoma City, Oklahoma at Memorial Park Cemetery.

== Los Alamos and Eberline Instruments ==
In 1953, Eberline left the steady employment he had at Los Alamos Scientific Laboratory and started his company Eberline Instruments, established to develop, produce and market radiation detection devices and instruments.

Eberline formed the Eberline Instrument Division in 1953 as a subsidiary of Reynolds Electrical and Engineering Company (REECO). He had been with the Los Alamos Scientific Laboratory as a group leader in the Chemistry and Metallurgy Research (CMR) Division where he developed the alpha radiation "poppy" detector. The Eberline Instrument Company was established in 1958. In 1979, Eberline Instrument Company was bought by Thermo Electron Corporation that became Thermo Fisher Scientific.

The Eberline Instrument Company was the first company to have their laboratory certified under the Health Physics Society Laboratory Accreditation Program.

== Legacy ==
- Howard C. Eberline Memorial Scholarship, Kansas State University

== Publications ==
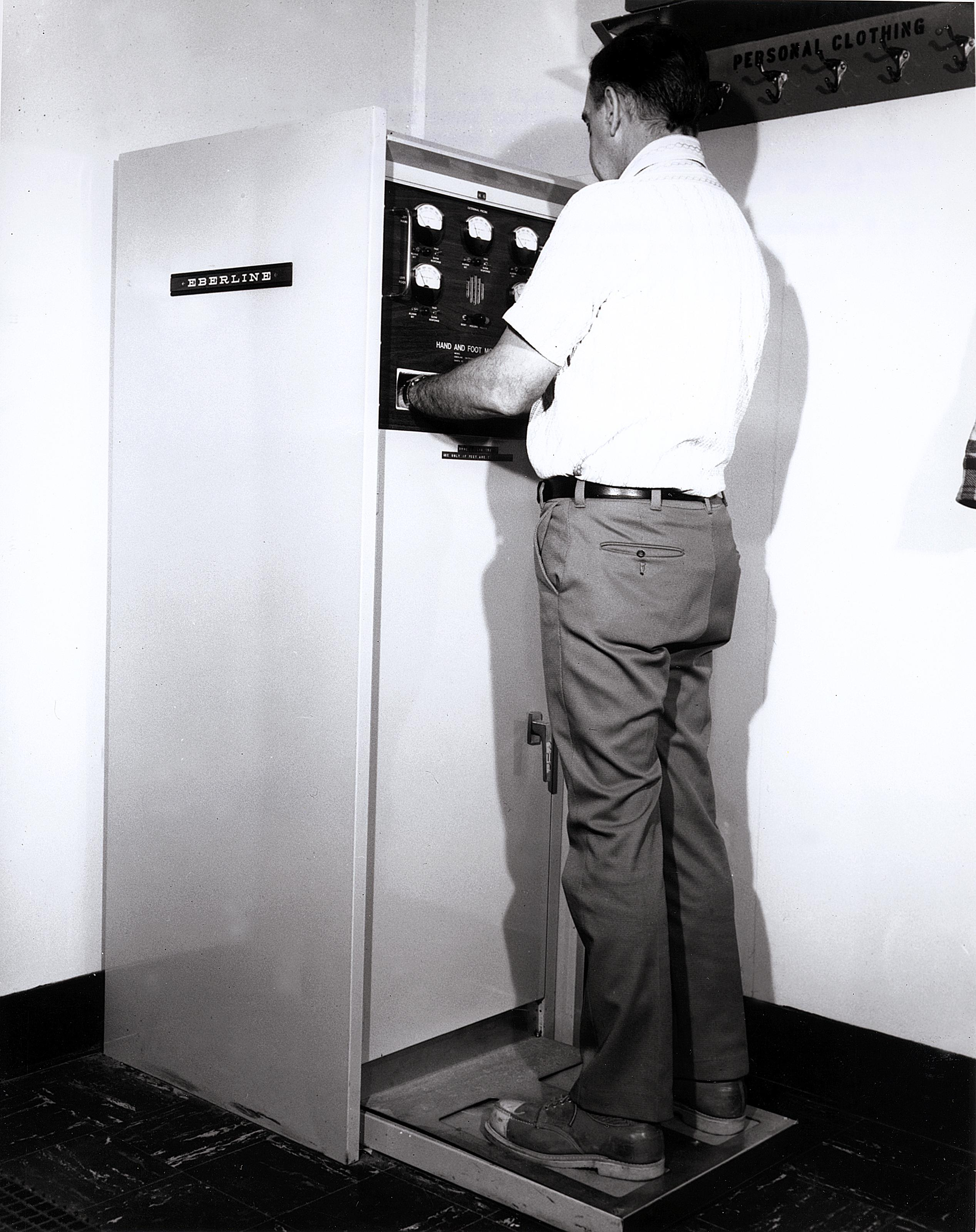
Eberline Hand and Foot monitor

=== Selected works ===
- Portable alpha survey instrumentation, 1958.

=== Patents ===
- Proportional counter, 1960.
- Underground exploration apparatus, 1961.
- Differential density x-ray film analyzer, 1961.
- Air sampler, 1963.
- Plutonium Detector, 1964.
- Scintillation detector and circuit for low-energy radioactive plutonium, 1964.
- Single channel remote radiation monitor with means to prevent drift in the photomultiplier tube, 1965.
- Building air monitor, 1965.
- Image contour plotter, 1965.
- Gamma dose rate meter utilizing a scintillation detector, 1966.
- High level remote radiation monitor, 1966.
- Fast and slow neutron counter, 1966.
- Portable radiation survey instrument assembly, 1967.
- Electrical cable and borehole logging system, 1973.
- Logging method and apparatus, 1978.
