= Samuel King Allison =

American nuclear scientist (1900–1965)

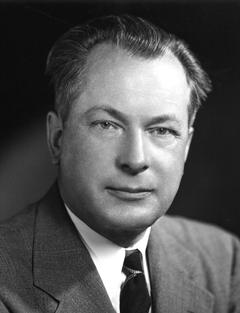
- Born: November 13, 1900; Chicago, Illinois, U.S.
- Died: September 15, 1965 (aged 64); Chicago, Illinois, U.S.
- Education: University of Chicago (B.S. 1921, Ph.D. 1923)
- Known for: Manhattan Project
- Awards: Medal for Merit (1946)
- Scientific career
- Fields: Physics
- Workplaces: University of California, Berkeley; University of Chicago; Los Alamos National Laboratory
- Thesis: Atomic Stability III, the Effects of Electrical Discharge and High Temperature (1923)
- Doctoral advisor: William Draper Harkins
- Doctoral students: James Cronin; Nicholas M. Smith

Samuel King Allison (November 13, 1900 – September 15, 1965) was an American physicist, most notable for his role in the Manhattan Project, for which he was awarded the Medal for Merit. A professor who studied X-rays, he was director of the Metallurgical Laboratory from 1943 until 1944, and later worked at the Los Alamos Laboratory — where he "rode herd" on the final stages of the project as part of the "Cowpuncher Committee", and read the countdown for the detonation of the Trinity nuclear test. After the war, he returned to the University of Chicago to direct the Institute for Nuclear Studies and was involved in the "scientists' movement", lobbying for civilian control of nuclear weapons.

== Early life ==
Allison was born in Chicago, Illinois, on November 13, 1900, the son of Samuel Buell Allison, an elementary school principal. He was educated at John Fiske Grammar School and Hyde Park High School. He entered the University of Chicago in 1917, and participated in varsity swimming and water basketball, while majoring in mathematics and chemistry. He graduated in 1921, and then embarked on his PhD in chemistry under the supervision of William Draper Harkins, writing his thesis on "Atomic Stability III, the Effects of Electrical Discharge and High Temperatures", a topic closely related to experimental physics.

Allison was a research fellow at Harvard University from 1923 until 1925 and then at the Carnegie Institution from 1925 until 1926. From 1926 until 1930 he taught physics at University of California, Berkeley as an instructor, and then as an associate professor. While there he met and married Helen Campbell. They had two children, a son, Samuel, and a daughter, Catherine.

== X-Rays ==
In 1930 Allison returned to the University of Chicago, where he became a professor in 1942, and the Frank P. Hixon Distinguished Service Professor of Physics in 1959. He studied the Compton effect and the dynamical theory of x-ray diffraction. At the time x-rays were an important means of investigating atomic structures, but the concept that light had both wave and particle properties, as demonstrated by Arthur Compton, was not universally accepted. William Duane from Harvard spearheaded an effort to prove that Compton's interpretation of the Compton effect was wrong, and Allison became part of this effort. Duane carried out a series of meticulous experiments to disprove Compton, but instead found overwhelming evidence that Compton was correct. To his credit, Duane conceded that this was the case.

One outcome of this was that Allison co-authored a textbook with Compton, X-rays in Theory and Experiment (1935), which became widely used. He developed a high resolution x-ray spectrometer with a graduate student, John Harry Williams. In 1935, Allison won a Guggenheim Fellowship to study at the Cavendish Laboratory at the University of Cambridge in England, where he studied under John Cockcroft. He published a paper in the Mathematical Proceedings of the Cambridge Philosophical Society on his "Experiments on the Efficiencies of Production and the Half-Lives of Radio-Carbon and Radio-Nitrogen". He was so impressed by the Cavendish Laboratory's Cockcroft–Walton accelerator that after returning to Chicago he built one.

== Manhattan Project ==
During World War II, Allison became involved in defence-related work. He was a consultant to the National Defense Research Committee (NDRC) from October 1940 to January 1941. In January 1941 the NDRC let him a contract to study the possibility of using beryllium as a neutron moderator. The team he assembled in Chicago would grow into the Manhattan Project's Metallurgical Laboratory.

In September 1941, Allison joined the S-1 Section, which coordinated the early investigations into the feasibility of an atomic bomb. He began building a reactor in the squash courts under the disused stands of Stagg Field. He became head of the Metallurgical Laboratory's chemistry section in January 1942, and in March, his small experimental reactor using beryllium came closer to criticality than the graphite-moderated design of Enrico Fermi's group at Columbia University. During 1942, Compton brought all the research groups working on plutonium and nuclear reactor design at Columbia University, Princeton University and the University of California together at the Metallurgical Laboratory in Chicago. Allison was placed in charge of the experimental work.

By October 1942, the Metallurgical Laboratory had to consider how it would proceed with designing large production reactors when they had yet to get an experimental reactor to work. Fermi favored taking small steps, while Allison and Eugene Wigner argued that larger steps were necessary if atomic bombs were to be developed in time to affect the course of the war. The Director of the Manhattan Project, Brigadier General Leslie R. Groves, Jr., told them that time was more important than money, and if two approaches looked promising, they should build both. In the end, this was what was done. Allison was one of 49 scientists who watched the project take a leap forward when Chicago Pile-1 went critical at Stagg Field on December 2, 1942. As Compton's reactor project began to spread outside Chicago in 1943, Allison became director of the Metallurgical Laboratory in June 1943.

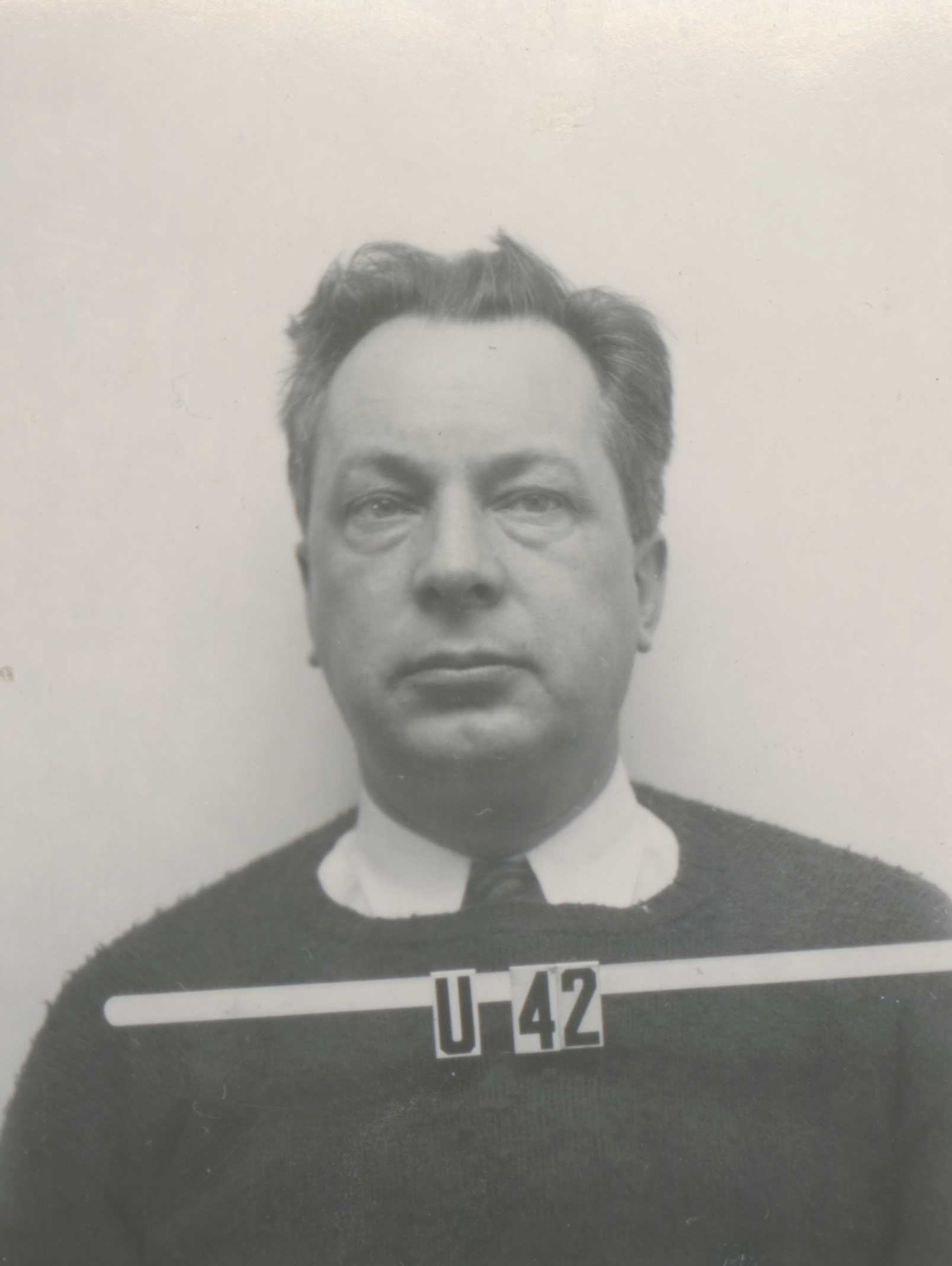
Allison's Los Alamos Laboratory identity photo

By late 1944, the locus of the Manhattan Project had shifted to the Los Alamos Laboratory in New Mexico, and Allison went there in November 1944 as the chairman of the Technical and Scheduling Committee. He was able to inform Groves in March 1945 that an implosion-type nuclear weapon would be ready for testing in July. Allison formed part of the "Cowpuncher Committee" that "rode herd" on the implosion project, ensuring that it stayed on track and on schedule. Fittingly, he was the one who read the countdown over the loudspeakers at the Trinity nuclear test in July 1945. Groves presented Allison with the Medal for Merit for his work on the Manhattan Project in a ceremony at the University of Chicago on January 12, 1946.

== Later life ==
After the war, Allison was director of the Enrico Fermi Institute of Nuclear Studies from 1946 until 1957, and again from 1963 until 1965. He was the chairman of the Physics Section of the National Research Council from 1960 to 1963, and chairman of its Committee on Nuclear Science from 1962 to 1965. He was active in the "scientist's movement" for the control of atomic weapons. The scientists successfully lobbied for nuclear weapons to be under civilian rather than military control, which was eventually written into the Atomic Energy Act of 1946. He was a strong opponent of secrecy in science, and, in an influential speech announcing the creation of the Enrico Fermi Institute said:

We are determined to return to free research as before the war. If secrecy is imposed on scientific research in physics, we will find all first-rate scientists working on subjects as innocuous as the colors of butterfly wings.

Allison rebuilt his accelerator, which he called the "kevatron", because it could accelerate particles to energies of 400 KeV. The name was a reference to the massive bevatron being built at the Lawrence Berkeley Laboratory, which was planned to accelerate particles to billions of electron volts. Allison still believed that there were useful results still to be found with low energies. He became a pioneer of what became known as "heavy ion physics", accelerating protons and deuterons, and using lithium and beryllium as targets. The data on these reactions of light elements would subsequently prove useful in the study of stellar nucleosynthesis.

Later, Allison acquired a 2 MeV Van de Graaff generator, and he recalled an old paper on producing lithium ions from minerals like Eucryptite. This allowed him to produce a 1.2 MeV lithium ion beam. He created hitherto unknown isotopes of boron and other light elements, and measured their neutron capture cross sections. A side effect of this work was a method to analyze surface materials where chemical analysis was unavailable. His colleague Anthony L. Turkevich subsequently used this to analyze the makeup of the Moon on the later Surveyor program missions. Allison continued to take on Ph.D. candidates, some of whom, such as James Cronin went on to distinguished careers.

Allison died of complications following an aortic aneurism on September 15, 1965, while attending the Plasma Physics and Controlled Nuclear Fusion Research Conference in Culham, England. His papers are kept at the American Institute of Physics.

== Bibliography ==
- Compton, Arthur Holly; Allison, Samuel K. (1935). X-rays in Theory and Experiment. New York: Van Nostrand Reinhold.
