= Willard Libby =

American physical chemist (1908–1980)

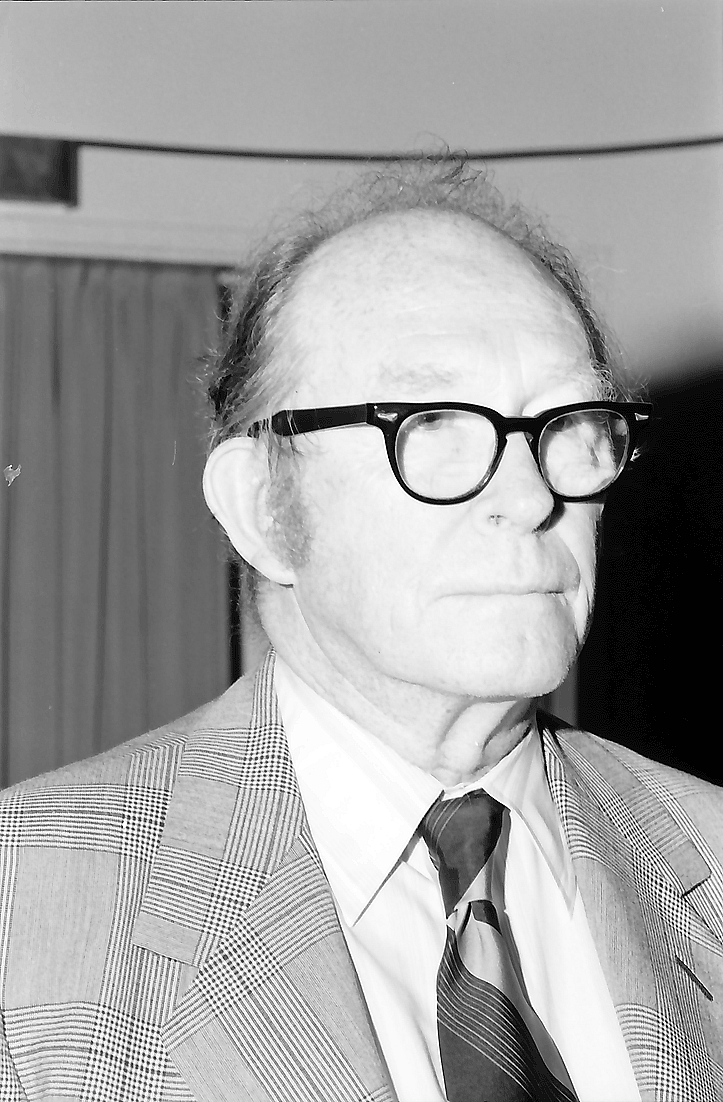
- Born: Willard Frank Libby; December 17, 1908; Parachute, Colorado, U.S.
- Died: September 8, 1980 (aged 71); Los Angeles, California, U.S.
- Education: University of California, Berkeley (BS, PhD)
- Known for: Radiocarbon dating
- Spouses: Leonor Hickey (m. 1940; div. 1966) Leona Woods Marshall (m. 1967)
- Children: 2
- Awards: Elliott Cresson Medal (1957); Willard Gibbs Award (1958); Joseph Priestley Award (1959); Albert Einstein Award (1959); Nobel Prize in Chemistry (1960); Arthur L. Day Medal (1961)
- Scientific career
- Fields: Physical chemistry
- Workplaces: University of California, Berkeley; SAM Laboratories; Columbia University; University of Chicago; University of California, Los Angeles
- Thesis: Radioactivity of ordinary elements, especially samarium and neodymium: method of detection (1933)
- Doctoral advisor: Wendell Mitchell Latimer
- Doctoral students: Maurice Sanford Fox; Frank Sherwood Rowland

Willard Frank Libby (December 17, 1908 – September 8, 1980) was an American physical chemist noted for his role in the 1949 development of radiocarbon dating, a process which revolutionized archaeology and palaeontology. For his contributions to the team that developed this process, Libby was awarded the Nobel Prize in Chemistry in 1960.

A 1931 chemistry graduate of the University of California, Berkeley, from which he received his doctorate in 1933, he studied radioactive elements and developed sensitive Geiger counters to measure weak natural and artificial radioactivity. During World War II he worked in the Manhattan Project's Substitute Alloy Materials (SAM) Laboratories at Columbia University, developing the gaseous diffusion process for uranium enrichment.

After the war, Libby accepted a professorship at the University of Chicago's Institute for Nuclear Studies, where he developed the technique for dating organic compounds using carbon-14. He also discovered that tritium similarly could be used for dating water, and therefore wine. In 1950, he became a member of the General Advisory Committee (GAC) of the Atomic Energy Commission (AEC). He was appointed a commissioner in 1954, becoming its sole scientist. He sided with Edward Teller on pursuing a crash program to develop the hydrogen bomb, participated in the Atoms for Peace program, and defended the administration's atmospheric nuclear testing.

Libby resigned from the AEC in 1959 to become professor of chemistry at University of California, Los Angeles (UCLA), a position he held until his retirement in 1976. In 1962, he became the director of the University of California statewide Institute of Geophysics and Planetary Physics (IGPP). He started the first Environmental Engineering program at UCLA in 1972, and as a member of the California Air Resources Board, he worked to develop and improve California's air pollution standards.

== Early life and career ==
Willard Frank Libby was born in Parachute, Colorado, on December 17, 1908, the son of farmers Ora Edward Libby and his wife Eva May (née Rivers). He had two brothers, Elmer and Raymond, and two sisters, Eva and Evelyn. Libby began his education in a two-room Colorado schoolhouse. When he was five, Libby's parents moved to Santa Rosa, California. He attended Analy High School, in Sebastopol, from which he graduated in 1926. Libby, who grew to be 6 feet 2 inches (188 cm) tall, played tackle on the high school football team.

In 1927 he entered the University of California, Berkeley, where he received his BS in 1931, and his PhD in 1933, writing his doctoral thesis on the "Radioactivity of ordinary elements, especially samarium and neodymium: method of detection" under the supervision of Wendell Mitchell Latimer. Independently of the work of George de Hevesy and Max Pahl, he discovered that the natural long-lived isotopes of samarium primarily decay by emission of alpha particles.

Libby was appointed Instructor in the department of chemistry at the University of California, Berkeley, in 1933. He became an assistant professor of chemistry there in 1938. He spent the 1930s building sensitive Geiger counters to measure weak natural and artificial radioactivity. He joined Berkeley's chapter of Alpha Chi Sigma in 1941. That year he was awarded a Guggenheim Fellowship, and elected to work at Princeton University.

== Manhattan Project ==
On December 8, 1941, the day after the Japanese attack on Pearl Harbor brought the United States into World War II, Libby volunteered his services to Nobel Prize laureate Harold Urey. Urey arranged for Libby to be given leave from the University of California, Berkeley, and to join him at Columbia University to work on the Manhattan Project, the wartime project to develop atomic bombs, at what became its Substitute Alloy Materials (SAM) Laboratories. During his time in the New York City area, Libby was a resident of Leonia, New Jersey.

Over the next three years, Libby worked on the gaseous diffusion process for uranium enrichment. An atomic bomb required fissile material, and the fissile uranium-235 made up only 0.7 percent of natural uranium. The SAM Laboratories therefore had to find a way of separating kilograms of it from the more abundant uranium-238. Gaseous diffusion worked on the principle that a lighter gas diffuses through a barrier faster than a heavier one at a rate inversely proportional to its molecular weight. But the only known gas containing uranium was the highly corrosive uranium hexafluoride, and a suitable barrier was hard to find.

Through 1942, Libby and his team studied different barriers and the means to protect them from corrosion from the uranium hexafluoride. The most promising type was a barrier made of powdered nickel developed by Edward O. Norris of the Jelliff Manufacturing Corporation and Edward Adler from the City College of New York, which became known as the "Norris-Adler" barrier by late 1942.

In addition to developing a suitable barrier, the SAM Laboratories also had to assist in the design of a gaseous separation plant, which became known as K-25. Libby helped with the engineers from Kellex to produce a workable design for a pilot plant. Libby conducted a series of tests that indicated that the Norris-Adler barrier would work, and he remained confident that with an all-out effort, the remaining problems with it could be solved. Although doubts remained, construction work began on the K-25 full-scale production plant in September 1943.

As 1943 gave way to 1944, many problems remained. Tests began on the machinery at K-25 in April 1944 without a barrier. Attention turned to a new process developed by Kellex. Finally, in July 1944, Kellex barriers began to be installed in K-25. K-25 commenced operation in February 1945, and as cascade after cascade came online, the quality of the product increased. By April 1945, K-25 had attained a 1.1% enrichment. Uranium partially enriched in K-25 was fed into the calutrons at Y-12 to complete the enrichment process.

Construction of the upper stages of the K-25 plant was cancelled, and Kellex was directed to instead design and build a 540-stage side feed unit, which became known as K-27. The last of K-25's 2,892 stages commenced operation in August 1945. On August 5, K-25 starting producing feed enriched to 23 percent uranium-235. K-25 and K-27 achieved their full potential only in the early postwar period, when they eclipsed the other production plants and became the prototypes for a new generation of plants. Enriched uranium was used in the Little Boy bomb employed in the bombing of Hiroshima on August 6, 1945. Libby brought home a stack of newspapers and told his wife, "This is what I've been doing."

== Radiocarbon dating ==
After the war, Libby accepted an offer from the University of Chicago of a professorship in the chemistry department at the new Institute for Nuclear Studies. He returned to his pre-war studies of radioactivity. In 1939, Serge Korff had discovered that cosmic rays generated neutrons in the upper atmosphere. These interact with nitrogen-14 in the air to produce carbon-14:

^{1}n + ^{14}N → ^{14}C + ^{1}p

The half-life of carbon-14 is 5,730±40 years. Libby realized that when plants and animals die they cease to ingest fresh carbon-14, thereby giving any organic compound a built-in nuclear clock. He published his theory in 1946, and expanded on it in his monograph Radiocarbon Dating in 1955. He also developed sensitive radiation detectors that could make the measurements required by the technique. Tests against sequoia with known dates from their tree rings showed radiocarbon dating to be reliable and accurate. The technique revolutionised archaeology, palaeontology and other disciplines that dealt with ancient artefacts. In 1960, he was awarded the Nobel Prize in Chemistry "for his method to use carbon-14 for age determination in archaeology, geology, geophysics, and other branches of science". He also discovered that tritium similarly could be used for dating water, and therefore wine.

== Atomic Energy Commission ==
Atomic Energy Commission (AEC) Chairman Gordon Dean appointed Libby to its influential General Advisory Committee (GAC) in 1950. In 1954, he was appointed an AEC commissioner by President Dwight D. Eisenhower on the recommendation of Dean's successor, Lewis Strauss. Libby and his family moved from Chicago to Washington, D.C. He brought with him a truckload of scientific equipment, which he used to establish a laboratory at the Carnegie Institution there to continue his studies of amino acids. Staunchly conservative politically, he was one of the few scientists who sided with Edward Teller rather than Robert Oppenheimer during the debate on whether it was wise to pursue a crash program to develop the hydrogen bomb. As a commissioner, Libby played an important role in promoting Eisenhower's Atoms for Peace program, and was part of the United States delegation at the Geneva Conferences on Peaceful Uses of Atomic Energy in 1955 and 1958.

As the only scientist among the five AEC commissioners, it fell to Libby to defend the Eisenhower administration's stance on atmospheric nuclear testing. He argued that the dangers of radiation from nuclear tests were less than that from chest X-rays, and therefore less important than the risk of having an inadequate nuclear arsenal, but his arguments failed to convince the scientific community or reassure the public. In January 1956, he publicly revealed the existence of Project Sunshine, a series of secret research studies to ascertain the impact of radioactive fallout on the world's population that he had initiated in 1953 while serving on the GAC. The project caused controversy after it was revealed to the public and with the revelation it was found out that much of the research involved stealing the bodies of dead children without the parents' consent and doing radioactive experiments on them. Many of the 1,500 sample cadavers were babies and young children, and were taken from countries from Australia to Europe, often without their parents' consent or knowledge. By 1958, even Libby and Teller were supporting limits on atmospheric nuclear testing.

== UCLA ==
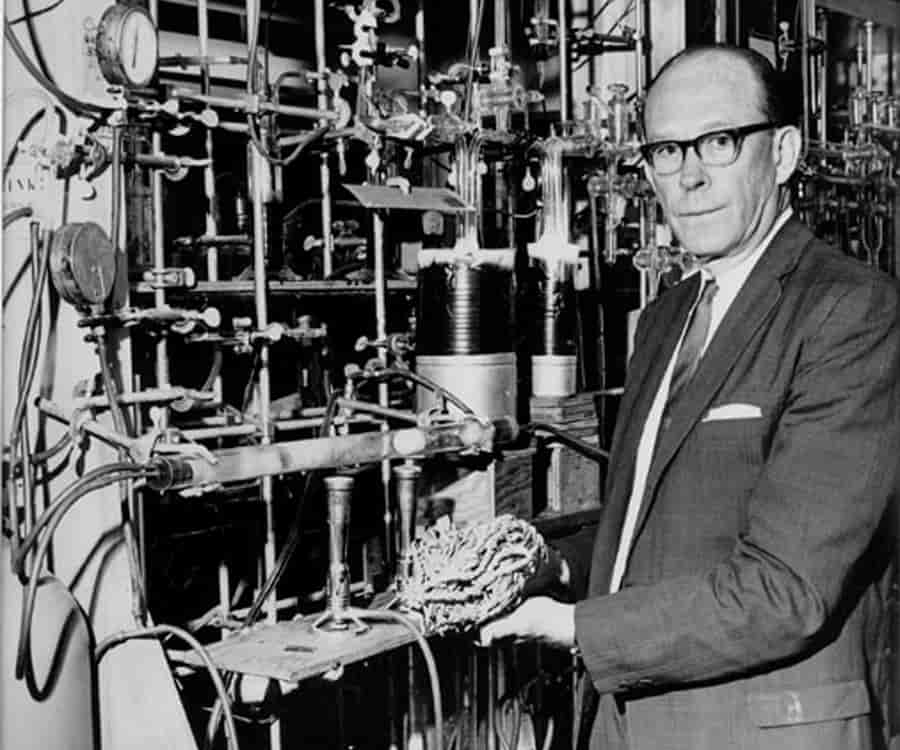
Libby in the lab, c. 1960s

Libby resigned from the AEC in 1959, and he became professor of chemistry at University of California, Los Angeles, a position he held until his retirement in 1976. He taught honors freshman chemistry. In 1962, he became the director of the University of California statewide Institute of Geophysics and Planetary Physics (IGPP), a position he also held until 1976. His time as director encompassed the Apollo space program and the lunar landings.

Libby started the first Environmental Engineering program at UCLA in 1972. As a member of the California Air Resources Board, he worked to develop and improve California's air pollution standards. He established a research program to investigate heterogeneous catalysis with the idea of reducing emissions from motor vehicles through more complete fuel combustion. The election of Richard Nixon as president in 1968 generated speculation that Libby might be appointed as Presidential Science Advisor. There was a storm of protest from scientists who felt that Libby was too conservative, and the offer was not made.

Although Libby retired and became a professor emeritus in 1976, he remained professionally active until his death in 1980.

== Awards and honors ==
Libby was an elected member of the National Academy of Sciences, the American Academy of Arts and Sciences, and the American Philosophical Society. In addition to the Nobel Prize, he received numerous honors and awards, including Columbia University's Chandler Medal in 1954, the Remsen Memorial Lecture Award in 1955, the Bicentennial Lecture Award from the City College of New York and the Nuclear Applications in Chemistry Award in 1956, the Franklin Institute's Elliott Cresson Medal in 1957, the American Chemical Society's Willard Gibbs Award in 1958, the Joseph Priestley Award from Dickinson College and the Albert Einstein Medal in 1959, the Geological Society of America's Arthur L. Day Medal in 1961, the Golden Plate Award of the American Academy of Achievement in 1961, the Gold Medal of the American Institute of Chemists in 1970, and the Lehman Award from the New York Academy of Sciences in 1971. He was elected a member of the National Academy of Sciences in 1950. Analy High School library has a mural of Libby, and a Sebastopol city park and a nearby highway are named in his honor. His 1947 paper on radiocarbon dating was honored by a Citation for Chemical Breakthrough Award from the Division of History of Chemistry of the American Chemical Society presented to the University of Chicago in 2016.

== Personal life ==
In 1940, Libby married Leonor Hickey, a physical education teacher. They had twin daughters, Janet Eva and Susan Charlotte, who were born in 1945.

In 1966 Libby divorced Leonor and married Leona Woods Marshall, a distinguished nuclear physicist who was one of the original builders of Chicago Pile-1, the world's first nuclear reactor. She joined him at UCLA as a professor of environmental engineering in 1973. Through this second marriage he acquired two stepsons, the children of her first marriage.

Libby died at the UCLA Medical Center in Los Angeles on September 8, 1980, from a blood clot in his lung complicated by pneumonia. His papers are in the Charles E. Young Research Library at UCLA. Seven volumes of his papers were edited by Leona and Rainer Berger and published in 1981.

== Bibliography ==
- Arnold, J.R.; Libby, W.F. (October 10, 1946). Radiocarbon from Pile Graphite; Chemical Methods for Its Concentrations (PDF) (Report). pp. CC–3643, 4350390. doi:10.2172/4350390. OSTI 4350390.
- W.F. Libby (1946). "Atmospheric Helium Three and Radiocarbon from Cosmic Radiation". Physical Review. 69 (11–12): 671–672. Bibcode:1946PhRv...69..671L. doi:10.1103/PhysRev.69.671.2.
- Libby, Willard F., Radiocarbon dating, 2d ed., University of Chicago Press, 1955.
- Libby, W. F. (August 15, 1958). "Radioactive Fallout". Proceedings of the National Academy of Sciences. 44 (8): 800–820. Bibcode:1958PNAS...44..800L. doi:10.1073/pnas.44.8.800. PMC 534564. PMID 16590276.
- Libby, W. F. (August 4, 1958). Progress in the use of isotopes. The Atomic Triad - reactors, radioisotopes and radiation. Second United Nations International Conference on the Peaceful Uses of Atomic Energy. Atomic Energy Commission. OSTI 4325402.
- Libby, W. F. (August 1967). History of Radiocarbon Dating. Symposium on radioactive dating and methods of low-level counting. Monaco. pp. 3–25. OCLC 4433103714. OSTI 4582402.
- Libby, L. M.; Libby, W. F. (October 18, 1972). Vulcanism and radiocarbon dates. International radiocarbon dating conference. Wellington, New Zealand. CiteSeerX 10.1.1.736.4982. OSTI 4246295.
- Libby, W. F. (October 18, 1972). Radiocarbon dating, memories, and hopes. International Conference on Radiocarbon Dating. Wellington, New Zealand. CiteSeerX 10.1.1.473.4730. OSTI 4247579.
- Libby, W. F. (1981). Berger, Rainer; Libby, Leona Marshall (eds.). Collected papers. Santa Monica, California: Geo Science Analytical. ISBN 978-0-941054-00-3. (7 volumes)
