= Lester Skaggs =

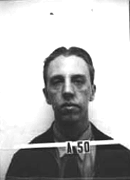
Lester S. Skaggs Los Alamos ID

Lester Skaggs (November 21, 1911 – April 3, 2009) was an American nuclear physicist.

== Life and Times ==
Skaggs was born on November 21, 1911 in Trenton, Missouri. He grew up on a farm in northern Missouri. He attended a one-room schoolhouse and to get to high school, he had to ride a horse. Skaggs was the oldest of three children and his father planned for Skaggs to become a farmer. Instead, Skaggs had other interests and found amazement with tinkering, and enjoyed designing and building contraptions and made plans for a science career. He attended the University of Missouri and completed a B.S. in chemistry with a minor in mathematics in 1933 and M.S. in physics in 1934. He moved to Chicago in 1935, entered the University of Chicago and was accepted into the graduate program in nuclear physics. In 1939, Skaggs was awarded a Ph.D. in nuclear physics. At the University of Chicago, Skaggs had a post-doctoral fellowship in nuclear physics and secured part-time work at the Tumor Clinic at Michael Reese Hospital in radiation oncology. From 1941 – 1943, the war effort took him to Washington, D.C. where he served at the Carnegie Institution of Washington in the Department of Terrestrial Magnetism. Skaggs worked with physicist Nicholas Smith to design an airplane proximity detection system that utilized radio waves to locate and detonate anti-aircraft shells.

== Manhattan Project ==
In 1943, he was sent to the Manhattan Project at Los Alamos, New Mexico, working under Robert Oppenheimer to develop the atomic bomb. At Los Alamos, Skaggs was charged with the task of adapting the anti-aircraft detection system into a failsafe "fuse" for the first bomb that would be used against Japan.

From a distance of 20 miles, Skaggs witnessed the first test at Alamogordo, New Mexico. Skaggs immediately understood that the current plans left an unacceptable amount of time for the bombardiers to safely escape from the drop zone. He developed a system with two back-up systems that allowed additional time to for the plane and crew to make a secure exit from the skies over Japan.

== Michael Reese Hospital ==
When World War II ended Skaggs returned home to Chicago and went back to work on the medical applications of radiation. He resumed his work at Michael Reese Hospital and collaborated with Donald Kerst on a physics research project. The goal was to utilize a Betatron to extract an electron beam for medical use. The betatron was invented by Kerst for physics experiments.

As serendipity often plays a role in medical and scientific developments, sometimes accompanied by a dose of irony, chance presented a member of the team, who was a promising physics graduate student. The student was diagnosed with a brain tumor, glioblastoma multiformae and no current treatment options available for the tumor. The first clinical use of the high energy Betatron radiation for medical therapy proved beneficial to effectively reduce the mass of the tumor, yet not sufficient to eliminate the tumor and provide a cure.

== University of Chicago ==
In 1948, Skaggs accepted a faculty appointment as assistant professor of radiology at the University of Chicago. In 1949, he took the promotion to associate professor with the responsibility for the development of radiation therapy equipment and facilities at Argonne Cancer Research Hospital (ACRH). The Atomic Energy Commission program, titled "Atoms for Peace" funded the facilities at ACRH. In 1953, the ACRH was among the initial list of hospitals dedicated to radiation therapy for cancer treatment.

At ACRH, the next project for the Skaggs and Lanzl team was the design of a cobalt treatment unit.

The duo of Skaggs and Lanzl began in the 1950s another project. This time the goal was to develop and establish a graduate program in medical physics, perhaps the first in the United States. In the 1960s, a doctorate program was launched that would award a Ph.D. degree in medical physics.

In 1956, Skaggs, received a promotion to full professor. He designed and built an analog computer to calculate the radiation dose to tissue to be utilized in treatment plans for radiation therapy. The ‘computer’ was finally running by 1963 and the components occupied a small room.

In the 1970s, Franca T. Kuchnir and Skaggs developed a method to produce neutrons for radiation therapy, maybe the first fast-neutron therapy facility in the United States.
