= Henry H. Barschall =

German-American physicist (1915–1997)

- Born: April 29, 1917; Berlin, Germany
- Died: February 4, 1997 (aged 79); Madison, Wisconsin
- Education: Princeton University (AM, 1939) (PhD, 1940)
- Known for: Contributed to the understanding of neutron physics and its applications to medical radiotherapy and fusion technology
- Awards: Tom W. Bonner Prize (1965)
- Scientific career
- Fields: Nuclear Physics
- Workplaces: Princeton University; University of Kansas; Manhattan Project, Los Alamos Laboratory; University of Wisconsin–Madison

Henry Herman ("Heinz") Barschall (April 29, 1915 – February 4, 1997) was a German-American physicist.

== Biography ==
Barschall was born as Heinrich Hermann Barschall in Berlin, Germany; his father was a patent attorney who had received a Ph.D. in chemistry after studying with Nobel Laureates Emil Fischer and Fritz Haber. After beginning study at several universities in Germany, he emigrated to the United States in 1937 during the early Holocaust period; though raised as a Lutheran, he had some Jewish ancestry. He received his Ph.D. from Princeton University in 1940 under the direction of Rudolf Ladenburg; he also worked closely with John A. Wheeler. After a suggestion by Niels Bohr, he carried out in only a few days with fellow graduate student Morton H. Kanner the first demonstration of fission by fast neutrons and thorium and uranium. His thesis was on the interaction of fast neutrons with helium. In a paper with John A. Wheeler he reported the discovery of spin-orbit coupling in neutron scattering.

He worked at the University of Kansas, and then at the Manhattan Project in Los Alamos, New Mexico continuing his work with fast neutrons. In 1946 he joined the University of Wisconsin–Madison, where he remained for most of his career following a program on determining fast neutron cross-sections, directing the doctoral dissertation research of over forty students. In 1970, his laboratory was destroyed by a terrorist attack on a military research facility there, which seriously injured one of his graduate students and killed a member of another research group. In dismay, he stopped work in nuclear physics, and left for two years at the Lawrence Livermore Laboratories where he worked on the development of intense sources of high-energy neutrons for materials testing and medical uses. Returning to Wisconsin, with a joint appointment in the departments of Nuclear Engineering and Physics—and, later, also Medical Physics, he concentrated on the medical application of neutrons in cancer therapy until his retirement in 1986. He was elected a Fellow of the American Academy of Arts and Sciences in 1987. His doctoral students include Charles K. Bockelman.

== Legacy and other notable works ==
Barschall was the first recipient of the Bonner Prize, an editor of Nuclear Physics Review C, a member of the board of the American Institute of Physics, and a member of the National Academy of Sciences.

He was editor of Physical Review C for 15 years, and chairman of the publications committee of the American Physical Society.

In addition to his scientific work, he was noted for an article he published in Physics Today discussing the cost of scientific journals. In this article he demonstrated the dramatically lower costs associated with publishing in non-profit society journals as compared to those of commercial publishers. This article provoked a lawsuit from Gordon and Breach, one of the publishers discussed—the one with the highest costs. The company sued Barschall, the American Physical Society, and the American Institute of Physics, in the United States and in several countries in Europe. The eventual decision fully supported Barschall.

His autobiography appears at H.H. Barschall, "Reminiscences," Physics in Perspective 1 (1999) 390–444.

Barschall died at age 81 on February 4, 1997 in Madison, WI.
