= Charles K. Bockelman =

American nuclear physicist

Charles Kincaid Bockelman (November 29, 1922 – June 6, 2002) was an American nuclear physicist and deputy provost of Yale University. He was a member of the New York Academy of Sciences.

== Career ==
Charles Bockelman's career started in the Washington, D.C., office of Senator Harry S. Truman while he studied physics and chemistry at George Washington University. During World War II he served in the United States Army Air Corps in the Pacific Theater of Operations. After the war he earned his Ph.B. (1947) and Ph.D. (1951) degrees from the University of Wisconsin. As a graduate student, Bockelman concentrated on nuclear physics and went on to do research at the Massachusetts Institute of Technology before joining the Yale faculty in 1955 as an assistant professor. He was promoted to associate professor in 1958 and professor in 1965. In 1969 he was awarded a Guggenheim Fellowship.

During his early years at Yale, Bockelman used a 4 MeV high-intensity electron accelerator and MIT's Van de Graaff accelerator. In the 1960s the Arthur W. Wright Nuclear Structure Laboratory at Yale centered on a tandem Van de Graaff heavy ion accelerator. There, Bockelman took over the responsibility for the implementation of a large multigap magnetic spectrometer, which became the focus of his research for the next decade at the laboratory.

Bockelman taught elementary and advanced courses in Yale College and the Graduate School. In 1966 he became director of the physical sciences at Yale, and three years later, deputy provost for science. During his 20 years in the Provost's Office he facilitated the construction of new buildings, implementation of computer systems, worked with new and senior faculty and oversaw the growth of the sciences. He also served as acting dean of the Graduate School, in 1975, and again during the 1983-1984 academic year.

He published numerous papers with students and colleagues, in addition to over fifty scientific papers and articles in major scientific publications. During his career, his research focused on nuclear physics and in the late 1950s, he developed an important correlation between neutron transfer and neutron capture reactions which served as a cornerstone of the then-emerging utilization of these reactions for the measurement of nuclear structure. He was named to the New York Academy of Sciences in 1963.

== Family ==
Bockelman died on June 6, 2002, in Newtown, Connecticut. He was survived by his wife Christina, his daughter, Faith Edwards, grandchildren Torrie and Dillon Edwards, and a stepson, Michael Nesi. The Bockelmans were enthusiastic horse owners and participated in the hunt activities of Fairfield County, Connecticut.
