= Berlyn Brixner =

American photographer

Berlyn B. Brixner
- Born: May 21, 1911; El Paso, Texas, US
- Died: August 1, 2009 (aged 98); Albuquerque, New Mexico, US
- Education: University of Texas
- Known for: Trinity test photographer
- Spouses: Betty (m.c. 1940); Audrey Chew, 1915–1996 (m. 1956)
- Children: 2

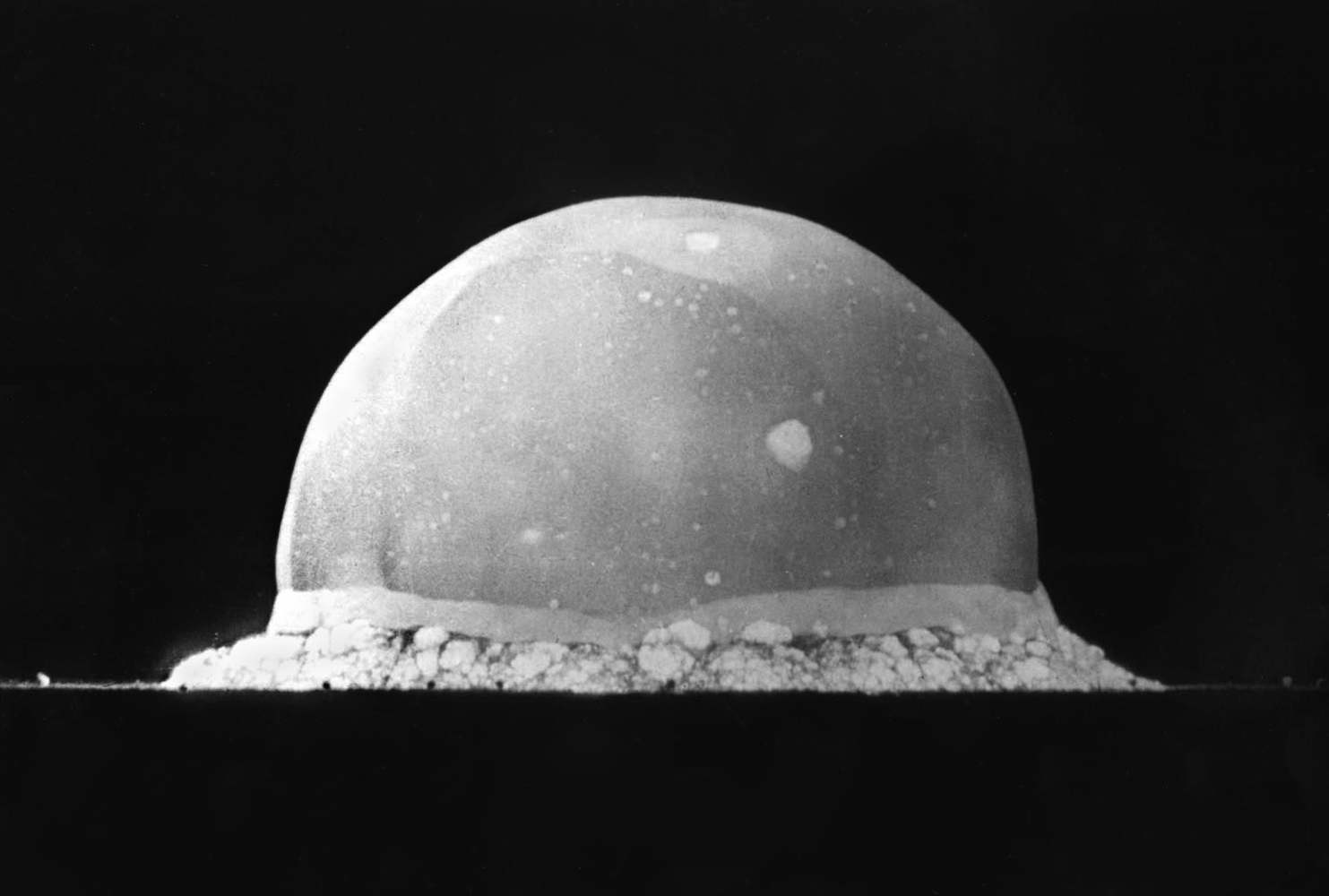
Trinity Test Fireball, 16ms after ignition. This may be Brixner's best-known photo.

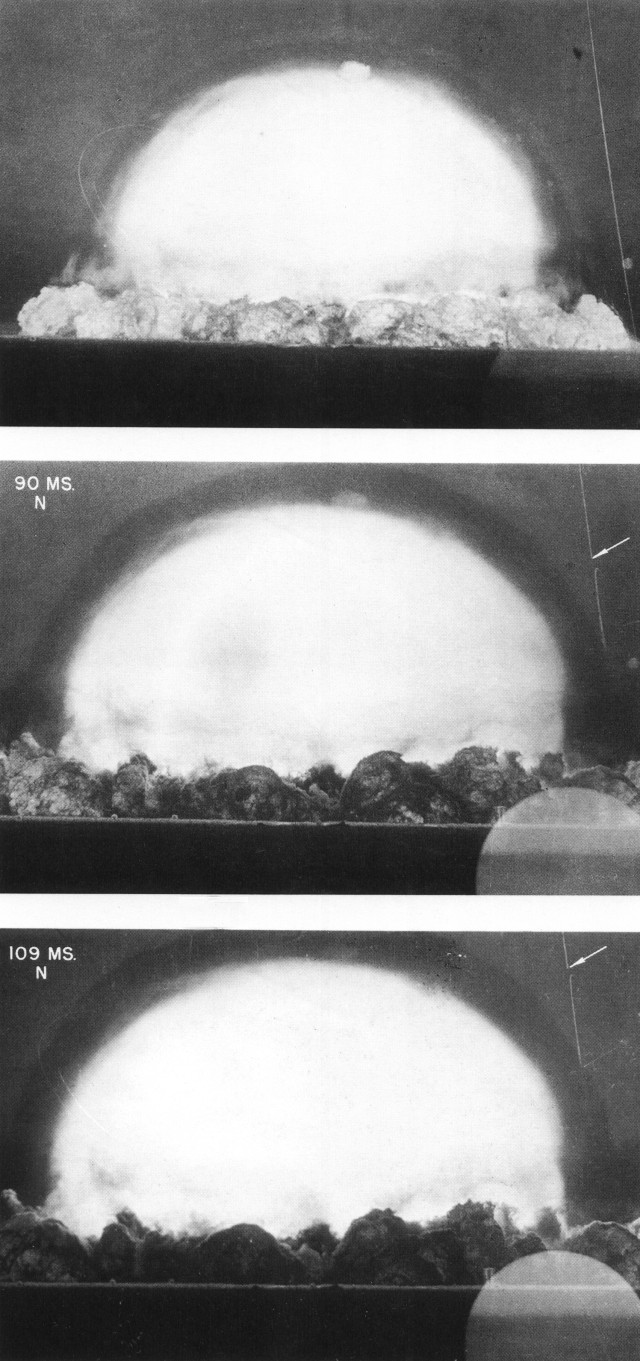
One of Brixner's film strips of the Trinity test

Berlyn B. Brixner (May 21, 1911 – August 1, 2009) was an American photographer. He was the head photographer for the Trinity test, the first detonation of a nuclear weapon in July 1945. Brixner was positioned 10,000 yards (9,100 m) away from the explosion and had 50 cameras of varying speeds running from different locations to capture the shot in full motion.

== Early years ==
He was born in El Paso, Texas on May 21, 1911. His mother had graduated from Western New Mexico University in 1898 and taught school in various small southern New Mexico communities. His father was a power systems engineer for a mining company, and had worked in Chile, Mexico and the Fanny Mine in Mogollon, New Mexico until the Army commandeered its boxcar-size generators at the beginning of World War II turning Mogollon into a ghost town.

On December 11, 1932, he fell into Kilbourne Hole near Lanark, New Mexico and broke his ankle.

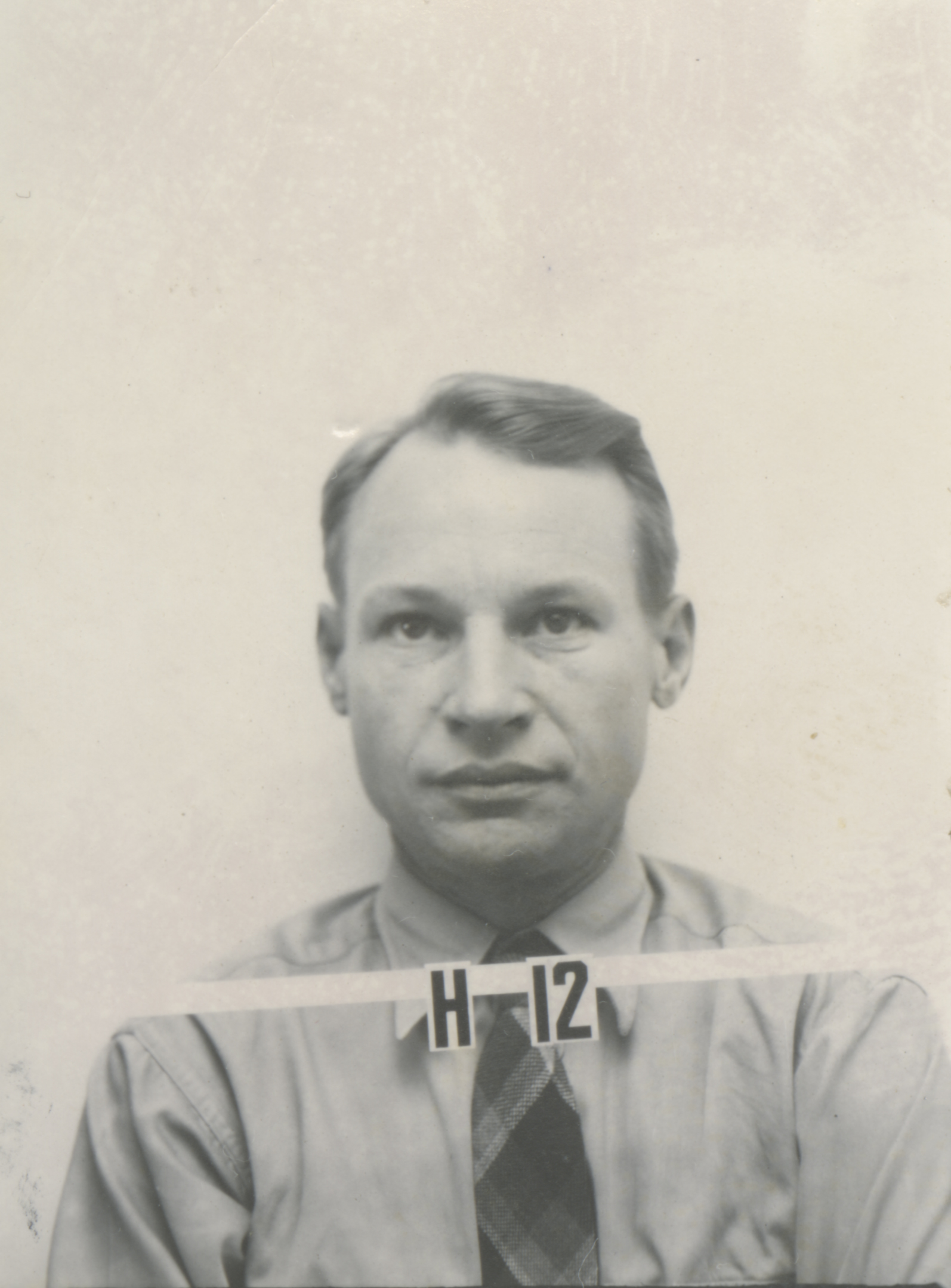
Brixner's Los Alamos badge

Brixner attended the University of Texas at Austin for four years without earning a degree, then worked and studied photography under Willis W. Waite, who operated a pathology laboratory in El Paso. In 1936, Brixner worked as a regional photographer with the Soil Conservation Service at its four-state headquarters in Albuquerque, New Mexico. He married his first wife, Betty, around 1940. His two daughters, Annette (born 1942) and Kathleen (born 1943) were born in Albuquerque. During World War II, he was hired at the Los Alamos National Laboratory to work on photography problems connected with the Manhattan Project in the Optics Engineering and High Speed Photography Group in Los Alamos under the direction of Professor Julian Mack, the group invented and constructed extremely high speed cameras.

== Trinity ==
Brixner was assigned to shoot movies in 16-millimeter black-and-white film, from every angle and distance and at every available speed, of an unknown event beginning with the brightest flash ever produced on Earth. "The theoretical people had calculated a some 10-sun brightness. So that was easy," said Brixner. "All I had to do was go out and point my camera at the sun and take some pictures. Ten times that was easy to calculate."

At ignition, Brixner remembers "The whole filter seemed to light up as bright as the sun. I was temporarily blinded. I looked to the side. The Oscura mountains were as bright as day. I saw this tremendous ball of fire, and it was rising. I was just spellbound! I followed it as it rose. Then it dawned on me. I'm the photographer! I've gotta get that ball of fire." He jogged the camera up. He said: "There was no sound! It all took place in absolute silence."

== Later years ==
After the war, he stayed on at Los Alamos National Laboratory until retirement as head of the optical group. In 1956 he married Audrey Chew (1915–1996) who was from Washington, DC. Berlyn Brixner died peacefully in Albuquerque on August 1, 2009. He was 98.

== Legacy ==
His papers are archived at Los Alamos National Laboratory. He authored or co-authored over 45 papers describing major developments in camera engineering, optical instrumentation and fabrication techniques. His optical lens design was used to construct a high resolution telescope mounted on the Mariner 1969 and 1970 spacecraft to Mars. He received the DuPont gold medal from the Society of Motion Picture and Television Engineers and the Robert Gordon Memorial Award from the Society of Photo-Optical Instrumentation Engineers.

== Patents ==
- U.S. patent 2,732,777 Ultra High Speed Shutter (1953)
- U.S. patent 2,668,473 Continuous Recording High Speed Camera Frame (1954)
- U.S. patent 3,278,752 Wide Angle Optical System Having a Telecentric Stop (1966)

== See also ==
- Jack Aeby – photographer of the only successful color picture of the Trinity Test.
