= Project SUNSHINE =

Series of US government research studies

Project SUNSHINE was a series of research studies that began in 1953 to ascertain the impact of radioactive fallout on the world's population. The project was initially kept secret, and only became known publicly in 1956. Commissioned jointly by the United States Atomic Energy Commission and USAF Project Rand, SUNSHINE sought to examine the long-term effects of nuclear radiation on the biosphere due to repeated nuclear detonations of increasing yield. With the conclusion from Project GABRIEL that radioactive isotope Strontium-90 (Sr-90) represented the most serious threat to human health from nuclear fallout, Project SUNSHINE sought to measure the global dispersion of Sr-90 by measuring its concentration in the tissues and bones of the dead. Of particular interest was tissue from the young, whose developing bones have the highest propensity to accumulate Sr-90 and thus the highest susceptibility to radiation damage. SUNSHINE elicited a great deal of controversy when it was revealed that many of the remains sampled were utilized without prior permission from relatives of the dead, which wasn't known until many years later.

== History ==
On January 18, 1955, then-AEC commissioner Dr. Willard Libby said that there was insufficient data regarding the effects of fallout due to a lack of human samples – especially samples taken from children – to analyze. Libby was quoted saying, "I don't know how to get them, but I do say that it is a matter of prime importance to get them, and particularly in the young age group. So, human samples are often of prime importance, and if anybody knows how to do a good job of body snatching, they will really be serving their country." This led to over 1,500 samples being gathered, of which only 500 were analyzed. Many of the 1,500 sample cadavers were babies and young children, and were taken from countries from Australia to Europe, often without their parents' consent or knowledge. According to the investigation launched after a British newspaper reported that British scientists had obtained children’s bodies from various hospitals and shipped their body parts to the United States, a British mother had said that her stillborn baby's legs were removed by British doctors, and to prevent her from finding out what had happened, she was not allowed to dress the baby for the funeral.

== Notable studies ==
In 1958, research for project SUNSHINE was brought to Belgium. Scientists started doing tests that were slightly different than those done previously in the United States and Europe by analyzing soils in agricultural regions instead of human bones. They headed in two main directions: environmental surveys and experimental research in natural and in controlled conditions. Their goal was to see the effect of Strontium-90 in the soils as well as to see how it transferred to the grass and grazing animals such as cows and sheep, the animals from which humans consume milk and meat. Researchers also looked for direct influences of strontium-90 by observing how well the contaminated grass and crops grew.

In a 1957 article, Dr. Whitlock, director of Health Education in the National Dairy Council, Chicago, Illinois, discussed the impact of strontium-90 in the cow milk consumed by humans, concluding that the effects of Sr-90 would not be detectably harmful to the general populace of the US. "From the foregoing information, it would seem we have a long way to go before the presence of Strontium-90 in milk and other foods can catch up with the amounts of radioactivity to which we have long been exposed through natural resources." Specifically referring to the natural radioactivity one is exposed to from potassium-40."

== See also ==
- Project GABRIEL
- Strontium-90
