= SS Broompark =

British cargo ship

Coordinates: 42°0′N 40°26′W

- The only known photograph of SS Broompark, taken in June 1940

History
- Name: SS Broompark
- Owner: J. & J. Denholm Ltd, Glasgow
- Operator: Denholm Line Steamers
- Port of registry: Greenock, United Kingdom
- Builder: Lithgows
- Yard number: 921
- Launched: 12 September 1939
- Identification: Code Letters GCBC; United Kingdom Official Number 168288
- Fate: Sunk 28 July 1942

General characteristics
- Type: Cargo ship
- Tonnage: 5,136 GRT, 3,057 NRT
- Length: 446 ft (136 m) overall
- Beam: 56 ft (17.1 m)
- Draft: 25 feet 9 inches (7.85 m)
- Depth: 24.8 ft (7.56 m)
- Installed power: 1,950 indicated horsepower (1,450 kW)
- Propulsion: 1 x 3 cyl. triple expansion engine, single shaft, 1 screw, cruiser stern
- Speed: 10.5 kn (19.4 km/h; 12.1 mph)
- Crew: 49

SS Broompark was a British cargo ship which was torpedoed by a U-boat on 25 July 1942 and sank three days later. Launched in October 1939, it was operated by the Denholm Line. In June 1940 as part of Operation Aerial it brought 33 French scientists including Lew Kowarski and Hans Halban, and their families to Britain before the Fall of France. They brought with them 26 cans containing 185 kilograms (408 lb) of heavy water, machine tools, and $10 million in diamonds. The ship was torpedoed on 21 September 1940, but made port under its own steam.

== Building ==
SS Broompark was built by Lithgows Limited in Port Glasgow, Scotland, for J. & J. Denholm Limited. It was launched in October 1939, and operated by the Denholm Line. A cargo ship of 5,136 gross register tons, it was 446 feet (136 m) long overall and 56 feet (17.1 m) abeam, with a depth of 24.8 feet (7.56 m). Her draught was 25 feet 9 inches (7.85 m) She was propelled by a three-cylinder triple expansion engine, with a single drive shaft and screw.

Broompark was allocated the Code Letters GCBC and the United Kingdom Official Number 168288. Her port of registry was Greenock, Renfrewshire. The ship's master was Captain Olaf Paulsen. Born in Christiania, Norway, in 1878, he had left when he was 14 and made his home in Leith, Scotland, becoming a British citizen in 1904. After starting out with Christian Salvesen as a cook, he had earned his master's certificate, and joined the Denholm Line. He had commanded SS Briarpark in the 1920s, but had been forced to retire in 1938 after running his ship aground. Soon after the Second World War broke out, Paulsen found himself in charge of the line's newest ship, and the most valuable cargo it had ever carried.

== Bordeaux ==
On 13 June 1940, Broompark entered Bordeaux harbour with a load of coal. She had sailed as part of convoy OG 33F in company with SS Earlspark, another vessel of the Denholm Line also carrying coal, but Earlspark had been sunk en route by a German U-boat, U-101 on 12 June. Paris had fallen the previous day, and Paulsen agreed that once his cargo was discharged, he would take on refugees and carry them to England.

About a hundred people took up his offer. Amongst those who boarded was the Earl of Suffolk, who had been the British Scientific Liaison Officer from the Department of Scientific and Industrial Research to the French government. With Major Ardale Vautier Golding (1902-1992) and their secretaries, Eileen Beryl Morden (Suffolk) and Marguerite Nicolle (Golding), they had left Paris on 10 June. They had escorted thirty-three eminent scientists and technicians, including Lew Kowarski and Hans Halban, along with their families, from Clermont Ferrand to Bordeaux, and arranged for their passage to England on Broompark.

The scientists brought with them 26 cans containing 185 kilograms (408 lb) of heavy water worth £22,000. Originally from Norway, it was a vital ingredient in nuclear energy research that would find use in the British Tube Alloys project. The managing director of the Antwerp Diamond Bank, Paul Timbal, joined them, bringing with him between £1 million and £3 million in diamonds. They also discovered 600 long tons (610 t) of machine tools in wagons on the quay, which were loaded on board. The diamonds and the heavy water were strapped to the deck on wooden pallets, so that if the ship was sunk they might float free, and possibly be recovered. On 19 June, Broompark weighed anchor and sailed down the Gironde estuary without the assistance of a pilot or tugboats, and made its way safely to Falmouth, arriving on 21 June.

== U-boat attack ==
On 21 September 1940, Broompark was travelling from Halifax to Glasgow in convoy HX 72, laden with 5,130 long tons (5,210 t) of lumber and metal. At 23:38 it was torpedoed by a German U-boat, U-48. One crewman was killed. Paulsen was in his bunk at the time. When he reached the bridge, he found that 40 of his 48 crewmen had abandoned ship. With his chief engineer and the seven other crewmen on board, he had ballast pumped into the leeward bilge to lift the ship onto an even keel, and Broompark continued the voyage under its own steam. It was bombed and strafed by a Focke-Wulf Fw 200 Condor off the coast of Scotland, but the Condor was driven off by anti-aircraft fire from Broompark and its escort. Broompark made port, and was repaired and restored to service. For his gallantry, Paulsen was made an Officer of the Order of the British Empire in January 1941. He was also awarded the Lloyd's War Medal for Bravery at Sea.

== Sinking ==
On 25 July 1942, Broompark, now under the command of Captain John Leask Sinclair was en route to New York with convoy ON 113. The ship was carrying ballast only. At 03:52, the convoy came under attack from U-552 under the command of Fregattenkapitän Erich Topp, which torpedoed the tanker British Merit. At 04:49, it torpedoed Broompark. Four members of the crew were killed, including Sinclair. The remaining 45, including the seven-man naval gun party, were picked up by the corvette HMCS Brandon and taken to St. John's. The ship was taken in tow by the fleet tug USS Cherokee, but sank at 06:00 on 28 July 1942.
