= Tube Alloys =

British nuclear weapons research during WW2

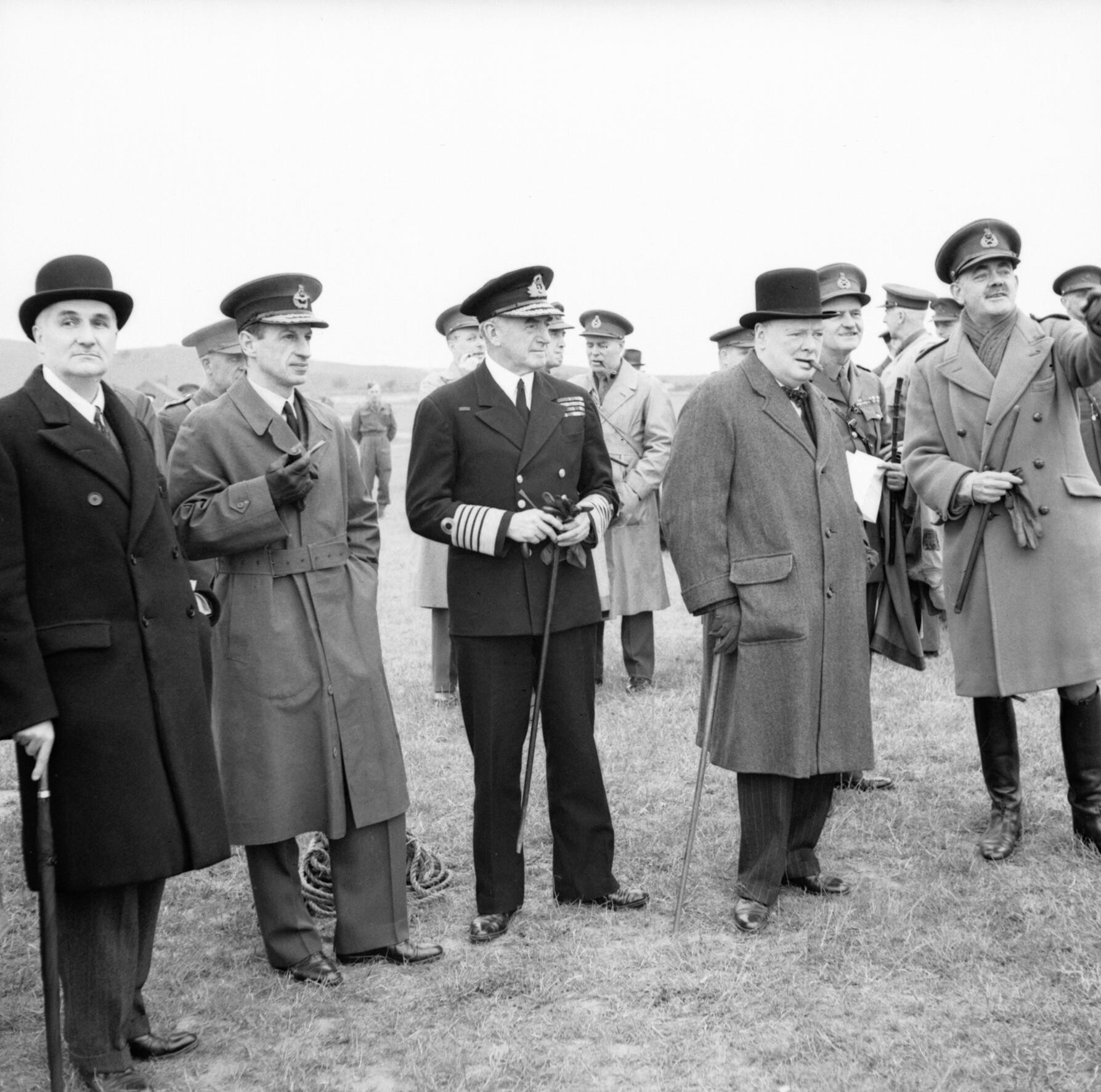
Lord Cherwell, scientific advisor to the prime minister, Air Chief Marshal Sir Charles Portal, Admiral of the Fleet Sir Dudley Pound, and Winston Churchill in June 1941.

Tube Alloys was a nuclear weapons research and development programme authorised by the United Kingdom, in August 1941, with the participation of Canada, during the Second World War. Starting before the Manhattan Project in the United States, the British efforts were kept classified, and as such had to be referred to by code even within the highest circles of government.

The possibility of nuclear weapons was acknowledged early in the war. At the University of Birmingham, Rudolf Peierls and Otto Robert Frisch co-wrote a memorandum explaining that a small mass of pure uranium-235 could be used to produce a chain reaction in a bomb with the power of thousands of tons of TNT. This led to the formation of the MAUD Committee, which called for an all-out effort to develop nuclear weapons. Wallace Akers, who oversaw the project, chose the deliberately misleading code name "Tube Alloys". His Tube Alloys Directorate was part of the Department of Scientific and Industrial Research.

The Tube Alloys programme in Britain and Canada was the first nuclear weapons project. Due to the high costs for Britain while fighting a war within bombing range of its enemies, Tube Alloys was ultimately subsumed into the Manhattan Project by the August 1943 Quebec Agreement with the United States. Under the agreement, the two nations would share nuclear weapons technology, and refrain from using it against each other, or against other countries without mutual consent. However, the United States did not provide complete details of the results of the Manhattan Project to the United Kingdom. The Soviet Union gained valuable information through its atomic spies, who had infiltrated both the British and American projects.

The United States terminated co-operation after the war ended, under the Atomic Energy Act of 1946. That prompted the United Kingdom to relaunch its own project, High Explosive Research. Production facilities were established and British scientists continued their work under the auspices of an independent British programme. In 1952, Britain performed a nuclear test under the codename "Operation Hurricane" and became the third nuclear-weapon state. In 1958, in the wake of the Sputnik crisis, and the British demonstration of a two-stage thermonuclear bomb, the United Kingdom and the United States signed the US–UK Mutual Defence Agreement, which resulted in a resumption of Britain's nuclear Special Relationship with the United States.

== Background ==
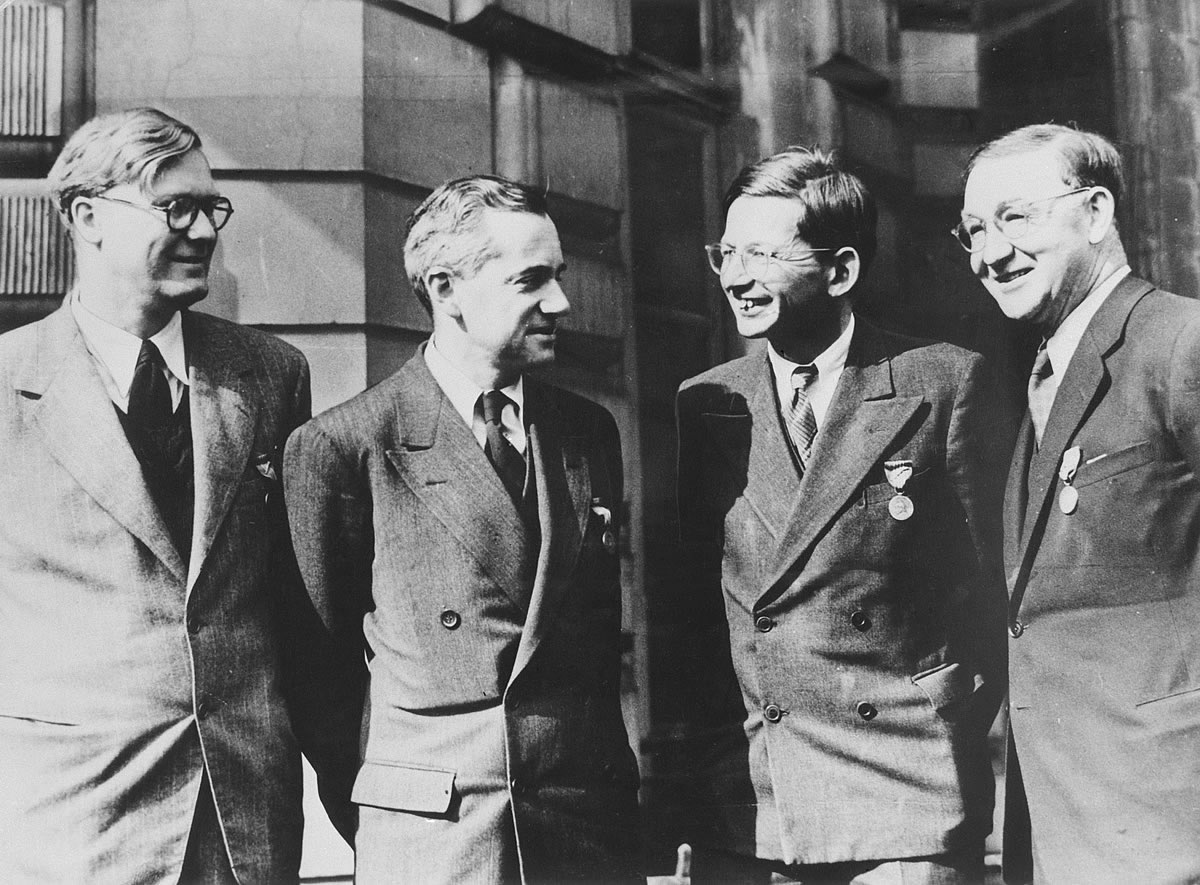
William Penney, Otto Frisch, Rudolf Peierls and John Cockcroft each received the Medal of Freedom in May 1947.

=== Discovery of fission ===
The neutron was discovered by James Chadwick at the Cavendish Laboratory at the University of Cambridge in February 1932. In April 1932, his Cavendish colleagues John Cockcroft and Ernest Walton split lithium atoms with accelerated protons. Enrico Fermi and his team in Rome conducted experiments involving the bombardment of elements by slow neutrons, which produced heavier elements and isotopes. Then, in December 1938, Otto Hahn and Fritz Strassmann at Hahn's laboratory in Berlin-Dahlem bombarded uranium with slowed neutrons, and discovered that barium had been produced, and therefore that the uranium atomic nucleus had been split. Hahn wrote to his colleague Lise Meitner, who, with her nephew Otto Robert Frisch, developed a theoretical justification which they published in Nature in 1939. The phenomenon was a new type of nuclear disintegration, and was more powerful than any seen before. Frisch and Meitner calculated that the energy released by each disintegration was approximately 200,000,000 electron volts. By analogy with the division of biological cells, they named the process "fission".

=== Paris Group ===
That was followed up by a group of scientists at the Collège de France in Paris: Frédéric Joliot-Curie, Hans von Halban, Lew Kowarski, and Francis Perrin. In February 1939, the Paris Group showed that when fission occurs in uranium, two or three extra neutrons are given off. That important observation suggested a self-sustaining nuclear chain reaction might be possible. The term "atomic bomb" was already familiar to the British public through the writings of H. G. Wells, in his 1913 novel The World Set Free. It was immediately apparent to many scientists that, in theory at least, an extremely powerful explosive could be created, although most still considered an atomic bomb was an impossibility. Perrin defined a critical mass of uranium to be the smallest amount that could sustain a chain reaction. The neutrons used to cause fission in uranium are considered slow neutrons, but when neutrons are released during a fission reaction they are released as fast neutrons which have much more speed and energy. Thus, in order to create a sustained chain reaction, there existed a need for a neutron moderator to contain and slow the fast neutrons until they reached a usable energy level. The Collège de France found that both water and graphite could be used as acceptable moderators.

Early in 1940, the Paris Group decided on theoretical grounds that heavy water would be an ideal moderator. They asked the French Minister of Armaments to obtain as much heavy water as possible from the only source, the large Norsk Hydro hydroelectric station at Vemork in Norway. The French discovered that Germany had already offered to purchase the entire stock of Norwegian heavy water, indicating that Germany might also be researching an atomic bomb. The French told the Norwegian government of the possible military significance of heavy water. Norway gave the entire stock of 187 litres (41 imp gal; 49 US gal) to a Deuxième Bureau agent, who secretly brought it to France just before Germany invaded Norway in April 1940. On 19 June 1940, following the German invasion of France, it was shipped to England by the Earl of Suffolk and Major Ardale Vautier Golding aboard the steamer Broompark. The heavy water, valued at £22,000, was initially kept at HM Prison Wormwood Scrubs, and was later secretly stored in the library at Windsor Castle. The Paris Group moved to Cambridge, with the exception of Joliot-Curie, who remained in France and became active in the French Resistance.

=== Frisch–Peierls memorandum ===
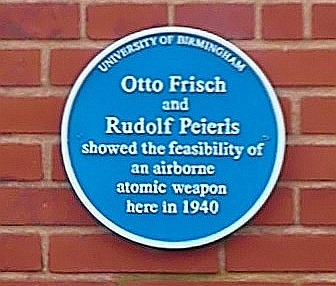
University of Birmingham, blue plaque commemorating the authors of the Frisch–Peierls memorandum at the Poynting Physics Building.

In Britain, a number of scientists considered whether an atomic bomb was practical. At the University of Liverpool, Chadwick and the Polish refugee scientist Joseph Rotblat tackled the problem, but their calculations were inconclusive. At Cambridge, Nobel Prize in Physics laureates George Paget Thomson and William Lawrence Bragg wanted the government to take urgent action to acquire uranium ore. The main source of this was the Belgian Congo, and they were worried that it could fall into German hands. Unsure as to how to go about this, they spoke to Sir William Spens, the master of Corpus Christi College, Cambridge. In April 1939, he approached Sir Kenneth Pickthorn, the local Member of Parliament, who took their concerns to the Secretary of the Committee of Imperial Defence, Major General Hastings Ismay. Ismay in turn asked Sir Henry Tizard for an opinion. Like many scientists, Tizard was sceptical of the likelihood of an atomic bomb being developed, reckoning the odds of success at 100,000 to 1.

Even at such long odds, the danger was sufficiently great to be taken seriously. Lord Chartfield, Minister for Coordination of Defence, checked with the Treasury and Foreign Office, and found that the Belgian Congo uranium was owned by the Union Minière du Haut Katanga company, whose British vice president, Lord Stonehaven, arranged a meeting with the president of the company, Edgar Sengier. Since Union Minière management were friendly towards Britain, it was not considered worthwhile to acquire the uranium immediately, but Tizard's Committee on the Scientific Survey of Air Defence was directed to continue the research into the feasibility of atomic bombs. Thomson, at Imperial College London, and Mark Oliphant, an Australian physicist at the University of Birmingham, were each tasked with carrying out a series of experiments on uranium. By February 1940, Thomson's team had failed to create a chain reaction in natural uranium, and he had decided it was not worth pursuing.

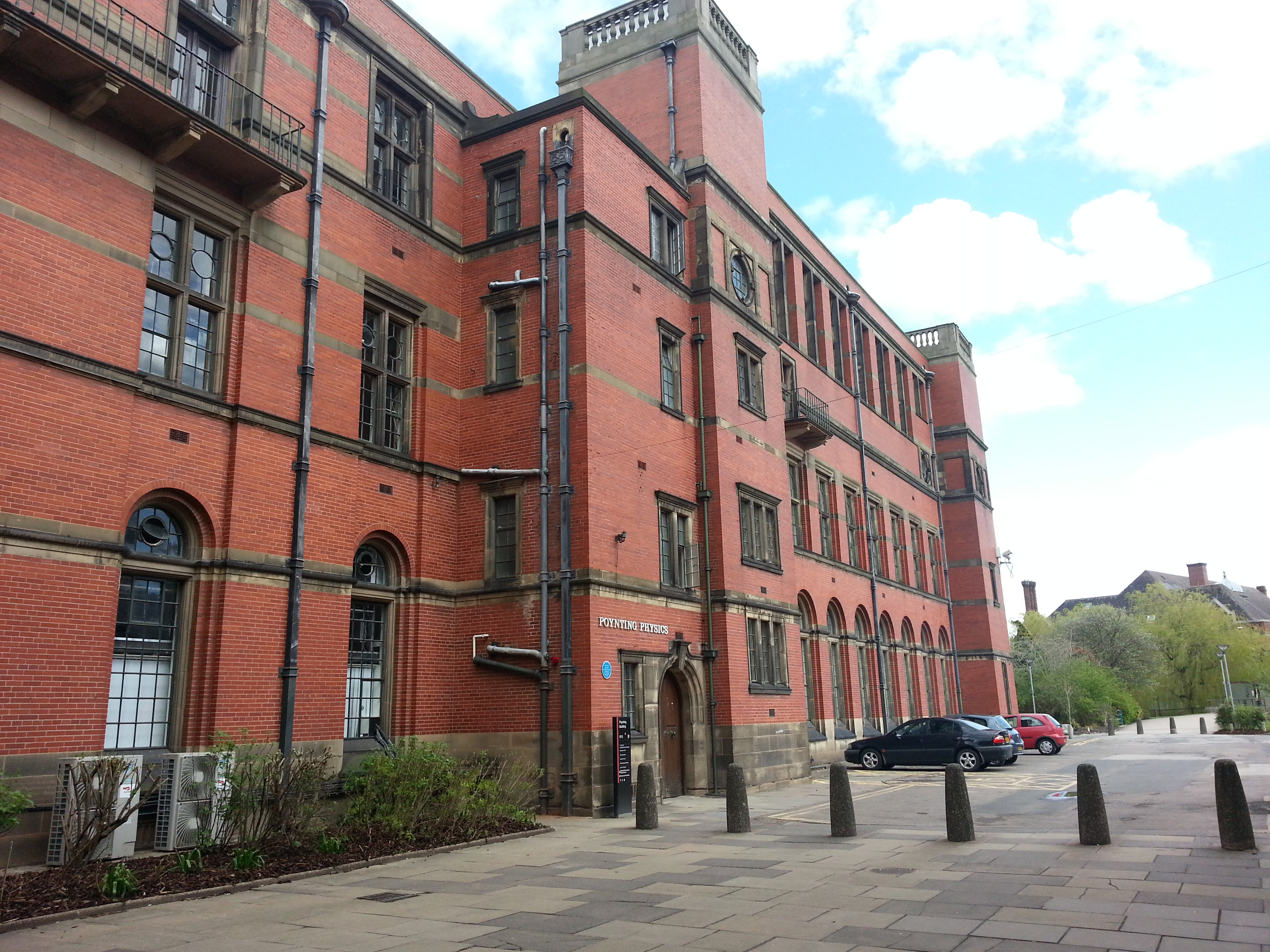
Poynting (physics) Building at the University of Birmingham.

At Birmingham, Oliphant's team had reached a different conclusion. Oliphant had delegated the task to two German refugee scientists, Rudolf Peierls and Otto Frisch, who could not work on Oliphant's radar project because they were enemy aliens and therefore lacked the necessary security clearance. Francis Perrin had calculated the critical mass of uranium to be about 40 tonnes (39 long tons; 44 short tons). He reckoned that if a neutron reflector were placed around it, this might be reduced to 12 tonnes (12 long tons; 13 short tons). Peierls attempted to simplify the problem by using the fast neutrons produced by fission, thus omitting consideration of moderator. He too calculated the critical mass of a sphere of uranium in a theoretical paper written in 1939 to be "of the order of tons".

Peierls knew the importance of the size of the critical mass that would allow a chain reaction to take place and its practical significance. In the interior of a critical mass sphere, neutrons are spontaneously produced by the fissionable material. A very small portion of these neutrons are colliding with other nuclei, while a larger portion of the neutrons are escaping through the surface of the sphere. Peierls calculated the equilibrium of the system, where the number of neutrons being produced equalled the number escaping.

Niels Bohr had theorised that the rare uranium-235 isotope, which makes up only about 0.7% of natural uranium, was primarily responsible for fission with fast neutrons, although this was not yet universally accepted. Frisch and Peierls were thus able to revise their initial estimate of critical mass needed for nuclear fission in uranium to be substantially less than previously assumed. They estimated a metallic sphere of uranium-235 with a radius of 2.1 centimetres (0.83 in) could suffice. This amount represented approximately 1 kilogram (2.2 lb) of uranium-235. These results led to the Frisch–Peierls memorandum, which was the initial step in the development of the nuclear arms programme in Britain. This marked the beginning of an aggressive approach towards uranium enrichment and the development of an atomic bomb. They now began to investigate processes by which they could successfully separate the uranium isotope.

Oliphant took their findings to Tizard in his capacity as the chairman of the Committee for the Scientific Survey of Air Warfare (CSSAW). He in turn passed them to Thomson, to whom the CSSAW had delegated responsibility for uranium research. After discussions between Cockcroft, Oliphant and Thomson, CSSAW created the MAUD Committee to investigate further.

=== MAUD Committee ===
The MAUD Committee was founded in June 1940. The committee was originally a part of the Committee for the Scientific Survey of Air Defence, but later gained independence with the Ministry of Aircraft Production. The committee was initially named after its chairman, Thomson, but quickly exchanged this for a more unassuming name, the MAUD Committee. The name MAUD came to be in an unusual way. Shortly after Germany invaded Denmark, Bohr had sent a telegram to Frisch. The telegram ended with a strange line: "Tell Cockcroft and Maud Ray Kent". At first it was thought to be code regarding radium or other vital atomic-weapons-related information, hidden in an anagram. One suggestion was to replace the y with an i, producing "radium taken". When Bohr returned to England in 1943, it was discovered that the message was addressed to Bohr's housekeeper Maud Ray and Cockcroft. Maud Ray was from Kent. Thus the committee was named The MAUD Committee, the capitalisation representing a codename and not an acronym. Meetings were normally held in the offices of the Royal Society in London. In addition to Thomson, its original members were Chadwick, Cockcroft, Oliphant and Philip Moon, Patrick Blackett, Charles Ellis and Norman Haworth.

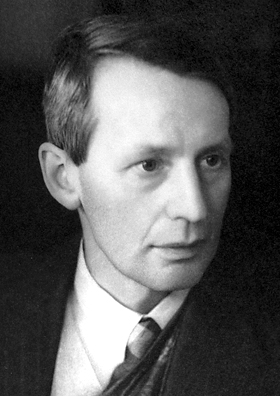
George Paget Thomson, chairman of the MAUD Committee, which initiated Tube Alloys.

Four universities provided the locations where the experiments were taking place. The laboratory at the University of Birmingham was responsible for all the theoretical work, such as what size of critical mass was needed for an explosion. It was run by Peierls, with the help of fellow German refugee scientist Klaus Fuchs. The laboratories at the University of Liverpool and the University of Oxford experimented with different types of isotope separation. Chadwick's group at Liverpool dealt with thermal diffusion, which worked based on the principle that different isotopes of uranium diffuse at different speeds because of the equipartition theorem. Franz Simon's group at Oxford investigated the gaseous diffusion of isotopes. This method works on the principle that at differing pressures uranium 235 would diffuse through a barrier faster than uranium 238. Eventually, the most promising method of separation was found to be gaseous diffusion. Egon Bretscher and Norman Feather's group at Cambridge investigated whether another element, now called plutonium, could be used as an explosive compound. Because of the French scientists, Oxford also obtained the world's only supply of heavy water, which helped them theorise how uranium could be used for power.

The research from the MAUD committee was compiled in two reports, commonly known as the MAUD reports in July 1941. The first report, "Use of Uranium for a Bomb", discussed the feasibility of creating a super-bomb from uranium, which they now thought to be possible. The second, "Use of Uranium as a Source of Power" discussed the idea of using uranium as a source of power, not just a bomb. The MAUD Committee and report helped bring about the British nuclear programme, the Tube Alloys Project. Not only did it help start a nuclear project in Britain, it helped jump-start the American project. Without the help of the MAUD Committee the American programme, the Manhattan Project, would have started months behind. Instead they were able to begin thinking about how to create a bomb, not whether it was possible. Historian Margaret Gowing noted that "events that change a time scale by only a few months can nevertheless change history."

The MAUD reports were reviewed by the Defence Services Panel of the Scientific Advisory Committee. This was chaired by Lord Hankey, with its other members being Sir Edward Appleton, Sir Henry Dale, Alfred Egerton, Archibald Hill and Edward Mellanby. The panel held seven meetings in September 1941, and submitted its report to the Lord President of the Council, Sir John Anderson. At this point, it was feared that German scientists were attempting to provide their country with an atomic bomb, and thus Britain needed to finish theirs first. The report ultimately stated that if there were even a sliver of a chance that the bomb effort could produce a weapon with such power, then every effort should be made to make sure Britain did not fall behind. It recommended that while a pilot separation plant be built in Britain, the production facility should be built in Canada. The Defence Services Panel submitted its report on 24 September 1941, but by this time the final decision had already been taken. Lord Cherwell had taken the matter to the Prime Minister, Winston Churchill, who became the first national leader to approve a nuclear weapons programme on 30 August 1941. The Chiefs of Staff Committee supported the decision.

== Tube Alloys programme ==
=== Organisation ===
A directorate of Tube Alloys was established as part of Appleton's Department of Scientific and Industrial Research, and Wallace Akers, the research director of Imperial Chemical Industries (ICI), was chosen as its head. Anderson and Akers came up with the name Tube Alloys. It was deliberately chosen to be meaningless, "with a specious air of probability about it". An advisory committee known as the Tube Alloys Consultative Council was created to oversee its work, chaired by Anderson, with its other members being Lord Hankey, Lord Cherwell, Sir Edward Appleton and Sir Henry Dale. This handled policy matters. To deal with technical issues, a Technical Committee was created with Akers as chairman, and Chadwick, Simon, Halban, Peierls, and a senior ICI official, Roland Edgar Slade, as its original members, with Michael Perrin as its secretary. It was later joined by Charles Galton Darwin, Cockcroft, Oliphant and Feather.

=== Isotopic separation ===
The biggest problem faced by the MAUD Committee was to find a way to separate the 0.7% of uranium-235 from the 99.3% of uranium-238. This is difficult because the two types of uranium are chemically identical. Separation (uranium enrichment) would have to be achieved at a large scale. At Cambridge, Eric Rideal and his team investigated using a gas centrifuge. Frisch chose to perform gaseous thermal diffusion using Clusius tubes because it seemed the simplest method. Frisch's calculations showed there would need to be 100,000 Clusius tubes to extract the desired separation amount. Peierls turned to Franz Simon, who preferred to find a method more suitable for mass production.

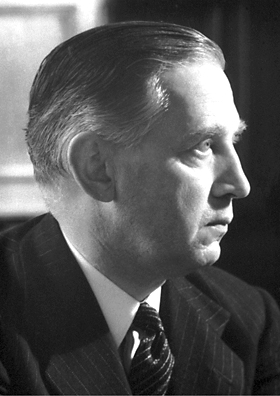
Sir Edward Appleton was permanent secretary of the Department of Scientific and Industrial Research, of which Tube Alloys was a part.

When Moon examined the suggestion that gaseous thermal diffusion be the method of choice to the MAUD committee, there was no agreement to move forward with it. The committee consulted with Peierls and Simon over the separation method and concluded that "ordinary" gaseous diffusion was the best method to pursue. This relies on Graham's law, the fact that the gases diffuse through porous materials at rates determined by their molecular weight. Francis William Aston applied this method in 1913 when he separated two isotopes of neon by diffusing a sample thousands of times through a pipe clay. Thick materials like pipe clay proved too slow to be efficient on an industry scale. Simon proposed using a metal foil punctured with millions of microscopic holes would allow the separation process to move faster. He estimated that a plant that separated 1 kilogram (2.2 lb) of uranium-235 from natural uranium per day would cost about £5,000,000 to build, and £1,500,000 per year to run, in which time it would consume £2,000,000 of uranium and other raw materials. The MAUD Committee realised an atomic bomb was not just feasible, but inevitable.

In 1941, Frisch moved to London to work with Chadwick and his cyclotron. Frisch built a Clusius tube there to study the properties of uranium hexafluoride. Frisch and Chadwick discovered it is one of the gases for which the Clusius method will not work. This was only a minor setback because Simon was already in progress of establishing the alternative method of separation through ordinary gaseous diffusion.

The chemical problems of producing gaseous compounds of uranium and pure uranium metal were studied at the University of Birmingham and by ICI. Michael Clapham, who at the time was working on print technology at the Kynoch Works in Aston in Birmingham, carried out early experiments with uranium production processes. Philip Baxter from ICI, where he had experience working with fluorine compounds, made the first small batch of gaseous uranium hexafluoride for Chadwick in 1940. ICI received a formal £5,000 contract in December 1940 to make 3 kilograms (6.6 lb) of this vital material for the future work. The prototype gaseous diffusion equipment itself was manufactured by Metropolitan-Vickers (MetroVick) at Trafford Park, Manchester, at a cost of £150,000 (equivalent to £7,260,024 in 2025) for four units. They were installed at the M. S. Factory located in a valley near Rhydymwyn, in Wales; M. S. stood for the Ministry of Supply. The building used was known as P6 and test equipment was installed. These units were tested by a team of about seventy under the guidance of Peierls and Fuchs. The results of the experiments led to the building of the gaseous diffusion factory at Capenhurst, Cheshire. ICI pilot plants for producing 1 long hundredweight (51 kg) of pure uranium metal and 50 to 100 kilograms (110 to 220 lb) of uranium hexafluoride per day commenced operation in Widnes in mid-1943.

=== Plutonium ===
The breakthrough with plutonium was by Bretscher and Norman Feather at the Cavendish Laboratory. They realised that a slow neutron reactor fuelled with uranium would theoretically produce substantial amounts of plutonium-239 as a by-product. This is because uranium-238 absorbs slow neutrons and forms a short-lived new isotope, uranium-239. The new isotope's nucleus rapidly emits an electron through beta decay producing a new element with an atomic mass of 239 and an atomic number of 93. This element's nucleus also emits an electron and becomes a new element with an atomic number 94 and a much greater half-life. Bretscher and Feather showed theoretically feasible grounds that element 94 would be fissile – readily split by both slow and fast neutrons with the added advantage of being chemically different from uranium.

This new development was also confirmed in independent work by Edwin M. McMillan and Philip Abelson at Berkeley Radiation Laboratory also in 1940. Nicholas Kemmer of the Cambridge team proposed the names neptunium for the new element 93 and plutonium for 94 by analogy with the outer planets Neptune and Pluto beyond Uranus (uranium being element 92). The Americans fortuitously suggested the same names. The production and identification of the first sample of plutonium in 1941 is generally credited to Glenn Seaborg, using a cyclotron rather than a reactor at the University of California. In 1941, neither team knew of the existence of the other.

Chadwick voiced concerns about the need for such pure plutonium to make a feasible bomb. He also suspected the gun method of detonation for a plutonium bomb would lead to premature detonations due to impurities. After Chadwick met Robert Oppenheimer at the Los Alamos Laboratory in 1943, he learned of a proposed bomb design which they were calling an implosion. The sub-critical mass of plutonium was supposed to be surrounded by explosives arranged to detonate simultaneously. This would cause the plutonium core to be compressed and become supercritical. The core would be surrounded by a depleted uranium tamper which would reflect the neutrons back into the reaction, and contribute to the explosion by fissioning itself. This design solved Chadwick's worries about purity because it did not require the level needed for the gun-type fission weapon. The biggest problem with this method was creating the explosive lenses. Chadwick took this information with him and described the method to Oliphant who then took it with him to England.

=== Montreal Laboratory ===
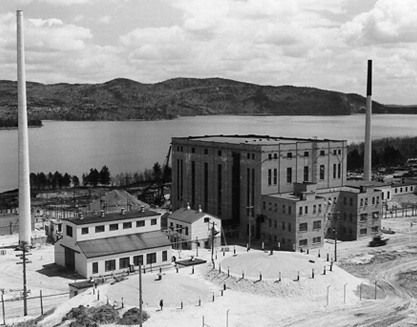
NRX and ZEEP buildings at the Chalk River Laboratories

Halban's heavy water team from France continued its slow neutron research at Cambridge University; but the project was given a low priority since it was not considered relevant to bomb making. It suddenly acquired military significance when it was realised that it provided the route to plutonium. The British Government wanted the Cambridge team to be relocated to North America, in proximity to the raw materials it required, and where the American research was being done. But Sir John Anderson wanted the British team to retain its own identity, and was concerned that since the Americans were working on nuclear reactor designs using nuclear graphite instead of heavy water as a neutron moderator, that team might not receive a fair share of resources. The Americans had their own concerns, particularly about security, since only one of the six senior scientists in the group was British. They also had concerns about patent rights; that the French team would attempt to patent nuclear technology based on the pre-war work. As a compromise, Thomson suggested relocating the team to Canada.

The Canadian government was approached, and Jack Mackenzie, the president of the National Research Council of Canada, immediately welcomed and supported the proposal. The costs and salaries would be divided between the British and Canadian governments, but the British share would come from a billion dollar war gift from Canada. The first eight staff arrived in Montreal at the end of 1942, and occupied a house belonging to McGill University. Three months later they moved into a 200 square metres (2,200 sq ft) area in a new building at the University of Montreal. The laboratory grew quickly to over 300 staff; about half were Canadians recruited by George Laurence. A subgroup of theoreticians was recruited and headed by a Czechoslovak physicist, George Placzek. Placzek proved to be a very capable group leader, and was generally regarded as the only member of the staff with the stature of the highest scientific rank and with close personal contacts with many key physicists involved in the Manhattan project. Friedrich Paneth became head of the chemistry division, and Pierre Auger of the experimental physics division. Von Halban was the director of the laboratory, but he proved to be an unfortunate choice as he was a poor administrator, and did not work well with the National Research Council of Canada. The Americans saw him as a security risk, and objected to the French atomic patents claimed by the Paris Group (in association with ICI).

=== Niels Bohr's contribution ===
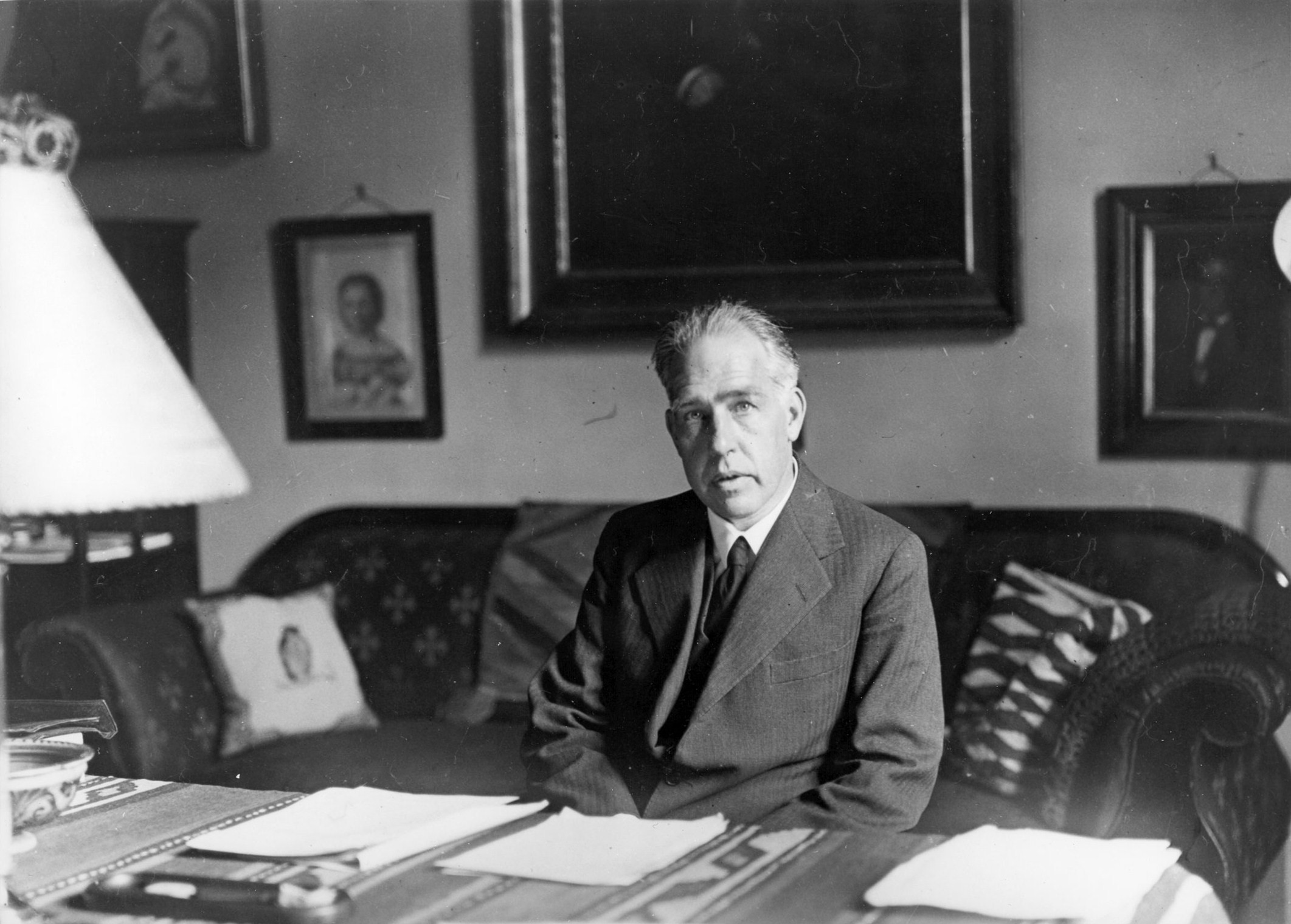
Niels Bohr in 1935.

Sir John Anderson was eager to invite Niels Bohr to the Tube Alloys project because he was a world-famous scientist who would not only contribute his expertise to the project, but also help the British government gain leverage in dealings with the Manhattan Project. In September 1943, word reached Bohr in Denmark that the Nazis considered his family to be Jewish, and that they were in danger of being arrested. The Danish resistance helped Bohr and his wife escape by sea to Sweden on 29 September 1943. When the news of Bohr's escape reached Britain, Lord Cherwell sent a telegram asking Bohr to come to Britain. Bohr arrived in Scotland on 6 October in a de Havilland Mosquito operated by the British Overseas Airways Corporation (BOAC).

At the invitation of the director of the Manhattan Project, Brigadier General Leslie R. Groves Jr., Bohr visited the Manhattan Project sites in November 1943. Groves offered Bohr substantial pay, but Bohr initially refused the offer because he wanted to make sure the relationship between the United States and Great Britain remained a real co-operative partnership. In December 1943, after a meeting with Albert Einstein, Bohr and his son Aage committed to working on the Manhattan Project. Bohr made a substantial contribution to the atomic bomb development effort. He also attempted to prevent a post-war atomic arms race with the Soviet Union, which he believed to be a serious threat. In 1944, Bohr presented several key points he believed to be essential concerning international nuclear weapon control. He urged that Britain and the United States should inform the Soviet Union about the Manhattan Project in order to decrease the likelihood of its feeling threatened on the premise that the other nations were building a bomb behind its back. His beliefs stemmed from his conviction that the Russians already knew about the Manhattan Project, leading him to believe there was no point in hiding it from them.

Bohr's evidence came from an interpretation of a letter he received from a Soviet friend and scientist in Russia, which he showed to the British security services. He reasoned that the longer the United States and Britain hid their nuclear advances, the more threatened the Russians would feel and the more inclined to speed up their effort to produce an atomic bomb of their own. With the help of U.S. Supreme Court justice Felix Frankfurter, Bohr met on 26 August 1944 with the President of the United States, Franklin D. Roosevelt, who was initially sympathetic to his ideas about controlling nuclear weapons. But Churchill was adamantly opposed to informing the Soviet Union of such work. At the Second Quebec Conference in September 1944, Roosevelt sided with Churchill, deciding it would be in the nation's best interest to keep the atomic bomb project a secret. Moreover, they decided Bohr was potentially dangerous and that security measures must be taken in order to prevent him from leaking information to the rest of the world, Russia in particular.

== Tube Alloys in the United States ==
=== Tizard mission ===
In August 1940, a British mission, led by Tizard and with members including Cockcroft, was sent to America to create relations and help advance the research towards war technology with the Americans. Several military technologies were shared, including advances in radar, anti-submarine warfare, aeronautical engineering and explosives. The American radar programme in particular was reinvigorated with an added impetus to the development of microwave radar and proximity fuzes. This prompted the Americans to create the MIT Radiation Laboratory, which would later serve as a model for the Los Alamos Laboratory. The mission did not spend much time on nuclear fission, with only two meetings of the subject, mainly about uranium enrichment. In particular, Cockcroft did not report Peierls' and Frisch's findings. Nonetheless, there were important repercussions. A barrier had been broken and a pathway to exchange technical information between the two countries was developed. Moreover, the notion of civilian scientists playing an important role in the development of military technologies was strengthened on both sides of the Atlantic.

=== Oliphant's visit to the United States ===
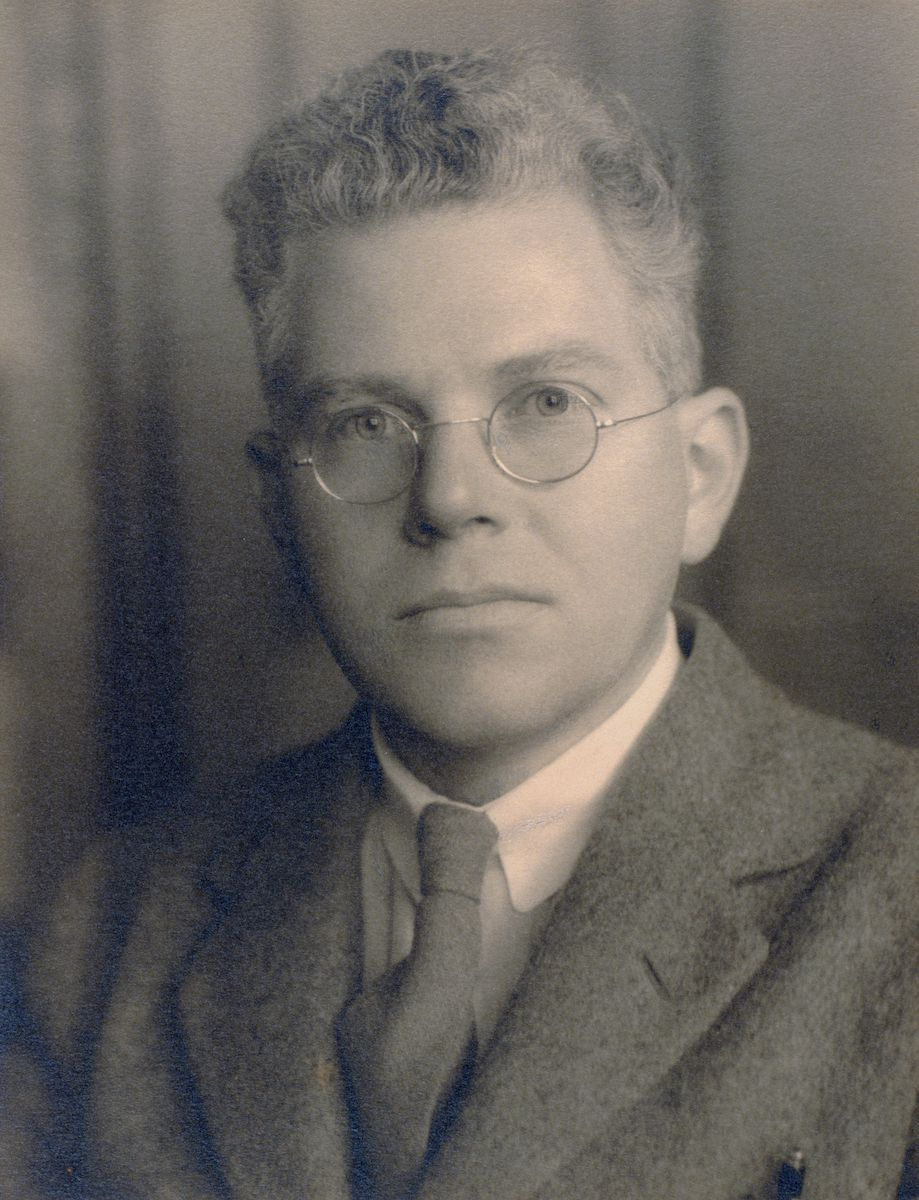
Australian physicist Mark Oliphant played a key role in starting both the British and the American atomic bomb projects.

The MAUD Committee reports urged the co-operation with the United States should be continued in the research of nuclear fission. Charles C. Lauritsen, a Caltech physicist working at the National Defense Research Committee (NDRC), was in London during this time and was invited to sit in on a MAUD meeting. The committee pushed for rapid development of nuclear weapons using gaseous-diffusion as their isotope separation device. Once he returned to the United States, he was able to brief Vannevar Bush, the director of the Office of Scientific Research and Development (OSRD), concerning the details discussed during the meeting.

In August 1941, Mark Oliphant, the director of the physics department at the University of Birmingham and an original member of the MAUD Committee, was sent to the US to assist the NDRC on radar. During his visit he met with William D. Coolidge. Coolidge was shocked when Oliphant told him the British had predicted that only ten kilograms of uranium-235 would be sufficient to supply a chain reaction effected by fast moving neutrons. While in America, Oliphant discovered that the chairman of the OSRD S-1 Section, Lyman Briggs, had locked away the MAUD reports transferred from Britain entailing the initial discoveries and had not informed the S-1 Committee members of all its findings.

Oliphant took the initiative himself to enlighten the scientific community in the U.S. of the recent groundbreaking discoveries the MAUD Committee had just exposed. Oliphant also travelled to Berkeley to meet with Ernest Lawrence, inventor of the cyclotron. After Oliphant informed Lawrence of his report on uranium, Lawrence met with NDRC chairman James Bryant Conant, George B. Pegram, and Arthur Compton to relay the details which Oliphant had directed to Lawrence. Oliphant was not only able to get in touch with Lawrence, he met with Conant and Bush to inform them of the significant data the MAUD had discovered. Oliphant's ability to inform the Americans led to Oliphant convincing Lawrence, Lawrence convincing Compton, and then George Kistiakowsky convincing Conant to move forward with nuclear weapons. These actions from Oliphant resulted in Bush taking this report directly to the president.

=== Information sharing ceases ===
The American effort increased rapidly and soon outstripped the British as the American authorities were reluctant to share details with their British counterparts. However, separate research continued in each country with some exchange of information. Several of the key British scientists visited the United States early in 1942 and were given full access to all of the information available. They were astounded at the momentum the American atomic bomb project had then assumed. The British and American exchange of information and efforts continued but the nations did not combine their efforts, leading their programmes separately. Furthermore, in 1941 the British Government rebuffed and vetoed attempts and proposals by Bush and Conant to strengthen cooperation between the United Kingdom and America.

In June 1942, the United States Army Corps of Engineers took over the Manhattan Project from OSRD, and Groves became the project's director. He tightened security, which dried up the flow of information to Britain. American officials were particularly concerned that Akers and other people from ICI involved in the Tube Alloys project were trying to exploit American nuclear scientific knowledge to create a profitable post-war industry. In October 1942, Bush and Conant convinced Roosevelt the United States should independently develop the atomic bomb project, despite an agreement of unrestricted scientific interchange between the US and Britain.

This disastrously affected British efforts as they lacked manpower, facilities, equipment and materials. Tube Alloys, therefore, fell behind in the race with the Manhattan Project. On 30 July 1942, Anderson advised Churchill: "We must face the fact that ... [our] pioneering work ... is a dwindling asset and that, unless we capitalise it quickly, we shall be outstripped. We now have a real contribution to make to a 'merger'. Soon we shall have little or none." By the time Britain realised it, the position had worsened; Bush decided outside help for the Manhattan Project was no longer needed. The Military Policy Committee (MPC) supported Bush's arguments and restricted access to the classified information which Britain could utilise to develop its atomic weapons programme, even if it slowed down the American efforts.

The Americans stopped sharing any information on heavy water production, the method of electromagnetic separation, the physical or chemical properties of plutonium, the details of bomb design, or the facts about fast neutron reactions. This was a major disappointment that hindered the British and the Canadians, who were collaborating on heavy water production and several other aspects of the research programme. By 1943 Britain had stopped sending its scientists to the United States, which slowed down the pace of work there, which had relied on efforts led by British scientists. In March 1943 Conant approached the Military Policy Committee, which decided that Britain's help would benefit some areas of the project. Chadwick, William Penney, Peierls, Oliphant and other British scientists were important enough that the bomb design team at the Los Alamos Laboratory needed them, despite the risk of revealing weapon design secrets.

=== Quebec Agreement ===
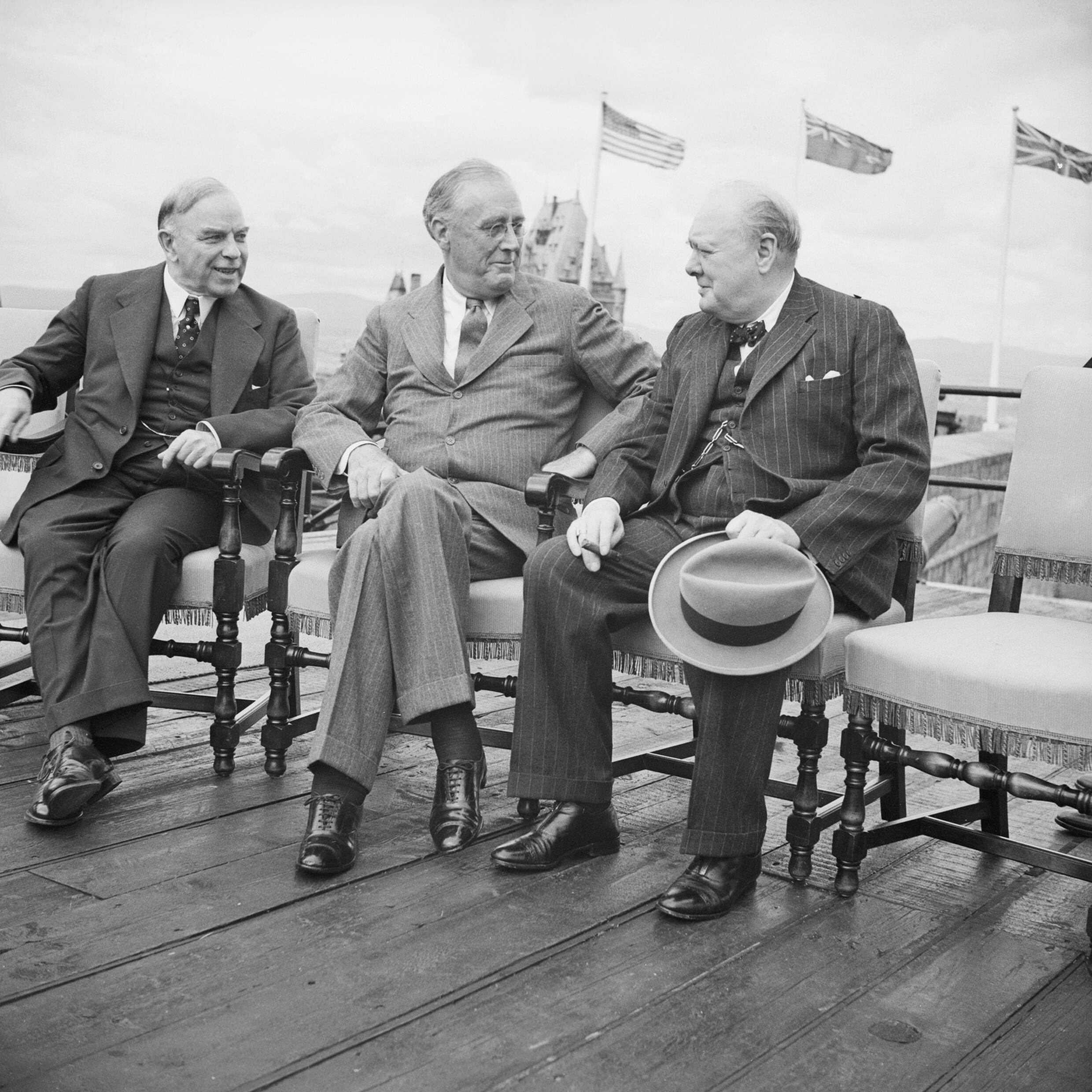
William Mackenzie King, Franklin D. Roosevelt and Winston Churchill at the Quebec Conference in August 1943.

Churchill sought information about building Britain's own gaseous diffusion plant, a heavy water plant and an atomic reactor in Britain, despite the immense cost. A gaseous diffusion plant to produce a kilogram of weapons-grade uranium per day was estimated to cost up to £3 million in research and development, and anything up to £50 million to build in wartime Britain. A nuclear reactor to produce that much plutonium per day would have to be built in Canada. It would take up to five years to build and cost £5 million. The project would also require facilities for producing the required heavy water (between £5 million and £10 million) and uranium metal (£1.5 million). The project would need overwhelming priority, as it was estimated to require twenty thousand workers – many of them highly skilled – half a million tons of steel, and an unprecedented half gigawatt of electricity. Disruption to other wartime projects would be inevitable, and it was unlikely to be ready in time to affect the outcome of the war in Europe. The unanimous response was that first another effort should be made to secure American co-operation.

In July 1943, in London, American officials cleared up some major misunderstandings about British motives, and after many months of negotiations the Quebec Agreement was signed by Churchill and Roosevelt on 19 August 1943 during the Quebec Conference. The British handed over their material to the Americans and in return received the copies of the American progress reports to the President. Tube Alloys was subsumed into the Manhattan Project. In a section of the Quebec Agreement formally entitled "Articles of Agreement governing collaboration between the authorities of the US and UK in the matter of Tube Alloys", Britain and the US agreed to share resources "to bring the Tube Alloys project to fruition at the earliest moment". The leaders further agreed that:

- "First, we will never use this agency against each other,
- Secondly, we will not use it against third parties without each other's consent, and
- Thirdly, we will not either of us communicate any information about Tube Alloys to third parties except by mutual consent."

It was also agreed that "any post-war advantages of an industrial or commercial nature" would be decided at the discretion of the President. The Quebec Agreement established the Combined Policy Committee to control the Manhattan Project, consisting of Henry Stimson, Bush and Conant from the United States; Field Marshal Sir John Dill and Colonel J. J. Llewellin were the British members, and C. D. Howe was the Canadian member. Llewellin returned to the United Kingdom at the end of 1943 and was replaced on the committee by Sir Ronald Ian Campbell, who in turn was replaced by the British Ambassador to the United States, Lord Halifax, in early 1945. Dill died in Washington, D.C., in November 1944 and was replaced both as Chief of the British Joint Staff Mission and as a member of the Combined Policy Committee by Field Marshal Sir Henry Maitland Wilson. The subsequent Hyde Park Agreement on 19 September 1944 extended this cooperation to the post-war period.

=== British contribution to the Manhattan Project ===
Akers summoned Chadwick, Oliphant, Simon and Peierls to the United States. They arrived the day the Quebec Agreement was signed, ready to assist the Manhattan Project in any way possible. Akers was generally disliked and the Americans refused to move forward with collaboration unless a top British scientist who was "accepted and sound of judgement" was appointed instead. British officials dug in over Britain's right to make its own appointments to its own government agencies. A compromise was reached, with Chadwick put in charge as Britain's technical advisor for the Combined Policy Committee, and as the head of the British Mission to the Manhattan Project.

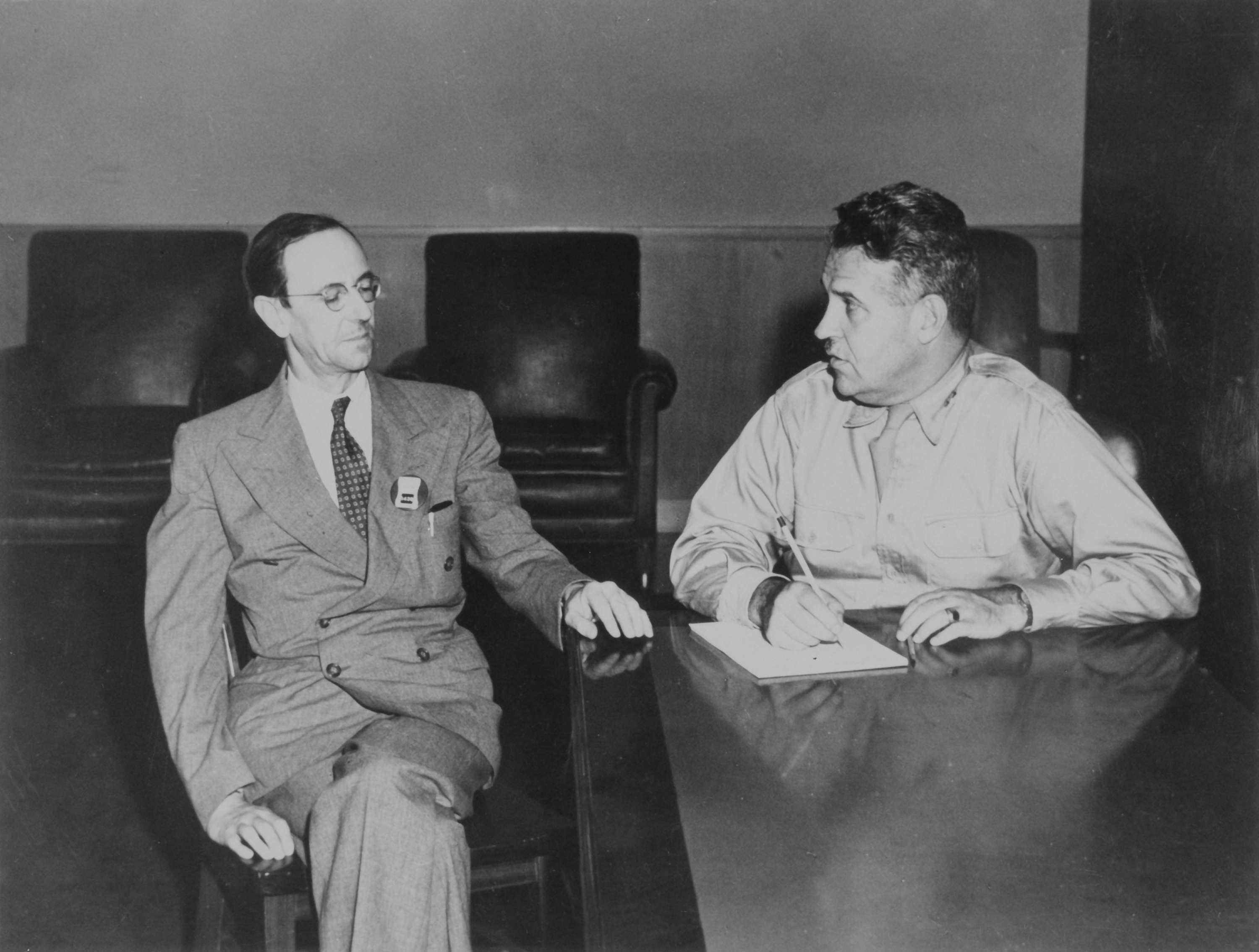
James Chadwick, head of the British Mission to the Manhattan Project, with Major General Leslie R. Groves Jr., the project's director.

With this dispute settled collaboration could once again take place. Chadwick wanted to involve as many British scientists as possible so long as Groves accepted them. Chadwick's first choice, Joseph Rotblat refused to give up his Polish citizenship. Chadwick then turned to Otto Frisch, who to Chadwick's surprise accepted becoming a British citizen right away and began the screening process so he could travel to America. Chadwick spent the first few weeks of November 1943 acquiring a clear picture of the extensive Manhattan Project. He realised the scale of such sites as Oak Ridge, Tennessee, which was the new headquarters of the project, and could safely conclude that without similar industrial site being found in Germany the chances of the Nazi atomic bomb project being successful was very low.

With Chadwick involved the main goal was to show that the Quebec Agreement was a success. It was Britain's duty to co-operate to the fullest and speed along the process. Chadwick used this opportunity to give as many young British scientists experience as possible so they might carry that experience to post-war Britain. He eventually convinced Groves of Rotblat's integrity to the cause, and this led to Rotblat being accepted to the Manhattan Project without renouncing his nationality. Rotblat had been left in charge of the Tube Alloys research, and brought with him the results obtained since Chadwick had left.

The Montreal team in Canada depended on the Americans for heavy water from the US heavy water plant in Trail, British Columbia, which was under American contract, and for technical information about plutonium. The Americans said they would supply heavy water to the Montreal group only if it agreed to direct its research along the limited lines suggested by DuPont, its main contractor for reactor construction. Despite doing much good work, by June 1943 the Montreal Laboratory had come to a complete standstill. Morale was low and the Canadian Government proposed cancelling the project. In April 1944, a Combined Policy Committee meeting in Washington agreed Canada would build a heavy water reactor. The Americans agreed to support the project with information and visits, and to supply materials, including vital uranium and heavy water. The Montreal Laboratory would be given access to data from the Metallurgical Laboratory's research reactors at Argonne and the X-10 Graphite Reactor at Oak Ridge, but not from the production reactors at the Hanford Site; nor was it to be given any information about the chemistry of plutonium, or methods for separating it from other elements. This arrangement was formally approved by the Combined Policy Committee meeting on 19 September 1944. John Cockcroft became the director of the Montreal Laboratory. The Chalk River Laboratories opened in 1944, and in 1946 the Montreal Laboratory was closed. The project developed the ZEEP reactor, which went critical in September 1945.

William Penney, one of the Tube Alloys scientists, was an expert in shock waves. In June 1944, he went to America to work at the Los Alamos Laboratory as part of the British delegation. He worked on the means to assess the effects of a nuclear explosion, and wrote a paper on what height the bombs should be detonated at for maximum effect in attacks on Germany and Japan. He served as a member of the target committee established by Groves to select Japanese cities for atomic bombing, and on Tinian with Project Alberta as a special consultant. Along with Group Captain Leonard Cheshire, sent as a British representative, he watched the bombing of Nagasaki from the observation plane Big Stink. He also formed part of the Manhattan Project's post-war scientific mission to Hiroshima and Nagasaki that assessed the extent of the damage caused by the bombs.

The Smyth Report was issued by the US War Department on 12 August 1945, giving the story of the atomic bomb and including the technical details that could now be made public. It made few references to the British contribution to the bomb, and a White Paper, Statements Relating to the Atomic Bomb, was hurriedly drafted by Michael Perrin. This account was issued just after Clement Attlee had replaced Churchill as Prime Minister, and was the only official statement on the British contribution for fifteen years.

== Aftermath ==
=== Soviet spies in the Tube Alloys project ===
The Soviet Union received details of British research from its atomic spies Klaus Fuchs, Engelbert Broda, Melita Norwood and John Cairncross, a member of the notorious Cambridge Five. Alan Nunn May was recruited later in Canada. Lavrenty Beria's report to Stalin of March 1942 included the MAUD reports and other British documents passed by Cairncross.

Fuchs began disclosing information to the Soviet Union about the possible production of a British atomic bomb when he joined the Tube Alloys project, although his contribution towards Soviet espionage was more severe during the Manhattan Project. Fuchs was able to contact a London-based KPD leader, Jürgen Kuczynski, who put him in contact with Simon Davidovitch Kremer, the secretary to the military attaché at the Soviet Union's embassy, who in turn worked for the GRU (Russian: Главное Разведывательное Управление), the Red Army's foreign military intelligence directorate. After three meetings, Fuchs was teamed up with a courier so he would not have to find excuses to travel to London. She was Ursula Kuczynski, the sister of Jurgen Kuczynski. She was also a German communist, a major in Soviet Military Intelligence and an experienced agent who had worked with Richard Sorge's spy ring in the Far East.

=== Post-war ===
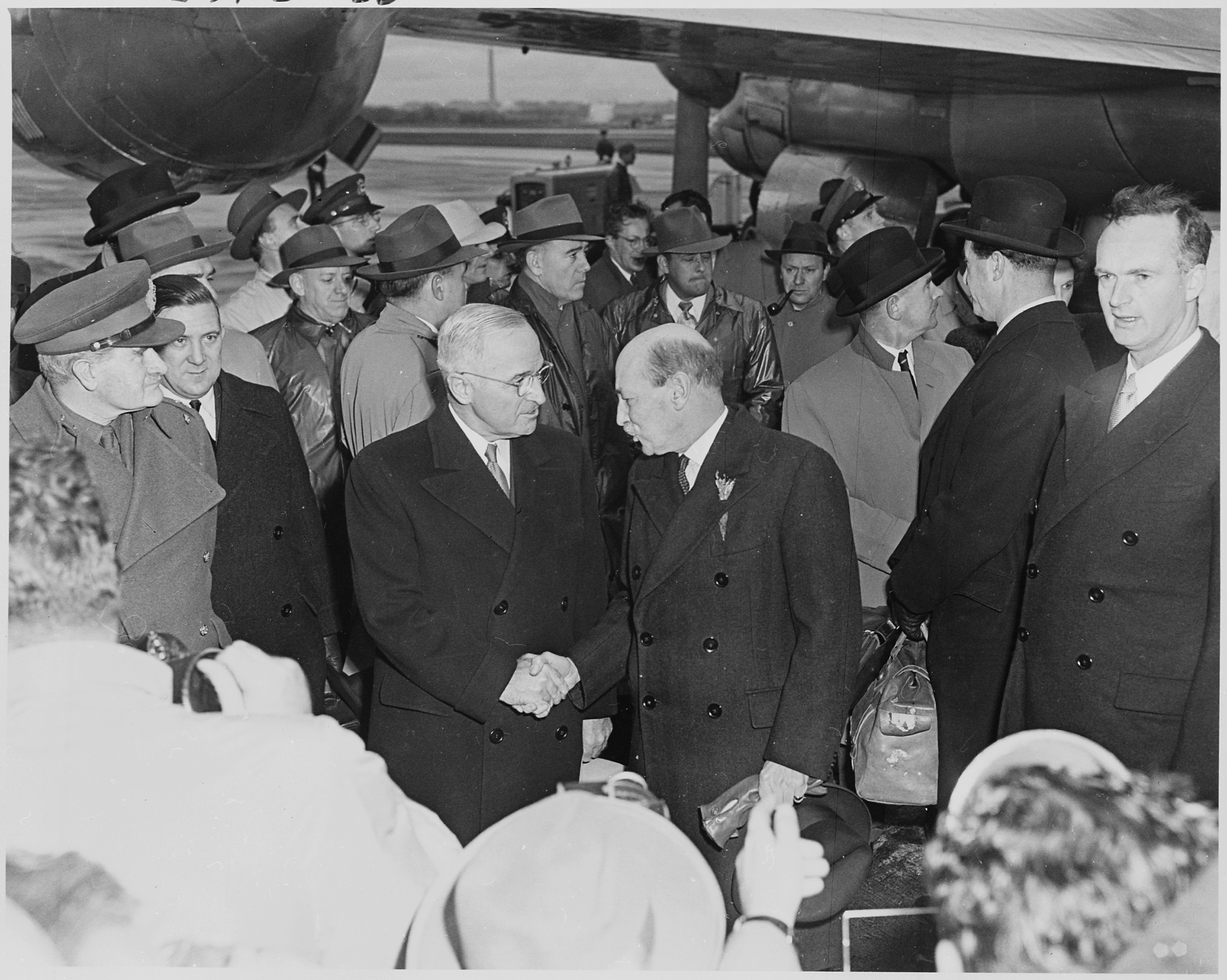
President Harry S. Truman (foreground, left) greets Prime Minister Clement Attlee (foreground, right) at Washington National Airport, upon Attlee's arrival for talks on the Korean crisis in December 1950.

With the end of the war the Special Relationship between Britain and the United States "became very much less special". Roosevelt died on 12 April 1945, and the Hyde Park Agreement was not binding on subsequent administrations. In fact, it was physically lost: when Wilson raised the matter in a Combined Policy Committee meeting in June, the American copy could not be found. The British sent Stimson a photocopy on 18 July 1945. Even then, Groves questioned the document's authenticity until the American copy was located years later in the papers of Vice Admiral Wilson Brown Jr., Roosevelt's naval aide, apparently misfiled by someone unaware of what Tube Alloys was—who thought it had something to do with naval guns.

The British government had trusted that America would share nuclear technology, which the British saw as a joint discovery. On 9 November 1945, Mackenzie King and the Prime Minister, Clement Attlee, went to Washington, D.C., to confer with President Harry Truman about future cooperation in nuclear weapons and nuclear power. The three leaders agreed there would be full and effective cooperation on atomic energy, but British hopes for a full resumption of cooperation on nuclear weapons were disappointed. The Americans soon made it clear that this was restricted to basic scientific research.

The passage of the Atomic Energy Act of 1946 (McMahon Act) in August 1946 made it clear that the UK would no longer be allowed access to the United States' atomic research. This partly resulted from the arrest for espionage of Alan Nunn May in February 1946. On 8 January 1947, Attlee formed a secret Gen 163 Cabinet committee, consisting of six cabinet ministers, which decided that Britain required the atomic bomb to maintain its position in world politics. In the words of the Foreign Secretary Ernest Bevin, "That won't do at all ... we've got to have this ... I don't mind for myself, but I don't want any other Foreign Secretary of this country to be talked to or at by a Secretary of State in the United States as I have just had in my discussions with Mr Byrnes. We've got to have this thing over here whatever it costs ... We've got to have the bloody Union Jack on top of it."

Marshal of the Royal Air Force Lord Portal, was appointed to lead the effort, code-named High Explosive Research. The Atomic Energy Research Establishment (AERE) near Harwell, Oxfordshire, was created by Cockcroft in 1946 as the main centre for military and civilian atomic energy research and development. Penney led the bomb design effort as Chief Superintendent Armament Research (CSAR, pronounced "Caesar"), in charge of the Ministry Of Supply's Armaments Research Department (ARD) at Fort Halstead in Kent and the Royal Arsenal at Woolwich. In April 1950 an abandoned Second World War airfield, RAF Aldermaston in Berkshire, was selected as the permanent home for what became the Atomic Weapons Research Establishment (AWRE). Penney assembled a team to initiate the work, firstly preparing a report describing the features, science and idea behind the American Fat Man implosion-type nuclear weapon. He broke down the development tasks required to replicate it, identifying outstanding questions that required further research on nuclear weapons.

On 3 October 1952, under the code-name "Operation Hurricane", the first British nuclear device was successfully detonated in the Monte Bello Islands off the west coast of Australia. The Sputnik crisis and the development of the British hydrogen bomb led to the Atomic Energy Act being amended in 1958, and to a resumption of the nuclear Special Relationship between America and Britain under the 1958 US–UK Mutual Defence Agreement.
