= Bernice Weldon Sargent =

Canadian physicist (1906–1993)

- Born: 24 September 1906; Williamsburg, Ontario
- Died: 17 December 1993 (aged 87); Kingston, Ontario
- Education: Queen's University (B.A. (Hons), 1926, M.A. 1927); University of Cambridge (Ph.D., 1932)
- Known for: Sargent curves
- Scientific career
- Workplaces: Queen's University; Montreal Laboratory
- Thesis: The Disintegration Electrons (1932)
- Doctoral advisor: Ernest Rutherford and Charles Drummond Ellis

Bernice Weldon Sargent, MBE, FRSC (24 September 1906 – 17 December 1993) was a Canadian physicist who worked at the Manhattan Project's Montreal Laboratory during the Second World War as head of its nuclear physics division. In his 1932 doctoral thesis, he discovered the relationship between the radioactive disintegration constants of beta particle-emitting radioisotopes and corresponding logarithms of their maximum beta particle energies. These plots are known as "Sargent curves".

== Biography ==
Bernice Weldon Sargent was born in Williamsburg, Ontario, on 24 September 1906, the son of Henry Sargent, a farmer, and his wife Ella née Dillabough. He attended Chesterville High School and Morrisburg Collegiate Institute. He was awarded a Prince of Wales Entrance Scholarship and a Carter Scholarship, and entered Queen's University, where he earned a Bachelor of Arts degree with honours in mathematics and physics in 1926, and a Master of Arts degree the following year.

In 1928, Sargent was awarded an 1851 Research Fellowship, which allowed him to travel to England to study at the Cavendish Laboratory at the University of Cambridge under Ernest Rutherford. His 1932 doctoral thesis, written under the supervision of Rutherford and Charles Drummond Ellis, on "The Disintegration Electrons", subsequently published in the Proceedings of the Royal Society, described relationship between the radioactive disintegration constants of beta particle-emitting radioisotopes and corresponding logarithms of their maximum beta particle energies. These plots are today known as "Sargent curves" or "Sargent diagrams". This was used by Enrico Fermi in developing his theory of beta decay.

Sargent returned to Canada, where he became a lecturer and then an assistant professor at Queen's University. In 1941, he joined George Laurence of the National Research Council (NRC) in Ottawa to investigate nuclear energy, writing a report on "Uranium Fission in a Bulk of Carbon and Uranium Oxide". In 1943, he took a leave of absence from Queen's University to join the Anglo-Canadian Montreal Laboratory, which subsequently became part of the Manhattan Project. He became the head of its nuclear physics branch in 1945, and, after the laboratory moved to the Chalk River Laboratories in 1946, of the physics division in 1951. As such, he was involved in the design of the first Canadian nuclear reactors. For his wartime activities, Sargent was made a Member of the Order of the British Empire in 1946. He was awarded the Queen Elizabeth II Coronation Medal in 1953.

In 1951, Sargent left the Chalk River Laboratories to return to Queen's University as the head of its physics department and, from 1954 to 1972, as its R.S. Mclaughlin Research Professor. Under his management, the physics department expanded in size, and moved to new premises at Stirling Hall, which was built under his supervision. He stepped down as the head of the physics department in 1967, but continued teaching until he retired in 1972. He continued to perform research at Queen's and Chalk River until 1990, when his activities were curtailed due to illness.

In addition to his research activities, Sargent was a member of the Canadian Association of Physicists, serving its president from 1955 to 1956, and was an associate editor of the Canadian Journal of Physics from 1954 to 1968. He became a fellow of the Royal Society of Canada in 1941, and was the rapporteur and later convener of its Physics Subject Division from 1964 to 1966.

Sargent died in Kingston, Ontario, on 17 December 1993. He was survived by his wife, Dorothy.
