= Engelbert Broda =

Austrian chemist & suspected KGB operative (1910–83)

- Born: Engelbert Egon August Ernst Broda; 29 August 1910; Vienna, Austria-Hungary
- Died: 26 October 1983 (aged 73); Hainburg an der Donau, Lower Austria, Austria
- Education: University of Vienna
- Spouse: Hilde Gerwing (m. 1935–1946)
- Partner: Edith Tudor-Hart (c. 1942–1947)
- Scientific career
- Fields: Chemistry
- Workplaces: University of Vienna; Cavendish Laboratory; University College London
- Thesis: 1. Über den Röntgenzerfall von Ammonpersulfatlösungen. 2. Studien zum viskosimetrischen und osmotischen Verhalten der Hochpolymeren in Lösung (1934)
- Doctoral advisor: Herman Francis Mark

Engelbert Egon August Ernst Broda (29 August 1910 – 26 October 1983) was an Austrian chemist and a suspected atomic spy for the Soviet Union.

== Early life ==
Broda was born in Vienna as the first son of Ernst Broda, a lawyer and civil servant, and Viola Broda (née Pabst), a stage actress and the sister of film director G. W. Pabst. The Broda family was originally Jewish, but Engelbert's grandparents had converted to Catholicism in 1879. His younger brother Christian Broda would become a lawyer and Social Democratic politician, later serving as Austria's minister of justice. In his youth, Engelbert Broda was strongly influenced by his godfather Egon Schönhof, a lawyer who returned to Austria as a convinced communist after serving time as a prisoner-of-war in Russia during World War I.

Upon graduation from the Akademisches Gymnasium in Vienna in 1928, Broda began studying chemistry at the University of Vienna. In 1931 he relocated to Berlin to continue his studies there; after the Nazi Party seized power in 1933, he was expelled from Germany due to his communist activism. Broda completed his PhD in Vienna under Herman Francis Mark in 1934. He then worked as Mark's private assistant, and from 1937 also as a patent attorney trainee.

After being arrested in June 1935, Broda fled to Czechoslovakia. In December 1935 he traveled to Moscow, working in a factory laboratory. Broda returned to Vienna in late 1936, after chancellor Kurt Schuschnigg announced an amnesty for many political prisoners. He was once again forced to flee Austria following the Anschluss in 1938, this time for the United Kingdom.

== Scientific career ==
After being interned twice upon his arrival to the UK, Broda settled in England and was employed as a post-doctoral researcher at University College London, where he investigated the transformations of light into chemical energy at the Medical Research Council. Supported by William Bragg, he was employed as a staff scientist at the Cavendish Laboratory, University of Cambridge, in 1941, where he investigated on radioactivity and nuclear fission.

In 1946 Broda worked as a lecturer at the University of Edinburgh, before returning to Vienna the following year. After completing his habilitation in 1948, he joined the faculty of the University of Vienna. Broda was made an associate professor of applied physical chemistry and radiochemistry there in 1954, and was a full professor in 1968–1980.

== Anti-nuclear and environmental activism ==
In the 1950s, Broda became a leading figure in the Pugwash Movement in support of nuclear disarmament. In the 1970s he was involved in the opposition to a projected hydroelectric power plant in Dürnstein, Wachau. He also opposed the start-up of the Zwentendorf Nuclear Power Plant, which led to the rejection of the peaceful use of nuclear power in the 1978 Austrian nuclear power referendum.

== Espionage allegations ==
In the book Spies. The Rise and Fall of the KGB in America (2009), written by John Earl Haynes, Harvey Klehr, and Alexander Vassiliev, Broda was accused of espionage for the Soviet Union during his time in the UK in the 1940s. At the Cavendish Laboratory he had been an assistant to Hans von Halban, a major participant in Tube Alloys, the British atomic project; as such, Broda had access to key classified information, including on the British contribution to the American-led Manhattan Project.^{:65} Based on files from the Mitrokhin Archive accessed by Vassiliev, Broda – under the codename "Eric" – provided classified information to the KGB, greatly aiding the Soviet nuclear program. In a KGB cable from August 1943, "Eric" was described as "at pres[ent], the main source of info[rmation]" on the Manhattan Project in both the UK and the USA.^{:67}

Aware of Broda's communist affiliations, the MI5 had advised caution to the Department of Scientific and Industrial Research when he was offered a position at the Cavendish Laboratory; although the employment went along anyway, Broda was closely monitored until his resignation from Cavendish in 1946. A summary in Broda's file states the MI5 was certain that he had been involved in espionage during the war, but lacked evidence to prove it. The MI5 also held it possible that Broda had recruited the convicted spy Alan Nunn May for the Soviet GRU.

== Personal life ==
Broda married Hilde Gerwing, a medical student and anti-Nazi refugee from Berlin, in 1935; they had one son, Paul, born in 1939. The marriage ended in divorce in 1946. Hilde later married Alan Nunn May after his release from prison in 1953. Paul Broda would write a book about his parents and stepfather, Scientist Spies (2011).

From early 1942, Broda had an affair with the Austrian-born photographer and Soviet agent Edith Tudor-Hart. The two knew each other from Vienna; it has been alleged that it was Tudor-Hart who recruited Broda as a spy.^{:65–66}

Broda died from a heart attack during a walk in Hainburg an der Donau in October 1983. He is buried at Vienna Central Cemetery.

== Works ==
- Kräfte des Weltalls (Vienna: Globus, 1954)
- Ludwig Boltzmann. Mensch, Physiker, Philosoph (Vienna: Deuticke, 1955)
- Atomkraft – Furcht und Hoffnung (Vienna: Globus, 1956)
- The Evolution of the Bioenergetic Processes (Oxford: Pergamon Press, 1975)
- Wissenschaft, Verantwortung, Frieden. Ausgewählte Schriften (Vienna: Deuticke, 1985)
