= Andrew Hendry =

American biologist

- Born: March 24, 1968 (age 58); Woodland, California
- Citizenship: American; Canadian
- Education: University of Victoria; University of Washington
- Awards: Leo Yaffe Award for Excellence in Teaching from McGill University (2017); Tier 1 Canada Research Chair (2018–2024)
- Scientific career
- Fields: Biology
- Institutions: McGill University
- Thesis: Reproductive energetics of pacific salmon: Strategies, tactics, and trade-offs (1998)
- Doctoral advisor: Thomas P. Quinn
- Doctoral students: Luis Fernando De León

Andrew Paul Hendry (born March 24, 1968) is a Canadian biologist and professor in the Department of Biology and the Redpath Museum at McGill University. He holds dual citizenship of both Canada and the United States. He has been named a tier 1 Canada Research Chair from 2018 to 2024.
