= Wallace Akers =

British chemist and industrialist

Sir Wallace Akers CBE FRS
- Born: 9 September 1888; Walthamstow, England
- Died: 1 November 1954 (aged 66); Alton, Hampshire, England
- Education: Aldenham School; Christ Church, Oxford
- Occupations: Chemist and industrialist
- Years active: 1911–53
- Employer(s): Brunner Mond; Borneo Company; Imperial Chemical Industries; Tube Alloys
- Known for: Director of the Tube Alloys project

Sir Wallace Alan Akers CBE FRS (9 September 1888 – 1 November 1954) was a British chemist and industrialist. Beginning his academic career at Oxford he specialized in physical chemistry. During the Second World War, he was the director of the Tube Alloys project, a clandestine programme aiming to research and develop British atomic weapons capabilities, from 1941 to 1945. After the war he was director of research at Imperial Chemical Industries. He also served as a member of the Advisory Council of the Department of Scientific and Industrial Research, and the committee that drew up the organisation of what became the United Kingdom Atomic Energy Authority. He died in 1954 at the age of 66.

== Biography ==
Wallace Alan Akers was born in Walthamstow, England, the second child of an accountant, Charles Akers, and his wife, Mary Ethelreda née Brown. He was educated at Lake House School in Bexhill-on-Sea, Essex, and Aldenham School in Hertfordshire. He entered Christ Church, Oxford, where he specialised in physical chemistry, graduating with first class honours in 1909.

After university, he joined Brunner Mond & Company in Winnington, Cheshire, as a researcher. In 1924 he joined the Borneo Company, where he served as its general manager in the Far East. He returned to England in 1928, to join Imperial Chemical Industries, into which Brunner Mond had earlier merged. In 1931 he became the chairman of the Billingham division of ICI. This was mainly concerned with the manufacture of ammonia using hydrogen under high pressure, ammonia being one of the company's most profitable products at the time.

Between 1933 and 1936 he was involved in a project to produce synthetic petrol from the hydrogenation of coal. ICI executives envisaged competing with oil companies. It became clear that the process would not be competitive, but since it had defence implications, he sought government subsidies. In this he was opposed by Sir John Anderson, the permanent secretary at the Home Office. The change of government following the October 1931 general election brought with it a change in policy, and he was able to secure some financial relief.

A reorganisation of ICI in 1937 ended Akers' chairmanship of the Billingham division, and he was posted to ICI headquarters, where he worked closely with Holbrook Gaskell. At this time, Britain was starting to re-arm. Munitions contracts had begun to roll in, and ICI expanded its production capacity. He became executive manager in 1939.

During 1941 Akers was recruited by the British war-time government as director of the Tube Alloys project, a clandestine programme aiming to research and develop British atomic weapons capabilities. This helped galvanize both Britain and America to proceed down a path which led to the Manhattan Project, and ultimately the atomic bombings of Hiroshima and Nagasaki. Official Historian Margaret Gowing noted that "No doubt Akers had been picked for his personality and drive that had been considered so important and which he possessed in abundance".

Akers' ICI background led to difficulties when it came to dealing with the American Manhattan Project. American officials such as Vannevar Bush, James Conant and Leslie Groves saw him as "an Imperial Chemical Industries man at heart", and he aroused American suspicions that British interest in atomic energy was with its commercial possibilities after the war. As a result, James Chadwick was appointed the head of the British mission to the Manhattan Project, but Akers remained director of Tube Alloys until the end of the war.

In 1946, Akers returned to the Board of ICI where he served as director of research until April 1953, when he retired, having reached the compulsory retirement age of 65. He established university research fellowships, and donated money to university laboratories for research purposes. In 1946, he established the Butterwick Research Laboratories to carry out fundamental research, unrelated to commercial objectives. They were later renamed the Akers Research Laboratories in his honour.

Akers was made a Commander of the Order of the British Empire (CBE) in 1944, and was knighted in 1946, both for his services to the war effort. He became a fellow of the Royal Society in 1953, and received honorary degrees of D.Sc. from Durham University and D.C.L. from Oxford University.

After his retirement, he remained a member of the Advisory Council of the Department of Scientific and Industrial Research, and was part of the three-man April 1953 committee that drew up the organisation of what became the United Kingdom Atomic Energy Authority. He was a member of the National Gallery's scientific advisory committee, later becoming a trustee, and was the treasurer of the Chemical Society from 1948 to 1954. He married Bernadette Marie La Marre in 1953, and died at their home in Alton, Hampshire, on 1 November 1954.
