= Luis Fernando De León =

- Education: University of Panama (B.S.); McGill University (Ph.D.)
- Scientific career
- Fields: Evolutionary Ecology, Adaptive radiation
- Workplaces: University of Massachusetts Boston
- Doctoral advisor: Andrew Hendry
- Website: www.deleonlab.com

Luis Fernando De León is a Panamanian evolutionary biologist. He is an assistant professor of biology and evolutionary biology at the University of Massachusetts Boston, research associate at the Instituto de Investigaciones Científicas y Servicios de Alta Tecnología de Panamá (INDICASAT), and level I member of the Sistema Nacional de Investigadores (SNI) in Panama.

== Education ==
Luis completed a B.Sc. in Biology at University of Panama in 2002. He earned a Ph.D. from McGill University in 2011.

== Research ==
Luis Fernando De León has published over 40 peer-reviewed scientific papers which together have received over 700 citations. His research focuses on adaptive divergence and speciation, human impacts on evolution, eco-evolutionary dynamics. His lab works primarily on Darwin's finches and weakly-electric fishes in the order Gymnotiformes. He was invited to be the Saul Speaker at Middlebury College in 2020.
