= Montreal Laboratory =

Allied physics laboratory during World War II

Coordinates: 45°30′17″N 73°36′46″W

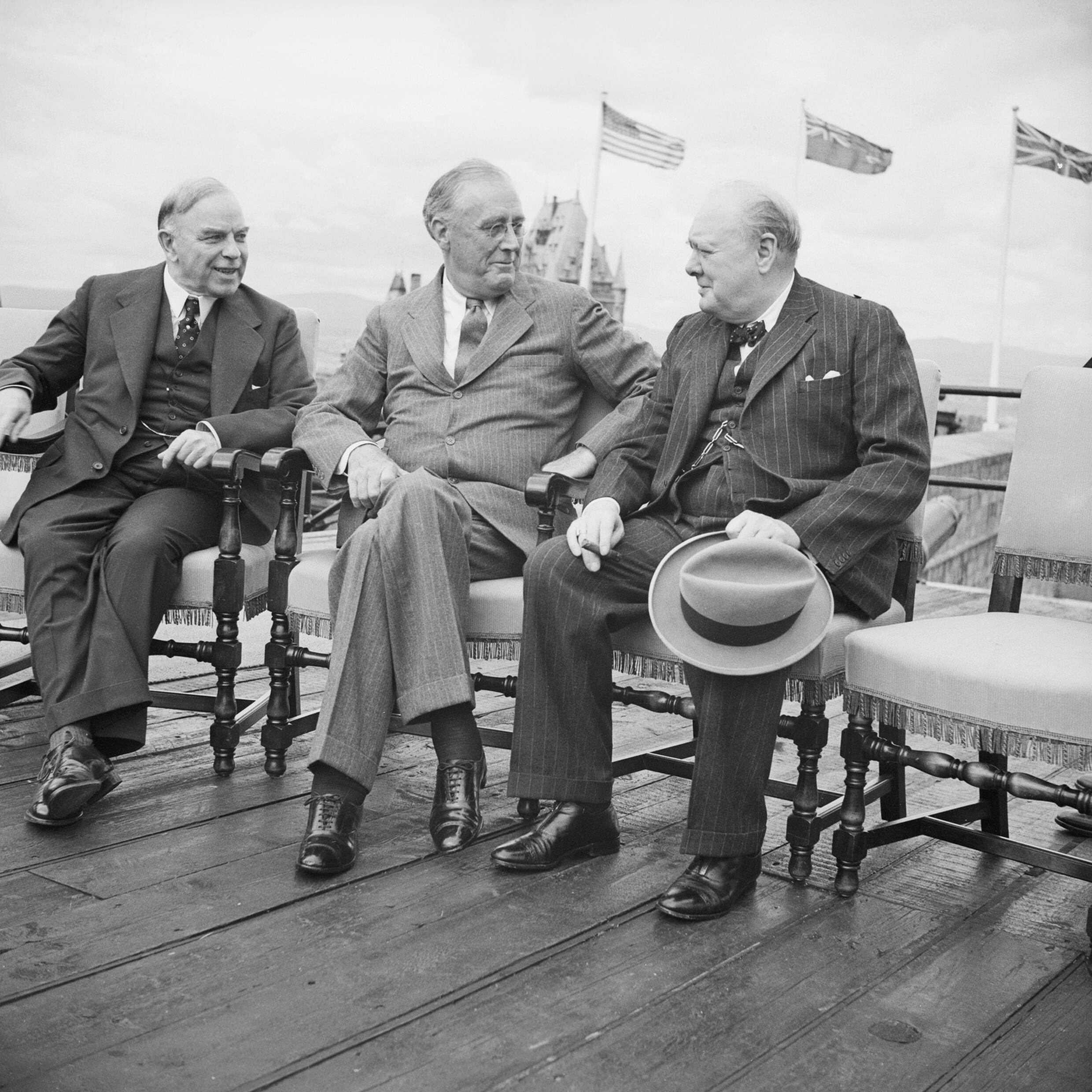
Canadian Prime Minister Mackenzie King with U. S. President Franklin D Roosevelt and British Prime Minister Winston Churchill during the Quebec Conference, 18 August 1943, at which the mechanism for cooperation on Tube Alloys was agreed upon

The Montreal Laboratory (French: laboratoire de Montréal) was a program established by the National Research Council of Canada in the 1940s during World War II to undertake nuclear research in collaboration with the United Kingdom, and to absorb some of the scientists and work of the Tube Alloys nuclear project in Britain. It became part of the Manhattan Project, and designed and built some of the world's first nuclear reactors.

After the Fall of France, some French scientists escaped to Britain with their stock of heavy water. They were temporarily installed in the Cavendish Laboratory at the University of Cambridge, where they worked on reactor design. The MAUD Committee was uncertain whether this was relevant to the main task of Tube Alloys, that of building an atomic bomb, although there remained a possibility that a reactor could be used to breed plutonium, which might be used in one. It therefore recommended that they be relocated to the United States, and co-located with the Manhattan Project's reactor effort. Due to American concerns about security (many of the scientists were foreign nationals) and patent claims by the French scientists and Imperial Chemical Industries (ICI), it was decided to relocate them to Canada instead.

The Canadian government agreed to the proposal, and the Montreal Laboratory was established in a house belonging to McGill University; it moved to permanent accommodation at the Université de Montréal in March 1943. The first eight laboratory staff arrived in Montreal at the end of 1942. These were Bertrand Goldschmidt and Pierre Auger from France, George Placzek from Czechoslovakia, S. G. Bauer from Switzerland, Friedrich Paneth and Hans von Halban from Austria, and R. E. Newell and F. R. Jackson from Britain. The Canadian contingent included George Volkoff, Bernice Weldon Sargent and George Laurence, and promising young Canadian scientists such as J. Carson Mark, Phil Wallace and Leo Yaffe.

Although Canada was a major source of uranium ore and heavy water, these were controlled by the Americans. Anglo-American cooperation broke down, denying the Montreal Laboratory scientists access to the materials they needed to build a reactor. In 1943, the Quebec Agreement merged Tube Alloys with the American Manhattan Project. The Americans agreed to help build the reactor. Scientists who were not British subjects left, and John Cockcroft became the new director of the Montreal Laboratory in May 1944. The Chalk River Laboratories opened in 1944, and the Montreal Laboratory was closed in July 1946. Two reactors were built at Chalk River. The small ZEEP went critical on 5 September 1945, and the larger NRX on 21 July 1947. NRX was for a time the most powerful research reactor in the world.

== Early nuclear research in Canada ==
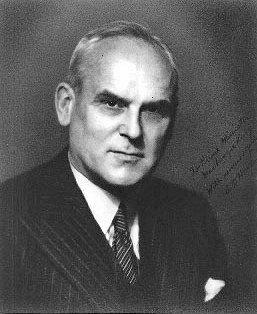
C. D. Howe, Minister of Munitions and Supply

Canada has a long history of involvement with nuclear research, dating back to the pioneering work of Ernest Rutherford at McGill University in 1899. In 1940, George Laurence of the National Research Council (NRC) began experiments in Ottawa to measure neutron capture and nuclear fission in uranium to demonstrate the feasibility of a nuclear reactor. For that purpose, he obtained 450 kilograms (990 lb) of uranium dioxide in paper bags from the Eldorado Mine at Port Radium in the Northwest Territories. For a neutron moderator, he used carbon in the form of petroleum coke. This was placed with the bags of uranium oxide in a large wooden bin lined with paraffin wax, another neutron moderator. A neutron source was added and a Geiger counter used to measure radioactivity.

The experiments continued in 1942, but were ultimately unsuccessful; the problems posed by impurities in the coke and uranium oxide had not been fully appreciated, and as a result too many neutrons were captured. But Laurence's efforts attracted some attention, and in the summer of 1940 he was visited by R. H. Fowler, the British scientific liaison officer in Canada. This was followed by a visit from John Cockcroft of the British Tizard Mission to the United States in the autumn. They brought news of the similar research being carried out under the supervision of the MAUD Committee in Britain and the National Defense Research Committee (NDRC) in the United States.

Fowler became the channel of communication between the NDRC and its counterparts in Britain and Canada. Through him, Laurence obtained an introduction to Lyman J. Briggs, the chairman of the NDRC's S-1 Uranium Committee, who supplied copies of American studies. On returning to England, Cockcroft arranged through Lord Melchett for Laurence to receive a $5,000 grant to continue his research. This payment was made by Imperial Chemical Industries (ICI) through a Canadian subsidiary. It had the desired side effect of impressing the Canadian authorities with the importance of Laurence's work.

== French connection ==
Laurence had chosen to use carbon instead of heavy water because it was cheaper and more readily available. A team of scientists in France that included Hans von Halban, Lew Kowarski, and Francis Perrin had been conducting similar experiments since 1939. By 1940, they had decided to use heavy water as a moderator, and through the French Minister of Armaments obtained about 185 kilograms (408 lb) from the Norsk Hydro hydroelectric station at Vemork in Norway. After the Fall of France, they had escaped to Britain with their stock of heavy water. They were temporarily installed in the Cavendish Laboratory at the University of Cambridge but, believing that Britain would soon fall as well, were eager to relocate to the United States or Canada.

Canada was an alternative source of heavy water. Cominco had been involved in heavy water research since 1934, and produced it at its smelting plant in Trail, British Columbia. On 26 February 1941, the NRC inquired about its ability to produce heavy water. This was followed on 23 July by a letter from Hugh Taylor, a British-born scientist working at Princeton University, on behalf of the Office of Scientific Research and Development (OSRD). Taylor offered a NDRC contract to produce 2,000 pounds (910 kg), for which the NDRC was prepared to pay $5 per pound for low-grade and $10 for high-grade heavy water. At the time it was selling for up to $1,130 per pound.

Cominco's president, Selwyn G. Blaylock, was cautious. There might be no post-war demand for heavy water, and the patent on the process was held by Albert Edgar Knowles, so a profit-sharing agreement would be required. In response, Taylor offered $20,000 for plant modifications. There the matter rested until 6 December, when Blaylock had a meeting with the British physicist G. I. Higson, who informed him that Taylor had become discouraged with Cominco, and had decided to find another source of heavy water. Blaylock invited Taylor to visit Trail, which he did from 5 to 8 January 1942. The two soon found common ground. Blaylock agreed to produce heavy water at Trail, and quickly secured approval from the chairman of the board, Sir Edward Beatty. A contract was signed on 1 August 1942. The heavy water project became known as the P-9 Project in October 1942.

The French scientists made good progress on the design of an aqueous homogeneous reactor, but there were doubts that their work was relevant to the main task of the British Tube Alloys project, that of building an atomic bomb, and resources were tightly controlled in wartime Britain. There was a possibility that a reactor could be used to breed plutonium, but its use in a bomb seemed a remote possibility. The MAUD Committee therefore felt that they should relocate to America. It made sense to pool resources, and America had advantages, notably access to materials such as heavy water. American scientists such as Henry D. Smyth, Harold Urey and Hugh Taylor urged that the Cambridge team be sent to America. On the other hand, American officials had concerns about security, since only one of the six senior scientists in the Cambridge group was British, and about French patent claims. These included patents on controlling nuclear chain reactions, enriching uranium, and using deuterium as a neutron moderator. There were also two patent applications in conjunction with Egon Bretscher and Norman Feather on the production and use of plutonium. George Thomson, the chairman of the MAUD Committee, suggested a compromise: relocating the team to Canada.

== Establishment ==
The next step was to broach the matter with the Canadians. The Lord President, Sir John Anderson, as the minister responsible for Tube Alloys, wrote to the British High Commissioner to Canada, Malcolm MacDonald, who had been involved in Tube Alloys negotiations with Canada regarding Eldorado's uranium mine at Port Radium and its refinery in Port Hope, Ontario. On 19 February 1942, MacDonald, Thomson and Wallace Akers, the director of Tube Alloys, met with C. J. Mackenzie, the president of the NRC, who enthusiastically supported the proposal. The following day he took them to see C. D. Howe, the Minister of Munitions and Supply.

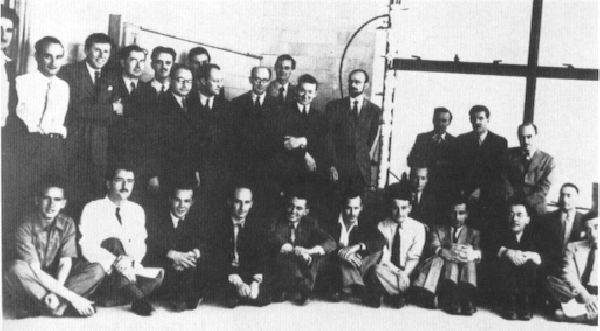
Montreal Laboratory staff in 1944

Howe cabled Anderson expressing the Canadian government's agreement in principle, but requesting a more detailed appraisal of the cost of the proposed laboratory. Sir John Anderson replied that he envisaged a laboratory with about 30 scientists and 25 laboratory assistants, of whom 22 scientists and 6 laboratory assistants would be sent from Britain. The estimated running cost was £60,000 per annum. He agreed that the costs and salaries would be divided between the British and Canadian governments, but the British share would come from a billion-dollar war gift from Canada. The Canadians found this acceptable. Howe and Mackenzie then travelled to London to finalise arrangements for the laboratory's governance. It was agreed that it would be run by a Policy Committee consisting of Howe and MacDonald and be administered by and funded through the NRC, with research directed by a Technical Committee chaired by Halban.

The Canadians decided that the new laboratory should be located in Montreal, where housing accommodation was easier to find than in wartime Ottawa. They hoped to have everything ready by 1 January 1943, but negotiations for laboratory space fell through. A search then commenced for an alternative location. Bertrand Goldschmidt, a French scientist who was already in Canada, ran into Henri Laugier, a French biologist who had been president of the Centre national de la recherche scientifique before the Fall of France, when he had escaped to Canada. Laugier suggested that they acquire some unused wings of a new building at the Université de Montréal, where he was now teaching. These had been earmarked for a medical school, but had never been equipped due to a lack of funds. The 200-square-metre (2,200 sq ft) space was acquired, but considerable work was required to convert it into a laboratory, and it could not be made ready before mid-February 1943. Ernest Cormier, the university architect, drew up the plans.

The first eight staff arrived in Montreal at the end of 1942. These were Goldschmidt and Pierre Auger from France, George Placzek from Czechoslovakia, S. G. Bauer from Switzerland, Friedrich Paneth and Halban from Austria, and R. E. Newell and F. R. Jackson from Britain. The Battle of the Atlantic was still raging, and men and equipment, which travelled separately, were at risk from German U-boats. The scientists occupied a house at 3470 Simpson Street in downtown Montreal that belonged to McGill University. This soon became so crowded that bathrooms were used for offices, with the bath tubs used to store papers and books. They were relieved to move to the more spacious accommodation at the Université de Montréal in March. The laboratory grew to over 300 staff, about half of whom were Canadians recruited by Laurence.

Placzek became head of the theoretical physics division. Kowarski was designated to be the head of the experimental physics division, but there was a personality clash with Halban, and Kowarski did not wish to accept what he saw as a subordinate position under Halban. At this point, many other scientists said that they would not go without Kowarski, but Sir Edward Appleton, the permanent secretary of the British Department of Scientific and Industrial Research, of which the Tube Alloys was a part, managed to persuade them to go. Kowarski remained at Cambridge, where he worked for James Chadwick. Auger became head of the experimental physics division instead. Paneth became head of the chemistry division. Two other scientists that had escaped from France joined the laboratory: the French chemist Jules Guéron, who had been working for Free France at Cambridge, and Bruno Pontecorvo, an Italian scientist who had worked with Enrico Fermi in Italy before the war.

For the Canadian contingent, Laurence and Mackenzie set out to recruit some top nuclear physicists, of whom there were few in Canada. The first was George Volkoff at the University of British Columbia, who had worked with Robert Oppenheimer on the physics of neutron stars. They also tried to recruit Harry Thode from McMaster University, but found that Harold Urey from the Manhattan Project's SAM Laboratories was also interested in Thode's expertise in testing heavy water with mass spectrography, and had made a more attractive offer. A compromise was reached whereby Thode did work for the Montreal Laboratory, but remained at McMaster University. Promising young Canadian scientists were also recruited, including J. Carson Mark, Phil Wallace and Leo Yaffe.

== Research ==
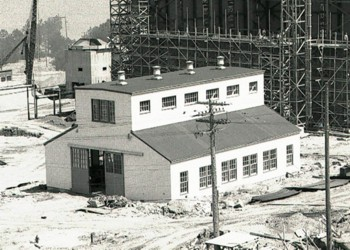
ZEEP building at the Chalk River Laboratories c. 1945

The Montreal Laboratory investigated multiple avenues of reactor development. One was a homogeneous reactor, in which a uranium compound was dissolved in heavy water to form a slurry, or a "mayonnaise" as the Montreal team called it. This offered various advantages for cooling, control and the ability to draw off plutonium that was produced. Paneth, Goldschmidt and others experimented with methods of preparing such a uranium compound, but none could be found with the required density. They considered using enriched uranium, but it was unavailable. Attention then turned to a heterogeneous reactor, in which a lattice of uranium metal rods were immersed in heavy water. While much less heavy water would be required, there was a danger that the water would decompose into deuterium and oxygen—a potentially explosive combination. There was great interest in breeder reactors, which could breed plutonium from uranium or uranium-233 from thorium, as it was believed that uranium was scarce. A process was devised for separating the uranium from thorium.

To build a working nuclear reactor, the Montreal Laboratory depended on the Americans for heavy water from Trail, which was under American contract, but this was not forthcoming. An American request for Halban to come to New York to discuss heavy water with Fermi and Urey was turned down by the British, and the Americans brought cooperation to a standstill. By June 1943 work at the Montreal Lab had come to a halt. Morale was low and the Canadian Government proposed cancelling the project. The British government seriously considered going it alone on developing nuclear weapons, despite the cost and the expected length of the project. In August 1943, Canadian Prime Minister Mackenzie King hosted the Quebec Conference, at which Winston Churchill and Franklin D. Roosevelt came together, and agreed to resume cooperation. The Quebec Agreement subsumed Tube Alloys into the Manhattan Project, and established the Combined Policy Committee, on which Canada was represented by Howe, to control the Manhattan Project.

While some aspects of cooperation resumed quickly, it took longer to finalize the details with respect to the Montreal Laboratory. Brigadier General Leslie Groves (the director of the Manhattan Project), Chadwick (now the head of the British Mission to the Manhattan Project), and Mackenzie negotiated recommendations, which were approved by the Combined Policy Committee on 13 April 1944. A final agreement was spelt out on 20 May. Under it, the Americans would assist with the construction of a heavy water reactor in Canada, and would provide technical assistance with matters such as corrosion and the effects of radiation on materials. They would not provide details about plutonium or plutonium chemistry, although irradiated uranium slugs would be made available for the British to work it out for themselves. The Americans had already built their own heavy water reactor, Chicago Pile-3, which went critical in May 1944. The September 1944 Hyde Park Agreement extended both commercial and military cooperation into the post-war period.

Hans von Halban had proved to be an unfortunate choice as he was a poor administrator, and did not work well with Mackenzie or the NRC. The Americans saw him as a security risk, and objected to the French atomic patents claimed by the Paris Group (in association with ICI). In April 1944 a Combined Policy Committee meeting at Washington agreed that Canada would build a heavy water reactor. Scientists who were not British subjects would leave, and Cockcroft became the new director of the Montreal Laboratory in May 1944. E. W. R. Steacie became assistant director and head of the Chemistry division when Paneth left. Volkoff eventually succeeded Placzek as head of the Theoretical Physics division. Halban remained as head of the nuclear physics division.

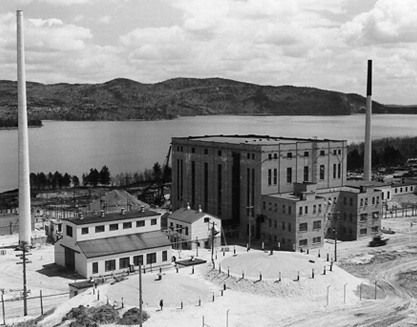
NRX and ZEEP buildings at the Chalk River Laboratories

After the Liberation of Paris in August 1944, the French scientists wanted to go home. Auger had already returned to London to join the French Scientific Mission in April 1944. Halban returned on a visit to London and Paris in November 1944, where he saw Frédéric Joliot-Curie for the first time since leaving France. While he maintained that he did not divulge any nuclear secrets to his previous boss (although he had discussed patent rights), Halban was not allowed to work or to leave North America for a year, although he left the Montreal Laboratory in April 1945. In 1946 he settled in England. B. W. Sargent then became head of the nuclear physics division. Cockcroft arranged for Goldschmidt, Guéron and Kowarski to remain until June 1945, later extended until the end of 1945. Goldschmidt was willing to stay longer, and Cockcroft wanted to keep him, but Groves insisted that he should go, and, in the interest of Allied harmony, he did. All the French scientists had left by January 1946.

On 24 August 1944, the decision was taken to build a small reactor to test the group's calculations relating to such matters as lattice dimensions, sheathing materials, and control rods, before proceeding with the full-scale NRX reactor. With Halban gone, Kowarski joined the laboratory, and was given responsibility for the small reactor, which he named ZEEP, for Zero Energy Experimental Pile. He was assisted in the design by Charles Watson-Munro from New Zealand, and George Klein and Don Nazzer from Canada. Building reactors in downtown Montreal was out of the question; the Canadians selected, and Groves approved, a site at Chalk River, Ontario, on the south bank of the Ottawa River some 110 miles (180 km) northwest of Ottawa.

The Americans fully supported the reactor project with information and visits. Groves loaned the Montreal Laboratory 19 short tons (17 t) of heavy water and 5 short tons (4.5 t) of pure uranium metal for the reactor, and samples of pure and irradiated uranium and thorium to develop the extraction process. The irradiated materials came from the Manhattan Project's X-10 Graphite Reactor at the Clinton Engineer Works at Oak Ridge, Tennessee. Some 10 short tons (9.1 t) of machined pure uranium rods was sold outright to Canada. He also supplied instruments, drawings and technical information, provided expertise from American scientists, and opened a liaison office in Montreal headed by Major H. S. Benbow. The American physicist William Weldon Watson from the Metallurgical Laboratory and chemist John R. Huffman from the SAM Laboratories were assigned to it. They were succeeded by George Weil in November 1945. Benbow was succeeded by Major P. Firmin in December 1945, who in turn was replaced by Colonel A. W. Nielson in February 1946.

The Chalk River Laboratories opened in 1944, and the Montreal Laboratory was closed in July 1946. ZEEP went critical on 5 September 1945, becoming the first operating nuclear reactor outside the United States. Using 5 short tons (4.5 t) of heavy water and 3.5 short tons (3.2 t) of uranium metal, it could operate continuously at 3.5 W, or for brief periods at 30 to 50 W. The larger NRX followed on 21 July 1947. With five times the neutron flux of any other reactor, it was the most powerful research reactor in the world. Originally designed in July 1944 with an output of 8 MW, the power was raised to 10 MW through design changes such as replacing uranium rods clad in stainless steel and cooled by heavy water with aluminium-clad rods cooled by light water.

By the end of 1946, the Montreal Laboratory was estimated to have cost US$22,232,000, excluding the cost of the heavy water. The NRX reactor provided Britain, the United States and Canada with a source of fissile plutonium and uranium-233. It also provided a means of efficiently producing medical isotopes like phosphorus-32, research facilities that for a time were superior to those in the United States, and a wealth of technical information related to reactor design and operation. With the passage of the Canadian Atomic Energy Act of 1946, the responsibility for the Chalk River Laboratories passed to the Atomic Energy Control Board.

== Atomic spies ==
On 5 September 1945, Igor Gouzenko, a cypher clerk at the Soviet Union's embassy in Ottawa, and his family defected to Canada. He brought with him copies of cables detailing Soviet intelligence (GRU) espionage activities in Canada. Agents included Alan Nunn May, who secretly supplied tiny samples of uranium-233 and uranium-235 to GRU agent Pavel Angelov in July 1945; Fred Rose, a member of parliament; and NRC scientists Israel Halperin, Edward Mazerall and Durnford Smith. Pontecorvo, who defected to the Soviet Union in 1950, has long been suspected of having been involved in espionage. No evidence that he was a Soviet agent has ever been established, but the GRU obtained samples of uranium and blueprints of the NRX, for which Nunn May could not have been the source, and Pontecorvo remains the prime suspect. When the spy ring became public knowledge in February 1946, the Americans became more cautious about sharing information with Britain and Canada.

== Cooperation ends ==
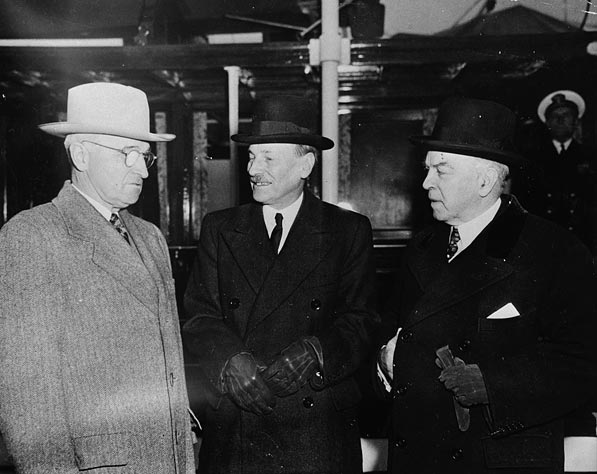
President Harry Truman and prime ministers Clement Attlee and Mackenzie King boarding USS Sequoia for discussions about nuclear weapons, November 1945

The Montreal Laboratory had been a fruitful and successful international venture, although the Canadians had on occasion been resentful of British actions that were perceived as high-handed and insensitive. One such action came in November 1945 when the British government suddenly announced that Cockcroft had been appointed the head of the new Atomic Energy Research Establishment in Britain without any prior consultation and at a time when the NRX reactor was still under construction. Cockcroft did not depart Canada until September 1946, but it was a sure sign of waning British interest in collaboration with Canada. The British suggested he be replaced by the British physicist Bennett Lewis, who was eventually appointed, but only after the Canadian-born Walter Zinn turned the job down.

Anglo-American cooperation did not long survive the war. Roosevelt died on 12 April 1945, and the Hyde Park Agreement was not binding on subsequent administrations. The Special Relationship between Britain and the United States "became very much less special". The British government had trusted that America would share nuclear technology, which the British considered a joint discovery. On 9 November 1945, Mackenzie King and British Prime Minister Clement Attlee went to Washington, D.C., to confer with President Harry Truman about future cooperation in nuclear weapons and nuclear power. A Memorandum of Intention that replaced the Quebec Agreement made Canada a full partner. The three leaders agreed that there would be full and effective cooperation, but British hopes for a resumption of cooperation on nuclear weapons were in vain. The Americans soon made it clear that cooperation was restricted to basic scientific research.

At the Combined Policy Committee meeting in February 1946, without prior consultation with Canada, the British announced their intention to build a graphite-moderated nuclear reactor in the United Kingdom. An outraged Howe told Canadian ambassador Lester B. Pearson to inform the committee that nuclear cooperation between Britain and Canada was at an end. The Canadians had been given what they deemed assurances that the Chalk River Laboratories would be a joint enterprise, and regarded the British decision as a breach of faith. Anglo-American cooperation largely ended in April 1946 when Truman declared that the United States would not assist Britain in the design, construction or operation of a plutonium production reactor. The Americans had agreed that such a facility could be built in Canada, but the British were not willing to be dependent on Canada for the supply of fissile material.
