= J. Carson Mark =

Canadian-American mathematician (1913–1997)

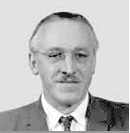
- J. Carson Mark
- Born: Jordan Carson Mark; July 6, 1913; Lindsay, Ontario, Canada
- Died: March 2, 1997 (aged 83); Los Alamos, New Mexico, United States
- Citizenship: American
- Education: University of Western Ontario (BA, 1935); University of Toronto (PhD, 1938)
- Known for: nuclear weapon development
- Scientific career
- Fields: Mathematics
- Workplaces: Los Alamos National Laboratory
- Thesis: On the Modular Representations of the Group GLH(3,P) (1939)
- Doctoral advisor: Richard Brauer

Jordan Carson Mark (July 6, 1913 – March 2, 1997) was a Canadian-American mathematician best known for his work on developing nuclear weapons for the United States at the Los Alamos National Laboratory. Mark joined the Manhattan Project in 1945, and continued to work at Los Alamos under the leadership of Norris Bradbury after World War II ended. He became the leader of the Theoretical Division at the laboratory in 1947, a position he held until 1973. He oversaw the development of new weapons, including the hydrogen bomb in the 1950s. On the hydrogen bomb project he was able to bring together experts like Edward Teller, Stanislaw Ulam and Marshall Holloway despite their personal differences.

In July and August 1958, and again the following year, Mark was a scientific adviser to the United States delegation at the Conference of Experts on Detection of Nuclear Explosions. He served on the United States Air Force's Scientific Advisory Board, and its Foreign Weapons Evaluation Group. After he retired from Los Alamos in 1973 he served on the Nuclear Regulatory Commission's Advisory Committee on Reactor Safeguards, and was a consultant for the Nuclear Control Institute.

== Biography ==
Jordan Carson Mark was born in Lindsay, Ontario, July 6, 1913. He had a brother, James, and five sisters, Margaret, Dorothy, Muriel, Frances and Tony. He received a Bachelor of Arts (BA) degree in mathematics and physics from the University of Western Ontario in 1935, and a Doctor of Philosophy (PhD) in mathematics from the University of Toronto in 1938, writing his thesis "On the Modular Representations of the Group GLH(3,P)" under the supervision of Richard Brauer.

Mark taught mathematics at the University of Manitoba, from 1938 until World War II, when he joined the Montreal Laboratory of the National Research Council of Canada in 1943. He came to the Los Alamos Laboratory in May 1945 as part of the British Mission to the Manhattan Project, although he remained a Canadian government employee. He remained at Los Alamos after the war ended, becoming head of its Theoretical Division in 1947, a position he remained in until he retired in 1973. He became a United States citizen in the 1950s.

In 1947 the Los Alamos Laboratory, under the leadership of Norris Bradbury, was much smaller than it had been during the war, because most of the wartime staff had returned to their universities and laboratories, but it was still the center of American nuclear weapons development, and the Theoretical Division was for many years the center of the laboratory. The Laboratory made great strides in improving the weapons, making them easier to manufacture, stockpile and handle. The Operation Sandstone tests in 1948 demonstrated that uranium-235 could be used in implosion-type nuclear weapons.

Mark played a key role in the development of thermonuclear weapons in the early 1950s. A crash program to develop the hydrogen bomb was approved by President Harry S. Truman in January 1950 at Edward Teller's urging before the laboratory had a workable design. This put the laboratory under great pressure. Hans Bethe recalled that "There was a lot of controversy in Los Alamos in those days, and Carson always was imperturbable and stood in the middle of it and had a balanced judgment." When Stanislaw Ulam finally came up with a workable design, it was Mark that he approached first. Mark took the Ulam design to Bradbury, and they put the idea to Teller. "Teller then completed and extended the invention," Bethe noted, "so, in this case, Carson was the mediator between two people who really didn't like each other." "Within an hour of Carson's ... remarks," Teller recalled, "I knew how to move ahead". The Teller-Ulam design would become that of all thermonuclear weapons.

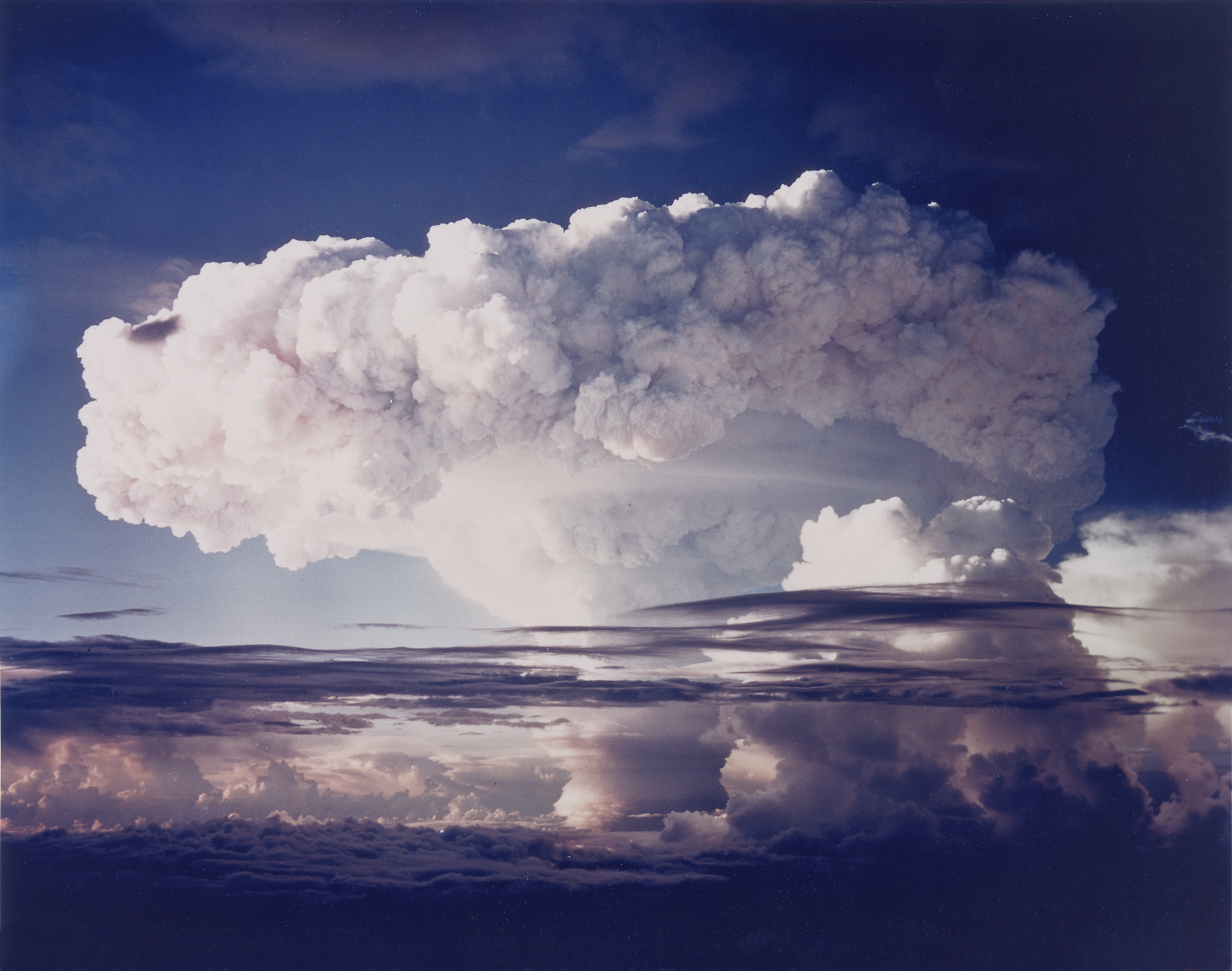
The Ivy Mike nuclear test, November 1952

When it came to testing the design in the Ivy Mike nuclear test, Mark again had a crucial go-between role. Bradbury placed Marshall Holloway in charge, but Holloway and Teller did not get along. Mark later recalled that:

I had to be the link with Holloway, since Teller refused. Bradbury asked me to do it. We [Holloway and I] got along fine. Teller up and left for Chicago without notice. Edward had nothing to do with the final preparations for the Mike shot. He inquired occasionally, but if had tried to help, he would have slowed it down. Bethe did participate. Holloway got the job done with little time to spare. I got along well with Marshall [Holloway] and his "henchmen".

The Ivy Mike test was successful, obliterating an island in Enewetak Atoll in the Pacific on November 1, 1952.

Frank Harlow, who joined the Theoretical Division in 1953, and was appointed as a group leader by Mark in 1959, noted that Mark took a personal interest in the computer systems, then a rapidly developing field. As most weapon research in the 1960s no longer involved the Theoretical Division, Mark branched out, sponsoring research into hydrodynamics, neutron physics and transport theory. He also supported Frederick Reines's research into neutrinos, for which Reines was awarded the Nobel Prize in Physics in 1995.

In July and August 1958, and again the following year, Mark was a scientific adviser to the United States delegation at the Conference of Experts on Detection of Nuclear Explosions. Delegates from Western and Eastern bloc countries discussed detection methods in the context of negotiations that eventually led to the Partial Test Ban Treaty, which banned most forms of nuclear testing. He was committed to preventing nuclear weapons proliferation. He spoke at Pugwash Conferences, and wrote a paper dispelling the myth that reactor-grade plutonium could not be used for nuclear weapons.

Mark was member of the American Mathematical Society and the American Physical Society, and served on the United States Air Force's Scientific Advisory Board, and its Foreign Weapons Evaluation Group. After he retired from Los Alamos in 1973 he served on the Nuclear Regulatory Commission's Advisory Committee on Reactor Safeguards, and was a consultant for the Nuclear Control Institute. One of his last papers was on Iraq's nuclear weapons capability.

Mark died in Los Alamos, New Mexico, on March 2, 1997, from complications related to a fall. He was survived by his wife Kathleen, daughters, Joan, Elizabeth Mark and Mary, and sons, Thomas, Graham and Christopher, his brother, James and sister Dorothy .
