= Alan Nunn May =

British physicist and Soviet spy (1911–2003)

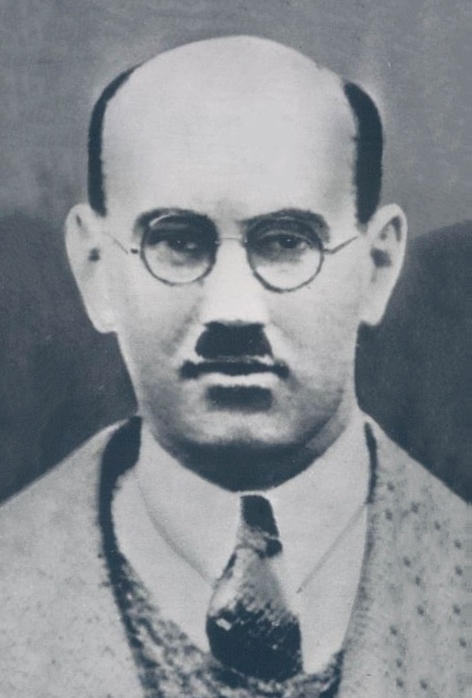
- Born: 2 May 1911; Bedruthan, Park Hill, Moseley, Birmingham, England
- Died: 12 January 2003 (aged 91); Cambridge, Cambridgeshire, England
- Education: Trinity Hall, Cambridge, King's College London
- Political party: Communist Party of Great Britain (CPGB)
- Criminal charges: Espionage
- Criminal penalty: 10 years of hard labour upon conviction at Old Bailey, London, UK (served 6 years)
- Spouse: Hilde Broda
- Children: 1 son

Alan Nunn May (sometimes Allan) (Note: May's first name is sometimes spelled Allan, with two l's, but both the Oxford Dictionary of National Biography and the Encyclopædia Britannica use Alan.) (2 May 1911 – 12 January 2003) was a British physicist and a confessed and convicted Soviet spy who supplied secrets of British and American atomic research to the Soviet Union during World War II.

== Early life and education ==
May was the youngest of four children of Walter Frederick Nunn May, a brassfounder, and Mary Annie, née Kendall. He was born in Bedruthan, Park Hill, Moseley, Birmingham, and educated at King Edward's School, Birmingham. As a scholarship student at Trinity Hall, Cambridge, he achieved a first in physics, which led to doctoral studies under Charles Ellis and lectureship at King's College London.

== Career ==
=== Early communist ties ===
May joined the Communist Party of Great Britain in the 1930s and was active in the Association of Scientific Workers. The Cambridge Five spy ring member Donald Duart Maclean was also at Trinity Hall during an overlapping period.

=== World War II ===
During World War II, May initially worked on radar in Suffolk and then with Cecil Powell in Bristol on a project that attempted to use photographic methods to detect fast particles from radioactive decay. James Chadwick recruited him to a Cambridge University team working on a possible heavy water reactor. The team was part of the British Tube Alloys directorate that was merged into the American Manhattan Project, the successful effort to create a nuclear weapon. In January 1943, the Cambridge team, including May, was transferred to the Montreal Laboratory, which was building a reactor at Chalk River, near Ottawa, Ontario, Canada. May's Canadian position ended in September 1945, and he returned to his lecturing post in London.

=== Soviet espionage ===
He had let his membership of the Communist Party lapse by 1940, but at Cambridge, when he saw an American report mentioning that Germany might be able to build a dirty bomb, he passed that on to a Soviet contact. In Canada, he was approached by Lieutenant Angelov of the GRU (Soviet military intelligence) for information on atomic research. He continued his espionage by secretly supplying small samples of the isotopes uranium-233 and 235. The courier of the samples was not informed of the danger of radiation, developed painful lesions and needed regular blood transfusions for the rest of his life. May also borrowed library research documents on nuclear power, many from the US, for copying. The Canadian Royal Commission later investigated and states that he was paid with two bottles of whisky and at least C$700. May said that he accepted the money under protest and promptly burnt it. Angelov gave him details for a rendezvous with the GRU next to the British Museum, in London, after his return.

=== Convicted of espionage ===
A GRU cipher clerk in Canada, Igor Gouzenko, defected to the West in Ottawa in September 1945, around the time that May's Canadian assignment ended. Gouzenko passed along copies of GRU documents implicating May, including details of the proposed meeting in London. May did not go to the British Museum meeting, but he was arrested in March 1946 and confessed to espionage. On 1 May 1946, he was sentenced to ten years' hard labour. He was released in late 1952, after serving six-and-a-half years.

May refused to define his actions as treason and claimed in a statement after his release from prison that he believed that he had "acted rightly" as a spy because of being "wholeheartedly concerned with securing victory over Nazi Germany and Japan, and the furtherance of the development of the peaceful uses of atomic energy."

Blacklisted from universities in Britain, May worked for a scientific instruments company and in 1961 he went to work at the University of Ghana, where he conducted research in solid-state physics and created a science museum.

== Personal life and death ==
In 1953, May married Hilde Broda, the ex-wife of Engelbert Broda. They had a son and a stepson from Hilde's previous marriage.

He returned to Cambridge in 1978 and died there in a hospital on 12 January 2003. Cause of death was pneumonia and pulmonary disease.

A 2002 statement, released after his death, confessed to his spying activities and detailed how he got embroiled with the Soviet Union, though his reasoning for passing along nuclear secrets was simply that he felt the Soviets "ought to be informed". It was passed to The Guardian newspaper in 2003 and had been dictated to a relative in late 2002.

== Legacy ==
May's arrest and sentence in 1946 first showed publicly that the Soviet Union had obtained atomic secrets by espionage. His clearance by MI5 also led to American distrust of Britain, and the McMahon Act. He passed on information on atomic reactors, but unlike Klaus Fuchs (who was arrested in 1950) he knew little of weapon design.

May is a major character in the 2003 novel The Cloud Chamber, by Clare George, a fictional account of Cambridge physicists in the 1930s which centres on the scientific excitement of the interwar years contrasted with the vexing moral questions faced by scientists during World War II. The main character is a fictional physicist and pacifist who studied and worked at Cambridge's Cavendish Laboratory with May before the war. George's acknowledged inspiration for the story was her grandfather, a real-life physicist whose true story follows several of the particulars of her character, Walter Dunnachie.

== See also ==
- Atomic spies
- Cold War espionage
- Nuclear espionage
- Soviet atomic bomb project
- Soviet espionage in the United States
