= HMCS Brandon (K149) =

Royal Canadian Navy Second World War Flower-class corvette

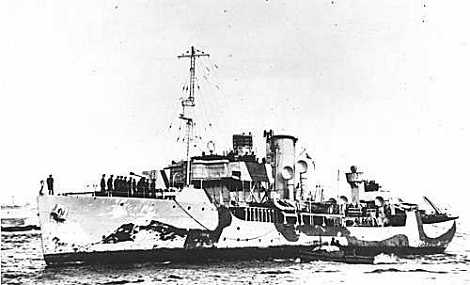
- HMCS Brandon

History

Canada
- Name: Brandon
- Namesake: Brandon, Manitoba
- Ordered: 22 January 1940
- Builder: Davie Shipbuilding, Lauzon
- Laid down: 10 October 1940
- Launched: 29 April 1941
- Commissioned: 22 July 1941
- Decommissioned: 22 June 1945
- Identification: Pennant number: K149
- Honours and awards: Atlantic 1941–45 Gulf of St. Lawrence 1944
- Fate: Scrapped 1945

General characteristics
- Class & type: Flower-class corvette (original)
- Displacement: 925 long tons (940 t; 1,036 short tons)
- Length: 205 ft (62.48 m)o/a
- Beam: 33 ft (10.06 m)
- Draught: 11.5 ft (3.51 m)
- Propulsion: single shaft; 2 × fire tube Scotch boilers; 1 × 4-cycle triple-expansion reciprocating steam engine; 2,750 ihp (2,050 kW)
- Speed: 16 knots (29.6 km/h)
- Range: 3,500 nautical miles (6,482 km) at 12 knots (22.2 km/h)
- Complement: 85
- Sensors & processing systems: 1 × SW1C or 2C radar; 1 × Type 123A or Type 127DV sonar
- Armament: 1 × BL 4-inch (101.6 mm) Mk.IX single gun; 2 × .50 cal machine gun (twin); 2 × Lewis .303 cal machine gun (twin); 2 × Mk.II depth charge throwers; 2 × depth charge rails with 40 depth charges; originally fitted with minesweeping gear, later removed

HMCS Brandon was a Flower-class corvette that served in the Royal Canadian Navy during the Second World War. She saw service primarily in the Battle of the Atlantic as an ocean escort. She was named for Brandon, Manitoba.

== Background ==
Flower-class corvettes like Brandon serving with the Royal Canadian Navy during the Second World War were different from earlier and more traditional sail-driven corvettes. The "corvette" designation was created by the French as a class of small warships; the Royal Navy borrowed the term for a period but discontinued its use in 1877. During the hurried preparations for war in the late 1930s, Winston Churchill reactivated the corvette class, needing a name for smaller ships used in an escort capacity, in this case based on a whaling ship design. The generic name "flower" was used to designate the class of these ships, which – in the Royal Navy – were named after flowering plants.

Corvettes commissioned by the Royal Canadian Navy during the Second World War were named after communities for the most part, to better represent the people who took part in building them. This idea was put forth by Admiral Percy W. Nelles. Sponsors were commonly associated with the community for which the ship was named. Royal Navy corvettes were designed as open sea escorts, while Canadian corvettes were developed for coastal auxiliary roles which was exemplified by their minesweeping gear. Eventually the Canadian corvettes would be modified to allow them to perform better on the open seas.

== Construction ==
Brandon was ordered 22 January 1940 as part of the 1939–1940 Flower-class building program. She was laid down 10 October 1940 by Davie Shipbuilding and Repairing Co. Ltd. at Lauzon, Quebec and launched 29 April 1941. Brandon was commissioned at Quebec City on 22 July 1941. She had three refits during her career. The first took place at South Shields beginning in 1941 and taking three months to complete. The second refit took place at Grimsby in August 1943. The refit took three months to complete also and during this time, Brandon had her fo'c'sle extended. Her final refit took place at Liverpool in late 1944 and took two months to complete.

== War service ==
Brandon arrived at Halifax on 1 August 1941. In September, she was assigned to Newfoundland Command. She served as an ocean escort until December of that year before heading in for a refit. After working up at Tobermory, the chief training base for UK escorts, Brandon returned to ocean escort duty.

From mid-March 1942 until September 1944, Brandon was employed on the "Newfie" – Derry route, escorting convoys from one side of the Atlantic to the other. Brandon picked up 45 men off the British merchant Broompark that had been torpedoed and damaged on 25 July 1942 by German U-boat U-552 east of Newfoundland, Canada. After saving her crew, the Broompark eventually sank under tow. In December 1942, she was assigned to Mid-Ocean Escort Force (MOEF) escort group C-4. During her time with MOEF she took part in the battle for HX 224 in February 1943. In March, Brandon was temporarily assigned to escort convoys to Gibraltar. In August, she was sent in for another refit.

On 2 September 1944, Brandon escorted her last trans-Atlantic convoy before going in for her final refit and then work ups in Bermuda. In February 1945, Brandon joined Western Escort Force escort group EG-5. She served with this group until the end of the war.

== Post war service ==
Brandon was paid off 22 June 1945 at Sorel, Quebec. She was transferred to the War Assets Corporation and sold for scrapping on 5 October 1945. She was broken up in Hamilton later that year.
