= Leo Yaffe =

Canadian nuclear chemist

- Born: July 6, 1916; Devils Lake, North Dakota, U.S.
- Died: May 14, 1997 (aged 80); Montreal, Quebec, Canada
- Education: University of Manitoba; McGill University
- Awards: Order of Canada
- Scientific career
- Fields: Nuclear chemistry
- Workplaces: AECL; McGill University; IAEA; Chemical Institute of Canada

Leo Yaffe, OC FRSC (July 6, 1916 – May 14, 1997) was a Canadian nuclear chemistry scientist and a proponent of the peaceful uses of nuclear power.

Born in Devils Lake, North Dakota, his family moved to Winnipeg in 1920. He studied at the University of Manitoba receiving a B.Sc.(Hons) in 1940, a M.Sc. in 1941, and was awarded an honorary D.Sc. in 1982. He received a Ph.D. in 1943 from McGill University.

In 1943, he was recruited by Atomic Energy of Canada Limited to work at the Manhattan Project's Montreal Laboratory, moving to the Chalk River Laboratories, on the banks of the Ottawa River, in Ontario, at the end of the war. He remained with the AECL until 1952. His research group developed intense sources of the radioactive isotope cobalt-60 used for treatment of cancer, and radioactive tracers for medical diagnosis.

In 1952, he moved to McGill University, where he studied nuclear reactions using the J.S. Foster cyclotron had just been built at McGill. In 1958 he became the Macdonald Professor of Chemistry.

From 1963 to 1965 he was director of research at the International Atomic Energy Agency in Vienna. Returning to McGill he was appointed head of the department of chemistry until 1972. In 1974 he was appointed vice-principal (administration) which he held until he retired in 1981. From 1981 to 1982, he was the president of the Chemical Institute of Canada.

He married Betty Workman and has two children: Carla Krasnick, and Mark Yaffe. Yaffe died in Montreal in 1997. The McGill University Archives holds a collection of his personal papers and photographs.

== Honours ==
- Fellow, Royal Society of Canada, 1959
- Doctor of Letters, Trent University, 1980
- Officer, Order of Canada, 1988
- Prix Marie-Victorin, Prix du Québec, 1990

== Quotes ==
- "People, unfortunately, tend to equate nuclear with bombs. I'm a passionate believer in the peaceful purposes of nuclear energy. What people don't realize is how many people are being helped to surmount medical problems with nuclear medicine."
- "The transmission of knowledge from one generation to the next remains for me the most noble of the professions."
