= Lew Kowarski =

Russian-Polish-French physicist

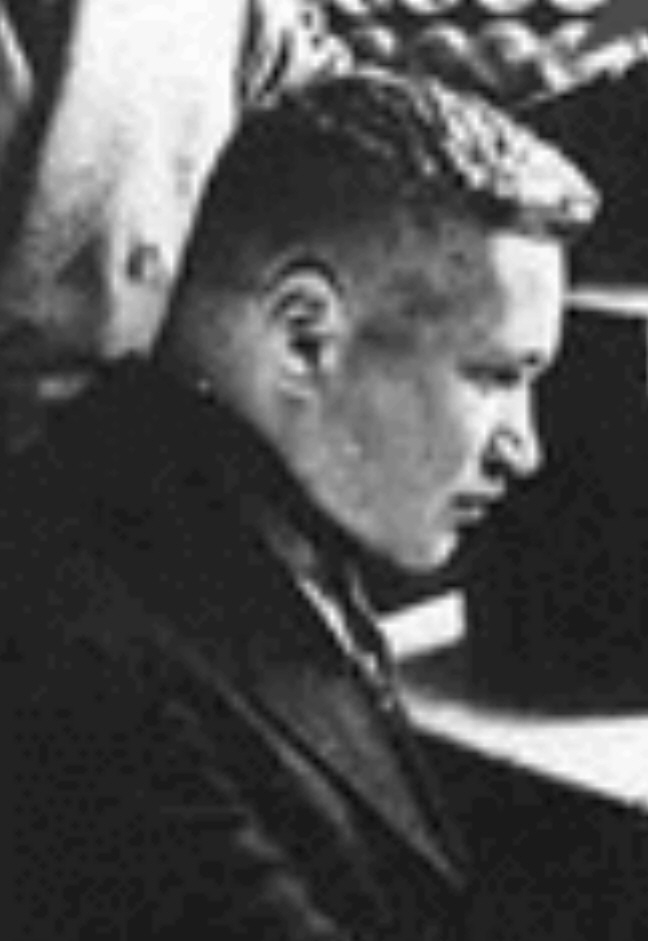
- Lew Kowarski in 1942
- Born: Lew Kowarski; 10 February 1907; Saint Petersburg, Russian Empire
- Died: 30 July 1979 (aged 72); Geneva, Switzerland
- Education: University of Lyon; University of Paris
- Scientific career
- Fields: Nuclear physics
- Workplaces: Cavendish Laboratory; CERN

Lew Kowarski (10 February 1907 – 30 July 1979) was a Russian-French physicist. He was a lesser-known but important contributor to nuclear science. He participated in the British Tube Alloys on early nuclear weapon research. After the war he worked at CERN.

== Early life ==
Lew Kowarski was born in 1907 in Saint Petersburg to Nicholas Kowarski, a businessman and the Ukrainian singer Olga Vlassenko. Following the Bolshevik Revolution, when Lew was 12 years old, his family fled west under adventurous circumstances and settled in Vilnius (then in Poland). During his youth, Lew was a talented musician and considered a music career; however, his fingers grew too large for the keyboard.

=== Education ===
He received a Chemical Engineering degree from the University of Lyon and an Sc.B. and Ph.D. from the University of Paris. His thesis on crystal growth was carried out in Jean Perrin's team, where he met Francis Perrin, Marie Curie and Irène Joliot-Curie.

== Research career ==
=== During World War II ===
He joined Frédéric Joliot-Curie's group in 1934, where Hans von Halban came in 1937. They established in 1939 the possibility of nuclear chain reactions and nuclear energy production. While doing their research, the events of World War II forced them to eventually move to England, bringing with them the world's entire stock of heavy water, given on loan by Norway to France so that it would not fall into German hands. They continued their research at the Cavendish Laboratory in Cambridge for the MAUD Committee, part of the wartime Tube Alloys project.

Just before the invasions, the records and papers of Frédéric Joliot, Hans von Halban and Lew Kowarski were smuggled out of France, and eventually to England. Included in this operation were 26 drums of heavy water, the world’s entire stock at the time. Some of the papers written by Halban and Kowarski were deposited at the Royal Society in the UK, where they were sealed with a note from James Chadwick, dated December 18, 1941, that said, “The paper is such that it would be inadvisable to publish it at the present time.” The papers described the outline of a design for a nuclear fission reactor.

Kowarski then worked in the Montreal Laboratory in Canada, but only after Halban had been replaced as Director by John Cockcroft, as he did not want to work under Halban. He supervised the construction of Canada's first nuclear reactor (ZEEP) at the Chalk River Laboratories in 1945.

=== Post war ===
He came back to France to supervise the first two French reactors in 1948 and 1952. A staff member of CERN (Geneva) since participating in its formation in 1953, he was a Decorated Officer Legion of Honor, Fellow of the American Nuclear Society, and a recipient of citation and prize from the U.S. Atomic Energy Commission. After his retirement in 1972, he was a university professor at Boston University, focusing on the interaction between Science and Mankind.

== Recently discovered documents ==
In 1940, James Chadwick forwarded the work of two French scientists, Hans von Halban and Kowarski, who worked in Cambridge, to the Royal Society. He asked that the papers be held, as they were not appropriate for publication during the war. In 2007, the Society discovered the documents during an audit of their archives. The documents describe how to control the chain reaction, describe the components of a nuclear reactor, and describe how to produce plutonium.

== See also ==
- Zoé (reactor), the first French nuclear reactor
- Frédéric Joliot-Curie
- Hans von Halban
- Montreal Laboratory
- Chalk River Laboratories
