= George Laurence =

Canadian nuclear physicist

- Born: 21 January 1905; Charlottetown, Prince Edward Island, Canada
- Died: 6 November 1987 (aged 82); Deep River, Ontario, Canada
- Education: Dalhousie University; Cambridge University; Imperial College London
- Known for: Development of nuclear energy and nuclear safety principles
- Scientific career
- Fields: Nuclear Physics
- Workplaces: Montreal Laboratory (ML); Chalk River Laboratories(CRL); United Nations Atomic Energy Commission (UNAEC); Atomic Energy Control Board
- Doctoral advisor: Ernest Rutherford
- Doctoral students: Ishfaq Ahmad

George Craig Laurence (21 January 1905 – 6 November 1987) was a Canadian nuclear physicist. He was educated at Dalhousie University, and at Cambridge University under Ernest Rutherford.

He was appointed as Radium and X-ray physicist to the Canadian National Research Council in 1930. In 1939–40 he attempted to build a graphite-uranium reactor in Ottawa, anticipating Enrico Fermi's work by several months. In 1942 he joined the Anglo-French nuclear research team at the Montreal Laboratory, where he was responsible for recruiting Canadian scientists. The laboratory later transferred to the Chalk River, and built the ZEEP Reactor, the first outside the U.S.A.

In 1946–47 he was in the Canadian delegation to the United Nations Atomic Energy Commission. He then returned to Montreal Laboratory and continued to carry out his research from 1950 to 1961. He was then at the Chalk River Laboratory, and was President of the Atomic Energy Control Board from 1961 to 1970.

Laurence Court, a street in Deep River, Ontario, is named in his honour.

== Publication ==
Early Years of Nuclear Energy Research in Canada by George C. Laurence

== Archives ==
There is a George Laurence fonds at Library and Archives Canada. Archival reference number is R15952.
