= Hans von Halban =

French physicist (1908–1964)

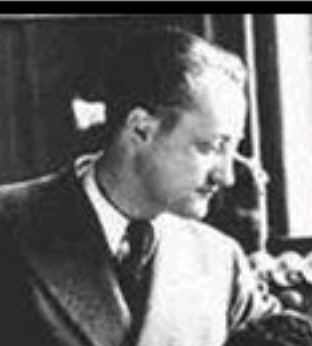
- Hans von Halban in 1942
- Born: 24 January 1908; Leipzig, Saxony, Germany
- Died: 28 November 1964 (aged 56); Paris, France
- Education: University of Zurich
- Spouses: Els Andriesse (divorced) Aline de Gunzbourg (divorced)
- Children: 3
- Scientific career
- Fields: Physics
- Doctoral advisor: Edgar Meyer

Hans Heinrich von Halban (24 January 1908 – 28 November 1964) was a French physicist of Austrian-Jewish descent.

== Family ==
He is a descendant of Polish Jews who left Kraków for Vienna in the 1850s on his father's side. His grandfather, Heinrich Blumenstock, was a senior official in the Habsburg Empire and was ennobled by Emperor Franz Joseph I in the 1880s, taking the name of Ritter Heinrich Blumenstock von Halban. The surname Blumenstock was subsequently dropped by the family, as was the use of 'von' after the Second World War. His mother's family was from Bohemia and his great-grandfather, Moritz von Fialka, was a colonel in the Austro-Prussian War of 1866.

Although converted to Catholicism, the family were never religiously observant. Hans Halban was a convinced secularist.

== Education and research ==
Hans Halban was born in Leipzig and later moved to Würzburg where his father, Hans von Halban Sr., became a professor of physical chemistry. He began his studies in physics in Frankfurt and finished his doctoral studies at the University of Zurich during the December of 1934.

For two years, he worked with Niels Bohr at the University of Copenhagen's Institute of Physics. In collaboration with Otto Frisch, he discovered that heavy water had very low neutron absorption compared to ordinary water.

In 1937, Halban was invited to join a team led by Frédéric Joliot-Curie at the Collège de France in Paris. Further members of this team also included Francis Perrin and Lew Kowarski. In 1939, the group measured the mean number of neutrons emitted during nuclear fission, and established the possibility of nuclear chain reactions and nuclear energy production. In August of the same year, the group showed that the rate of fission in uranium oxide was increased by immersion in ordinary water. Their research was made possible after the French government purchased 185 kg of heavy water from Norsk Hydro and secretly flew it to France.

== Second World War ==
With the German occupation of Paris in May 1940, Halban and Kowarski left Paris with the supply of heavy water, a gram of radium and the documentation of their research, as instructed by Joliot-Curie. He escaped France via Clermont-Ferrand and Bordeaux to England. He was invited by Churchill's government to continue his research at Cambridge University. In 1942, along with British and other European "refugee scientists", Halban was sent to Montreal as head of the research laboratories at the Montreal Laboratory, associated with but not part of the nascent Manhattan Project.

Halban's marriage to his first wife Els (née Andriesse, who later married the Czech physicist George Placzek) ended in divorce. In 1943, Halban married Aline Elisabeth Yvonne Strauss (née de Gunzbourg), who had escaped France in 1941 with her young son Michel. This marriage would also end in divorce, with Aline marrying the philosopher Isaiah Berlin in 1956.

Following the Liberation of Paris in August 1944, Halban visited London and Paris, where he saw Joliot-Curie for the first time since leaving France. Although he maintained that he did not divulge any nuclear secrets to Joliot-Curie, General Groves, the head of the Manhattan Project, had Halban removed from his job in Montreal, and replaced by John Cockcroft. Furthermore, Halban was not allowed to work or to leave North America for a year.

== Post-war ==
Halban was not invited back to the Collège de France after the war. Instead, he was invited back to England by Frederick Lindemann (Lord Cherwell) to lead a team at the Clarendon Laboratory at Oxford University, closely connected to the Atomic Energy Research Establishment (the Harwell Laboratory).

After eight years at Oxford, Halban was invited back to France in 1954 by Prime Minister Pierre Mendès-France to direct the building of a nuclear research laboratory at Saclay, outside Paris, which greatly expanded the French Commissariat à l'énergie atomique (Atomic Energy Commission). He took up the appointment in 1955 following his divorce from his wife Aline. The CEA Saclay laboratory developed the independent French nuclear bomb and oversaw the development of French civil nuclear energy.

== Last years ==
Due to worsening health, Halban was obliged to retire in 1961. He spent the last three years of his life in Paris and Crans-sur-Sierre, Switzerland, with his third wife, Micheline (née Lazard-Vernier).

He died on 28 November 1964 from complications following an unsuccessful heart operation at the American Hospital of Paris, leaving behind three children: Catherine Maud from his first marriage, and Pierre (Peter) and Philippe from his second. He is buried in Larchant, near Paris.

== Posthumously discovered documents ==
In 1940, James Chadwick forwarded the work of Halban and Lew Kowarski from Cambridge to the Royal Society. He asked that the papers be held as they were not appropriate for publication during the war. In 2007, the Society discovered the documents during an audit of their archives.

== See also ==
- Frédéric Joliot-Curie
- Lew Kowarski
- ZEEP
- Dési von Halban
