= Leslie H. Martin =

Australian physicist (1900–1983)

Sir Leslie Martin
- Born: 21 December 1900; Footscray, Victoria
- Died: 1 February 1983 (aged 82); Camberwell, Victoria
- Citizenship: Australian
- Education: University of Melbourne; University of Cambridge
- Awards: Commander of the Order of the British Empire (1954); Fellow of the Royal Society (1957); Knight Bachelor (1957)
- Scientific career
- Fields: Physics
- Workplaces: University of Melbourne; Australian Universities Commission; University of New South Wales
- Doctoral advisor: Ernest Rutherford
- Other academic advisors: T. H. Laby

Sir Leslie Harold Martin, CBE, FAA, FRS (21 December 1900 – 1 February 1983) was an Australian physicist. He was one of the 24 Founding Fellows of the Australian Academy of Science and had a significant influence on the structure of higher education in Australia as chairman of the Australian Universities Commission from 1959 until 1966. He was Professor of Physics at the University of Melbourne from 1945 to 1959, and Dean of the Faculty of Military Studies and Professor of Physics at the University of New South Wales at the Royal Military College, Duntroon, in Canberra from 1967 to 1970. He was the Defence Scientific Adviser and chairman of the Defence Research and Development Policy Committee from 1948 to 1968, and a member of the Australian Atomic Energy Commission from 1958 to 1968. In this role he was an official observer at several British nuclear weapons tests in Australia.

== Early life ==
Leslie Harold Martin was born in the Melbourne suburb of Footscray on 21 December 1900, to Henry Richard Martin, a railway worker, and his wife Esther (Ettie) Emily, née Tutty. He attended Flemington State School and won a Junior State Scholarship to Melbourne High School for his final years of secondary schooling in 1917 and 1918. His mathematics teacher, Miss Julia Flynn, encouraged him, and he won a Victorian Education Department Senior Government Scholarship in 1918.

He entered the University of Melbourne on the scholarship in 1919, to study for a Bachelor of Science for Education, with the intention of becoming a maths teacher. In 1921, in his final year, he came top of his year with first class honours in Natural Philosophy (physics) and was awarded the Dixson Scholarship in Natural Philosophy. In 1922, he completed his Master of Science degree, writing his master's thesis on "The emission of X Rays" under the supervision of Professor T. H. Laby. He was awarded first class honours and both the Dixson and Kernot Scholarships.

Martin was awarded the Fred Knight Research Scholarship in 1923, which allowed him to continue his research with Laby. He earned extra money as a demonstrator in the Department of Natural Philosophy, and he lectured in the evenings at the Working Men's College. Laby nominated him for an 1851 Research Fellowship and a free trip to England to study physics under Ernest Rutherford at the University of Cambridge's Cavendish laboratory.

Before departing, he married Gladys Maude Elaine Bull, a Bachelor of Music student at the University of Melbourne, at St James's Church of England in Ivanhoe on 13 February 1923. She did not complete her studies, but instead accompanied him to England, sailing on the SS Berrima. They had two sons; the first, Leon Henry Martin, born in Cambridge on 25 April 1924. When Gladys became pregnant again, she decided to return to Australia to be with her parents. Their second son, Raymond Leslie Martin, was born on 3 February 1926. Leon died on the return voyage to England on the SS Benalla in July 1926.

== Academic career ==
Martin enrolled at Trinity College, Cambridge, and continued his research into X-rays under Rutherford's supervision. He completed his PhD in 1926. The results of this work were published in the Proceedings of the Royal Society of London, and the Proceedings of the Cambridge Philosophical Society. He was awarded an International Research Fellowship by the Rockefeller Foundation, allowing him to stay on into 1927. He later recalled that:

John Cockcroft and I worked in the same room at the Cavendish Laboratory. We designed a half-million-volt accelerator tube which was used with a powerful Tesla to produce fast electrons. The electric field around the H.T. electrode produced magnificent coloured discharges in vacuum tubes. These fascinated Rutherford. He loved to edge closer to the H.T. electrode holding a vacuum tube at arm's length in an attempt to increase the brilliance of the electrical display. These visitations scared us. Cockcroft ultimately passed a spark to earth through a lump of meat, boring a hole half an inch in diameter. This impressed Rutherford, who liked the direct approach but his visits became less frequent.

Martin applied for a position as a lecturer at the University of Melbourne in January 1927. He was successful, and returned to Australia in August 1927. His corner of the Cavendish Laboratory was taken over by Ernest Walton. Martin continued his research into X-rays, working with Laby, J. C. Bower and F. F. H. Eggleston. He won the David Syme Research Prize in 1934, for his investigation of the Auger effect, the emission of electrons after ionisation by X-rays. Work with the chemical element xenon gave important confirmation of Paul Dirac's quantum field theory. In 1937 he became an associate professor in Natural Philosophy, and second-in-charge of the Natural Philosophy Department.

With the outbreak of the Second World War in September 1939, Martin commenced projects at the request of the Australian Defence Forces, investigating a proximity fuse for the Australian Army and an acoustic communications system for the Royal Australian Air Force (RAAF) that would allow an instructor and trainee pilot to converse with each other. He led a team that built a prototype Height and Range Finder No. 3, Mark IV, for the Army, but the Army cancelled the order in August 1941 when the prototype was nearly complete. In January 1942, he was seconded to the Council for Scientific and Industrial Research's Radiophysics Laboratory in Sydney to develop secret valves for a Radio Direction Finder. He teamed up with Eric Burhop to build a magnetron, producing a working prototype on 23 May 1942. He then went on to build an original magnetron that generated 25 centimetre microwave radiation. These magnetrons were used in radar equipment by the Army, RAAF, Royal Australian Navy (RAN), and United States Army Air Forces (USAAF). Wishing to return to Melbourne, he stepped down as Deputy Chief of the Division of Radiophysics in January 1944, and took charge of the Valve Laboratory at the University of Melbourne.

On 1 January 1945 he became Professor of Physics at the University of Melbourne vice Laby, a position he held until 1959. He built up a nuclear physics research school at a time when Australian universities were only just beginning to award PhDs, and most research students went abroad to pursue their studies. He attempted to equip it as best as his limited funds would allow. Wherever possible, equipment and parts were built by staff and students. His cosmic ray group participated in the 1947–48 Antarctic expedition of HMAS Wyatt Earp, and he designed and built a 200 kV neutron generator and a 1 MeV Van de Graaff generator. A 3 MeV betatron was converted an 18 MeV electron synchrotron in 1948. A 5 to 12 MeV cyclotron was the largest machine built at the university up to that time. Design work began in 1953, and it commenced operation in 1957, running until 1976. Martin did not have the money to build it, but managed to scrounge funding and components from various sources. Although he was an experimental physicist, he created a theoretical physics group under Courtney Mohr. He also managed to persuade the Commonwealth Scientific and Industrial Research Organisation (CSIRO) to transfer CSIRAC, Australia's first digital electronic computer, to the School of Physics in 1955, creating the first academic computing facility in Australia, and the beginning of computer science at the University of Melbourne.

== Other work ==
The Council for Scientific and Industrial Research created the Atomic Physics Section in 1947 led by Martin. In 1948 he became a member of the Interim Council of the Australian National University. He was president of the Australian Branch of the Institute of Physics in 1952 and 1953. From 1953 to 1963 he was a Trustee of the Science Museum of Victoria and its chairman in 1962 and 1963. He became a Foundation Fellow of the Australian Academy of Science in 1954 and was elected a Fellow of the Royal Society of London in 1957. For his work in education and defence he was made a Commander of the Order of the British Empire in the 1954 Birthday Honours, and he was knighted to honour his outstanding contributions to science in the 1957 New Year Honours. He was a Pro-Vice-Chancellor for the University of Melbourne in 1957.

Some of his many other posts included being the Defence Scientific Adviser and chairman of the Defence Research and Development Policy Committee from 1948 to 1968. He was present at the British Operation Hurricane nuclear test in the Monte Bello Islands off the coast of Western Australia in October 1952, and then for Operation Totem tests at Emu Field in South Australia in October 1953. When the British government established the Maralinga Test Range in 1953, the Australian government created the Maralinga Safety Committee, which became the Atomic Weapons Test Safety Committee, with Martin as its chairman. As such he was responsible for safety of the Operation Mosaic tests at Monte Bello in May and June 1956, and Operation Buffalo tests at Maralinga in September and October 1956, after which he handed over the chairmanship to Ernest Titterton. An advocate for the peaceful use atomic energy, Martin became a member of the Industrial Atomic Energy Policy Committee in 1949, and a member of the Scientific Advisory Committee of the Australian Atomic Energy Commission in 1953. In 1958 he was an Australian delegate to the United Nations conference on Atoms for Peace in Vienna. That year, he was appointed a member of the Australian Atomic Energy Commission, and was its deputy chairman when he retired in 1968.

Martin was the full-time chairman of the Australian Universities Commission from August 1959 until he retired in 1966. In this time he oversaw a rapid expansion of Australian higher education, including the commencement of five new universities. In 1961 he became chairman of the Committee on the Future Development of Tertiary Education in Australia, a position he held until 1965. The committee's advice led to a formalised "binary divide" between the universities, as research and teaching institutions, and other higher education teaching institutions, mostly colleges of advanced education.

The links between his academic activities and his defence activities led him to work for the establishment of the RAAF College at Point Cook as an affiliated college of the University of Melbourne in 1961. In 1967 he became the chairman of the government's Tertiary Education (Services' Cadet Colleges) Committee that began planning for the Australian Defence Force Academy (ADFA). During this year he also became Professor of Physics and the first Dean of the Faculty of Military Studies for the University of New South Wales, at the Royal Military College, Duntroon until he retired in 1971.

== Retirement ==
Martin retired in March 1971, stepping down as a director of IBM Australia Limited and as the chairman of the editorial council of Pergamon Press. He lived in Canberra for a while, but moved back to Melbourne to be near his four grandchildren. He suffered a stroke in 1979, but recovered. He died suddenly in Camberwell on 1 February 1983, and his remains were cremated. He was survived by his wife and son Raymond.

== LH Martin Institute ==
The University of Melbourne formed the LH Martin Institute on 30 August 2007. The institute is interdisciplinary and has as its key objectives:

- to train the next generation of leaders of Australia's tertiary education in the strategic management of their institutions;
- to provide a forum in which public policy makers, public and private sector institutions and national and international experts can explore, assess and anticipate the changing national and international environment in which tertiary education operates; and
- to support its educational programs with scholarship and research.

== Sir Leslie Martin Prize ==
In 1971 Duntroon established the Sir Leslie Martin Prize which has been awarded every year until 1985, and from then at ADFA since 1986. The prize is awarded for "distinguished performance by a First Year Officer Cadet in First Year Physics" from all streams, that is, all Physics, Engineering and Arts students who take Physics I.

== Publications ==
- The high frequency K series absorption spectrum of erbium. Royal Society of Victoria. Proceedings., 35 (1922), 164–169.
- (With E.C. Stoner) The absorption of x-rays. Proceedings of the Royal Society of London, A, 107 (1925), 312–331.
- Some measurements on the absorption of x-rays of long wave-length. Cambridge Philosophical Society. Proceedings., 23 (1927), 783–793.
- The efficiency of K series emission by K ionised atoms. Proceedings of the Royal Society of London, A, 115 (1927), 420–442.
- (With K.C. Lang) X-ray absorption coefficients in the range 0.3 to 2.0 Å. Proceedings of the Royal Society of London, A, 137 (1932), 199–216.
- (With K.C. Lang) The thermal conductivity of water. Physical Society, London. Proceedings., 45 (1933), 523–529.
- (With W.G. Kannuluik) Conduction of heat in powders. Proceedings of the Royal Society of London, A, 141 (1933), 144–158.
- (With W.G. Kannuluik) The thermal conductivity of some gases at 0 °C. Proceedings of the Royal Society of London, A, 144 (1934), 496–513.
- (With J.C. Bower and T.H. Laby) Ionization in gases by x-rays as shown by expansion chamber observations. Sydney. University. Cancer Research Committee. Journal., 6 (1934), 131–143.
- (With J.C. Bower and T.H. Laby) Auger effect in argon. Proceedings of the Royal Society of London, A, 148 (1935), 40–46.
- (With F.F.H. Eggleston) The Auger effect in xenon and krypton. Proceedings of the Royal Society of London, A, 158 (1937), 46–54.
- (With F.F.H. Eggleston) The angular distribution of photoelectrons from the K shell. Proceedings of the Royal Society of London, A, 162 (1937), 95–110.
- (With A.A. Townsend) The beta-ray spectrum of RaE. Proceedings of the Royal Society of London, A, 170 (1939), 190–205.
