= SWEEPNIK =

SWEEPNIK was a device designed by Otto Frisch that used a sweeping laser to follow bubble chamber tracks. It was later used to follow roads as an aid to the digitisation of maps.
