= British contribution to the Manhattan Project =

British contribution to the WWII atomic bomb project

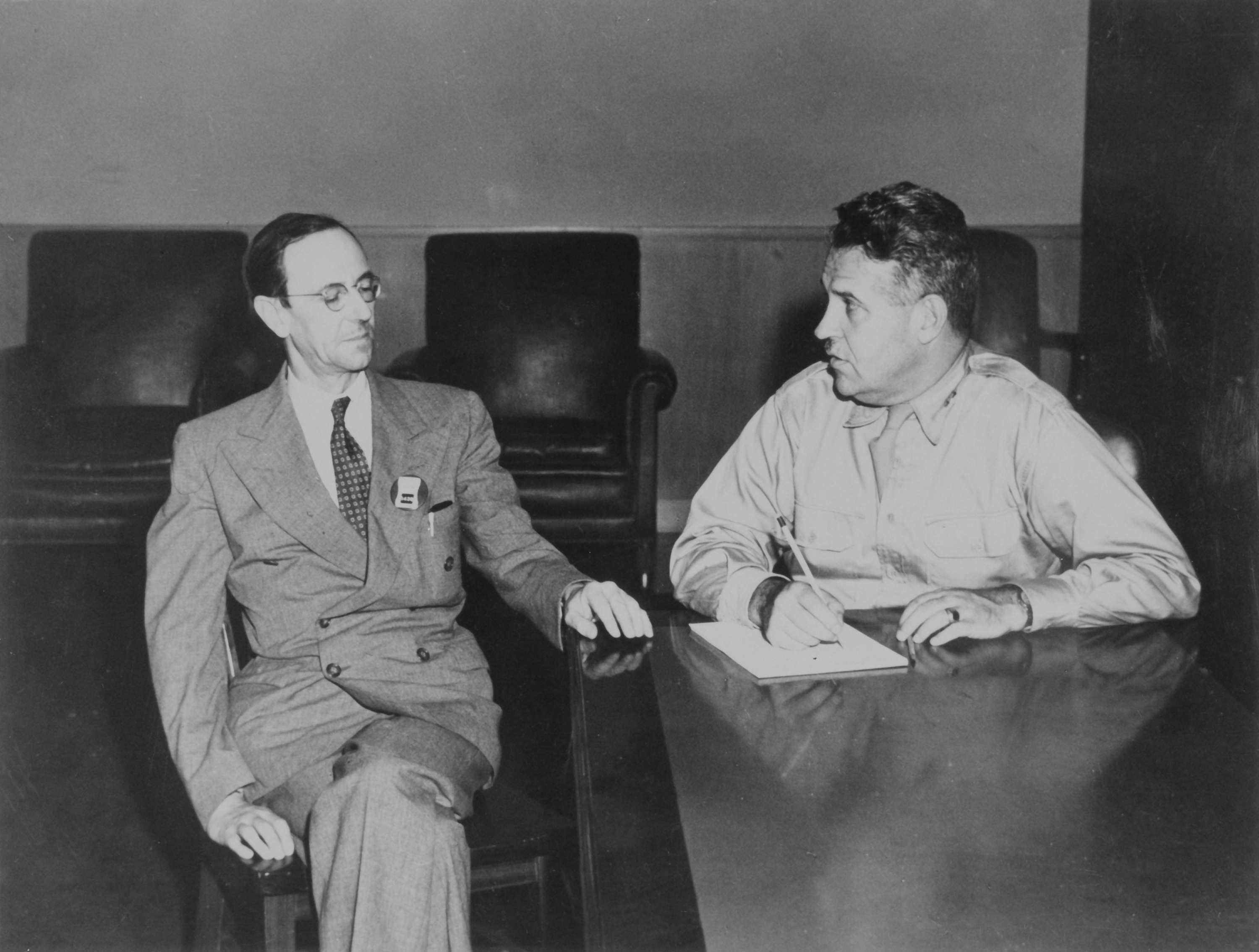
James Chadwick (left), the head of the British Mission, confers with Major General Leslie R. Groves Jr. (right), the director of the Manhattan Project.

Britain initiated the world's first research project to design an atomic bomb in 1941. Building on this work, Britain prompted the United States to recognise how important this type of research was, helped the U.S. to start the Manhattan Project in 1942, and supplied crucial expertise and materials that contributed to the project's successful completion in time to influence the end of the Second World War.

Following the discovery of nuclear fission in uranium, scientists Rudolf Peierls and Otto Frisch at the University of Birmingham calculated, in March 1940, that the critical mass of a metallic sphere of pure uranium-235 was as little as 1 to 10 kilograms (2.2 to 22.0 lb), and would explode with the power of thousands of tons of dynamite. The Frisch–Peierls memorandum prompted Britain to create an atomic bomb project, known as Tube Alloys. Mark Oliphant, an Australian physicist working in Britain, was instrumental in making the results of the British MAUD Report known in the United States in 1941 by a visit in person. Initially the British project was larger and more advanced, but after the United States entered the war, the American project soon outstripped and dwarfed its British counterpart. The British government then decided to shelve its own nuclear ambitions, and participate in the American project.

In August 1943, the prime minister of the United Kingdom, Winston Churchill, and the president of the United States, Franklin D. Roosevelt, signed the Quebec Agreement, which provided for cooperation between the two countries. The Quebec Agreement established the Combined Policy Committee and the Combined Development Trust to coordinate the efforts of the United States, the United Kingdom and Canada. The subsequent Hyde Park Agreement in September 1944 extended this cooperation to the postwar period. A British Mission led by Wallace Akers assisted in the development of gaseous diffusion technology in New York. Britain also produced the powdered nickel required by the gaseous diffusion process. Another mission, led by Oliphant who acted as deputy director at the Berkeley Radiation Laboratory, assisted with the electromagnetic separation process. As head of the British Mission to the Los Alamos Laboratory, James Chadwick led a multinational team of distinguished scientists that included Sir Geoffrey Taylor, James Tuck, Niels Bohr, Peierls, Frisch, and Klaus Fuchs, who was later revealed to be a Soviet atomic spy. Four members of the British Mission became group leaders at Los Alamos. William Penney observed the bombing of Nagasaki and participated in the Operation Crossroads nuclear tests in 1946.

Cooperation ended with the Atomic Energy Act of 1946, known as the McMahon Act, and Ernest Titterton, the last British government employee, left Los Alamos on 12 April 1947. Britain then proceeded with High Explosive Research, its own nuclear weapons programme, and became the third country to test an independently developed nuclear weapon in October 1952.

== Background ==
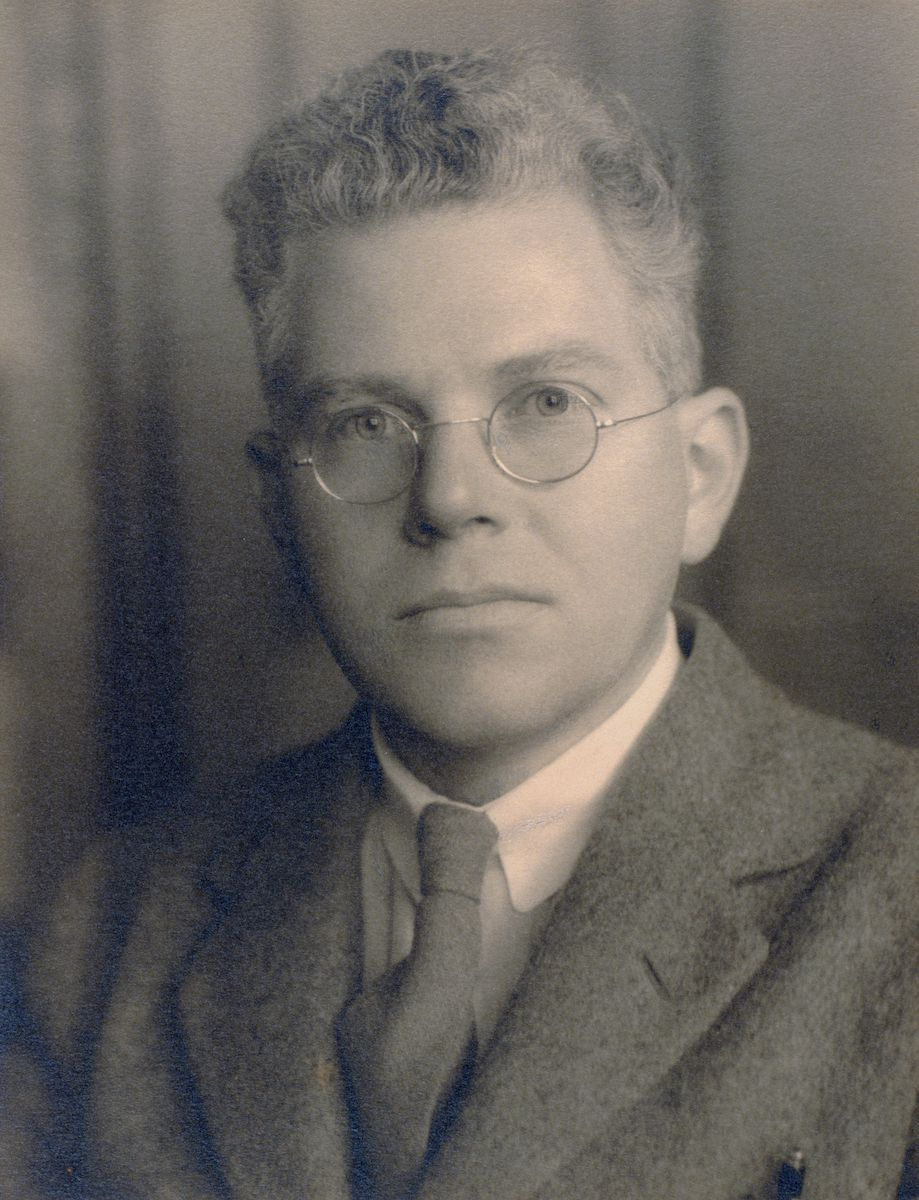
Australian physicist Mark Oliphant was a key figure in the launching of both the British and United States nuclear weapons programmes.

The 1938 discovery of nuclear fission in uranium by Otto Robert Frisch, Fritz Strassmann, Lise Meitner and Otto Hahn, raised the possibility that an extremely powerful atomic bomb could be created. Refugees from Nazi Germany and other fascist countries were particularly alarmed by the notion of a German nuclear weapon project. In the United States, three of them, Leo Szilard, Eugene Wigner and Albert Einstein, were moved to write the Einstein–Szilárd letter to the President of the United States, Franklin D. Roosevelt, warning of the danger. This led to the President creating the Advisory Committee on Uranium. In Britain, Nobel Prize in Physics laureates George Paget Thomson and William Lawrence Bragg were sufficiently concerned to take up the matter. Their concerns reached the Secretary of the Committee of Imperial Defence, Major General Hastings Ismay, who consulted with Sir Henry Tizard. Like many scientists, Tizard was sceptical of the likelihood of an atomic bomb being developed, reckoning the odds against success at 100,000 to 1.

Even at such long odds, the danger was sufficiently great to be taken seriously. Thomson, at Imperial College London, and Mark Oliphant, an Australian physicist at the University of Birmingham, were tasked with carrying out a series of experiments on uranium. By February 1940, Thomson's team had failed to create a chain reaction in natural uranium, and he had decided that it was not worth pursuing. But at Birmingham, Oliphant's team had reached a strikingly different conclusion. Oliphant had delegated the task to two German refugee scientists, Rudolf Peierls and Otto Frisch, who could not work on the university's radar project because they were enemy aliens and therefore lacked the necessary security clearance. They calculated the critical mass of a metallic sphere of pure uranium-235, the only fissile isotope found in significant quantity in nature, and found that instead of tons, as everyone had assumed, as little as 1 to 10 kilograms (2.2 to 22.0 lb) would suffice, which would explode with the power of thousands of tons of dynamite.

Oliphant took the Frisch–Peierls memorandum to Tizard, and the MAUD Committee was established to investigate further. It directed an intensive research effort, and in July 1941, produced two comprehensive reports that reached the conclusion that an atomic bomb was not only technically feasible, but could be produced before the war ended, perhaps in as little as two years. The Committee unanimously recommended pursuing the development of an atomic bomb as a matter of urgency, although it recognised that the resources required might be beyond those available to Britain. A new directorate known as Tube Alloys was created to coordinate this effort. Sir John Anderson, the Lord President of the Council, became the minister responsible, and Wallace Akers from Imperial Chemical Industries (ICI) was appointed the director of Tube Alloys.

== Contribution ==
=== Early Anglo-American cooperation ===
In July 1940, Britain had offered to give the United States access to its scientific research, and the Tizard Mission's John Cockcroft briefed American scientists on British developments. He discovered that the American project was smaller than the British, and not as far advanced. As part of the scientific exchange, the Maud Committee's findings were conveyed to the United States. Oliphant, one of the Maud Committee's members, flew to the United States in late August 1941, and discovered that vital information had not reached key American physicists. He met the Uranium Committee, and visited Berkeley, California, where he spoke persuasively to Ernest O. Lawrence, who was sufficiently impressed to commence his own research into uranium at the Berkeley Radiation Laboratory. Lawrence in turn spoke to James B. Conant, Arthur H. Compton and George B. Pegram. Oliphant's mission was a success; key American physicists became aware of the potential power of an atomic bomb. Armed with British data, Vannevar Bush, the director of the Office of Scientific Research and Development (OSRD), briefed Roosevelt and Vice President Henry A. Wallace in a meeting at the White House on 9 October 1941.

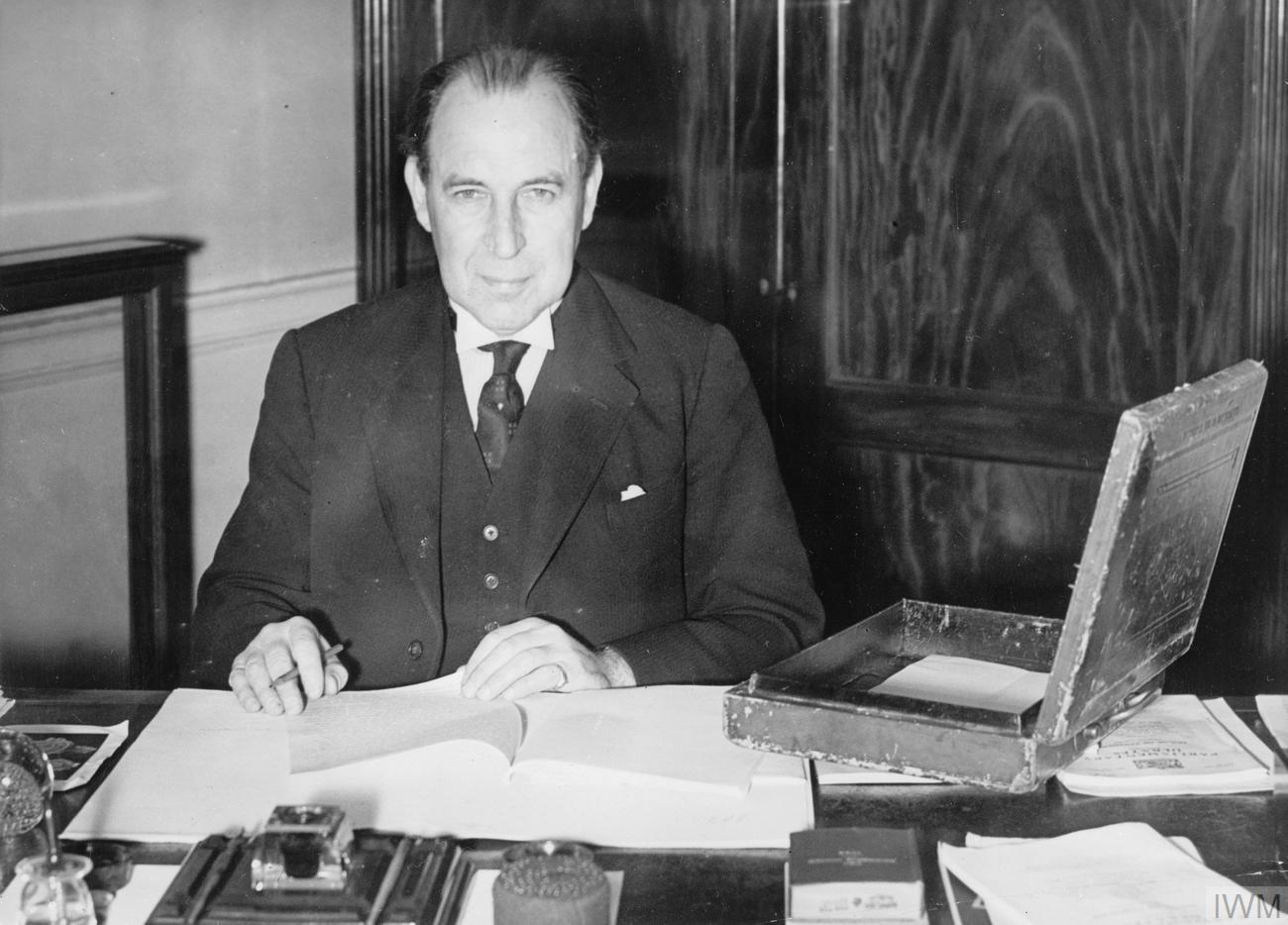
Sir John Anderson, minister responsible for Tube Alloys

The British and Americans exchanged nuclear information, but did not initially combine their efforts. British officials did not reply to an August 1941 offer by Bush and Conant to create a combined British and American project. In November 1941, Frederick L. Hovde, the head of the London liaison office of OSRD, raised the issue of cooperation and exchange of information with Anderson and Lord Cherwell, who demurred, ostensibly over concerns about American security. Ironically, it was the British project that had already been penetrated by atomic spies for the Soviet Union.

Yet the United Kingdom did not have the manpower or resources of the United States, and despite its early and promising start, Tube Alloys fell behind its American counterpart and was dwarfed by it. Britain was spending around £430,000 per year on research and development, and Metropolitan-Vickers was building gaseous diffusion units for uranium enrichment worth £150,000; but the Manhattan Project was spending £8,750,000 on research and development, and had let construction contracts worth £100,000,000 at the fixed wartime rate of four dollars to the pound. On 30 July 1942, Anderson advised the prime minister of the United Kingdom, Winston Churchill, that: "We must face the fact that ... [our] pioneering work ... is a dwindling asset and that, unless we capitalise it quickly, we shall be outstripped. We now have a real contribution to make to a 'merger.' Soon we shall have little or none."

By then, the positions of the two countries had reversed from what they were in 1941. The Americans had become suspicious that the British were seeking commercial advantages after the war, and Brigadier General Leslie R. Groves Jr., who took over command of the Manhattan Project on 23 September 1942, wanted to tighten security with a policy of strict compartmentalisation similar to the one that the British had imposed on radar. American officials decided that the United States no longer needed outside help. The Secretary of War, Henry L. Stimson, felt that since the United States was doing "ninety percent of the work" on the bomb, it would be "better for us to go along for the present without sharing anything more than we could help". In December 1942, Roosevelt agreed to restricting the flow of information to what Britain could use during the war, even if doing so slowed down the American project. In retaliation, the British stopped sending information and scientists to America, and the Americans then stopped all information sharing.

The British considered how they would produce a bomb without American help. A gaseous diffusion plant to produce 1 kilogram (2.2 lb) of weapons-grade uranium per day was estimated to cost up to £3,000,000 in research and development, and anything up to £50,000,000 to build in wartime Britain. A nuclear reactor to produce 1 kilogram (2.2 lb) of plutonium per day would have to be built in Canada. It would take up to five years to build and cost £5,000,000. The project would also require facilities for producing the required heavy water for the reactor costing between £5,000,000 and £10,000,000, and for producing uranium metal £1,500,000. The project would need overwhelming priority, as it was estimated to require 20,000 workers, many of them highly skilled, 500,000 tons of steel, and 500,000 kW of electricity. Disruption to other wartime projects would be inevitable, and it was unlikely to be ready in time to affect the outcome of the war in Europe. The unanimous response was that before embarking on this, another effort should be made to obtain American cooperation.

=== Cooperation resumes ===
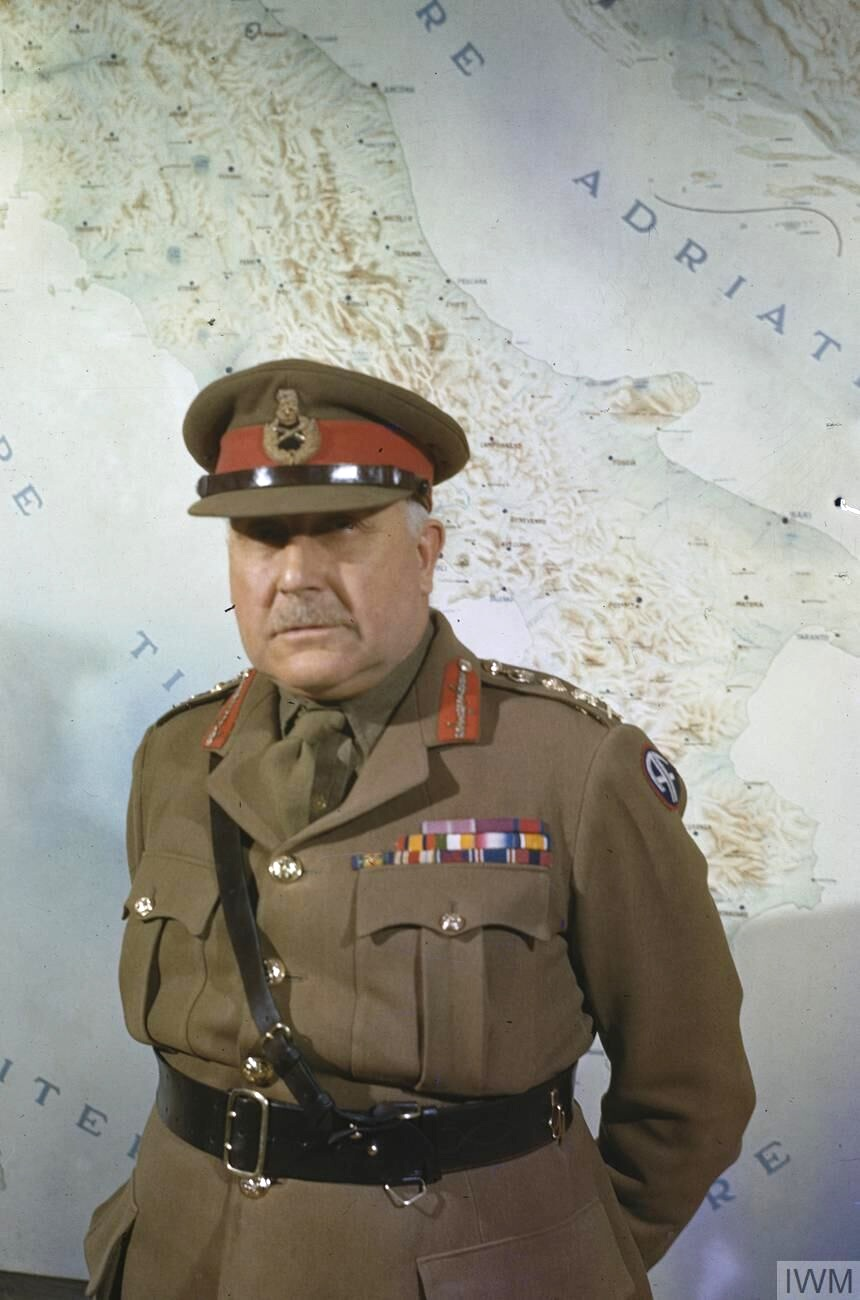
Field Marshal Sir Henry Maitland Wilson, a British representative on the Combined Policy Committee

By March 1943 Conant decided that British help would benefit some areas of the project. In particular, the Manhattan Project could benefit enough from assistance from James Chadwick, the discoverer of the neutron, and several other British scientists to warrant the risk of revealing weapon design secrets. Bush, Conant and Groves wanted Chadwick and Peierls to discuss bomb design with Robert Oppenheimer, and Kellogg still wanted British comments on the design of the gaseous diffusion plant.

Churchill took up the matter with Roosevelt at the Washington Conference on 25 May 1943, and Churchill thought that Roosevelt gave the reassurances he sought; but there was no follow-up. Bush, Stimson and William Bundy met Churchill, Cherwell and Anderson at 10 Downing Street in London. None of them was aware that Roosevelt had already made his decision, writing to Bush on 20 July 1943 with instructions to "renew, in an inclusive manner, the full exchange with the British Government regarding Tube Alloys."

Stimson, who had just finished a series of arguments with the British about the need for an invasion of France, was reluctant to appear to disagree with them about everything, and spoke in conciliatory terms about the need for good post-war relations between the two countries. For his part, Churchill disavowed interest in the commercial applications of nuclear technology. The reason for British concern about the post-war cooperation, Cherwell explained, was not commercial concerns, but so that Britain would have nuclear weapons after the war. Anderson then drafted an agreement for full interchange, which Churchill re-worded "in more majestic language". News arrived in London of Roosevelt's decision on 27 July, and Anderson was dispatched to Washington with the draft agreement. Churchill and Roosevelt signed what became known as the Quebec Agreement at the Quebec Conference on 19 August 1943.

The Quebec Agreement established the Combined Policy Committee to coordinate the efforts of the United States, United Kingdom and Canada. Stimson, Bush and Conant served as the American members of the Combined Policy Committee, Field Marshal Sir John Dill and Colonel J. J. Llewellin were the British members, and C. D. Howe was the Canadian member. Llewellin returned to the United Kingdom at the end of 1943 and was replaced on the committee by Sir Ronald Ian Campbell, who in turn was replaced by the British Ambassador to the United States, Lord Halifax, in early 1945. Dill died in Washington, D.C., in November 1944 and was replaced both as Chief of the British Joint Staff Mission and as a member of the Combined Policy Committee by Field Marshal Sir Henry Maitland Wilson.

Even before the Quebec Agreement was signed, Akers had already cabled London with instructions that Chadwick, Peierls, Oliphant and Francis Simon should leave immediately for North America. They arrived on 19 August, the day it was signed, expecting to be able to talk to American scientists, but were unable to do so. Two weeks would pass before American officials learnt of the contents of the Quebec Agreement. Over the next two years, the Combined Policy Committee met only eight times.

The first occasion was on 8 September 1943, on the afternoon after Stimson discovered that he was the chairman. The first meeting established a Technical Subcommittee chaired by Major General Wilhelm D. Styer. Because the Americans did not want Akers on the Technical Subcommittee due to his ICI background, Llewellin nominated Chadwick, whom he also wanted to be Head of the British Mission to the Manhattan Project. The other members were Richard C. Tolman, who was Groves's scientific adviser, and C. J. Mackenzie, the president of the Canadian National Research Council. It was agreed that the Technical Committee could act without consulting the Combined Policy Committee whenever its decision was unanimous. The Technical Subcommittee held its first meeting on 10 September, but negotiations dragged on. The Combined Policy Committee ratified the proposals in December 1943, by which time several British scientists had already commenced working on the Manhattan Project in the United States.

There remained the issue of cooperation between the Manhattan's Project's Metallurgical Laboratory in Chicago and the Montreal Laboratory. At the Combined Policy Committee meeting on 17 February 1944, Chadwick pressed for resources to build a nuclear reactor at what is now known as the Chalk River Laboratories. Britain and Canada agreed to pay the cost of this project, but the United States had to supply the heavy water. At that time, the United States controlled, by a supply contract, the only major production site on the continent, that of the Consolidated Mining and Smelting Company at Trail, British Columbia. Given that it was unlikely to have any impact on the war, Conant in particular was cool about the proposal, but heavy water reactors were of great interest. Groves was willing to support the effort and supply the heavy water required, but with certain restrictions. The Montreal Laboratory would have access to data from the research reactors at Argonne and the X-10 Graphite Reactor at Oak Ridge, but not from the production reactors at the Hanford Site; nor would they be given any information about plutonium. This arrangement was formally approved by the Combined Policy Committee meeting on 19 September 1944. The Canadian ZEEP (Zero Energy Experimental Pile) reactor went critical on 5 September 1945.

Chadwick supported British involvement in the Manhattan Project to the fullest extent, abandoning any hopes of a British project during the war. With Churchill's backing, he attempted to ensure that every request from Groves for assistance was honoured. While the pace of research was easing as the war entered its final phase, these scientists were still in great demand, and it fell to Anderson, Cherwell and Sir Edward Appleton, the Permanent Secretary of the Department of Scientific and Industrial Research, which was responsible for Tube Alloys, to prise them away from the wartime projects in which they were invariably engaged.

The September 1944 Hyde Park Agreement extended both commercial and military cooperation into the post-war period. The Quebec Agreement specified that nuclear weapons would not be used against another country without mutual consent. On 4 July 1945, Wilson agreed that the use of nuclear weapons against Japan would be recorded as a decision of the Combined Policy Committee.

=== Gaseous diffusion project ===
Tube Alloys made its greatest advances in gaseous diffusion technology, and Chadwick had originally hoped that the pilot plant at least would be built in Britain. Gaseous diffusion technology was devised by Simon and three expatriates, Nicholas Kurti from Hungary, Heinrich Kuhn from Germany, and Henry Arms from the United States, at the Clarendon Laboratory in 1940. The prototype gaseous diffusion equipment, two two-stage models and two ten-stage models, was manufactured by Metropolitan-Vickers at a cost of £150,000 for the four units. Two single-stage machines were later added. Delays in delivery meant that experiments with the single-stage machine did not commence until June 1943, and with the two-stage machine until August 1943. The two ten-stage machines were delivered in August and November 1943, but by this time the research programme they had been built for had been overtaken by events.

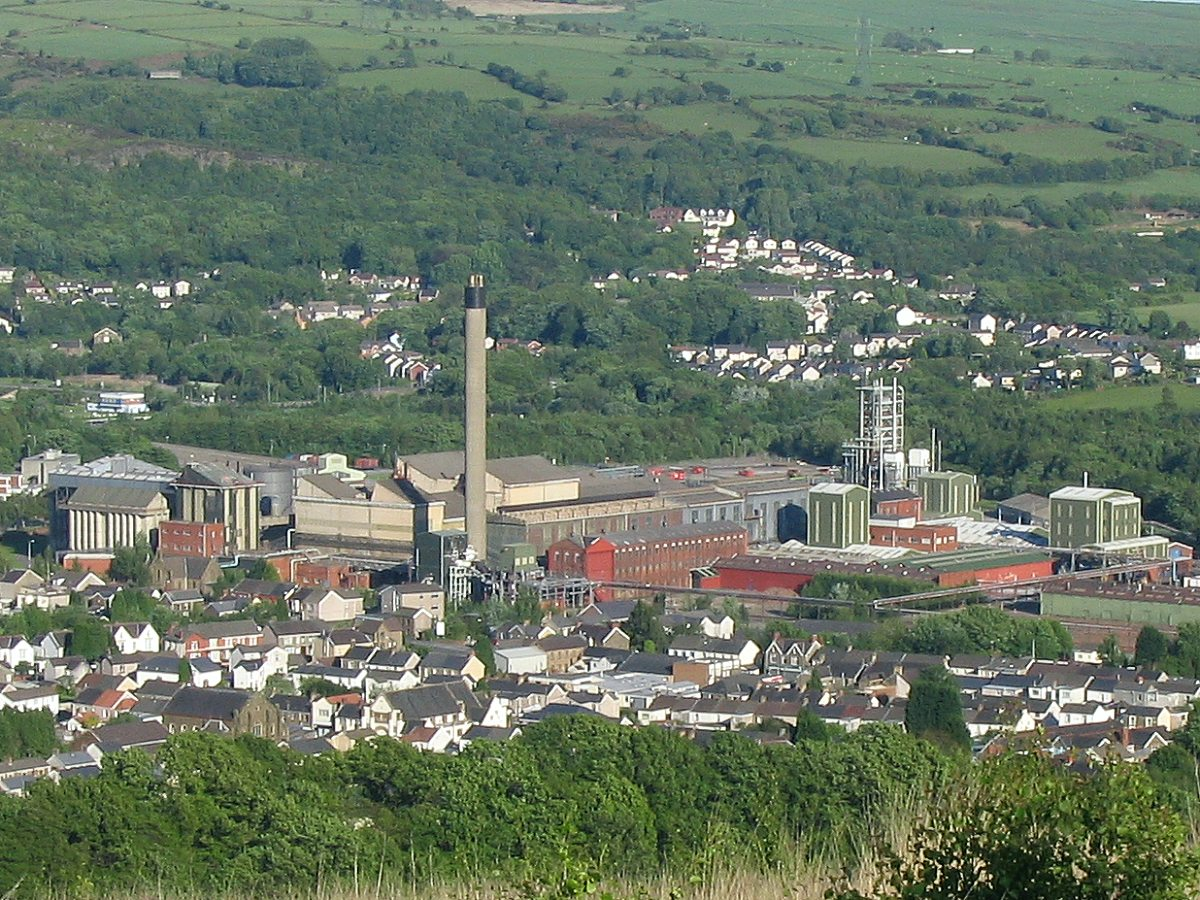
The Clydach Refinery in Wales, seen in 2006, supplied the Manhattan Project with nickel powder under Reverse Lend-Lease.

The Quebec Agreement allowed Simon and Peierls to meet with representatives of Kellex, who were designing and building the American gaseous diffusion plant, Union Carbide and Carbon, who would operate it, and Harold Urey's Substitute Alloy Materials (SAM) Laboratories at Columbia University, the Manhattan Project's centre tasked with research and development of the process. The year's loss of cooperation cost the Manhattan Project dearly. The corporations were committed to tight schedules, and the engineers were unable to incorporate British proposals that would involve major changes. Nor would it be possible to build a second plant. Nonetheless, the Americans were still eager for British assistance, and Groves asked for a British mission to be sent to assist the gaseous diffusion project. In the meantime, Simon and Peierls were attached to Kellex.

The British mission consisting of Akers and fifteen British experts arrived in December 1943. This was a critical time. Severe problems had been encountered with the Norris-Adler barrier. Nickel powder and electro-deposited nickel mesh diffusion barriers were pioneered by American chemist Edward Adler and British interior decorator Edward Norris at the SAM Laboratories. A decision had to be made whether to persevere with it or switch to a powdered nickel barrier based upon British technology that had been developed by Kellex. Up to this point, both were under development. The SAM Laboratory had 700 people working on gaseous diffusion and Kellex had about 900. The British experts conducted a thorough review, and agreed that the Kellex barrier was superior, but felt that it would be unlikely to be ready in time. Kellex's technical director, Percival C. Keith, disagreed, arguing that his company could get it ready and produce it more quickly than the Norris-Adler barrier. Groves listened to the British experts before he formally adopted the Kellex barrier on 5 January 1944.

The United States Army assumed responsibility for procuring sufficient quantities of the right type of powdered nickel. In this, the British were able to help. The only company that manufactured it was the Mond Nickel Company at Clydach in Wales. By the end of June 1945, it had supplied the Manhattan Project with 5,000 long tons (5,100 t) of nickel powder, paid for by the British government and supplied to the United States under Reverse Lend-Lease.

The Americans planned to have the K-25 plant in full production by June or July 1945. Having taken two years to get the prototype stages working, the British experts regarded this as incredibly optimistic, and felt that, barring a miracle, it would be unlikely to reach that point before the end of 1946. This opinion offended their American counterparts and dampened the enthusiasm for cooperation, and the British mission returned to the United Kingdom in January 1944. Armed with the British Mission's report, Chadwick and Oliphant were able to persuade Groves to reduce K-25's enrichment target; the output of K-25 would be enriched to weapons grade by being fed into the electromagnetic plant. Despite the British Mission's pessimistic forecasts, K-25 was producing enriched uranium in June 1945.

After the rest of the mission departed, Peierls, Kurti and Fuchs remained in New York, where they worked with Kellex. They were joined there by Tony Skyrme and Frank Kearton, who arrived in March 1944. Kurti returned to England in April 1944 and Kearton in September. Peierls moved on to the Los Alamos Laboratory in February 1944; Skyrme followed in July, and Fuchs in August.

=== Electromagnetic project ===
On 26 May 1943, Oliphant wrote to Appleton to say that he had been considering the problem of electromagnetic isotope separation, and believed that he had devised a better method than Lawrence's, one which would result in a five to tenfold improvement in efficiency, and make it more practical to use the process in Britain. His proposal was reviewed by Akers, Chadwick, Peierls and Simon, who agreed that it was sound. While the majority of scientific opinion in Britain favoured the gaseous diffusion method, there was still a possibility that electromagnetic separation might be useful as a final stage in the enrichment process, taking uranium that had already been enriched to 50 per cent by the gaseous process, and enriching it to pure uranium-235. Accordingly, Oliphant was released from the radar project to work on Tube Alloys, conducting experiments on his method at the University of Birmingham.

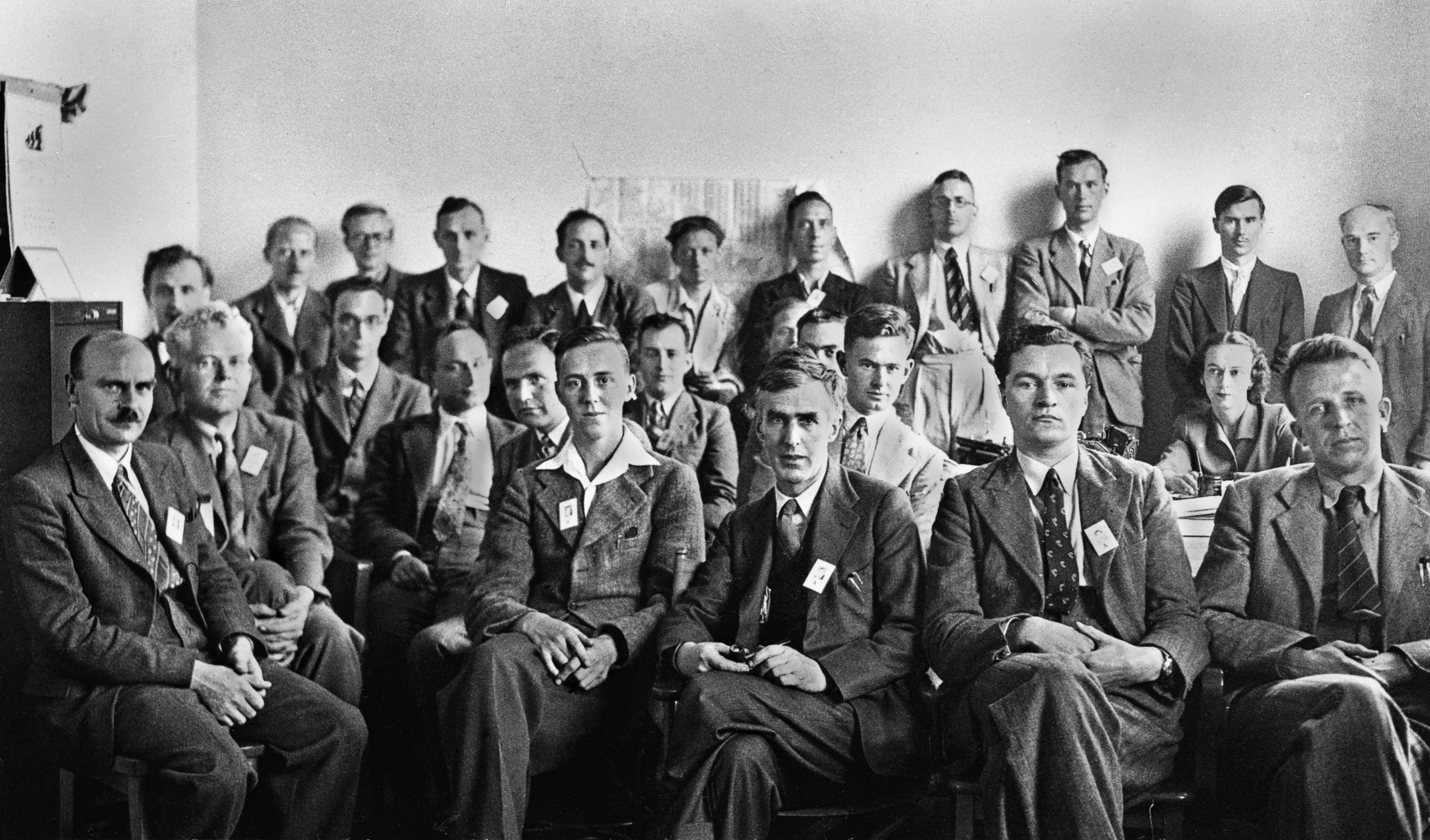
Group photograph of members of the Mark Oliphant Group of the Manhattan Project. Left to right seated: Harrie Massey, Mark Oliphant, R.H.V. Dawton, Eric Burhop, J.P. Keene, George Page, H.W.B. Skinner,Samuel Curran (mostly obscured behind Watt), C.S. Watt (mostly obscured behind Williams), R.M. Williams, S. Rowlands, Jean A. Sutherland, and M.J. Moore. Left to right standing: S.M. Duke, H.J. Morris, Maurice Wilkins, P.P. Starling, M.E. Haine, D.F Stanley, M.P. Edwards, J.D. Craggs, J. Sayer, W.D. Allen,Thomas Allibone.

Oliphant met Groves and Oppenheimer in Washington, D.C., on 18 September 1943, and they attempted to persuade him to join the Los Alamos Laboratory, but Oliphant felt that he would be of more use assisting Lawrence on the electromagnetic project. Accordingly, the Technical Subcommittee directed that Oliphant and six assistants would go to Berkeley, and later move on to Los Alamos. Oliphant found that he and Lawrence had quite different designs, and that the American one was frozen, but Lawrence, who had expressed a desire for Oliphant to join him on the electromagnetic project as early as 1942, was eager for Oliphant's assistance.

Oliphant secured the services of a fellow Australian physicist, Harrie Massey, who had been working for the Admiralty on magnetic mines, along with James Stayers and Stanley Duke, who had worked with him on the cavity magnetron. This initial group set out for Berkeley in a B-24 Liberator bomber in November 1943. Oliphant found that Berkeley had shortages of key skills, particularly physicists, chemists and engineers. He prevailed on Sir David Rivett, the head of the Council for Scientific and Industrial Research in Australia, to release Eric Burhop to work on the project. His requests for personnel were met, and the British mission at Berkeley grew in number to 35, two of whom, Robin Williams and George Page, were New Zealanders.

Members of the British mission occupied several key positions in the electromagnetic project. Oliphant became Lawrence's de facto deputy, and was in charge of the Berkeley Radiation Laboratory when Lawrence was absent. His enthusiasm for the electromagnetic project was rivalled only by Lawrence's, and his involvement went beyond scientific problems, extending to policy questions such as whether to expand the electromagnetic plant, although in this he was unsuccessful. The British chemists made important contributions, particularly Harry Emeléus and Philip Baxter, a chemist who had been research manager at ICI, was sent to the Manhattan Project's Clinton Engineering Works at Oak Ridge, Tennessee, in 1944 in response to a request for assistance with uranium chemistry, and became personal assistant to the general manager. His status as an ICI employee was of no concern to Groves. The British mission was given complete access to the electromagnetic project, both in Berkeley and at the Y-12 electromagnetic separation plant in Oak Ridge. While some of the British mission remained at Berkeley or Oak Ridge only for a few weeks, most stayed until the end of the war. Oliphant returned to Britain in March 1945, and was replaced as head of the British mission in Berkeley by Massey.

=== Los Alamos Laboratory ===
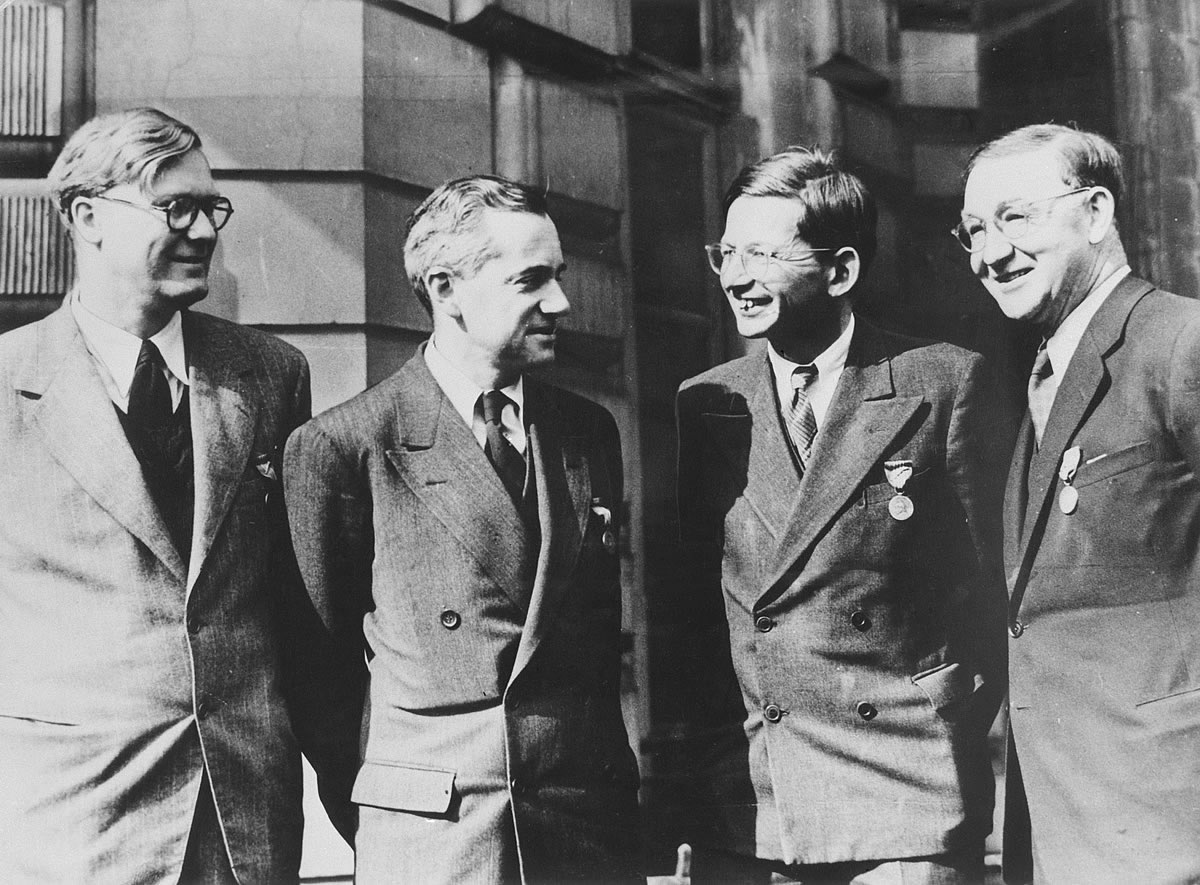
William Penney, Otto Frisch, Rudolf Peierls and John Cockcroft wearing the Medals of Freedom awarded for their services to the Manhattan Project

When cooperation resumed in September 1943, Groves and Oppenheimer revealed the existence of the Los Alamos Laboratory to Chadwick, Peierls and Oliphant. Oppenheimer wanted all three to proceed to Los Alamos as soon as possible, but it was decided that Oliphant would go to Berkeley to work on the electromagnetic process and Peierls would go to New York to work on the gaseous diffusion process. The task then fell to Chadwick. The original idea, favoured by Groves, was that the British scientists would work as a group under Chadwick, who would farm out work to them. This was soon discarded in favour of having the British Mission fully integrated into the laboratory. They worked in most of its divisions, only being excluded from plutonium chemistry and metallurgy.

First to arrive was Otto Frisch and Ernest Titterton and his wife Peggy, who reached Los Alamos on 13 December 1943. At Los Alamos Frisch continued his work on critical mass studies, for which Titterton developed electronic circuitry for high voltage generators, X-ray generators, timers and firing circuits. Peggy Titterton, a trained physics and metallurgy laboratory assistant, was one of the few women working at Los Alamos in a technical role. Chadwick arrived on 12 January 1944, but only stayed for a few months before returning to Washington, D.C.

When Oppenheimer appointed Hans Bethe as the head of the laboratory's prestigious Theoretical (T) Division, he offended Edward Teller, who was given his own group, tasked with investigating Teller's "Super" bomb, and eventually assigned to Enrico Fermi's F Division. Oppenheimer then wrote to Groves requesting that Peierls be sent to take Teller's place in T Division. Peierls arrived from New York on 8 February 1944, and subsequently succeeded Chadwick as head of the British Mission at Los Alamos. Egon Bretscher worked in Teller's Super group, as did Anthony French, who later recalled that "never at any time did I have anything to do with the fission bomb once I went to Los Alamos." Four members of the British Mission became group leaders: Bretscher (Super Experimentation), Frisch (Critical Assemblies and Nuclear Specifications), Peierls (Implosion Hydrodynamics) and George Placzek (Composite Weapon).

Niels Bohr and his son Aage, a physicist who acted as his father's assistant, arrived on 30 December on the first of several visits as a consultant. Bohr and his family had escaped from occupied Denmark to Sweden. A De Havilland Mosquito bomber brought him to England where he joined Tube Alloys. In America, he was able to visit Oak Ridge and Los Alamos, where he found many of his former students. Bohr acted as a critic, a facilitator and a role model for younger scientists. He arrived at a critical time, and several nuclear fission studies and experiments were conducted at his instigation. He played an important role in the development of the uranium tamper, and in the design and adoption of the modulated neutron initiator. His presence boosted morale, and helped improve the administration of the laboratory to strengthen ties with the Army.

Nuclear physicists knew about fission, but not the hydrodynamics of conventional explosions. As a result, there were two additions to the team that made significant contributions in this area of physics. First was James Tuck whose field of expertise was in shaped charges used in anti tank weapons for armour piercing. In terms of the plutonium bomb the scientists at Los Alamos were trying to wrestle with the idea of the implosion issue. Tuck was sent to Los Alamos in April 1944 and used a radical concept of explosive lensing which was then put into place. Tuck also designed the Urchin initiator for the bomb working closely with Seth Neddermeyer. This work was crucial to the success of the plutonium atomic bomb: Italian-American scientist Bruno Rossi later stated that without Tuck's work the plutonium bomb could not have exploded in August 1945. The other was Sir Geoffrey Taylor, an important consultant who arrived a month later to also work on the issue. Taylor's presence was desired so much at Los Alamos, Chadwick informed London, "that anything short of kidnapping would be justified". He was sent, and provided crucial insights into the Rayleigh–Taylor instability. The acute need for scientists with an understanding of explosives also led Chadwick to obtain the release of William Penney from the Admiralty, and William Marley from the Road Research Laboratory. Peierls and Fuchs worked on the hydrodynamics of the explosive lenses. Bethe considered Fuchs "one of the most valuable men in my division" and "one of the best theoretical physicists we had."

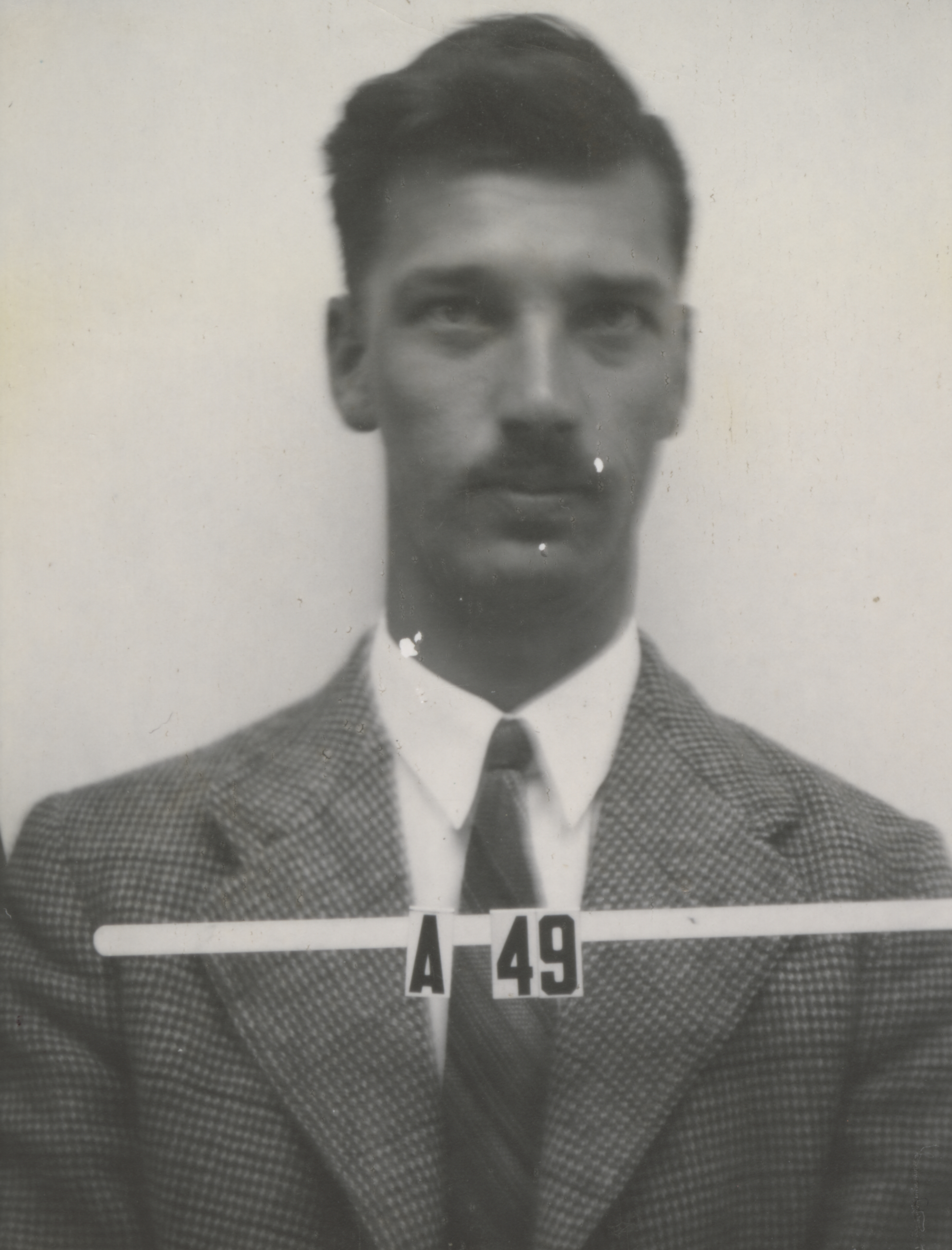
James Tuck's ID badge photo from Los Alamos

William Penney worked on means to assess the effects of a nuclear explosion, and wrote a paper on what height the bombs should be detonated at for maximum effect in attacks on Germany and Japan. He served as a member of the target committee established by Groves to select Japanese cities for atomic bombing, and on Tinian with Project Alberta as a special consultant. Along with Group Captain Leonard Cheshire, sent by Wilson as a British representative, he watched the bombing of Nagasaki from the observation plane Big Stink. He also formed part of the Manhattan Project's post-war scientific mission to Hiroshima and Nagasaki that assessed the extent of the damage caused by the bombs.

Bethe declared that:

For the work of the theoretical division of the Los Alamos Project during the war the collaboration of the British Mission was absolutely essential ... It is very difficult to say what would have happened under different conditions. However, at least, the work of the Theoretical Division would have been very much more difficult and very much less effective without the members of the British Mission, and it is not unlikely that our final weapon would have been considerably less efficient in this case.

From December 1945 on, members of the British Mission began returning home. Peierls left in January 1946. At the request of Norris Bradbury, who had replaced Oppenheimer as laboratory director, Fuchs remained until 15 June 1946. Eight British scientists, three from Los Alamos and five from the United Kingdom, participated in Operation Crossroads, the nuclear tests at Bikini Atoll in the Pacific. With the passage of the Atomic Energy Act of 1946, known as the McMahon Act, all British government employees had to leave. Titterton was granted a special dispensation, and remained until 12 April 1947. The British Mission ended when he departed. Carson Mark remained, as he was a Canadian government employee. He remained at Los Alamos, becoming head of its Theoretical Division in 1947, a position he held until he retired in 1973. He became a United States citizen in the 1950s.

=== Feed materials ===
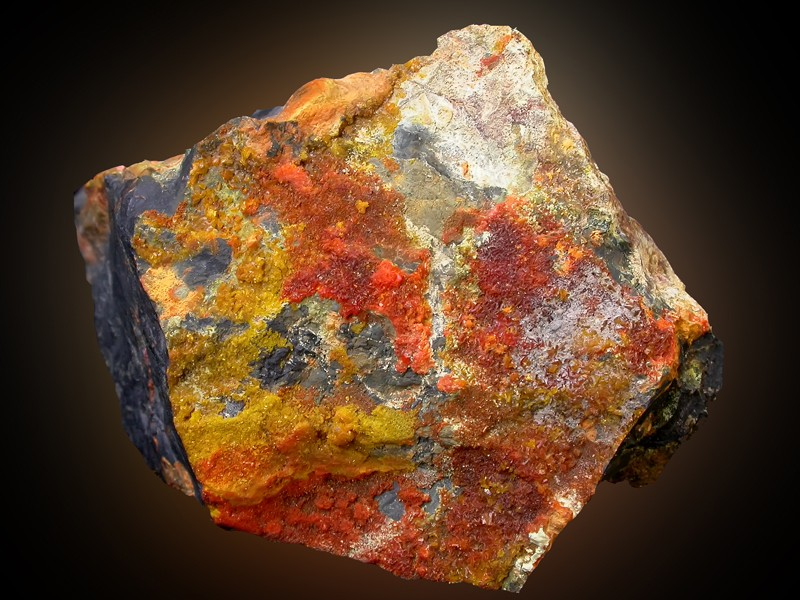
Uranium ore from the Shinkolobwe Mine in the Congo

The Combined Development Trust was proposed by the Combined Policy Committee on 17 February 1944. The declaration of trust was signed by Churchill and Roosevelt on 13 June 1944. The trustees were approved at the Combined Policy Committee meeting on 19 September 1944. The United States trustees were Groves, who was elected chairman, geologist Charles K. Leith, and George L. Harrison. The British trustees were Sir Charles Hambro, the head of the British Raw Materials Mission in Washington, D.C., and Frank Lee from HM Treasury. Canada was represented by George C. Bateman, a deputy minister and member of the Canadian Combined Resources Board. Each of the three governments had its own raw materials resources staff, and the Combined Development Trust was a means of coordinating their efforts.

The role of the Combined Development Trust was to purchase or control the mineral resources needed by the Manhattan Project, and to avoid competition between the three. Britain had little need for uranium ores while the war continued, but was anxious to secure adequate supplies for its own nuclear weapons programme when it ended. Half the funding was to come from the United States and half from Britain and Canada. The initial $12.5 million was transferred to Groves from an account in the office of the United States Secretary of the Treasury Henry Morgenthau Jr., that was not subject to the usual accounting auditing and oversight. By the time Groves resigned from the Trust at the end of 1947, he had deposited $37.5 million into an account he controlled at the Bankers Trust. Payments were then made from this account.

Britain took the lead in negotiations to reopen the Shinkolobwe mine in the Belgian Congo, the world's richest source of uranium ore, which had been flooded and closed, as 30 percent of the stock in Union Minière du Haut Katanga, the company that owned the mine, was controlled by British interests. Sir John Anderson and Ambassador John Winant hammered out a deal in May 1944 with Edgar Sengier, the director of Union Minière, and the Belgian government for the mine to be reopened and 1,720 long tons (1,750 t) of ore to be purchased at $1.45 a pound. The Combined Development Trust also negotiated deals with Swedish companies to acquire ore from there. Oliphant approached the Australian High Commissioner in London, Sir Stanley Bruce, in August 1943 about uranium supplies from Australia, and Anderson made a direct request to the prime minister of Australia, John Curtin, during the latter's visit to Britain in May 1944 to initiate mineral exploration in Australia in places where uranium deposits were believed to exist. As well as uranium, the Combined Development Trust secured supplies of thorium from Brazil, Netherlands East Indies, Sweden and Portugal. At the time uranium was believed to be a rare mineral, and the more abundant thorium was seen as a possible alternative, as it could be irradiated to produce uranium-233, another isotope of uranium suitable for making atomic bombs.

=== Intelligence ===
In December 1943, Groves sent Robert R. Furman to Britain to establish a London Liaison Office for the Manhattan Project to coordinate scientific intelligence with the British government. Groves selected the head of the Manhattan District's security activities, Captain Horace K. Calvert, to head the London Liaison Office with the title of Assistant Military Attaché. He worked in cooperation with Lieutenant Commander Eric Welsh, the head of the Norwegian Section of MI6, and Michael Perrin from Tube Alloys. An Anglo-American intelligence committee was formed by Groves and Anderson in November 1944, consisting of Perrin, Welsh, Calvert, Furman and R. V. Jones.

At the urging of Groves and Furman, the Alsos Mission was created on 4 April 1944 under the command of Lieutenant Colonel Boris Pash to conduct intelligence in the field relating to the German nuclear energy project. The more experienced British considered creating a rival mission, but in the end agreed to participate in the Alsos Mission as a junior partner. In June 1945, Welsh reported that the German nuclear physicists captured by the Alsos Mission were in danger of being executed by the Americans, for being part of the Nazi military-industrial complex that used and killed concentration camp victims. Jones therefore arranged for them to be moved to Farm Hall, a country house in Huntingdonshire used for training by MI6 and the Special Operations Executive (SOE). The house was bugged, and the conversations of the scientists were recorded.

== Results ==
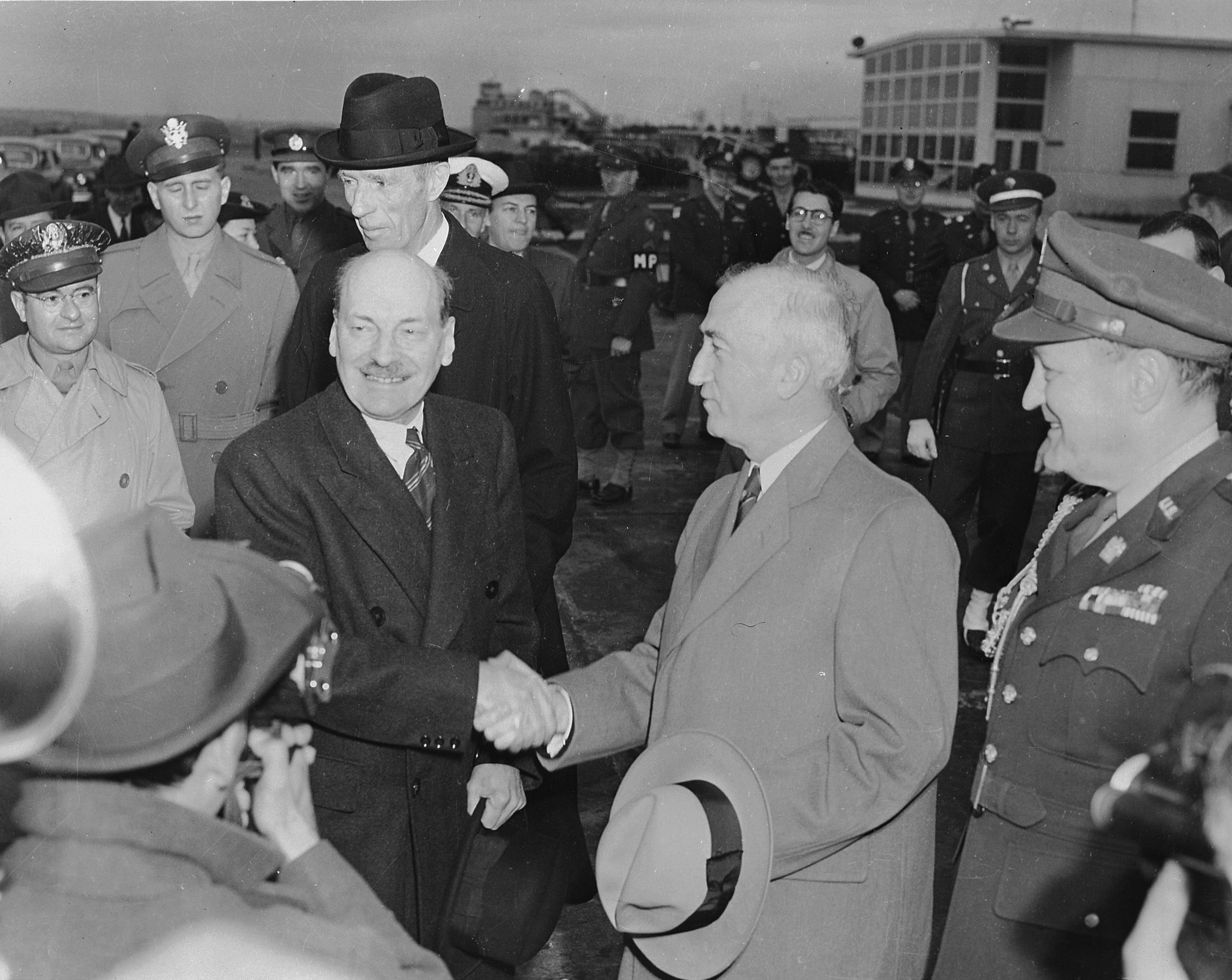
The prime minister, Clement Attlee, shakes hands with the United States Secretary of State James F. Byrnes on 10 November 1945.

Groves appreciated the early British atomic research and the British scientists' contributions to the Manhattan Project, but stated that the United States would have succeeded without them. He considered British assistance "helpful but not vital", but acknowledged that "without active and continuing British interest, there probably would have been no atomic bomb to drop on Hiroshima." He considered Britain's key contributions to have been encouragement and support at the intergovernmental level, scientific aid, the production of powdered nickel in Wales, and preliminary studies and laboratory work.

Cooperation did not long survive the war. Roosevelt died on 12 April 1945, and the Hyde Park Agreement was not binding on subsequent administrations. In fact, it was physically lost. When Wilson raised the matter in a Combined Policy Committee meeting in June, the American copy could not be found. The British sent Stimson a photocopy on 18 July 1945. Even then, Groves questioned the document's authenticity until the American copy was located years later in the papers of Vice Admiral Wilson Brown Jr., Roosevelt's naval aide, apparently misfiled by someone unaware of what Tube Alloys was, who thought it had something to do with naval guns.

Harry S. Truman (who had succeeded Roosevelt), Clement Attlee (who had replaced Churchill as prime minister in July 1945), Anderson and United States Secretary of State James F. Byrnes conferred while on a boat cruise on the Potomac River, and agreed to revise the Quebec Agreement. On 15 November 1945, Groves, Robert P. Patterson and George L. Harrison met a British delegation consisting of Anderson, Wilson, Malcolm MacDonald, Roger Makins and Denis Rickett to draw up a communiqué. They agreed to retain the Combined Policy Committee and the Combined Development Trust. The Quebec Agreement's requirement for "mutual consent" before using nuclear weapons was replaced with one for "prior consultation", and there was to be "full and effective cooperation in the field of atomic energy", but in the longer Memorandum of Intention, signed by Groves and Anderson, this was only "in the field of basic scientific research". Patterson took the communiqué to the White House, where Truman and Attlee signed it on 16 November 1945.

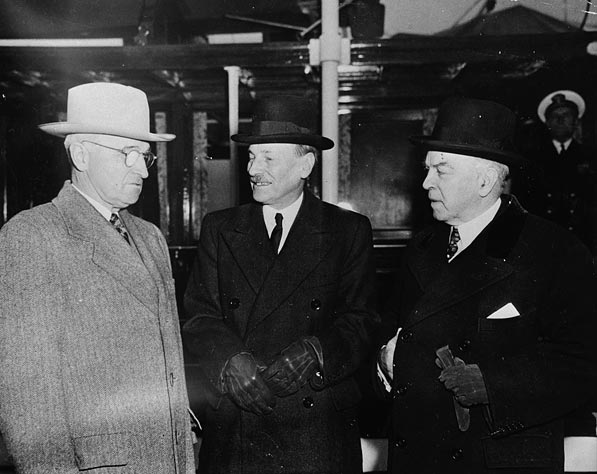
President Harry Truman and prime ministers Clement Attlee and Mackenzie King board the USS Sequoia for discussions about nuclear weapons, November 1945.

The next meeting of the Combined Policy Committee on 15 April 1946 produced no accord on collaboration, and resulted in an exchange of cables between Truman and Attlee. Truman cabled on 20 April that he did not see the communiqué he had signed as obligating the United States to assist Britain in designing, constructing and operating an atomic energy plant. Attlee's response on 6 June 1946 "did not mince words nor conceal his displeasure behind the nuances of diplomatic language." At issue was not just technical cooperation, which was fast disappearing, but the allocation of uranium ore. During the war this was of little concern, as Britain had not needed any ore, so all the production of the Congo mines and all the ore seized by the Alsos Mission had gone to the United States, but now it was also required by the British atomic project. Chadwick and Groves reached an agreement by which ore would be shared equally.

The McMahon Act, which was signed by Truman on 1 August 1946, and went into effect at midnight on 1 January 1947, ended technical cooperation. Its control of "restricted data" prevented the United States' allies from receiving any information. The remaining scientists were denied access to papers that they had written just days before. The terms of the Quebec Agreement remained secret, but senior members of Congress were horrified when they discovered that it gave the British a veto over the use of nuclear weapons. The McMahon Act fuelled resentment from British scientists and officials alike, and led directly to the British decision in January 1947 to develop its own nuclear weapons. In January 1948, Bush, James Fisk, Cockcroft and Mackenzie concluded an agreement known as the modus vivendi, that allowed for limited sharing of technical information between the United States, Britain and Canada.

As the Cold War set in, enthusiasm in the United States for an alliance with Britain cooled as well. A September 1949 poll found that 72 per cent of Americans agreed that the United States should not "share our atomic energy secrets with England". The reputation of the British Mission to Los Alamos was tarnished by the 1950 revelation that Fuchs was a Soviet atomic spy. It damaged the relationship between the United States and Britain, and provided ammunition for Congressional opponents of cooperation like Senator Bourke B. Hickenlooper.

British wartime participation in the Manhattan Project provided a substantial body of expertise that was crucial to the success of High Explosive Research, the United Kingdom's post-war nuclear weapons programme, although it was not without important gaps, such as in the field of plutonium metallurgy. The development of the independent British nuclear deterrent led to the Atomic Energy Act being amended in 1958, and to a resumption of the nuclear Special Relationship between America and Britain under the 1958 US–UK Mutual Defence Agreement.
