= Winifred Smith =

English botanist

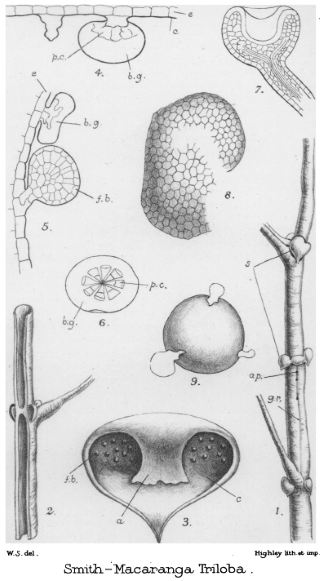
- Parts of a Macaranga triloba plant drawn by Winifred Smith

Winifred Smith (5 November 1858 – 1925) was an English botanist and educationist. She became a lecturer in the botany department at University College, London and took a leading role in supporting women students.

== First forty years ==
She was born in Mortlake, Surrey on 5 November 1858 to Fanny and James Smith, who owned and ran a building business. Some of Smith's education was at Queen's College, London, a pioneering school for girls aged from 12 to 20. She then "devoted" herself to teaching until she began studying at University College in 1899. In the late 1870s her family experienced changes: her father went bankrupt and started working as a clerk, her only sister Ethel married and moved away, and Smith and her parents moved from the long-term family home in Mortlake High Street to live in Putney.

== Botany ==
She received a BSc with honours in botany in 1904. The year before, she had published an article on Macaranga triloba. After getting her degree she did research in symbiosis. In 1905 she was awarded an 1851 Exhibition Scholarship enabling her to study seedling phases of rubber-producing sapotaceae under the direction of John Bretland Farmer. She became a Fellow of the Linnaean Society in 1908 and read a paper there on the Anatomy of some Sapotaceous Seedlings which was published in 1909. She was also a member of the British Ecological Society.

== University women ==
Smith's lectureship in botany was not quite as important to her as her "main and absorbing work", from 1912 on, of being Tutor to Women Students. This was a senior post requiring her to offer guidance and support to female students. Her obituaries emphasise what a friendly nature she had and how much people warmed to her. She was well known and well liked, and some people spoke of her affectionately as Auntie Winnie. Smith was also vice-chairman of the College Hall of Residence for women students and involved in a range of college activities, women's societies and causes. She was living with her mother in Marylebone in 1901 and 1911.

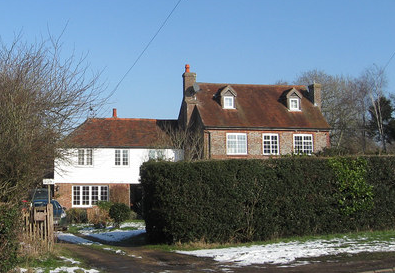
The cottages that used to belong to University College, given in memory of Winifred Smith. In Muddle Green, Chiddingly, Sussex.

She was a friend of Margaret Murray, assistant professor of egyptology at University College. Both were committed to women's education, both supported women's suffrage, and both "detested that the women members of the academic staff were treated as second-class citizens". They did not want the women academics to be limited to a cramped, inadequate common room and planned a way of making the decision-makers take note of how much more space and comfort the men had. As Murray said, "Winifred Smith...and I cooked up a little scheme to get our way". They succeeded.

After her death on 24 December 1925, a Winifred Smith Memorial trust fund, announced in The Times, was set up in her honour. The plan was to buy a cottage near her old farmhouse at Chiddingly, Sussex for the benefit of women students and members of staff: for holidays etc. The fund was enlarged by a bequest from the recent University College provost Sir Gregory Foster to commemorate his wife Maude as well as Smith, and so the college came to own two adjoining houses, Old Forge Cottage and Sunnyside in Muddle Green. This arrangement now takes the form of the Winifred Smith and Maude Foster Memorial Fund.
