= Kaye and Laby =

Scientific and mathematical reference work

Tables of Physical and Chemical Constants and Some Mathematical Functions
- Title page for Tables of Physical and Chemical Constants and Some Mathematical Functions (1911), more commonly known as "Kaye and Laby"
- Author: G. W. C. Kaye and T. H. Laby
- Language: English
- Genre: Reference work
- Publication date: 1911

Tables of Physical and Chemical Constants and Some Mathematical Functions is a scientific reference work. First compiled and published in 1911 by the physicists G. W. C. Kaye and T. H. Laby, it is more commonly known as Kaye and Laby. It is a standard textbook for scientists and engineers.

The final print edition was the 16th in 1995, after which the entire content was made available online in association with the National Physical Laboratory.

The online version was removed on 21 May 2019, the day after the revision of the SI. An archived version is still available online, but is no longer maintained, and does not have the updated values of physical constants.
