= Otto Robert Frisch =

Austrian nuclear physicist

Otto Robert Frisch OBE FRS
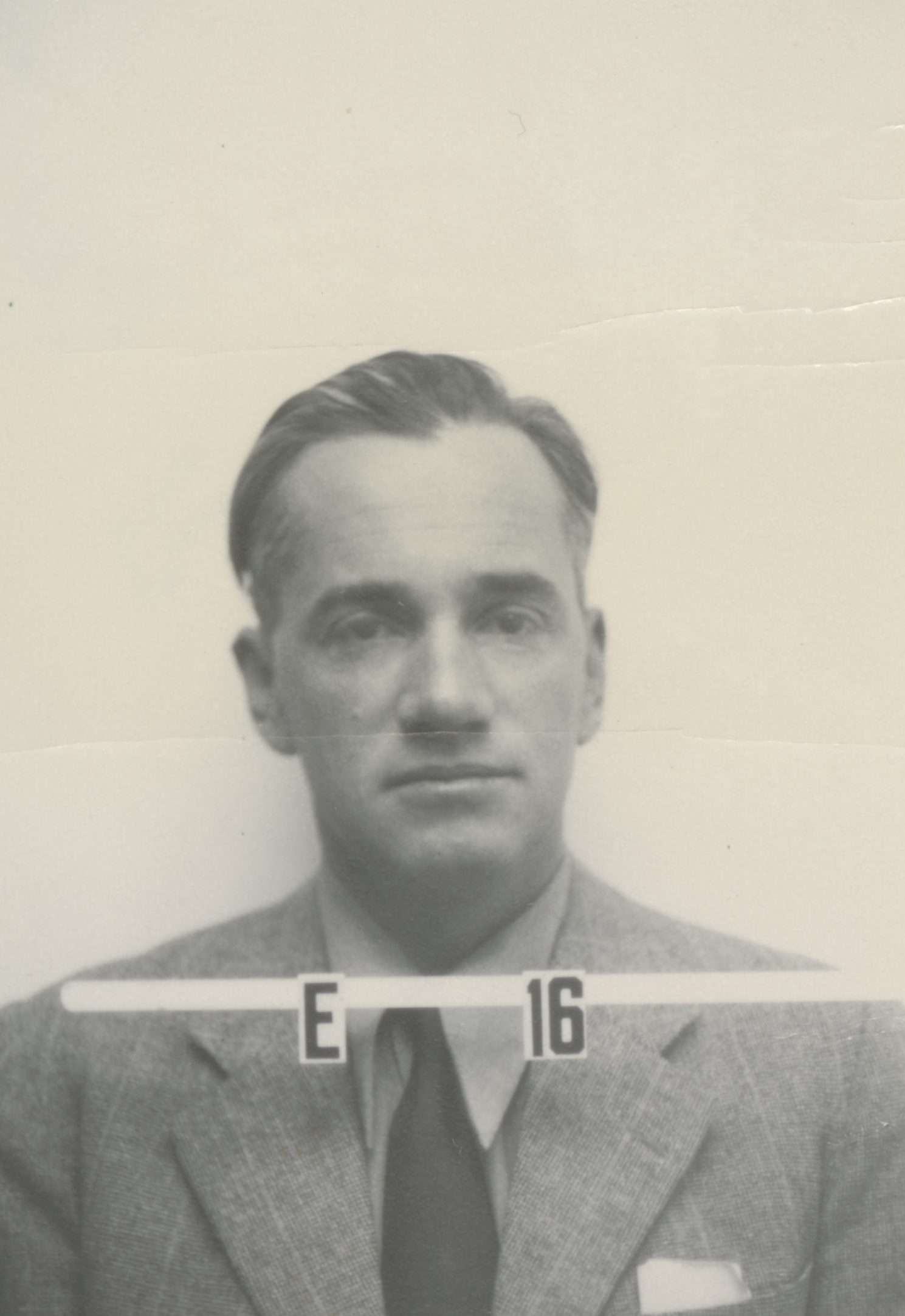
- Otto Robert Frisch's wartime Los Alamos ID badge photo
- Born: 1 October 1904; Vienna, Austria-Hungary
- Died: 22 September 1979 (aged 74); Cambridge, United Kingdom
- Citizenship: Austria; United Kingdom
- Education: University of Vienna
- Known for: Atomic bomb
- Awards: Fellow of the Royal Society
- Scientific career
- Fields: Physics

Otto Robert Frisch OBE FRS (1 October 1904 – 22 September 1979) was an Austrian physicist who worked on nuclear physics. With Otto Stern and Immanuel Estermann, he first measured the magnetic moment of the proton. With his aunt, Lise Meitner, he advanced the first theoretical explanation of nuclear fission (coining the term) and first experimentally detected the fission by-products. Later, with his collaborator, Rudolf Peierls, he designed the first theoretical mechanism for the detonation of an atomic bomb in 1940. Leading the Los Alamos Critical Assemblies experiments in 1945, he oversaw the world's first prompt criticality in the Dragon device.

== Early life ==
Otto Robert Frisch was born in Vienna in 1904 to a Jewish family, the son of Justinian Frisch, a painter, and Auguste Meitner Frisch, a concert pianist. He himself was talented at both but also shared his maternal aunt Lise Meitner's love of physics and commenced a period of study at the University of Vienna, graduating in 1926 with some work on the effect of the newly discovered electron on salts.

== Nuclear physics ==
After some years working in relatively obscure laboratories in Germany, Frisch obtained a position in Hamburg under the Nobel Laureate scientist Otto Stern. Here he produced work on the diffraction of atoms (using crystal surfaces) and also proved that the magnetic moment of the proton was much larger than had been previously supposed.

The accession of Adolf Hitler to the chancellorship of Germany in 1933 caused Otto Robert Frisch to make the decision to move to London, where he joined the staff at Birkbeck College and worked with the physicist Patrick Maynard Stuart Blackett on cloud chamber technology and artificial radioactivity. He followed this with a five-year stint in Copenhagen with Niels Bohr where he increasingly specialised in nuclear physics, particularly in neutron physics.

== Nuclear fission ==
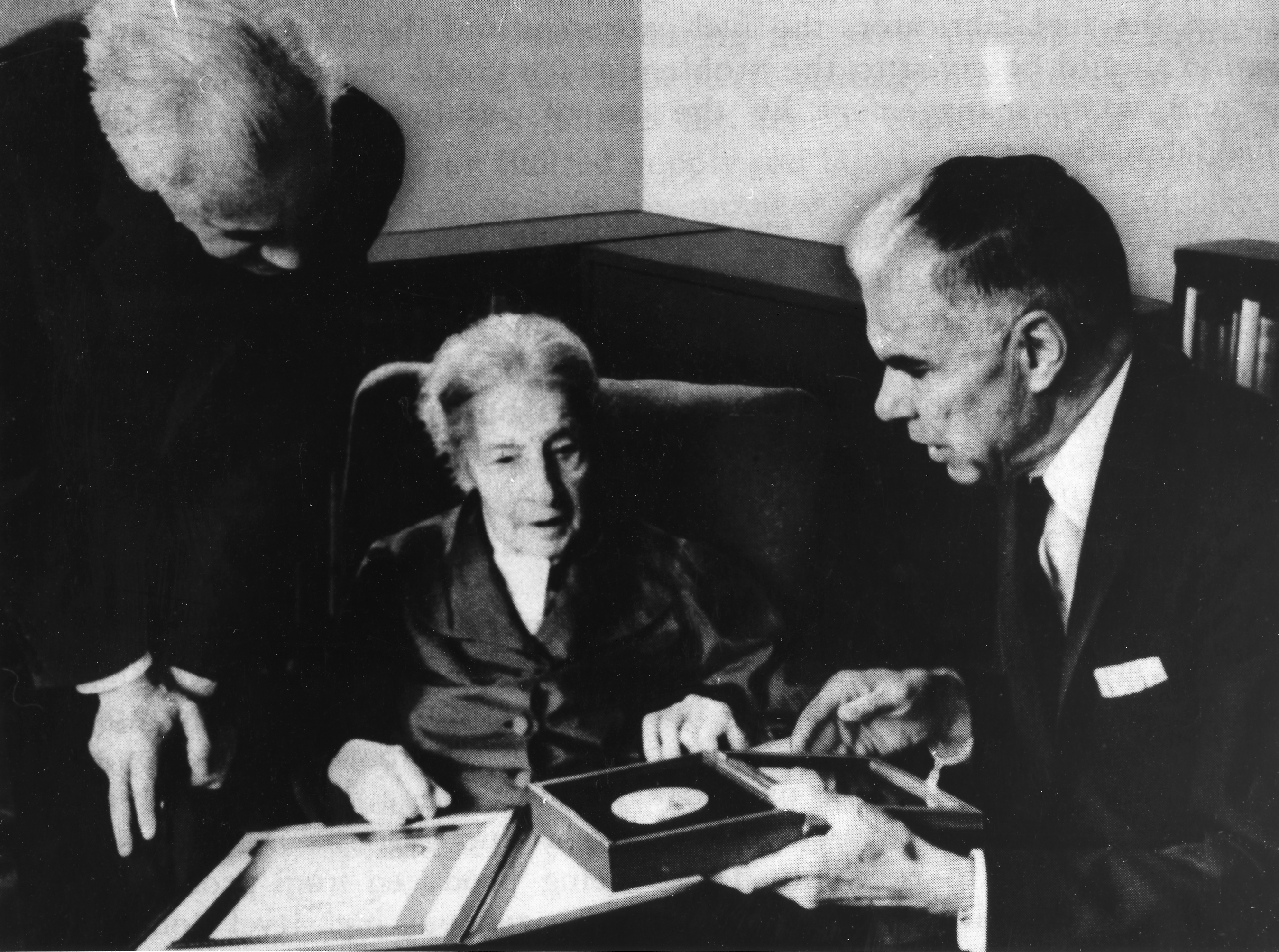
Otto Frisch, Lise Meitner, and Glenn Seaborg

During the Christmas holiday in 1938, he visited his aunt Lise Meitner in Kungälv. While there she received the news that Otto Hahn and Fritz Strassmann in Berlin had discovered that the collision of a neutron with a uranium nucleus produced the element barium as one of its byproducts. Hahn, in a letter to Meitner, called this new reaction a "bursting" of the uranium nucleus. Frisch and Meitner hypothesized that the uranium nucleus had split in two, explained the process, and estimated the energy released, and Frisch coined the term fission, adopted from a process in biology, to describe it.

Political restraints of the Nazi era forced the teams of Hahn and Strassmann and that of Frisch and Meitner (both of whom were Jewish) to publish separately. Hahn's paper described the experiment and the finding of the barium byproduct. Meitner's and Frisch's paper explained the physics behind the phenomenon.

Frisch went back to Copenhagen, where he was quickly able to isolate the pieces produced by fission reactions. As Frisch himself later recalled, a fundamental idea of the direct experimental proof of the nuclear fission was suggested to him by George Placzek. Many feel that Meitner and Frisch deserved Nobel Prize recognition for their contributions to understanding fission.

In mid-1939 Frisch left Denmark for what he anticipated would be a short trip to Birmingham, but the outbreak of World War II precluded his return. With war on his mind, he and the physicist Rudolf Peierls produced the Frisch–Peierls memorandum at the University of Birmingham, which was the first document to set out a process by which an atomic explosion could be generated. Their process would use separated uranium-235, which would require a fairly small critical mass and could be made to achieve criticality using conventional explosives to create an immensely powerful detonation. The memorandum went on to predict the effects of such an explosion—from the initial blast to the resulting fallout. This memorandum was the basis of British work on building an atomic device (the Tube Alloys project) and also that of the Manhattan Project on which Frisch worked as part of the British delegation. Frisch and Rudolf Peierls worked together in the Physics Department at the University of Birmingham 1939–40. He went to America in 1943 having been hurriedly made a British subject.

== Manhattan Project ==
In 1944 at Los Alamos, one of Frisch's tasks as the leader of the Critical Assemblies group was to accurately determine the exact amount of enriched uranium which would be required to create the critical mass, the mass of uranium which would sustain a nuclear chain reaction. He did this by stacking several dozen 3 cm bars of enriched uranium hydride at a time and measuring rising neutron activity as the critical mass was approached. The hydrogen in the metal bars increased the time that the reaction required to accelerate. One day Frisch almost caused a runaway reaction by leaning over the stack, which he termed the "Lady Godiva assembly". His body reflected neutrons back into the stack. Out of the corner of his eye he saw that the red lamps that flickered intermittently when neutrons were being emitted, were 'glowing continuously'. Realizing what was happening, Frisch quickly scattered the bars with his hand. Later he calculated that the radiation dose was "quite harmless" but that if he "had hesitated for another two seconds before removing the material ... the dose would have been fatal". "In two seconds he received, by the generous standards of the time, a full day's permissible dose of neutron radiation." In this way his experiments determined the exact masses of uranium required to fire the Little Boy bomb over Hiroshima.

He also designed the "dragon's tail" or "guillotine" experiment in which a uranium slug was dropped through a hole in larger fixed mass of uranium, reaching just above critical mass (0.1%) for a fraction of a second. At the meeting to approve the experiment, Richard Feynman, commenting on the transient danger involved, said it was "just like tickling the tail of a sleeping dragon." In the period of about 3 milliseconds, the temperature rose at a rate of 2000 °C per sec and over 10^{15} excess neutrons were emitted.

== Return to England ==
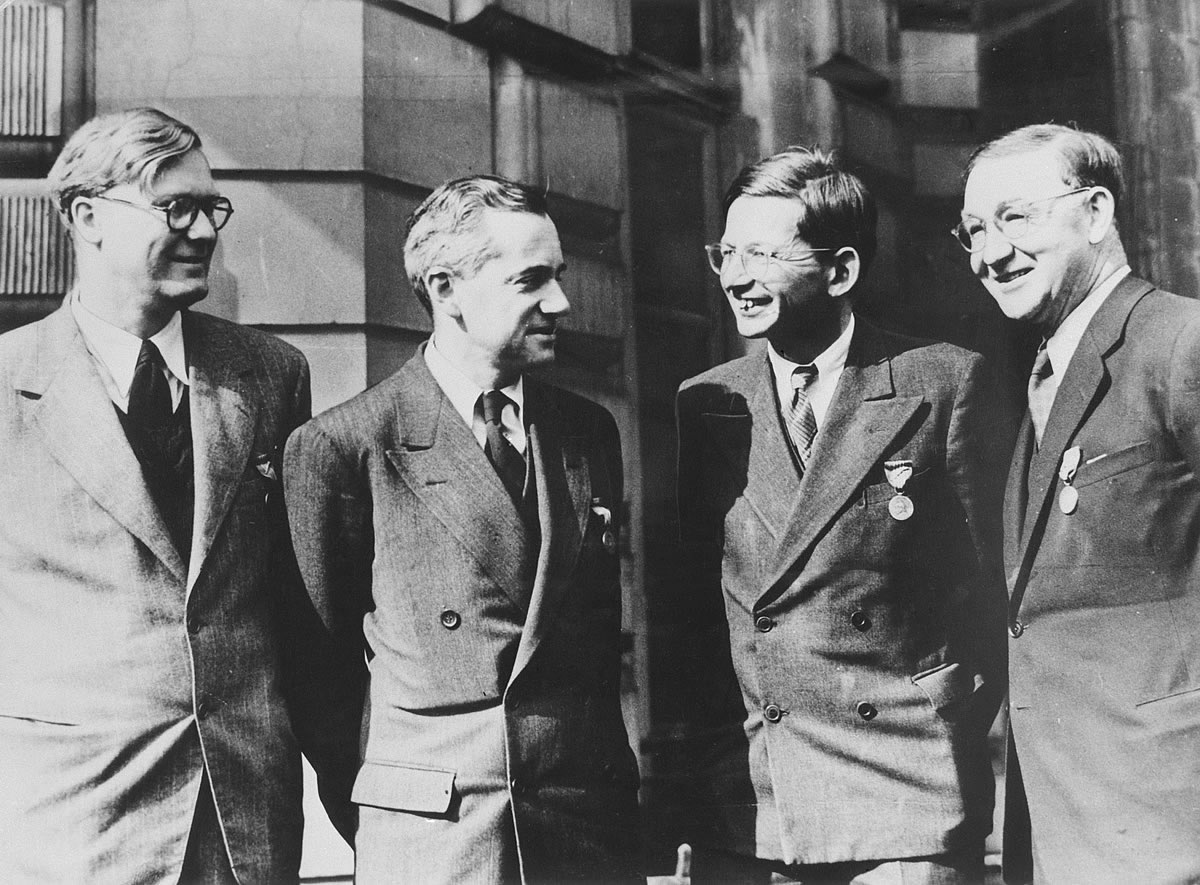
Left to right: William Penney, Otto Frisch, Rudolf Peierls and John Cockcroft in 1946

In 1946 he returned to England to take up the post of head of the nuclear physics division of the Atomic Energy Research Establishment at Harwell, though he also spent much of the next thirty years teaching at Cambridge where he was Jacksonian Professor of Natural Philosophy and a fellow of Trinity College.

Before he retired he designed a device, SWEEPNIK, that used a laser and computer to measure tracks in bubble chambers. Seeing that this had wider applications, he helped found a company, Laser-Scan Limited, now known as Laser-Scan Engineering Ltd., to exploit the idea.

== Retirement ==
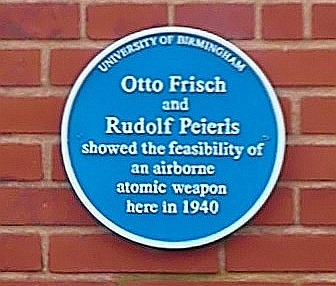
University of Birmingham - Poynting Physics Building - blue plaque

He retired from the chair in 1972 as required by University regulations. He died on 22 September 1979.

== Bibliography ==
- Atomic Physics Today (1961)
- Working with ATOMS (1965)
- What Little I Remember (1979)

Academic offices
Preceded by John Cockcroft	Jacksonian Professor of Natural Philosophy; 1947–1972	Succeeded by Alan Cook
