= 1851 Research Fellowship =

UK science and engineering fellowships

The 1851 Research Fellowship is a postdoctoral fellowship scheme administered by the Royal Commission for the Exhibition of 1851 that, since the year 1891, annually awards a three-year research scholarship to approximately eight "young scientists or engineers of exceptional promise". As of the 2027 round of applications, this was interpreted to mean that applicants should normally have "no more than 2.5 years of postdoctoral experience [...] in the year of applying". The fellowship is open to all nationalities and fields of science, including physical or biological sciences, mathematics, applied science, and any branch of engineering. The fellowship can be held anywhere in the United Kingdom.

Several other fellowships are also awarded by the Royal Commission for the Exhibition of 1851, including the Brunel Fellowship, the Research Fellowship in the Built Environment, Industrial Fellowships, and the Fellowship in Design.

== Notable alumni ==
The research fellowship known as the 1851 Exhibition Scholarship, has been awarded to numerous scientists and engineers over the years, many of whom have become leaders in their fields, and of whom 13 went on to become Nobel Laureates in their fields.

Award recipients include:

- Charles Glover Barkla, English physicist and winner of the Nobel Prize in Physics in 1917.
- Noel Benson, a research geologist and academic.
- Homi J. Bhabha, "father" of India's nuclear programme.
- Sydney Brenner, British biologist/geneticist and winner of the Nobel Prize in Physiology or Medicine in 2002.
- Eric Burhop, Australian physicist.
- Kelvin Campbell, South African / English urban designer, originator of 'Massive Small Theory'
- David Edmund Caro, Australian physicist.
- Roger Cashmore, English physicist.
- James Chadwick, English physicist and winner of the Nobel Prize in Physics in 1935.
- Hans Thacher Clarke, English-born biochemist who distinguished himself as university professor and Kodak researcher in the United States.
- John Cockcroft, English physicist and winner of the Nobel Prize for Physics in 1951. Notably, this Nobel Prize was shared with Ernest Walton, another 1851 Research Fellowship Recipient.
- John Cornforth, Australian chemist and winner of the Nobel Prize for Chemistry in 1975.
- Paul Dirac, English physicist and winner of the Nobel Prize in Physics in 1933.
- Austin Burton Edwards, Australian geologist.
- Alice Laura Embleton (1876–1960), biologist, zoologist and suffragist.
- Charles Goodeve, Canadian chemist.
- Brian Grieve, Australian botanist.
- George Harker, Australian scientist.
- Rita Harradence, (later Rita Cornforth) Australian chemist.
- Norman Haworth, British chemist and winner of the Nobel Prize in Chemistry in 1937.
- Peter Higgs, British physicist and winner of the Nobel Prize in Physics in 2013.
- Edwin Sherbon Hills, Australian geologist.
- Fred Hoyle, British astronomer noted primarily for the theory of stellar nucleosynthesis and coining the term "Big Bang".
- Aaron Klug, winner of the Nobel Prize in Chemistry in 1982.
- Yamuna Krishnan, Indian-American chemist, winner of the Infosys Prize.
- June Lascelles, Australian microbiologist.
- Geoff Malcolm, New Zealand physical chemist.
- Leslie Martin, Australian physicist.
- Harrie Massey, Australian physicist.
- Thomas E. Nevin, Irish physicist.
- Mark Oliphant, Australian physicist.
- Cormac O'Ceallaigh, Irish physicist.
- J. R. Partington, British chemist.
- Joseph Pawsey, Australian radio astronomer.
- William Penney, Baron Penney, English physicist.
- Sir Robert Howson Pickard (1896), British chemist; Vice-Chancellor of the University of London.
- Kathleen Prendergast, Australian paleontologist.
- Darshan Ranganathan, Indian chemist.
- Robert Robinson, English chemist and winner of the Nobel Prize in Chemistry in 1947.
- James Stanley Rogers, Australian physicist.
- Alistair Rowe, Australian physicist.
- Ernest Rutherford, New Zealand physicist and winner of the Nobel Prize in Chemistry in 1908.
- Bernice Weldon Sargent, Canadian physicist.
- Winifred Smith, English botanist.
- Alexander Todd, British biochemist and winner of the Nobel Prize for Chemistry in 1957.
- Victor Trikojus, Australian biochemist.
- Ernest Walton, Irish physicist and winner of the Nobel Prize for Physics in 1951. Notably, this prize was shared with John Cockcroft, another 1851 Research Fellowship recipient.
- Herbert E. Watson, Ramsey Professor in Chemical Engineering at University College London.
