= Kathleen Prendergast =

Australian paleontologist and physician

Kathleen Laura Prendergast M.R.C.S. (19 November 1910 – 1 June 1954) was an Australian paleontologist, who later retrained as a doctor and was commissioned into the Royal Army Medical Corps. She was appointed as Regimental Medical Officer to the 1st Battalion, The Black Watch. She was the first, and at the time of her death, the only female to hold this role in the British Army.

== Education ==
Kathleen Prendergast was born in Carlton, Victoria, Australia the eldest of two daughters. The family moved to Western Australia where Prendergast studied geology at the University of Western Australia graduating with a Bachelor of Science (Honours) in 1933 and then a Diploma of Education in 1934. She was awarded a Hackett Research Studentship to study 'The Permo-Carboniferous fauna of W.A.' in 1935 and after a year she left the University of Western Australia to work with A.G. Brighton at the Sedgwick Museum in Cambridge. She was awarded an 1851 Research Fellowship and was awarded a PhD in 1939.

She then changed direction and went on to study medicine at King's College Hospital London and qualified in medicine in 1944.

== Paleontology ==
In 1935 Prendergast published work from her honours describing and illustrating 12 fossil genera, one of which was new as well as 10 species of which 4 were new. A longer paper in 1943 covered 27 species of which 7 were new. Some time after 1939, Prendergast apparently gave up her paleontological studies once she became a medical doctor.

=== Publications ===
- Prendergast, KL 1935. Some Western Australian Upper Palaeozoic fossils: Journal of the Royal Society of Western Australia, v. 21, p. 9–35.
- Prendergast, KL 1936. Notes on the types of Spirifer rostalinus Hosking: Journal of the Royal Society of Western Australia, v. 22, p. 129.
- Prendergast, KL 1943. Permian Productinae and Strophalosiinae of Western Australia: Journal of the Royal Society of Western Australia, v. 28, p. 1–73.
- Clarke, E de C, Prendergast, KL, Teichert, C and Fairbridge, RW 1951. Permian succession and structure in the northern part of the Perth Basin, Western Australia: Journal of the Royal Society of Western Australia, v. 35, p. 31–84

== Medical service ==
Prendergast undertook her medical training during World War II and upon completion was appointed to the Royal Army Medical Corps and went to Germany in 1945. In 1946 she was assigned as Resident Medical Officer (RMO) to the Black Watch Regiment, this time with the rank of Major. This was the first ever RMO appointment to the British Army made to a female.

Prendergast died at on 1 June 1954 from sarcoma of the lung aged 44, she is buried at the hospital cemetery. At her funeral the song 'Australian Ladies' was played as her coffin was carried by members of the Black Watch regiment.
