= Eric Burhop =

Australian physicist & humanitarian (1911–1980)

Eric Burhop FRS
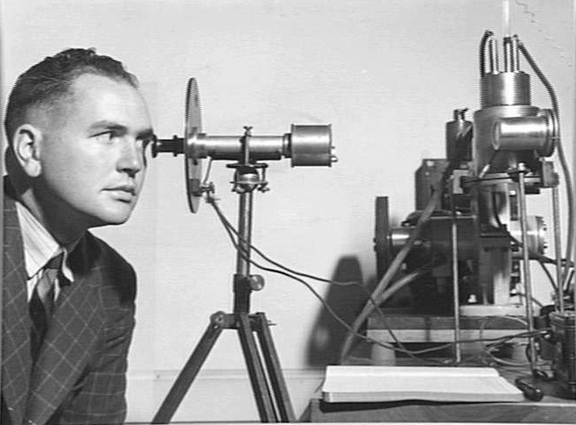
- Burhop uses an optical pyrometer to measure the temperature within an apparatus
- Born: 31 January 1911; Hobart, Tasmania, Australia
- Died: 22 January 1980 (aged 68); Camden, London, England
- Education: University of Melbourne; University of Cambridge
- Awards: Fellow of the Royal Society (1963); Joliot-Curie Medal of Peace (1965); Lenin Peace Prize (1972); Order of Saints Cyril and Methodius (1973)
- Scientific career
- Workplaces: Cavendish Laboratory; Radiation Laboratory; University of Melbourne; University College, London
- Thesis: The ionization and reorganization of an atom in an inner shell, with special reference to the Dirac theory of the electron; Some problems in atomic disintegration; Note on the migration of atoms on a surface (1938)
- Doctoral advisor: Thomas Laby

Eric Henry Stoneley Burhop, FRS (31 January 1911 – 22 January 1980) was an Australian physicist and humanitarian.

A graduate of the University of Melbourne, Burhop was awarded an 1851 Exhibition Scholarship to study at the Cavendish Laboratory under Lord Rutherford. Under the supervision of Mark Oliphant, he investigated nuclear fusion. He produced a non-relativistic theory of the Auger effect in 1935, followed by a relativistic treatment the following year. He later wrote a monograph on the subject. He returned to the University of Melbourne as a lecturer in 1936, and helped Professor Thomas Laby build up the physics department there.

During the Second World War, he worked in the Radiophysics Laboratory in Sydney, where he produced a laboratory model of a cavity magnetron. In September 1942, he returned to Melbourne as the officer in charge of the Radar Research Laboratory, where he continued the development of cavity magnetrons and reflex klystrons for radar sets. In May 1944, he became one of three Australian physicists who worked on the Manhattan Project, which created the first atomic bombs. In early 1945, Harrie Massey offered Burhop a position as a lecturer in the Mathematics Department at University College, London. He fostered international cooperation in nuclear physics.

While never formally charged with atomic espionage or so much as directly questioned by investigators, due to his leftist political views, anti-nuclear activism as well as his personal links to exposed Soviet spies, Burhop was the subject of comprehensive surveillance on the part of the UK, US and Australia's counterespionage agencies in the 1940s–1950s, a fact that was publicised in 2019.

== Early life ==
Eric Henry Stoneley Burhop was born in Hobart, Tasmania, on 31 January 1911, the third child of two Salvation Army officers, Henry Augustus Burhop and his wife Bertha née Head. He had two older sisters, Edna and Vera. His family was not wealthy, and they moved frequently owing to the nature of his parents' evangelical work. The family moved to Ballarat in 1923, where he attended Ballarat High School for most of his secondary education, receiving his leaving (Year 11) certificate in 1926. He transferred to Melbourne High School for his final year.

Burhop won a scholarship, and entered the University of Melbourne in 1928. He initially studied civil engineering, but switched to science after two years, and majored in physics. In 1929, he was awarded a bursary that provided financial assistance. He graduated in 1931 with a Bachelor of Science BSc degree with first class honours in physics. He then earned a Bachelor of Arts (BA), also with first class honours, in mathematics in 1932, and a Master of Science in physics in 1933.

For a master's research problem, Professor Thomas Laby had Burhop investigate the probability K shell ionisation by electron impact by measuring the intensity of the resultant X-ray emissions. This aroused an interest in the Auger effect, a subject in which he would later become an authority. By contrast, his master's thesis on "The Band Spectra of Diatomic Molecules" had little influence on his later work.

== Cavendish Laboratory ==
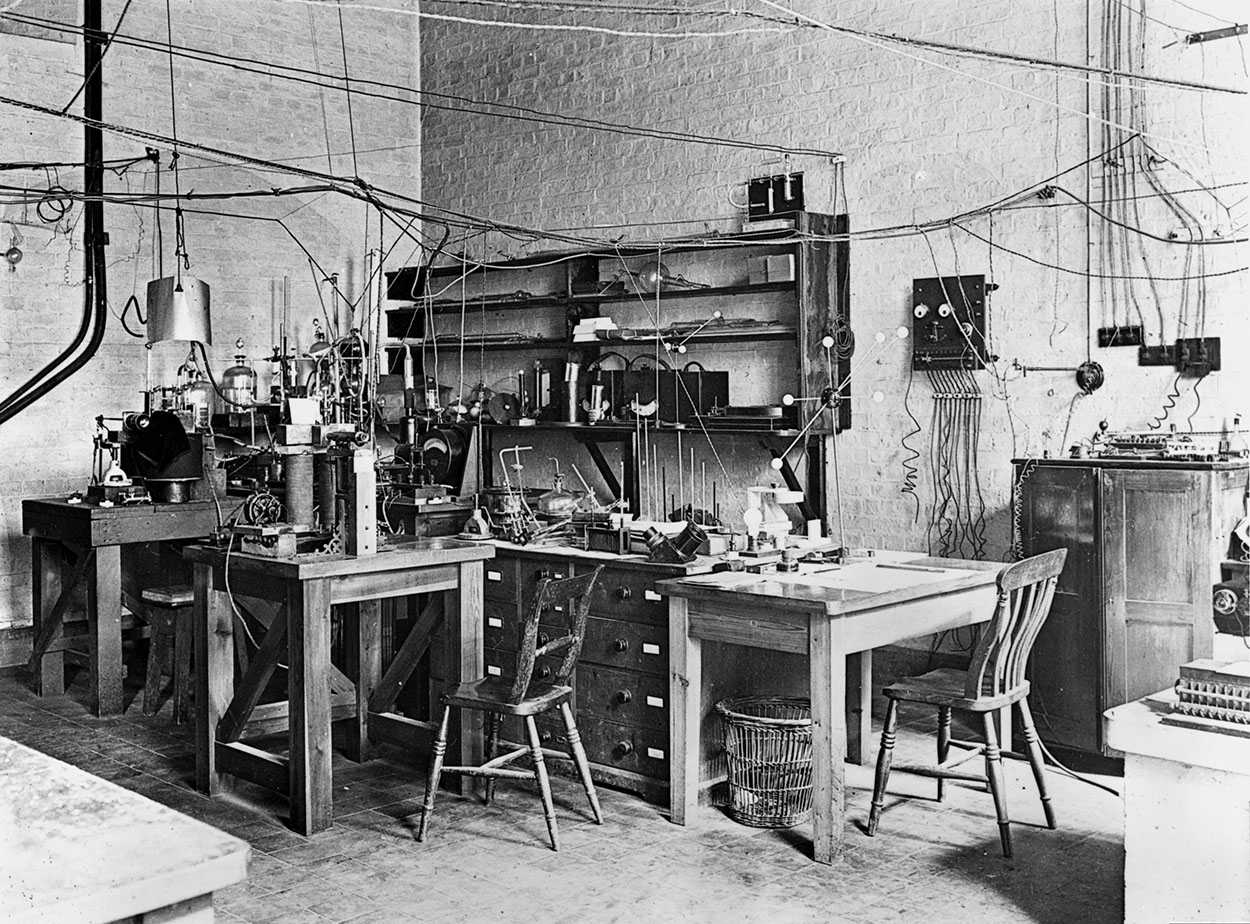
Sir Ernest Rutherford's laboratory

The thesis was good enough, though, for Burhop to be awarded an 1851 Exhibition Scholarship to study at Cambridge University's Cavendish Laboratory under Lord Rutherford in 1933. The scholarship included a first-class ticket to London on the liner RMS Oronsay. At this time the Cavendish Laboratory was one of the leading centres of physics in the world. In 1932, Cavendish laboratory scientists John Cockcroft and Ernest Walton split the atomic nucleus, James Chadwick discovered the neutron, and Patrick Blackett and Giuseppe Occhialini confirmed the existence of the positron. Burhop was supervised by a fellow Australian, Mark Oliphant. He was initially assigned a task of investigating the diffusion of positive alkali metal ions on hot metal surfaces, but soon switched to a more interesting subject, the measurement of the excitation function for the pairs of deuterons producing a triton through nuclear fusion:

^{2}_{1}D + ^{2}_{1}D → ^{3}_{1}T + p

Burhop was able to observe the reaction at energies of less than 8 keV. He continued his investigations of X-rays and the Auger effect. He conducted investigation of the probabilities of the ionisation of the K and L shells of silver, using the Born approximation. In 1935, he produced a non-relativistic theory of the Auger effect . This followed by a relativistic treatment in 1936 with Harrie Massey, another Australian expatriate fellow at the Cavendish. His work on the Auger effect would culminate in a monograph, The Auger Effect and Other Radiationless Transitions (1952).

Before coming to Cambridge, Burhop had not engaged in political activities. At Cambridge he encountered political debate generated by the suffering caused by the Great Depression and the rise of fascism in Europe. While he rejected his parents' faith in favour of rationalist science, he did not reject their values, especially that of compassion for others, and there was no estrangement between them. At Cambridge he embraced socialism, and believed that scientists had a moral responsibility to society, one that included fighting fascism.

== University of Melbourne ==
Burhop returned to Australia in 1936, taking up a position as a lecturer at the University of Melbourne, where Laby was eager to build up the Physics Department by adding expertise in the latest developments in nuclear physics. He married his fiancée, Winifred Ida Stevens, on 23 December 1936 in a Salvation Army ceremony. They had a daughter and two sons. He completed his Cambridge doctor of philosophy (PhD) degree under Laby's supervision in 1938. It was in three parts: "The ionization and reorganization of an atom in an inner shell, with special reference to the Dirac theory of the electron"; "Some problems in atomic disintegration"; and "Note on the migration of atoms on a surface". Burhop established the first research program in the field in an Australian university, employing scientific equipment that he brought back from Britain. The centrepiece of the research effort was a 300 keV accelerator that produced a homogeneous neutron beam, which he commissioned in August 1939. He gave lectures on modern physics to the undergraduates, and on quantum mechanics to the postgraduates.

After the outbreak of the Second World War in 1939, the Physics Department worked on the development of optical munitions, particularly aluminised mirrors for aerial photography. In February 1942, Oliphant persuaded Laby to release Burhop and Leslie Martin to work on microwave radar at the Radiophysics Laboratory in Sydney. Burhop and Martin produced a laboratory model of a cavity magnetron on 23 July 1942. Their magnetron was based on an overseas design, but made entirely from local components so that it could be manufactured in Australia. In September 1942 he returned to the University of Melbourne as the officer in charge of the Radar Research Laboratory, an outpost of the Radiophysics Laboratory, where his task was turning his cavity magnetrons and reflex klystrons from prototypes into production models. Eventually, over 2,000 radar sets were produced in Australia.

== Manhattan Project ==
In January 1944, Oliphant had Sir David Rivett, the head of the Council for Scientific and Industrial Research, release Burhop to work on the Manhattan Project, the Allied effort to create atomic bombs. In May 1944, Burhop joined Oliphant's British Mission at the Ernest Lawrence's Radiation Laboratory (Lawrence Berkeley National Laboratory). He was one of three Australian physicists working on the Manhattan Project, all at Berkeley, the others being Oliphant and Massey. The Radiation Laboratory's task was to develop an electromagnetic isotope separation process. Burhop worked with David Bohm in Massey's Theoretical Group, studying the characteristics of electric discharges in magnetic fields, today known as Bohm diffusion. They also studied the ionisation of uranium compounds used as feed in the electromagnetic uranium enrichment process such as uranium tetrachloride (UCl_{4}) and uranium hexafluoride (UF_{6}). Burhop's work involved the occasional visit to the Manhattan Project's Y-12 electromagnetic faculty at Oak Ridge, Tennessee.

== University College, London ==
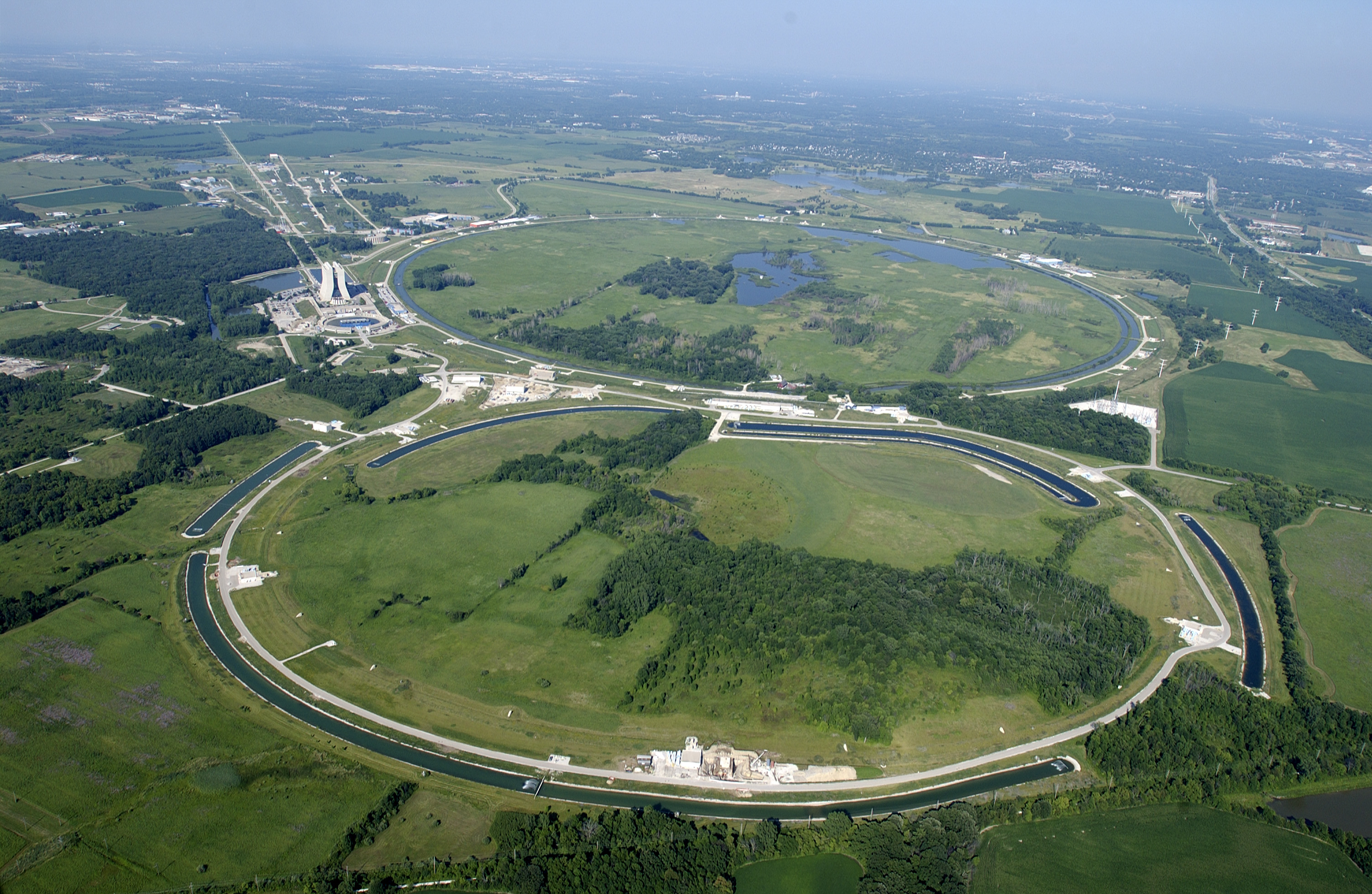
Fermi National Accelerator Laboratory, Main Ring and Main Injector as seen from the air. The circular ponds dissipate waste heat from the equipment.

In early 1945, Massey offered Burhop a position as a lecturer at University College, London, in the Mathematics Department, of which Massey was the departmental head. He had to wait until he was released by the University of Melbourne, and did not reach London until after the war ended in August 1945. His wife and family, who had stayed in Australia while he was working in the United States, joined him in London some months later. Living and working conditions in London were much worse than in California or Australia. Wartime shortages persisted, and the college had suffered bombing damage, so the Mathematics Department were located in temporary quarters. He was promoted to reader in 1949. Massey became head of the Physics Department in 1950, and Burhop moved there too. He became a professor in 1960, and Dean of the Faculty of Science in 1967.

Burhop listed "furtherance of international scientific cooperation" as one of his hobbies. He worked with the University of Edinburgh and the University of Padua to establish a high-altitude cloud chamber on Marmolada that commenced operation in 1953. In 1957, he collaborated with Occhialini and C. F. Powell on a five-nation study of K mesons and their interaction with atomic nuclei that went on for several years, and produced a wealth of new results, including the first observation of a double lambda hypernucleus. He spent the 1962–63 academic year on secondment to CERN, and was secretary of a committee chaired by Edoardo Amaldi that drew up its policy for accelerator development. The machines the committee recommended, the Intersecting Storage Rings and the Super Proton Synchrotron (SPS) were built, and became an important part of physics research in Europe for decades to come.

When Burhop took charge of the Bubble Chamber Group at University College in 1967, he was quick to grasp the advantages of heavy liquid bubble chambers for studying neutrino interactions, and steered the group towards participation in joint European ventures, using the Gargamelle. The group's discovery of neutral currents in 1973 was a milestone on the road to the theoretical unification of electromagnetism with the weak force. In 1974 and 1975, with the help of Robert R. Wilson, the director of the Fermilab in the United States, an international team from Fermilab and seven European laboratories under Burhop's leadership carried out a search for a new particle, the existence of which Burhop had predicted in 1963. He had suggested that neutrino interactions could create short-lived (perhaps as low as 10^{−14} s) particles that could be detected with the use of nuclear emulsion. Experiment E247 at Fermilab successfully detected particles with a lifetime of the order of 10^{−13} s. A follow-up experiment WA17 with the SPS confirmed the existence of the Λ^{+}_{c} (charmed lambda baryon), with a flight time of 7.3 ± 0.1 × 10^{−13} s.

== Political views, suspicions of espionage, and death ==
Burhop was involved in activities sponsored by the Soviet Union since 1939, according to a file kept on him by the Australian security service. In the early 1940s, he lectured at events organised by Communist Party of Australia-linked groups. A file compiled in 1955 by the ASIO has a summary related to 1946 (shortly after he left the U.S. for Britain) on his political activity and convictions that concluded that "whilst not definitely Communistic in his views, [he was] somewhat 'pink', yet "regarded as intensely loyal, and could be classed as a Socialist rather than a Communist".

Following Klaus Fuchs voluntarily confessing in January 1950 he had been spying for the Soviets, the UK government received a report from the FBI that said that "as late as 1945 an Australian atomic scientist who [had] worked on an Atomic Energy project was in close touch with Communist Party members in Brooklyn, New York, and through them with the highest Communist officials in the United States." The subsequent secret investigation carried out in the UK by MI5 concluded in a May 1951 memo: "Although not conclusively identifiable from the F.B.I. information, Burhop is the person who appears most likely to be identical with the scientist in question."

Nevertheless, Burhop was never brought in for questioning, nor arrested, which experts believe is most likely because the information pointing to Burhop had come from the decoded Venona intercepts, then a closely guarded secret source of intelligence. Also, he was believed to be an associate of Ian Milner, who was known through Venona intercepts to have passed secret documents to the Soviet Union. In July 1951, the British government cancelled his passport when he accepted an offer to travel to the Soviet Union. A new passport was issued after he gave the Foreign Secretary a written assurance that he would not seek to travel to the Soviet Union or other Iron Curtain countries. MI5 continued to surveil him until at least 1958.

Like many scientists who had worked on the Manhattan Project, Burhop was concerned about the dangers of nuclear weapons, and addressed over 500 public meetings to raise awareness of the subject. He had been a founding member of the Australian Association of Scientific Workers in 1939, and after the war became chairman of the Atomic Science Committee of the Association of Scientific Workers, and a member of its Science Policy Committee, in Britain. In this capacity he helped organise the Pugwash Conferences on Science and World Affairs in 1957. He was a founder member of the British Society for Social Responsibility in Science in 1969. He was president of his local branch of the Association of University Teachers from 1970 to 1972, and of the World Federation of Scientific Workers from 1971 to 1980.

Over the years Burhop received a number of honours and awards. He was elected a Fellow of the Royal Society in 1963, and delivered its Rutherford Memorial Lecture in 1979. He was elected a Foreign Member of the German Democratic Republic's Academy of Sciences in 1971. He received the Joliot-Curie Medal of Peace in 1965, the Lenin Peace Prize in 1972, and the Bulgarian Order of Saints Cyril and Methodius in 1973.

Burhop retired in 1978. He died in Camden, London, from empyema as a result of stomach cancer on 22 January 1980. He was survived by his wife and children. His papers are in the University College, London, Special Collections.
