= George Harker (scientist) =

George Percy Harker (12 February 1878 – 15 August 1957) was an Australian chemist and inventor. He spent his professional career alternating between teaching and chemical research. Harker published over a dozen research articles in the field of chemistry and was a Fellow of the Royal Australian Chemical Institute. He was the inventor of a patented system of extinguishing fires at sea and fumigation.

== Early life ==
Harker was born in Fitzroy, Victoria, to John Harker, a manufacturer, and his wife Priscilla Melita (née Boase). He was the younger brother of Constance Harker and the grandson of The Hon. George Harker. He was educated in Melbourne until the family moved to Petersham, New South Wales, where he attended Newington College (1892–1895). In 1895, Harker won the Wigram Allen Scholarship, awarded by Sir George Wigram Allen, for classics, and at the end of the year was named Dux of the College and received the Schofield Scholarship. He went up to the University of Sydney and in 1899 graduated as a Bachelor of Science.

== Career ==
Whilst still studying, Harker was appointed as a demonstrator in chemistry at the University of Sydney and in 1901 he became a science teacher at Hawkesbury Agricultural College. He was then awarded an 1851 Research Fellowship for study in England and in 1903 received a Doctor of Science (DSc) from University College, London. On his return to Sydney he became a research chemist at Colonial Sugar Refining Company. In 1914, Harker returned to Sydney University as a lecturer in organic chemistry and remained there until 1927. After working as an analytical and consulting chemist in Melbourne for two years he became a research officer with the Cancer Research Committee at the University of Sydney in 1929. In his final years before retirement, Harker returned to teaching science as a master at Trinity Grammar School (New South Wales).

== Publications ==
- Chemical decomposition by radiation – Sydney University Cancer Research Committee Journal, 2 (1930), 111–118.
- Chemical decomposition by radiation. The relation of gaseous ionisation to chemical reaction – Sydney University Cancer Research Committee Journal, 2 (1930), 160–181.
- The action of x and gamma radiation upon aqueous solutions of iodine and potassium iodide – The Medical Journal of Australia, (December 1930), 817–820.
- Chemical decomposition by radiation – Sydney University Cancer Research Committee Journal, 3 (1931), 28–34.
- (Abstract) The influence of x-radiation upon catalytic decomposition – Australian and New Zealand Association for the Advancement of Science. Report of the Meeting, 21 (Sydney, 1932), 380.
- The effect of x- and gamma radiation on adsorption – Society of Chemical Industry Journal, 51 (1932), 314t-316t.
- The relation of adsorption to catalysis and the catalytic union of ethylene and hydrogen – Society of Chemical Industry Journal, 51 (1932), 323t-326t.
- Radio-sensitivity from the chemical viewpoint – Sydney University Cancer Research Committee Journal, 4 (1932), 109–117.
- The decomposition of chloroform by radiation from radon – Royal Society of New South Wales Journal and Proceedings, 67 (1933), 96–117.
- Influence of sensitizers on chemical reactions produced by gamma radiation – Nature, 133 (1934), 378–379.
- The influence of sensitizers in chemical reactions produced by x and gamma radiation – Sydney University Cancer Research Committee Journal, 5 (1934), 189–196.
- Effect of time and intensity of radium radiation upon the inverting capacity of yeast – Nature, 137 (1936), 190–191.
- (With W. Moppett) The effect of metabolic inhibitors on the therapeutic irradiation of mouse tumours – Australian Journal of Experimental and Medical Science, 14 (March 1936), 15–25.

Awards
Preceded by Walter Woolnough	Schofield Scholarship; Dux of Newington College; 1895	Succeeded by Reginald Robson
