= G. W. C. Kaye =

English physicist (1880–1941)

G. W. C. Kaye O.B.E., F.R.S.
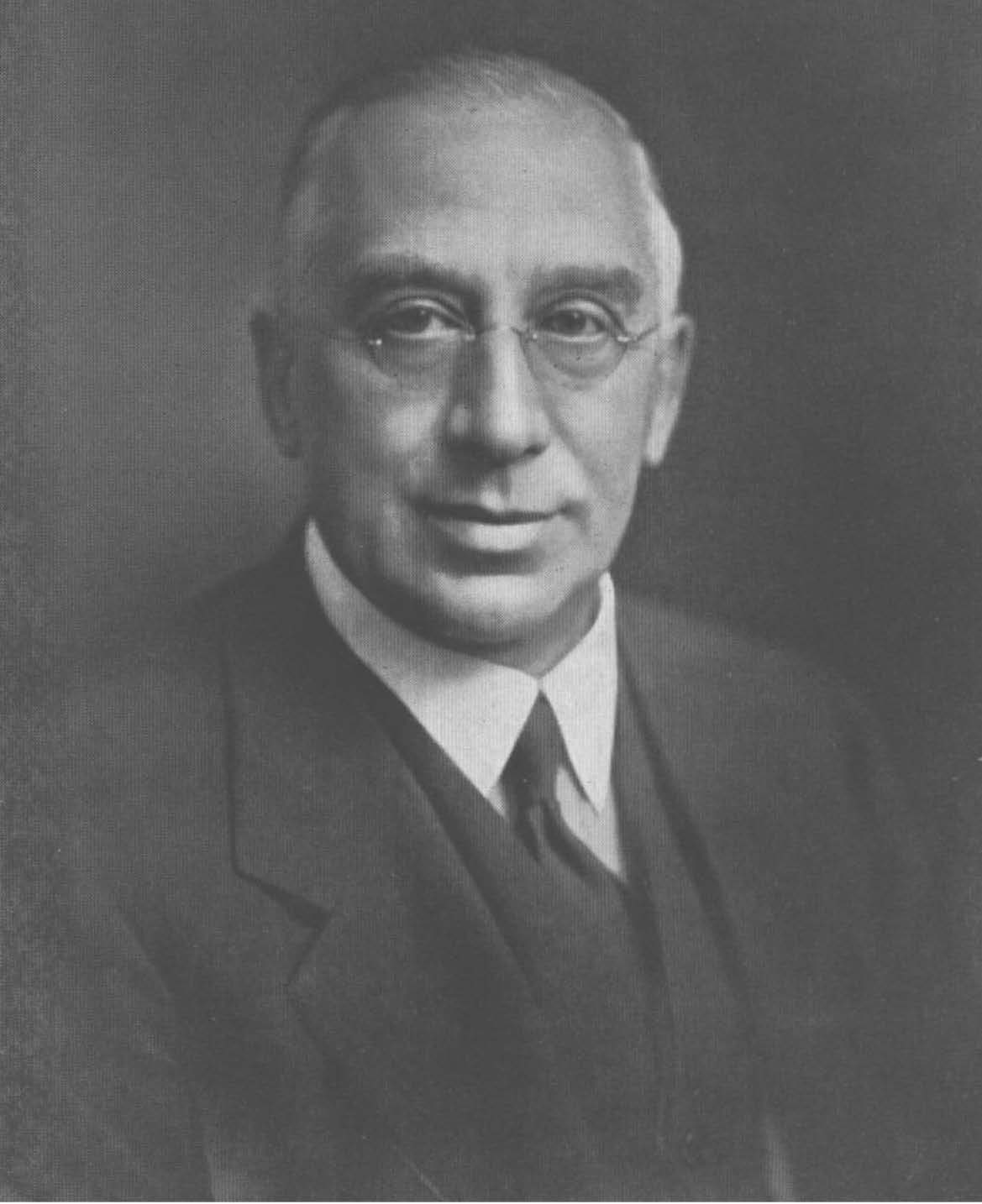
- George William Clarkson Kaye
- Born: 8 April 1880; Honley, West Riding of Yorkshire
- Died: 16 April 1941 (aged 61)
- Education: University of Cambridge
- Known for: One of the authors of Tables of Physical and Chemical Constants and Some Mathematical Functions
- Scientific career
- Fields: Physics
- Institutions: Cavendish Laboratory

George William Clarkson Kaye (8 April 1880 – 16 April 1941) was an English physicist. He is best known as one of the authors, together with Thomas Laby, of the authoritative scientific reference work Tables of Physical and Chemical Constants and Some Mathematical Functions, first published in 1911 and better known as Kaye and Laby. He was a driving force behind the formation and early years of the ‘International X-ray and Radium Protection Committee’ (IXRPC), the world's first international radiological protection body, created in 1928.

== Background and training ==
Kaye was born in Honley in West Yorkshire, and attended Huddersfield Technical School. He was made 2nd lieutenant in the Electrical Engineers (volunteer corps) on 5 December 1903, and lieutenant-colonel in 1908.

Kaye studied at University College, Liverpool and the Royal College of Science, gaining a Bachelor of Science first class degree in experimental physics in 1903. He attended Trinity College, Cambridge from 1905. He gained his Bachelor of Arts (advanced studies) on 18 June 1908.

== Career ==
Kaye's career included working as an assistant to J. J. Thomson at the Cavendish Laboratory, and work for the Metrology Department of the National Physical Laboratory.

== Institutions ==
Kaye was made a Fellow of the Royal Society in 1939.
