= June Lascelles =

Australian microbiologist (1924–2004

- Born: 23 January 1924; Sydney, New South Wales, Australia
- Died: 15 June 2004 (aged 80); Los Angeles, California, U.S.
- Known for: Microbiology, bacteriology

June Lascelles (23 January 1924 – 15 July 2004) was an Australian microbiologist. She is best known for pioneering work in microbial photosynthesis.

== Early life and education ==
June Lascelles was born in 1924 and grew up in Sydney. She began her research career in microbiology, a field in which she remained for her entire life. She attended the University of Sydney and received a BSc in biochemistry in 1944. She remained there as a research scholar and teaching fellow and later, a Linnaean Macleay fellow, receiving her MSc in 1947. Her initial research was focused on the metabolism of molecular hydrogen (H_{2}) in E. coli.

== Doctoral work at Oxford ==
Lascelles excelled in her work; so much so that in 1947 she was awarded the prestigious Royal Exhibition of 1851 Overseas Research Fellowship. She chose to move to the UK, joining the microbiology unit of the biochemistry lab at Oxford University under Donald Devereux Woods. She made several important contributions to the field of microbiology, especially in the metabolism and synthesis of enzymes in bacteria. Lascelles and William R. Sistron were credited with applying the emerging technology of pre-molecular genetics to the biosynthesis of the photosynthetic pigments called bacteriochlorophyll. She was awarded her D.Phil. in 1952, and continued her work at Oxford.

== Rockefeller fellowship at Stanford ==
In 1956, Lascelles was awarded a Rockefeller Foundation fellowship, and went to Stanford University for a year to work with C. B. van Niel at the Hopkins Marine Station at Pacific Grove, California.

Van Niel was legendary in his knowledge of microorganism biology, and this experience afforded Lascelles a great deal, especially the ability to study more exotic bacterial organisms. She worked at dispelling the previously-thought rule that anaerobes do not have cytochromes, and the provision of a soluble β-hydroxybutyrate dehydrogenase, which allowed Krebs' group to devise a now widely used assay for ketone bodies. In 1960, she was appointed University Lecturer in Microbiology at Oxford, a post she held until 1965.

== Professor at University of California ==
In 1964, while on a year's leave, Lascelles became a visiting Professor of Bacteriology at the University of California, Los Angeles; a role which was made permanent in 1965. These years were some of the most productive in her career, and her work provided the basis of understanding of tetrapyrrole synthesis in photosynthetic bacteria which holds tested and true even today. In 1979 she became Professor Emerita of Microbiology and Molecular Genetics at the University of California.

== Honours and awards ==
Lascelles was a member of the Biochemical Society from 1947 to 2002 and served on the Biochemical Journal editorial board from 1959 to 1966. She served on the editorial boards of the Journal of Bacteriology, the Journal of General Microbiology and the Archives of Microbiology. In 1990 she was elected a Fellow of the American Association for the Advancement of Science. She was an editor of Microbial Photosynthesis (1973).

== Later life and death ==
Lascelles retired in 1989, but continued to work daily until two years before her death at age 80 in 2004 due to complications from cancer. Upon her death, she was described by a colleague as "an accomplished scholar, dedicated learner, highly respected experimentalist, unique role model and rare friend".
