= T. H. Laby =

Australian physicist & chemist (1880–1946)

- Born: 3 May 1880; Creswick, Victoria, Australia
- Died: 24 June 1946 (aged 66)
- Education: University of Cambridge
- Known for: Co-author of Tables of Physical and Chemical Constants and Some Mathematical Functions
- Scientific career
- Fields: Physics; Chemistry
- Workplaces: Victoria University College, Wellington; University of Melbourne
- Notable students: Eric Burhop

Thomas Howell Laby FRS (3 May 1880 – 21 June 1946), was an Australian physicist and chemist, Professor of Natural Philosophy, University of Melbourne 1915–1942. Along with George Kaye, he was one of the founding editors of the reference book Tables of Physical and Chemical Constants and Some Mathematical Functions, usually known simply as "Kaye and Laby".

== Early life and education ==
Thomas Howell Laby was born on 3 May 1880 in Creswick, Victoria, Australia. He moved with his family to New South Wales around 1883. Laby's father, Thomas James Laby, a flour-miller, died in 1888.

After some schooling at country schools and private study, Laby joined the Taxation Department in 1898 but soon gained a position in the chemical laboratory of the NSW Department of Agriculture.

== Career ==
Laby obtained a position of acting demonstrator in chemistry at the University of Sydney, based on a recommendation by his boss F.B. Guthrie at the Department of Agriculture laboratory. Laby took evening classes at the university and in 1903 had a paper published by the Royal Society of New South Wales, "The separation of iron from nickel and cobalt".

Laby worked with Douglas Mawson, who was then a junior demonstrator in chemistry, later a geologist. The two men were the first to identify radium-bearing ore in Australia, in samples of monazite collected from the Pilbara in Western Australia. They also examined other samples collected from across New South Wales, including the Barrier Ranges, not far from Olary, South Australia, where uranium was identified a couple of years later. Mawson built an electroscope based on the design of C. T. R. Wilson in Sydney University engineering laboratory to test samples from their field trips. Professor Edgeworth David made the formal presentation of their paper describing their findings to the Royal Society of New South Wales on 5 October 1904 on the men's behalf.

In 1905 Laby went to England to study under Sir J. J. Thomson at the Cavendish Laboratory, University of Cambridge. There he received a Bachelor of Arts degree by theses on the ionization produced by alpha-particles and on the supersaturation and nuclear condensation of organic vapours. He also met Ernest Rutherford there, who became a friend.

Laby was appointed to the new chair of physics at Victoria University College in Wellington, New Zealand in 1909 and completed work with George Kaye resulting in publication of Tables of physical and chemical constants with some mathematical functions (London, 1911); the title has had sixteen editions as of 2007.

Laby was president of section A of the Australasian Association for the Advancement of Science in Melbourne, 1912.

Laby had married in 1914 and the next year was appointed to the chair of natural philosophy at the University of Melbourne. He developed valves for an anti-gas respirator, performed radiographic testing of fuses and inspected X-ray equipment for military hospitals.

Laby was awarded a Doctor of Science by the University of Cambridge in 1921 and carried on his research, mainly into heat and X-ray spectroscopy. He was Commonwealth adviser in Radium at the Commonwealth Radium Laboratory when it was established in 1929 on university grounds. In 1927 he joined the Council for Scientific and Industrial Research's Australian Radio Research Board.

In 1924 Laby was president of the Royal Society of Victoria, in 1931 he became a Fellow of the Royal Society, in 1939 was inaugural president of the Australian Institute of Physics and chairman of the Optical Munitions Panel 1940–44.

In May 1928, he and his team of collaborators from the University of Melbourne conducted street noise measurements from trams in Melbourne, with electronic instruments they manufactured, being the first time in the world that the sound level was recorded with no signal filtering (they did not use an audiometer). The first of several street measurements was made on 9 May 1928, at the corner of St Paul's Cathedral where their apparatus was set up at the top of the cathedral steps, and 3LO radio station transmitted the noise captured by the microphone.

== Later life and death ==
Laby had suffered from low blood pressure and asthma, he died on 21 June 1946 of arteriosclerosis. He was survived by his wife and two daughters.

== Legacy ==
In 1976 he was honoured on a postage stamp bearing his portrait issued by Australia Post.
