= Quebec Agreement =

1943 US–UK nuclear weapons agreement

Articles of Agreement Governing Collaboration Between the Authorities of the U.S.A. and U.K. in the Matter of Tube Alloys
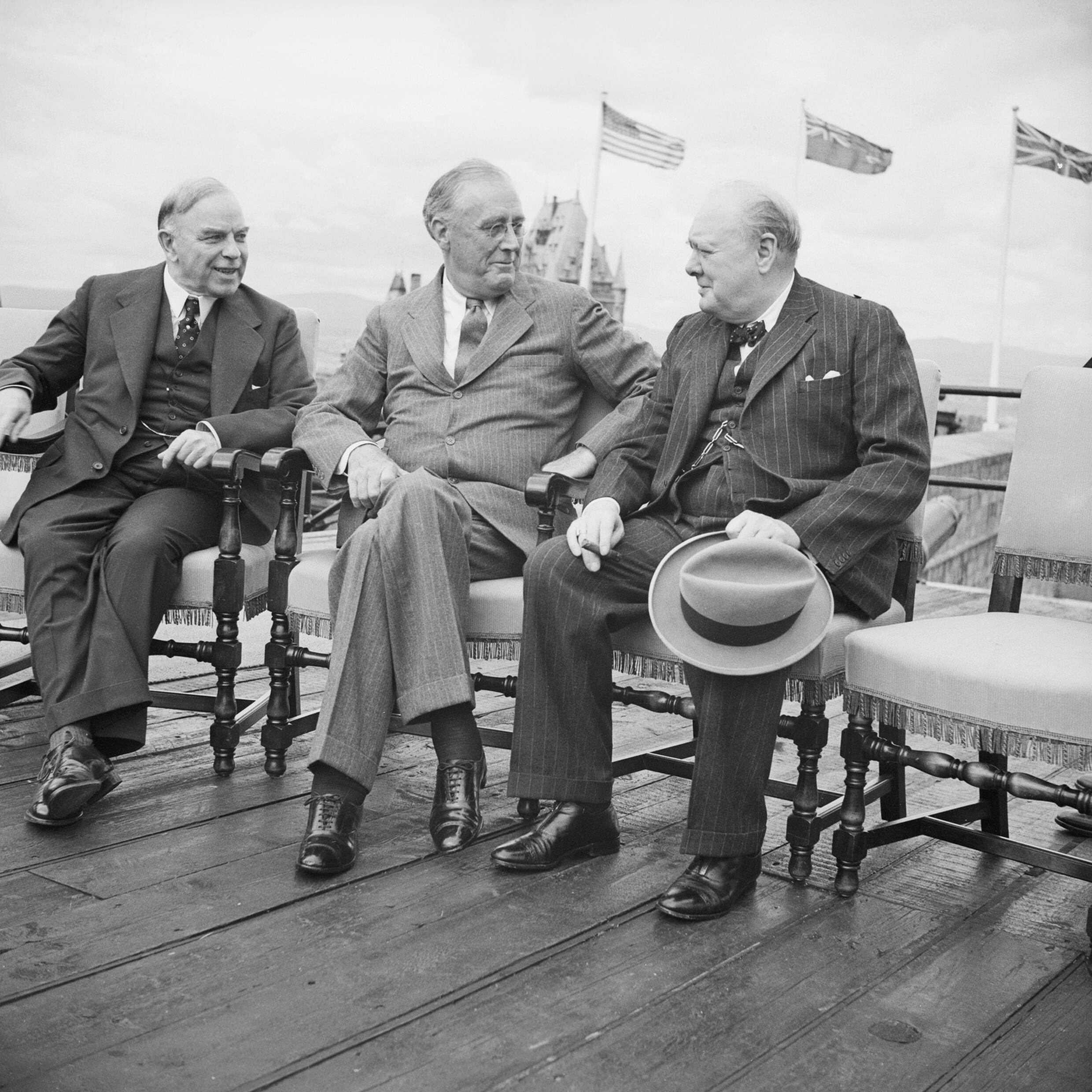
- Mackenzie King, Franklin D. Roosevelt and Winston Churchill at the Quebec Conference in August 1943
- Signed: 19 August 1943
- Location: Quebec City, Quebec, Canada
- Effective: 19 August 1943
- Expiration: 7 January 1948
- Signatories: Winston Churchill (UK); Franklin D. Roosevelt (US)

The Quebec Agreement was a secret agreement between the United Kingdom and the United States outlining the terms for the coordinated development of the science and engineering related to nuclear energy and specifically nuclear weapons. It was signed by Winston Churchill and Franklin D. Roosevelt on 19 August 1943, during World War II, at the First Quebec Conference in Quebec City, Quebec, Canada.

The Quebec Agreement stipulated that the US and UK would pool their resources to develop nuclear weapons, and that neither country would use them against the other, or against other countries without mutual consent, or pass information about them to other countries. It also gave the United States a veto over post-war British commercial or industrial uses of nuclear energy. The agreement merged the British Tube Alloys project with the American Manhattan Project, and created the Combined Policy Committee to control the joint project. Although Canada was not a signatory, the Agreement provided for a Canadian representative on the Combined Policy Committee in view of Canada's contribution to the effort.

British scientists performed important work as part of the British contribution to the Manhattan Project, and in July 1945 British permission required by the agreement was given for the use of nuclear weapons against Japan. The September 1944 Hyde Park Aide-Mémoire extended Anglo-American co-operation into the post-war period, but after the war ended, American enthusiasm for the alliance with Britain waned. The McMahon Act (1946) ended technical co-operation through its control of "restricted data". On 7 January 1948, the Quebec Agreement was superseded by a modus vivendi, an agreement which allowed for limited sharing of technical information between the United States, Britain and Canada.

== Background ==
=== Tube Alloys ===
The neutron was discovered by James Chadwick at the Cavendish Laboratory at the University of Cambridge in February 1932. In April 1932, his Cavendish colleagues John Cockcroft and Ernest Walton split lithium atoms with accelerated protons. Then, in December 1938, Otto Hahn and Fritz Strassmann at Hahn's laboratory in Berlin-Dahlem bombarded uranium with slowed neutrons, and discovered that barium had been produced. Hahn wrote to his colleague Lise Meitner, who, with her nephew Otto Frisch, explained that the uranium nucleus had been split. By analogy with the division of biological cells, they named the process "fission".

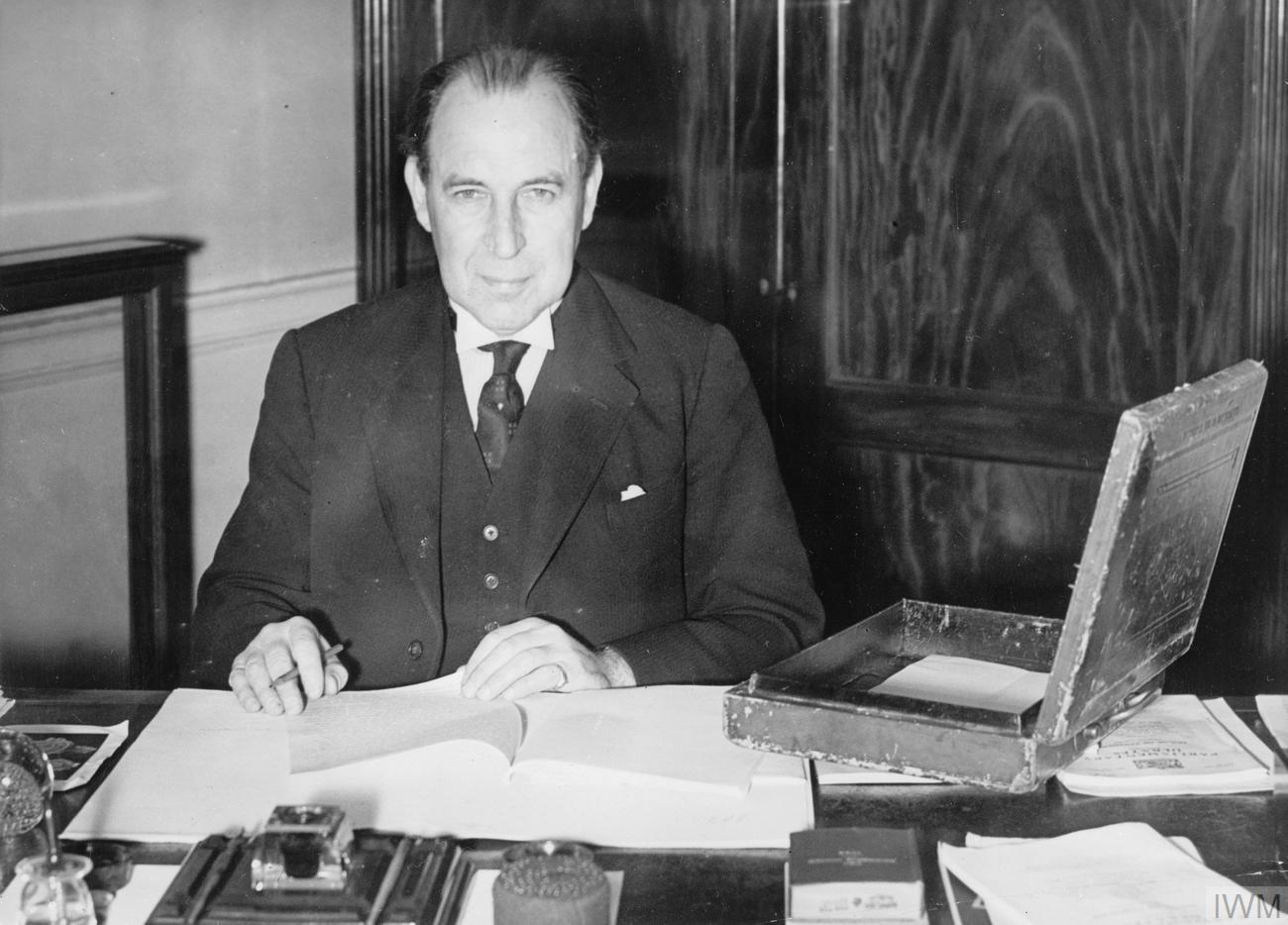
Sir John Anderson, the minister responsible for Tube Alloys

The discovery of fission raised the possibility that an extremely powerful atomic bomb could be created. The term was already familiar to the British public through the writings of H. G. Wells, in his 1913 novel The World Set Free. Sir Henry Tizard's Committee on the Scientific Survey of Air Defence was originally formed to study the needs of anti-aircraft warfare, but branched out to study air warfare generally. In May 1939, a few months before the outbreak of the Second World War in Europe in September 1939, it was directed to conduct research into the feasibility of atomic bombs. Tizard tasked George Paget Thomson, the professor of physics at Imperial College London, and Mark Oliphant, an Australian physicist at the University of Birmingham, with carrying out a series of experiments on uranium. By February 1940, Thomson's team had failed to create a chain reaction in natural uranium, and he had decided that it was not worth pursuing.

Oliphant's team reached a strikingly different conclusion. He had delegated the task to two German refugee scientists, Rudolf Peierls and Frisch, who could not work on the university's secret projects like radar because they were enemy aliens, and therefore lacked the necessary security clearance. They calculated the critical mass of a metallic sphere of pure uranium-235, and found that instead of tons, as everyone had assumed, as little as 1 to 10 kilograms (2.2 to 22.0 lb) would suffice, and would explode with the power of thousands of tons of dynamite.

Oliphant took the Frisch–Peierls memorandum to Tizard. As a result, the MAUD Committee was established to investigate further. It directed an intensive research effort. Four universities provided the locations where the experiments were taking place. The University of Birmingham undertook theoretical work, such as determining what size of critical mass was needed for an explosion. This group was run by Peierls, with the help of fellow German refugee scientist Klaus Fuchs. The laboratories at the University of Liverpool and the University of Oxford experimented with different types of isotope separation. Chadwick's group at Liverpool dealt with thermal diffusion, a phenomenon observed in mixtures of mobile particles where the different particle types exhibit different responses to the force of a temperature gradient. Francis Simon's group at Oxford investigated the gaseous diffusion, which works on the principle that at differing pressures uranium 235 would diffuse through a barrier faster than uranium 238. This was determined to be the most promising method. Egon Bretscher and Norman Feather's group at Cambridge investigated whether another element, now called plutonium, could be used as a fissile material. Because of the presence of a team of refugee French scientists led by Hans von Halban, Oxford also had the world's main supply of heavy water, which helped them theorise how uranium could be used for power.

In July 1941, the MAUD Committee produced two comprehensive reports that concluded that an atomic bomb was not only technically feasible, but could be produced before the war ended, perhaps in as little as two years. The MAUD Committee unanimously recommended pursuing its development as a matter of urgency, although it recognised that the resources required might be beyond those available to Britain. But even before its report was completed, the Prime Minister, Winston Churchill, had been briefed on its findings by his scientific advisor, Frederick Lindemann, and had decided on a course of action. A new directorate known by the deliberately misleading name of Tube Alloys was created to co-ordinate this effort. Sir John Anderson, the Lord President of the Council, became the minister responsible, and Wallace Akers from Imperial Chemical Industries (ICI) was appointed its director.

=== Early American efforts ===
The prospect of Germany developing an atomic bomb was also of great concern to scientists in the United States, particularly those who were refugees from Nazi Germany and other fascist countries. In July 1939, Leo Szilard and Albert Einstein had written a letter warning the President of the United States, Franklin D. Roosevelt, of the danger. In response, Roosevelt created an Advisory Committee on Uranium in October 1939, chaired by Lyman Briggs of the National Bureau of Standards. Research concentrated on slow fission for power production, but with a growing interest in isotope separation. On 12 June 1940, Vannevar Bush, the president of the Carnegie Institution of Washington, and Harry Hopkins, a key advisor to the president, went to the president with a proposal to create a National Defense Research Committee (NDRC) to co-ordinate defence-related research. The NDRC was formally created on 27 June 1940, with Bush as its chairman. It absorbed the Advisory Committee on Uranium which had gone beyond its original role and was now directing research. It became the Uranium Committee of the NDRC.

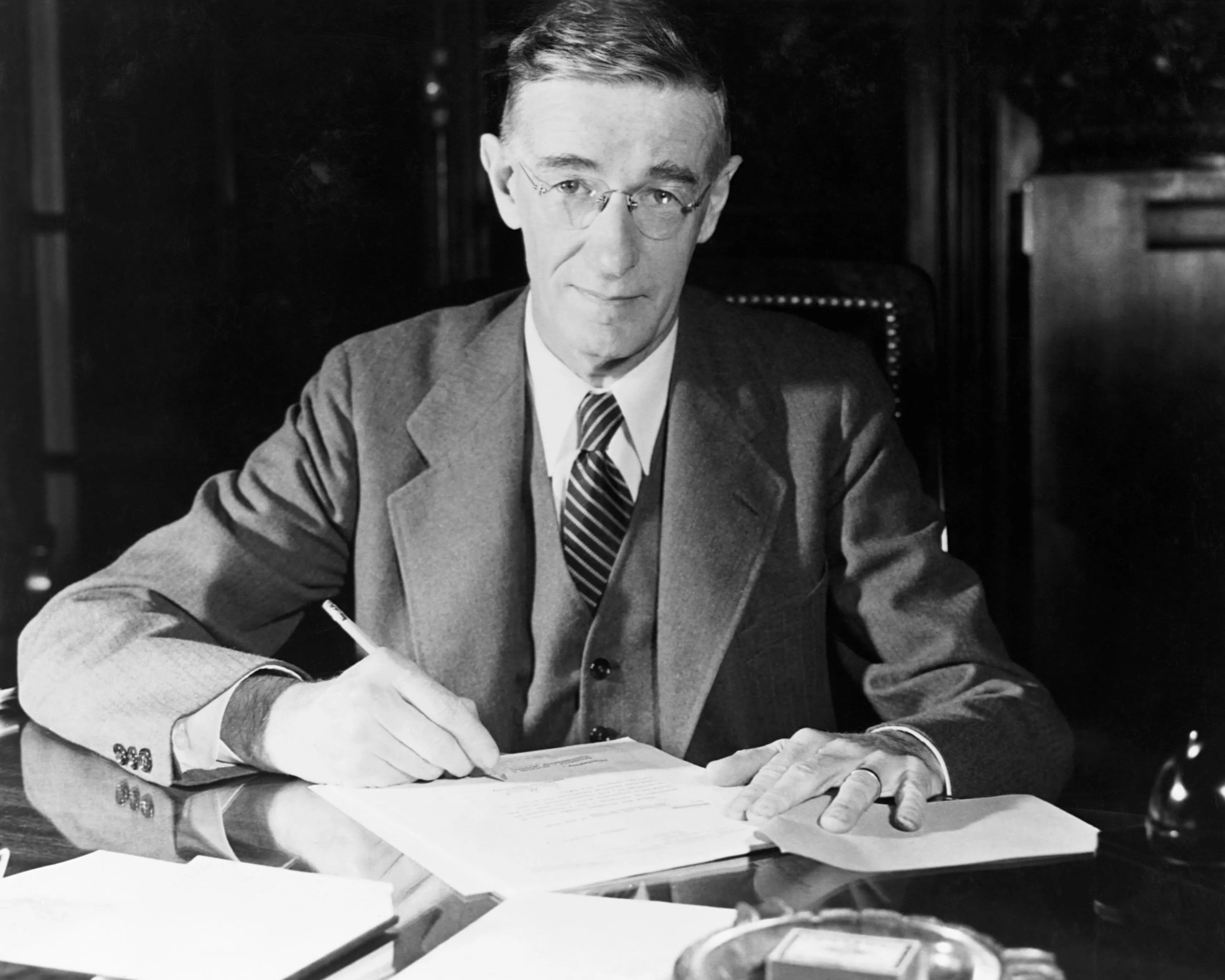
Vannevar Bush, Director of the US Office of Scientific Research and Development

One of Bush's first actions as the chairman of the NDRC was to arrange a clandestine meeting with Air Commodore George Pirie, the British air attaché in Washington, and Brigadier Charles Lindemann, the British Army attaché (and Frederick Lindemann's brother), to discuss a British offer of a full exchange of technical information. Bush was strongly in favour of this proposal, and at their meeting on 8 July 1940, he offered advice on how it should be presented. It was endorsed at a Cabinet meeting on 11 July, and an official acceptance was conveyed to Lord Lothian, the British Ambassador to the United States, on 29 July.

Among the wealth of information that the Tizard Mission, a scientific mission sent to the United States to promote the exchange of military science and technology, brought to America were details about the MAUD Committee's deliberations and activities. Some information from the MAUD Committee had already been conveyed to the United States by Ralph H. Fowler, the British scientific attaché to Canada. Cockcroft, a member of the Tizard Mission, brought more. Cockcroft and Fowler met with the Uranium Committee, but the information flow was largely one-way. Cockcroft reported that the American atomic bomb project lagged behind the British, and was not proceeding as fast. Work conducted in America included research by Szilard and Enrico Fermi at Columbia University into the possibility of a controlled nuclear chain reaction; preliminary investigations into isotope separation using centrifugation, gaseous diffusion and thermal diffusion processes; and efforts to produce plutonium in the cyclotron at the Radiation Laboratory at the University of California.

Kenneth Bainbridge from Harvard University attended a MAUD Committee meeting on 9 April 1941, and was surprised to discover that the British were convinced that an atomic bomb was technically feasible. The Uranium Committee met at Harvard on 5 May, and Bainbridge presented his report. Bush engaged a group headed by Arthur Compton, a Nobel laureate in physics and chairman of the Department of Physics at the University of Chicago, to investigate further. Compton's report, issued on 17 May 1941, did not address the design or manufacture of a bomb in detail. Instead it endorsed a post-war project concentrating on atomic energy for power production. On 28 June 1941, Roosevelt created the Office of Scientific Research and Development (OSRD), with Bush as its director, personally responsible to the president. The new organisation subsumed the NDRC, now chaired by James B. Conant, the President of Harvard University. The Uranium Committee became the Uranium Section of the OSRD, but was soon renamed the S-1 Section for security reasons.

Britain was at war, but the US was not. Oliphant flew to the United States in late August 1941, ostensibly to discuss the radar programme, but actually to find out why the United States was ignoring the MAUD Committee's findings. He discovered to his dismay that the reports and other documents sent directly to Briggs had not been shared with all members of the committee; Briggs had locked them in a safe. Oliphant then met with William D. Coolidge, who was acting in Compton's place while the latter was in South America; Samuel K. Allison, a colleague of Compton's at the University of Chicago; Ernest O. Lawrence, the director of the Radiation Laboratory; Fermi and Conant to explain the urgency. In these meetings he spoke of an atomic bomb with forcefulness and certainty. Allison recalled that when Oliphant met with the S-1 Section, he "came to a meeting, and said 'bomb' in no uncertain terms. He told us we must concentrate every effort on the bomb and said we had no right to work on power plants or anything but the bomb. The bomb would cost $25 million, he said, and Britain did not have the money or the manpower, so it was up to us."

Bush and Conant received the final MAUD Report from Thomson on 3 October 1941. With this in hand, Bush met with Roosevelt and Vice-President Henry A. Wallace at the White House on 9 October 1941, and obtained a commitment to an expanded and expedited American atomic bomb project. Two days later, Roosevelt sent a letter to Churchill in which he proposed that they exchange views "in order that any extended efforts may be coordinated or even jointly conducted."

== Collaboration ==
Roosevelt regarded this offer of a joint project as sufficiently important to have the letter personally delivered by Frederick L. Hovde, the head of the NDRC mission in London, but Churchill did not respond until December. He assured Roosevelt of his willingness to collaborate, and informed him that Hovde had discussed the matter with Sir John Anderson and Lord Cherwell, as Frederick Lindemann was now known. The MAUD Committee had considered the issue of collaboration with the United States, and had concluded that while pilot isotope separation plants could be established in the United Kingdom, full-scale production facilities would have to be built in the United States. The British expressed concerns about the security of the American project. Ironically, it was the British project that had already been penetrated by atomic spies. John Cairncross had given the Soviet Union a copy of the MAUD Committee report. Although not conveyed to the Americans, the British had other concerns about what might happen after the war if the Americans embraced isolationism, as had occurred after the First World War, and Britain had to fight the Soviet Union alone. The opportunity for a joint project was therefore missed. British and American exchange of information continued but their programmes remained separate.

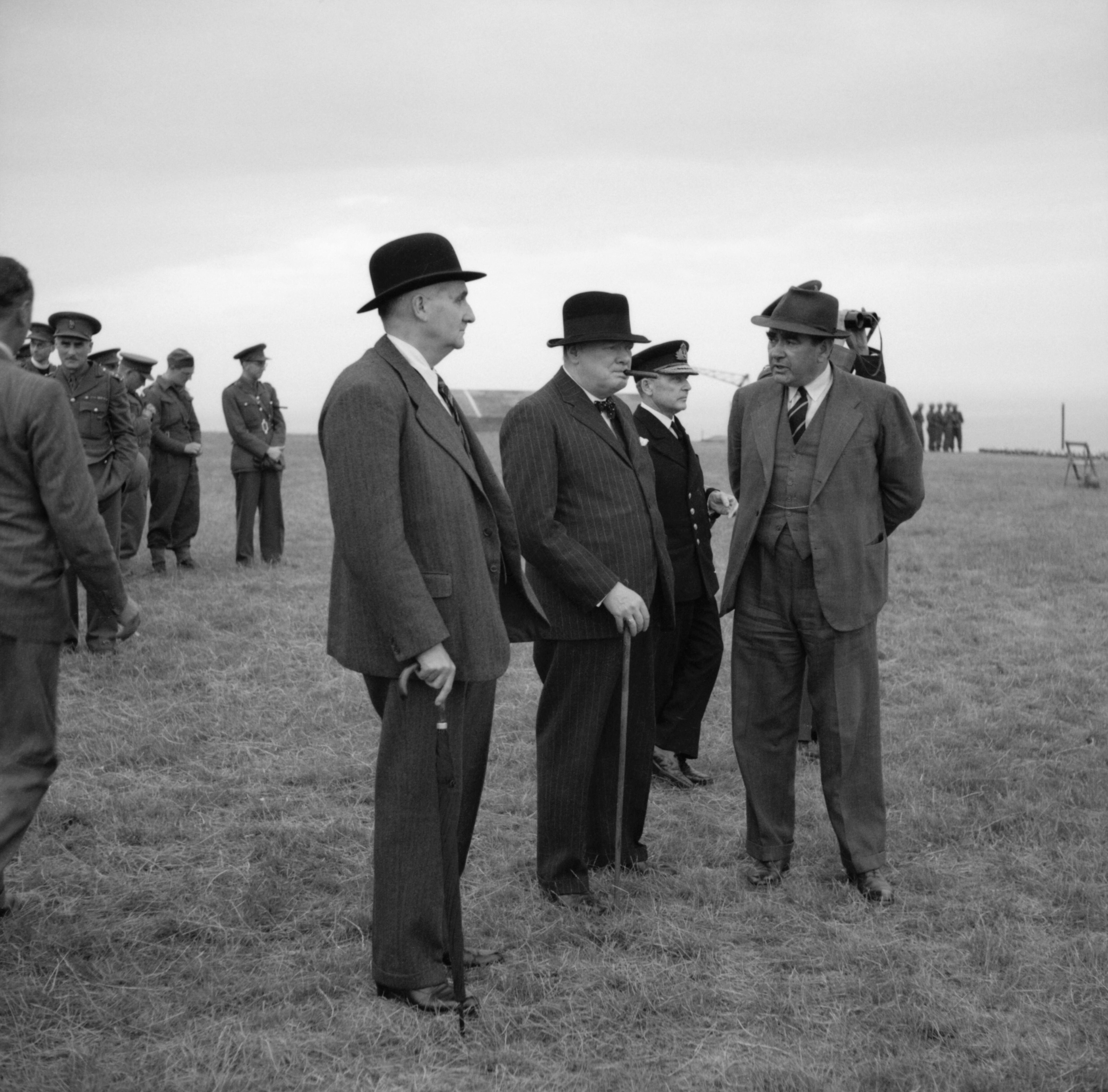
Lord Cherwell (foreground, in bowler hat) was scientific advisor to Winston Churchill (centre)

The Japanese attack on Pearl Harbor on 7 December 1941 led to the United States' entry into the war. Funding now became available in amounts undreamt of the year before. OSRD contracts were due to expire at the end of June 1942, and there was intense wartime competition for raw materials. It was agreed that in 1942–1943, the United States Army would fund $53 million of an $85 million programme. On 18 June 1942, Colonel James C. Marshall was ordered to organise the Army component. He established his headquarters on the 18th floor of 270 Broadway in New York City, with the innocuous name of the Manhattan Engineer District, following the usual practice of naming engineer districts after the city in which its headquarters was located. The project soon adopted the name "Manhattan" as well. By September 1942, Bush and Conant felt that the time had come for the Army to take over, something already approved by the president on 17 June 1942, and Brigadier General Leslie R. Groves, Jr. became the director of the Manhattan Project on 23 September 1942. Groves attempted to tighten security through a policy of strict compartmentalisation similar to the one that the British had imposed on radar.

The American effort soon overtook the British. British scientists who visited the United States in 1942 were astounded at the progress and momentum the Manhattan Project had assumed. On 30 July 1942, Anderson advised Churchill that: "We must face the fact that ... [our] pioneering work ... is a dwindling asset and that, unless we capitalise it quickly, we shall be outstripped. We now have a real contribution to make to a 'merger'. Soon we shall have little or none". But Bush and Conant had already decided that British help was no longer needed. In October 1942, they convinced Roosevelt that the United States should independently develop the atomic bomb, despite the agreement of unrestricted scientific interchange between the US and Britain.

The positions of the two countries were the reverse of what they had been in 1941. American officials were concerned that Akers and other people from ICI involved in the Tube Alloys project were trying to exploit American nuclear scientific knowledge to create a profitable post-war industry. The Secretary of War, Henry L. Stimson, felt that since the United States was doing "ninety percent of the work" on the bomb, it would be "better for us to go along for the present without sharing anything more than we could help". In December 1942, Roosevelt agreed to restricting the flow of information to what Britain could use during the war, even if doing so impeded the American project. The Americans stopped sharing any information on heavy water production, the method of electromagnetic separation, the physical or chemical properties of plutonium, the details of atomic bomb design, or the facts about fast neutron reactions. This adversely impacted the work of the Montreal Laboratory, the joint British and Canadian project that was investigating nuclear reactor design. In retaliation, the British stopped sending scientists to America, slowing the pace of work there, which had relied on British scientists. The Americans then ceased all information sharing.

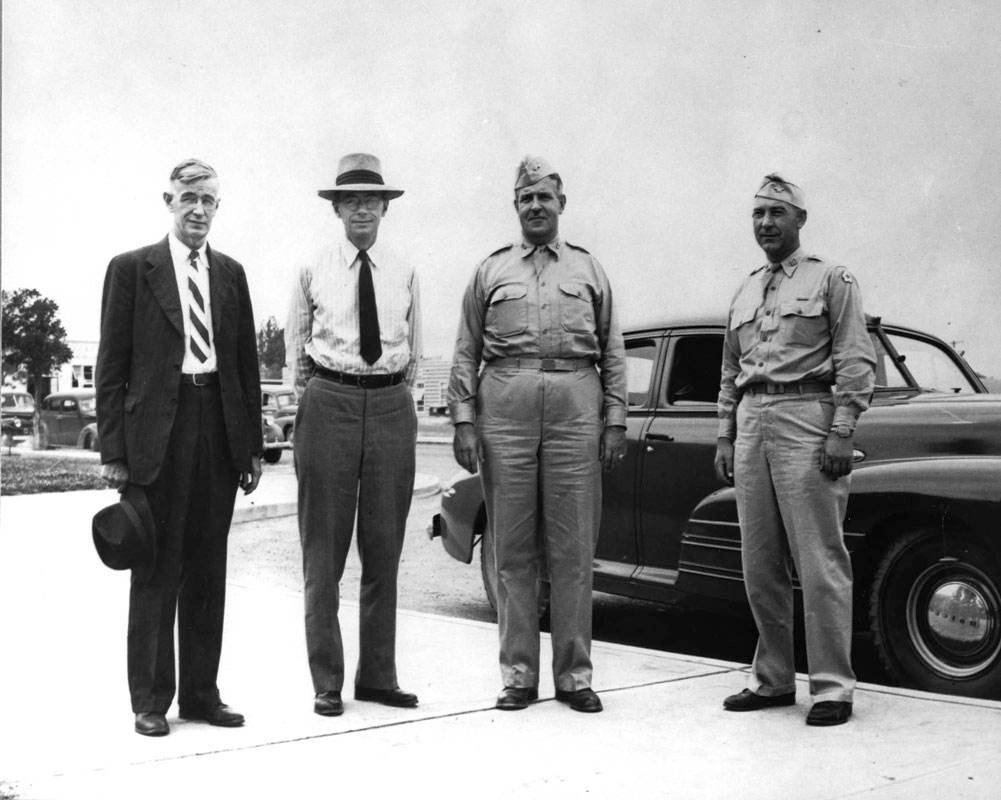
Vannevar Bush, James B. Conant, Leslie Groves and Franklin Matthias

The Tube Alloys Directorate considered whether Britain could produce a bomb without American help. A gaseous diffusion plant to produce 1 kg of weapons-grade uranium per day was estimated to cost up to £3 million in research and development, and anything up to £50 million to build in wartime Britain. A nuclear reactor to produce 1 kg of plutonium per day would have to be built in Canada. It would take up to five years to build and cost £5 million. The project would also require facilities for producing the required heavy water for the reactor costing between £5 million and £10 million, and for producing uranium metal, which would cost another £1.5 million. The project would need overwhelming priority, as it was estimated to require 20,000 workers, many of them highly skilled, 500,000 tons of steel, and 500,000 kW of electricity. Disruption to other wartime projects would be inevitable, and it was unlikely to be ready in time to affect the outcome of the war in Europe. The unanimous response was that before embarking on this, another effort should be made to obtain American co-operation.

By March 1943 Bush and Conant had decided that British help would benefit some areas of the Manhattan Project. In particular, it could benefit enough from assistance from Chadwick and one or two other British scientists to warrant the risk of revealing weapon design secrets. Bush, Conant and Groves wanted Chadwick and Peierls to discuss bomb design with Robert Oppenheimer, and the construction company Kellogg wanted British comments on the design of the gaseous diffusion plant it was building.

== Negotiations ==
Churchill took up the matter with Roosevelt when they met at the Washington Conference on 25 May 1943. A meeting was arranged that afternoon between Cherwell and Bush in Hopkins's office in the White House, with Hopkins looking on. Both stated their respective positions, and Cherwell explained that Britain's post-war interest was in nuclear weapons, and not commercial opportunities. Hopkins reported back to Roosevelt, and Churchill and Roosevelt agreed that information interchange should be reviewed, and that the atomic bomb project should be a joint one. Hopkins sent Churchill a telegram confirming this on 17 June, but American policy did not change, largely because Roosevelt did not inform Bush when they next met on 24 June. When Churchill pressed for action in a telegram on 9 July, Hopkins counselled Roosevelt that "you made a firm commitment to Churchill in regard to this when he was here and there is nothing to do but go through with it."

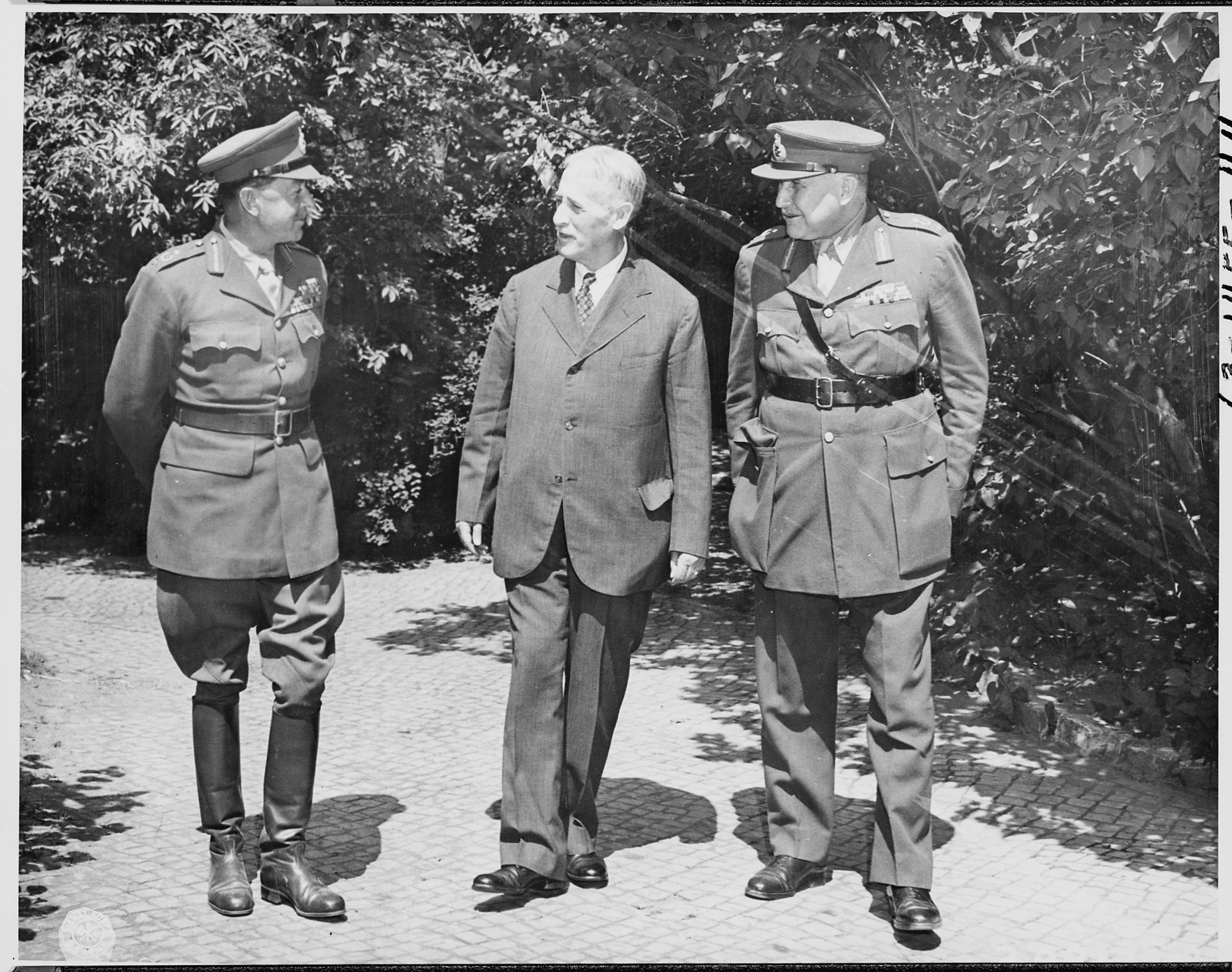
Secretary of War, Henry L. Stimson (centre) with Field Marshals Sir Harold Alexander (left) and Sir Henry Maitland Wilson (right)

Bush was in London on 15 July 1943 to attend a meeting of the British War Cabinet's Anti-U-boat Committee. Sir Stafford Cripps took him to see Churchill who told Bush that the President had given him his word of honour on full co-operation, and that he was incensed at obstruction by American bureaucrats. Bush suggested that he take up the matter with Stimson, who was also in London. Churchill did so on 17 July, and Stimson promised to submit the matter to Roosevelt. On 20 July, Roosevelt wrote to Bush with instructions to "renew, in an inclusive manner, the full exchange with the British Government regarding Tube Alloys", but since Bush was in London, he did not see this letter for another ten days. Stimson, Bush and Stimson's special assistant, Harvey Bundy, met Churchill, Cherwell and Anderson at 10 Downing Street in London on 22 July. None of them was aware that Roosevelt had already made his decision.

Stimson had just finished a series of arguments with the British about the need for an invasion of France. He was reluctant to appear to disagree with them about everything, and, unlike Bush, was sensitive to insinuations that Britain was being unfairly treated. He spoke in conciliatory terms about the need for good post-war relations between the two countries. For his part, Churchill disavowed interest in the commercial applications of nuclear technology. The reason for British concern about the post-war co-operation, they explained, was not commercial concerns, but so that Britain would have nuclear weapons after the war. Bush then proposed a five-point plan, which Stimson promised to put before the president for approval.

Anderson drafted an agreement for full interchange, which Churchill re-worded "in more majestic language". Anderson feared that Groves might tell Stimson and Bush that "like all Americans who come to our misty island, they have been taken in by our hypocritical cunning and carried away by our brilliant Prime Minister". When Conant found out about the agreement, he expressed the opinion that he would feel more at home on the staff of the Chicago Tribune, a newspaper renowned for its anti-British views. Anderson arrived in Washington with the draft on 5 August, and went over it with Conant and Bush. From the American point of view, nothing made it into the final draft that contradicted the existing policy on interchange of information. Anderson extracted one important concession: the creation of the Combined Policy Committee to oversee the joint project with representation from the United States, Britain and Canada. Conant's objections to Anderson's proposed arrangements for information interchange were met by assigning the task to the Combined Policy Committee. Stimson, General George Marshall and Rear Admiral William R. Purnell reviewed the document and made minor changes, and it was then sent to the British Embassy for approval.

== Agreement ==
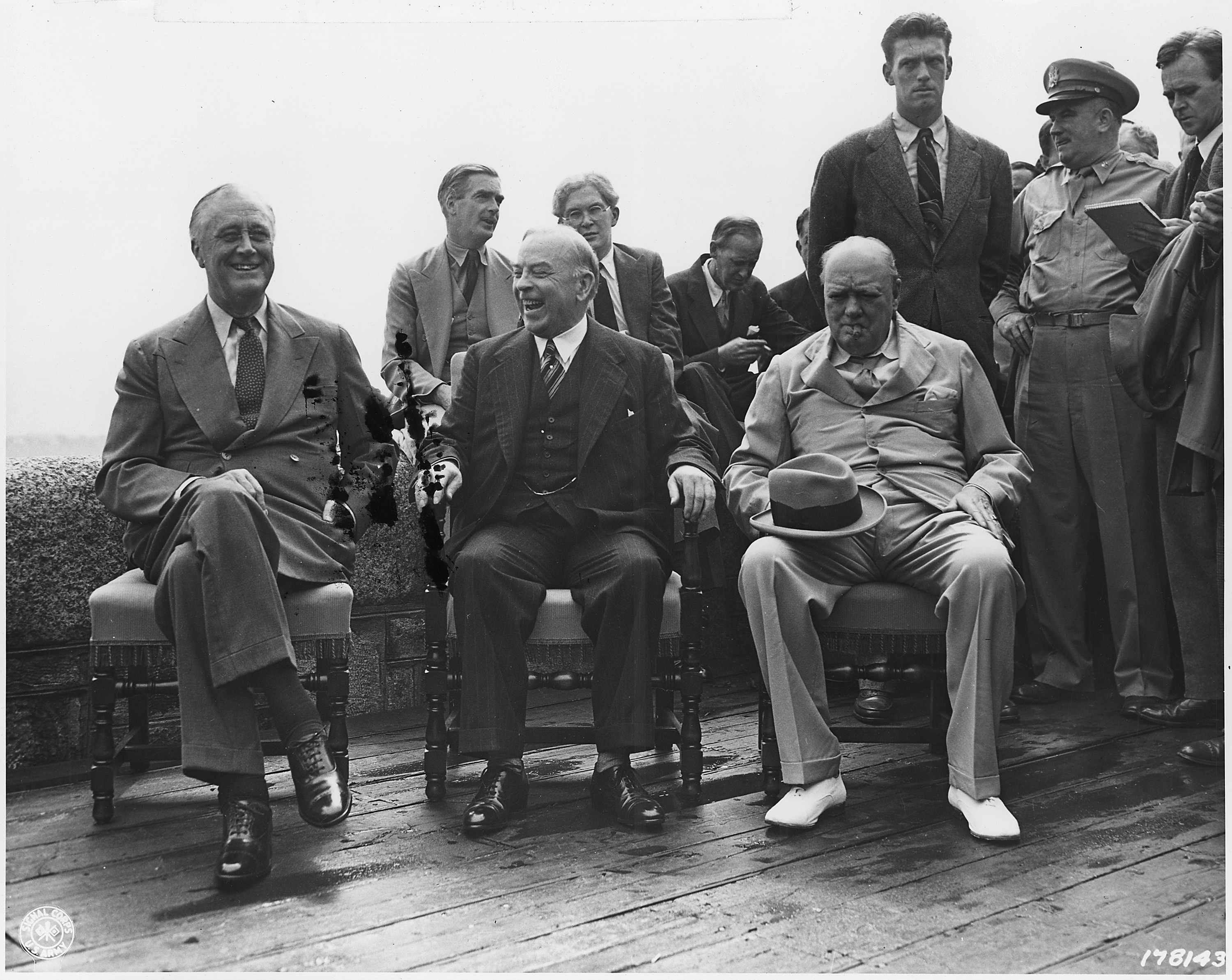
Press Conference at the Citadelle of Quebec during the Quadrant Conference. Left to right: President Franklin D. Roosevelt, Canadian Prime Minister Mackenzie King, and British Prime Minister Winston Churchill. Seated on the wall behind them are Anthony Eden, Brendan Bracken and Harry Hopkins.

A speedy drafting process was required because Roosevelt, Churchill and their political and military advisors converged for the Quadrant Conference at the Citadelle of Quebec on 17 August, hosted by the Prime Minister of Canada, Mackenzie King. Most of the discussions were about the invasion of France. Although the Quebec Agreement was a bilateral one to which Canada was not a signatory, the British felt that Canada's contribution to Tube Alloys was significant enough that high-level representation was appropriate. King was therefore asked to nominate a Canadian member of the Combined Policy Committee, and he selected C. D. Howe, the Canadian Minister of Munitions and Supply. Stimson, Bush and Conant would be the American members, while Field Marshal Sir John Dill and Colonel J. J. Llewellin would be the British members.

On 19 August Roosevelt and Churchill signed the Quebec Agreement, which was typed on four pages of Citadelle notepaper, and formally titled "Articles of Agreement governing collaboration between the authorities of the USA and UK in the matter of Tube Alloys". The United Kingdom and the United States agreed that "it is vital to our common safety in the present War to bring the Tube Alloys project to fruition at the earliest moment", and that this was best accomplished by pooling their resources. The Quebec Agreement stipulated that:

1. The US and UK would pool their resources to develop nuclear weapons with a free exchange of information;
2. Neither country would use them against the other;
3. Neither country would use them against other countries without consent;
4. Neither country would pass information about them to other countries without consent;
5. That "in view of the heavy burden of production falling, upon the United States", the President might limit post-war British commercial or industrial uses of atomic energy.

The only part of the Quebec Agreement that troubled Stimson was the requirement for mutual consent before atomic bombs could be used. Had Congress known about it, they would never have supported it. The American veto over post-war British commercial and industrial uses made it clear that Britain was the junior partner in the Grand Alliance. Churchill in particular considered the Quebec Agreement to be the best deal he could have struck under the circumstances, and the restrictions were the price he had to pay to obtain the technical information needed for a successful post-war nuclear weapons project. Margaret Gowing noted that the "idea of the independent deterrent was already well entrenched."

The Quebec Agreement was a secret agreement. Its terms were known to but a few insiders, and its very existence was not revealed to the United States Congress. The Joint Committee on Atomic Energy was given an oral summary on 12 May 1947. On 12 February 1951, Churchill wrote to President Harry S. Truman for permission to publish it, but Truman declined. Churchill therefore omitted it from his memoir, Closing the Ring (1951). It remained a secret until Churchill read it out in the House of Commons on 5 April 1954. However, on 4 September 1943 the Soviet atomic spy Ursula Kuczynski ("Sonia") reported details of the agreement to the GRU in Moscow, which she had probably obtained from Fuchs.

== Implementation ==
Even before the Quebec Agreement was signed, Akers had already cabled London with instructions that Chadwick, Peierls, Oliphant and Simon should leave immediately for North America. They arrived on 19 August, the day it was signed, expecting to be able to talk to American scientists, but were unable to do so. Two weeks passed before American officials learned of the contents of the Quebec Agreement. Bush told Akers that his action was premature, and that the Combined Policy Committee would first have to agree on the rules governing the employment of British scientists. With nothing to do, the scientists returned to the UK. Groves briefed the OSRD S-1 Executive Committee, which had replaced the S-1 Committee on 19 June 1942, at a special meeting on 10 September 1943. The text of the Quebec Agreement was vague in places, with loopholes that Groves could exploit to enforce compartmentalisation. Negotiations on the terms of technical interchange dragged on until December 1943. The new procedures went into effect on 14 December with the approval of the Military Policy Committee (which governed the Manhattan Project) and the Combined Policy Committee. By this time British scientists had already commenced working in the United States.

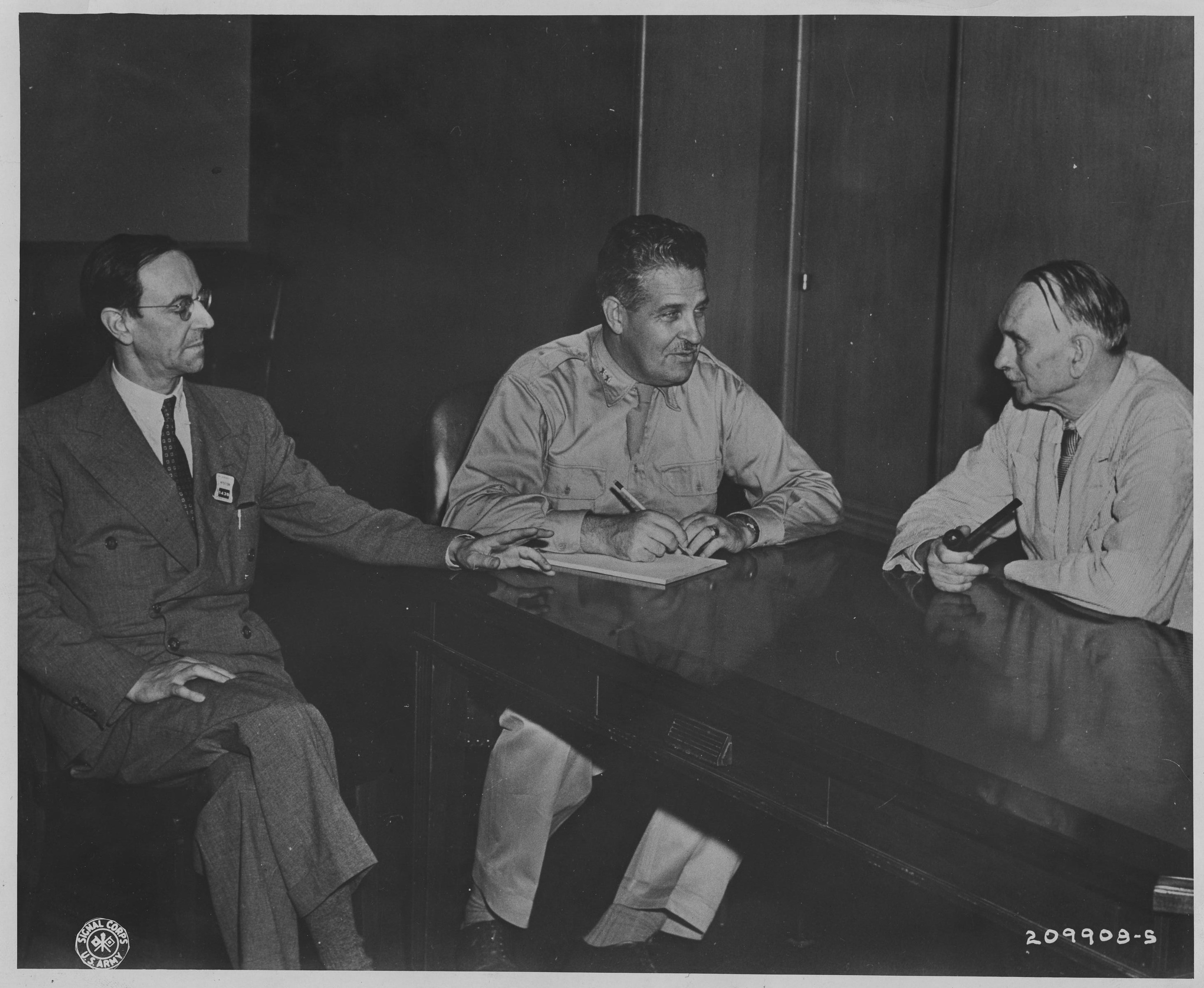
James Chadwick, Leslie R. Groves, Jr., and Richard C. Tolman

Over the next two years, the Combined Policy Committee met only eight times. The first occasion was on the afternoon of 8 September 1943; Stimson discovered that he was the chairman only that morning. This first meeting established a Technical Subcommittee chaired by American Major General Wilhelm D. Styer. The Americans did not want Akers on the Technical Subcommittee due to his ICI background, so Llewellin nominated Chadwick, whom he also wanted to be Head of the British Mission to the Manhattan Project. The other members of the Technical Committee were Richard C. Tolman, who was Groves's scientific advisor, and C. J. Mackenzie, the president of the Canadian National Research Council. It was agreed that the Technical Committee could act without consulting the Combined Policy Committee whenever its decision was unanimous. It held its first meeting at The Pentagon on 10 September 1943.

There remained the issue of co-operation between the Manhattan Project's Metallurgical Laboratory in Chicago and the Montreal Laboratory. At the Combined Policy Committee meeting on 17 February 1944, Chadwick pressed for resources to build a nuclear reactor at what is now known as the Chalk River Laboratories. Britain and Canada agreed to pay the cost of this project, but the United States had to supply the heavy water. Because it was unlikely to have any impact on the war, Conant in particular was cool about the proposal, but heavy water reactors were still of great interest. Groves was willing to support the effort and supply the heavy water required, but with certain restrictions. The Montreal Laboratory would have access to data from the Metallurgical Laboratory's research reactors at Argonne and the X-10 Graphite Reactor at Oak Ridge, but not from the production reactors at the Hanford Site; nor would they be given any information about the chemistry of plutonium, or of methods for separating it from other elements. This arrangement was formally approved by the Combined Policy Committee meeting on 19 September 1944.

Chadwick supported the British contribution to the Manhattan Project to the fullest extent, abandoning any hopes of a British project during the war. With Churchill's backing, he attempted to ensure that every request from Groves for assistance was honoured. While the pace of research eased as the war entered its final phase, scientists were still in great demand, and it fell to Anderson, Cherwell and Sir Edward Appleton, the Permanent Secretary of the Department of Scientific and Industrial Research, which was responsible for Tube Alloys, to prise them away from the wartime projects in which they were invariably engaged. A British Mission led by Akers assisted in the development of gaseous diffusion technology in New York. Another, led by Oliphant, who acted as deputy director at the Berkeley Radiation Laboratory, assisted with the electromagnetic separation process. As head of the British Mission to the Los Alamos Laboratory, Chadwick, and later Peierls, led a multinational team of distinguished scientists that included Sir Geoffrey Taylor, James Tuck, Niels Bohr, William Penney, Frisch, and Fuchs. Four members of the British Mission became group leaders at Los Alamos. Penney observed the bombing of Nagasaki on 9 August 1945 and participated in the Operation Crossroads nuclear tests in 1946.

A major strain on the Agreement came up in 1944, when it was revealed to the United States that the United Kingdom had made a secret agreement with Hans von Halban to share nuclear information with France after the war in exchange for free use of patents related to nuclear reactors filed by French physicist Frédéric Joliot-Curie and his Collège de France team. Upon this revelation, the United States and Canada objected, stating that the Halban agreement violated the terms of the Quebec Agreement, namely the section about third-party information-sharing without prior mutual consent. The United Kingdom broke its obligations to France in order to satisfy the United States. Anderson was extremely concerned about alienating the French, and he and the Secretary of State for Foreign Affairs, Anthony Eden, suggested that the French be offered an undertaking that France would subsequently be included in the Manhattan Project, but Churchill did not agree, and remained adamantly opposed to any disclosures to France or the Soviet Union. After the war, the French government repudiated the Halban agreement.

The issue of patent rights was a complex one, and attempts to negotiate deals between Britain and the United States in 1942, and between Britain and Canada in 1943, had failed. After the Quebec Agreement was signed, British and American experts sat down together again and hammered out an agreement, which was endorsed by the Combined Policy Committee in September 1944. This agreement, which also covered Canada, was retrospective to the signing of the Quebec Agreement in August 1943, but owing to necessary secrecy, was not finalised until 1956, and covered all patents held in November 1955. Each of the three countries agreed to transfer to the others any rights it held in the others' countries, and waive any claims for compensation against them.

Llewellin returned to the United Kingdom at the end of 1943 and was replaced on the committee by Sir Ronald Ian Campbell, the deputy head of the British Mission to the United States, who in turn was replaced by the British Ambassador to the United States, Lord Halifax, in early 1945. Dill died in Washington on 4 November 1944, and was replaced both as Chief of the British Joint Staff Mission and as a member of the Combined Policy Committee by Field Marshal Sir Henry Maitland Wilson. It was therefore Wilson who, on 4 July 1945, under the clause of the Quebec Agreement that specified that nuclear weapons would not be used against another country without mutual consent, agreed that the use of nuclear weapons against Japan would be recorded as a decision of the Combined Policy Committee.

== Hyde Park Aide-Mémoire ==
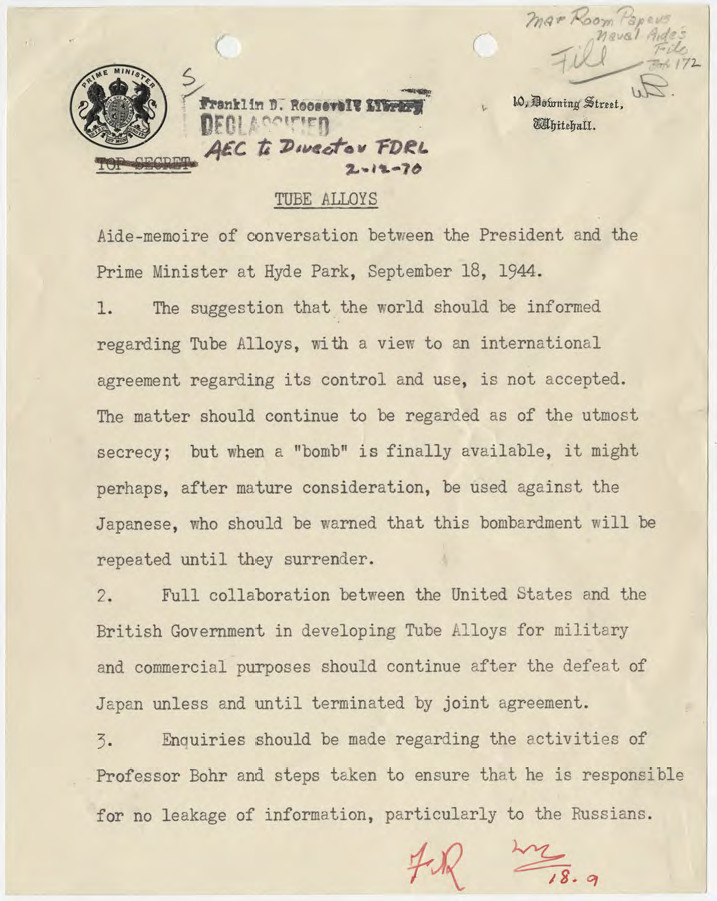
The Hyde Park Aide-Mémoire. This copy is in the Franklin D. Roosevelt Presidential Library and Museum. (Note: The aide-mémoire was initialled in duplicate. On the copy kept by the British Government there is a marginal notation by Churchill's Principal Private Secretary: "actually 19th J[ohn] M[iller] M[artin].")

In September 1944, a second wartime conference was held in Quebec known as the Octagon Conference. In the wake of a string of Allied victories, thoughts turned to post-war planning. Afterwards, Roosevelt and Churchill spent some time together at Roosevelt's Springwood estate in Hyde Park, New York. They discussed post-war collaboration on nuclear weapons, and on 19 September signed the Hyde Park Aide-Mémoire, detailing the agreement resulting from what they discussed. Most of this dealt with Bohr's thoughts on international control, but it also provided that "[f]ull collaboration between the United States and the British Government in developing Tube Alloys for military and commercial purposes should continue after the defeat of Japan unless and until terminated by joint agreement."

Of Roosevelt's advisors, only Hopkins and Admiral William D. Leahy knew of this secret wartime agreement, and Leahy, possibly because he never believed that the atomic bomb would work, and was therefore perhaps not paying much attention, had only a muddled recollection of what had been said. When Wilson raised the Hyde Park Aide-Mémoire in a Combined Policy Committee meeting in June 1945, the American copy could not be found. The British sent Stimson a photocopy on 18 July. Even then, Groves questioned the document's authenticity until the American copy was located many years later in the papers of Vice Admiral Wilson Brown, Jr., Roosevelt's naval aide, apparently misfiled in Roosevelt's Hyde Park papers by someone unaware of what Tube Alloys was, and who thought it had something to do with naval guns or boiler tubes.

== End of the Quebec Agreement ==
Truman, who had succeeded Roosevelt on the latter's death on 12 April 1945, Clement Attlee, who had replaced Churchill as prime minister in July 1945, Anderson and United States Secretary of State James F. Byrnes conferred while on a boat cruise on the Potomac River, and agreed to revise the Quebec Agreement, with a view to replacing it with a looser form of co-operation on nuclear matters between the three governments. Groves, Secretary of War Robert P. Patterson and Patterson's advisor George L. Harrison met with a British delegation consisting of Anderson, Wilson, Malcolm MacDonald, the High Commissioner to Canada, Roger Makins from the British Embassy in Washington, and Denis Rickett, Anderson's assistant, on 15 November 1945 to draw up a communiqué. They agreed to retain the Combined Policy Committee. The Quebec Agreement's requirement for "mutual consent" before using nuclear weapons was replaced with one for "prior consultation", and there was to be "full and effective cooperation in the field of atomic energy", but in the longer Memorandum of Intention, signed by Groves and Anderson, this was only "in the field of basic scientific research". Patterson took the communiqué to the White House, where Truman and Attlee signed it on 16 November 1945. A draft agreement was approved by the Combined Policy Committee on 4 December 1945 as the basis for the revocation of the Quebec Agreement.

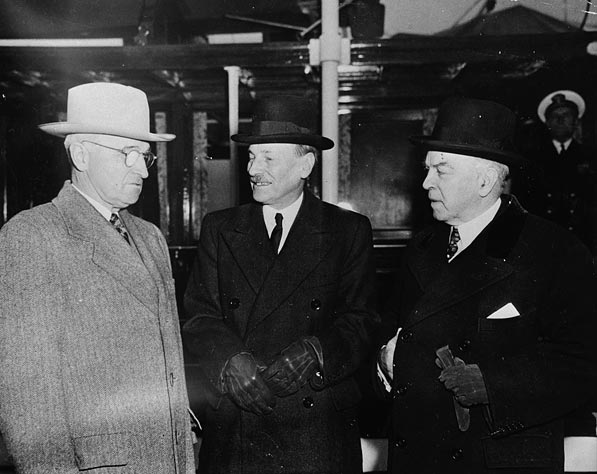
President Harry Truman and prime ministers Clement Attlee and Mackenzie King board the USS Sequoia for discussions about nuclear weapons, November 1945

The next meeting of the Combined Policy Committee on 15 April 1946 produced no accord on collaboration, and resulted in an exchange of cables between Truman and Attlee. Truman cabled on 20 April that he did not see the communiqué he had signed as obligating the United States to assist Britain in designing, constructing and operating an atomic energy plant. Attlee's response on 6 June 1946 "did not mince words nor conceal his displeasure behind the nuances of diplomatic language." At issue was not just technical co-operation, which was fast disappearing, but the allocation of uranium ore. During the war this was of little concern, as Britain had not needed any ore, so all the production of the Congo mines and all the ore seized by the Alsos Mission had gone to the United States, but now it was also required by the British atomic project. Chadwick and Groves reached an agreement by which ore would be shared equally.

The defection of Igor Gouzenko and the resulting espionage conviction of Alan Nunn May, a British physicist who had worked at the Montreal Laboratory, made it politically impossible for US officials to exchange information with the UK. Congress, unaware of the Hyde Park Aide-Mémoire because of the loss of the American copy, enacted the McMahon Act. Signed by Truman on 1 August 1946, and in effect from midnight on 1 January 1947, this law ended technical co-operation. Its control of "restricted data" prevented the United States' allies from receiving any information. The remaining scientists were denied access to papers that they had written just days before. The McMahon Act fuelled resentment from British scientists and officials alike, and led directly to the British decision in January 1947 to develop its own nuclear weapons. In the United States, there was a furore over the British veto over the use of nuclear weapons when the Joint Committee on Atomic Energy was informed of the Quebec Agreement (but not the November 1945 agreement) on 12 May 1947, resulting in intense pressure on Truman to drop the provision. On 7 January 1948, Bush, James Fisk, Cockcroft and Mackenzie concluded an agreement known as the modus vivendi, that allowed for limited sharing of technical information between the United States, Britain and Canada, which officially repealed the Quebec Agreement. Like the Quebec Agreement it replaced, the modus vivendi was classified "Top Secret".

As the Cold War set in, enthusiasm in the United States for an alliance with Britain cooled as well. A September 1949 poll found that 72 per cent of Americans agreed that the United States should not "share our atomic energy secrets with England". The reputation of the British was further tarnished by the 1950 revelation that Fuchs was a Soviet atomic spy. British wartime participation in the Manhattan Project provided a substantial body of expertise that was crucial to the success of High Explosive Research, the United Kingdom's post-war nuclear weapons programme, although it was not without important gaps, such as in the field of plutonium metallurgy. The development of the independent British nuclear deterrent led to the McMahon Act being amended in 1958, and to a resumption of the nuclear Special Relationship between America and Britain under the 1958 US–UK Mutual Defence Agreement.
