= MAUD Committee =

British nuclear weapons research group, 1940–1941

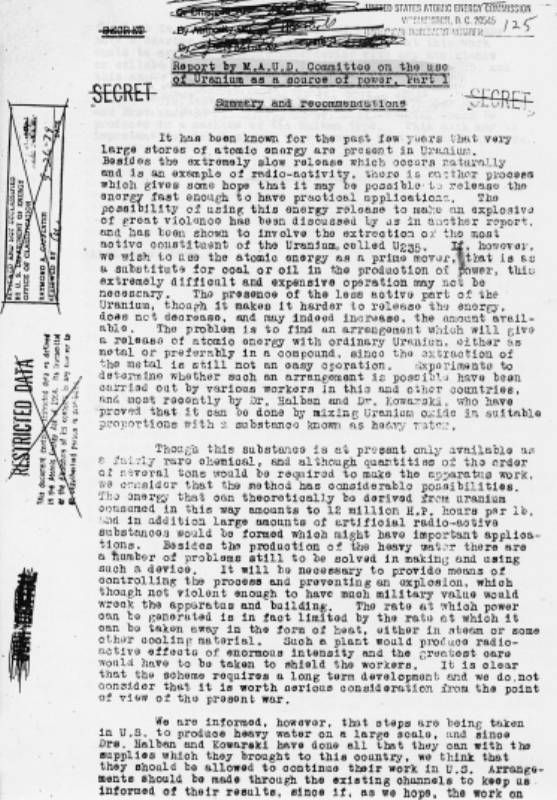
The first page of the MAUD Committee report, March 1941

The MAUD Committee was a British scientific working group formed during the Second World War. It was established to perform the research required to determine if an atomic bomb was feasible. The name MAUD came from a strange line in a telegram from Danish physicist Niels Bohr referring to his housekeeper, Maud Ray.

The MAUD Committee was founded in response to the Frisch–Peierls memorandum, which was written in March 1940 by Rudolf Peierls and Otto Frisch, two physicists who were refugees from Nazi Germany working at the University of Birmingham under the direction of Mark Oliphant. The memorandum argued that a small sphere of pure uranium-235 could have the explosive power of thousands of tons of TNT.

The chairman of the MAUD Committee was George Thomson. Research was split among four different universities: the University of Birmingham, University of Liverpool, University of Cambridge and the University of Oxford, each having a separate programme director. Various means of uranium enrichment were examined, as was nuclear reactor design, the properties of uranium-235, the use of the then-hypothetical element plutonium, and theoretical aspects of nuclear weapon design.

After fifteen months of work, the research culminated in two reports, "Use of Uranium for a Bomb" and "Use of Uranium as a Source of Power", known collectively as the MAUD Report. The report discussed the feasibility and necessity of an atomic bomb for the war effort. In response, the British created a nuclear weapons project, code named Tube Alloys. The MAUD Report was made available to the United States, where it energised the American effort, which eventually became the Manhattan Project. The report was also revealed to the Soviet Union by its atomic spies, and helped start the Soviet atomic bomb project.

== Origins ==
=== The discovery of nuclear fission ===
The neutron was discovered by James Chadwick at the Cavendish Laboratory at the University of Cambridge in February 1932. Two months later, his Cavendish colleagues John Cockcroft and Ernest Walton split lithium atoms with accelerated protons. In December 1938, Otto Hahn and Fritz Strassmann at Hahn's laboratory in Berlin-Dahlem bombarded uranium with slow neutrons, and discovered that barium had been produced. Hahn wrote to his colleague Lise Meitner, who, with her nephew Otto Frisch, proved that the uranium nucleus had been split. They published their finding in Nature in 1939. This phenomenon was a new type of nuclear disintegration, and was more powerful than any seen before. Frisch and Meitner calculated that the energy released by each disintegration was approximately 200 megaelectronvolts [MeV] (32 pJ). By analogy with the division of biological cells, they named the process "fission".

Niels Bohr and John A. Wheeler applied the liquid drop model developed by Bohr and Fritz Kalckar to explain the mechanism of nuclear fission. Bohr had an epiphany that the fission at low energies was principally due to the uranium-235 isotope, while at high energies it was mainly due to the more abundant uranium-238 isotope. The former makes up just 0.7% of natural uranium, while the latter accounts for 99.3%. Frédéric Joliot-Curie and his Paris colleagues Hans von Halban and Lew Kowarski raised the possibility of a nuclear chain reaction in a paper published in Nature in April 1939. It was apparent to many scientists that, in theory at least, an extremely powerful explosive could be created, although most still considered an atomic bomb an impossibility. The term was already familiar to the British public through the writings of H. G. Wells, in his 1913 novel The World Set Free.

=== British response ===
In Britain, a number of scientists considered whether an atomic bomb was practical. At the University of Liverpool, Chadwick and the Polish refugee scientist Joseph Rotblat tackled the problem, but their calculations were inconclusive. At Cambridge, Nobel Prize in Physics laureates George Paget Thomson and William Lawrence Bragg wanted the government to take urgent action to acquire uranium ore. The main source of this was the Belgian Congo, and they were worried that it could fall into German hands. Unsure as to how to go about this, they spoke to Sir William Spens, the master of Corpus Christi College, Cambridge. In April 1939, he approached Sir Kenneth Pickthorn, the local Member of Parliament, who took their concerns to the Secretary of the Committee of Imperial Defence, Major General Hastings Ismay. Ismay in turn asked Sir Henry Tizard for an opinion. Like many scientists, Tizard was sceptical of the likelihood of an atomic bomb being developed, reckoning the odds of success at 100,000 to 1.

Even at such long odds, the danger was sufficiently great to be taken seriously. Lord Chatfield, the Minister for Coordination of Defence, checked with the Treasury and Foreign Office, and found that the Belgian Congo uranium was owned by the Union Minière du Haut Katanga company. Its British vice-president, Lord Stonehaven, arranged a meeting with the Belgian president of the company, Edgar Sengier. Since Union Minière management were friendly towards Britain, it was not considered necessary to immediately acquire the uranium, but Tizard's Committee for the Scientific Survey of Air Warfare (CSSAW) was directed to continue the research into the feasibility of atomic bombs. Thomson, at Imperial College London, and Mark Oliphant, an Australian physicist at the University of Birmingham, were each tasked with carrying out a series of experiments on uranium. By February 1940, Thomson's team had failed to create a chain reaction in natural uranium, and he had decided that it was not worth pursuing.

=== Frisch–Peierls memorandum ===
At Birmingham, Oliphant's team had reached a different conclusion. Oliphant had delegated the task to Frisch and Rudolf Peierls, two German refugee scientists who could not work on Oliphant's radar project because they were enemy aliens, and therefore lacked the requisite security clearance. Francis Perrin had defined a critical mass of uranium to be the smallest amount that could sustain a chain reaction, and had calculated it to be about 40 tonnes (39 long tons; 44 short tons). He reckoned that if a neutron reflector were placed around it, this might be reduced to 12 tonnes (12 long tons; 13 short tons). In a theoretical paper written in 1939, Peierls attempted to simplify the problem by using the fast neutrons produced by fission, thus omitting consideration of a neutron moderator. He too believed the critical mass of a sphere of uranium to be "of the order of tons".

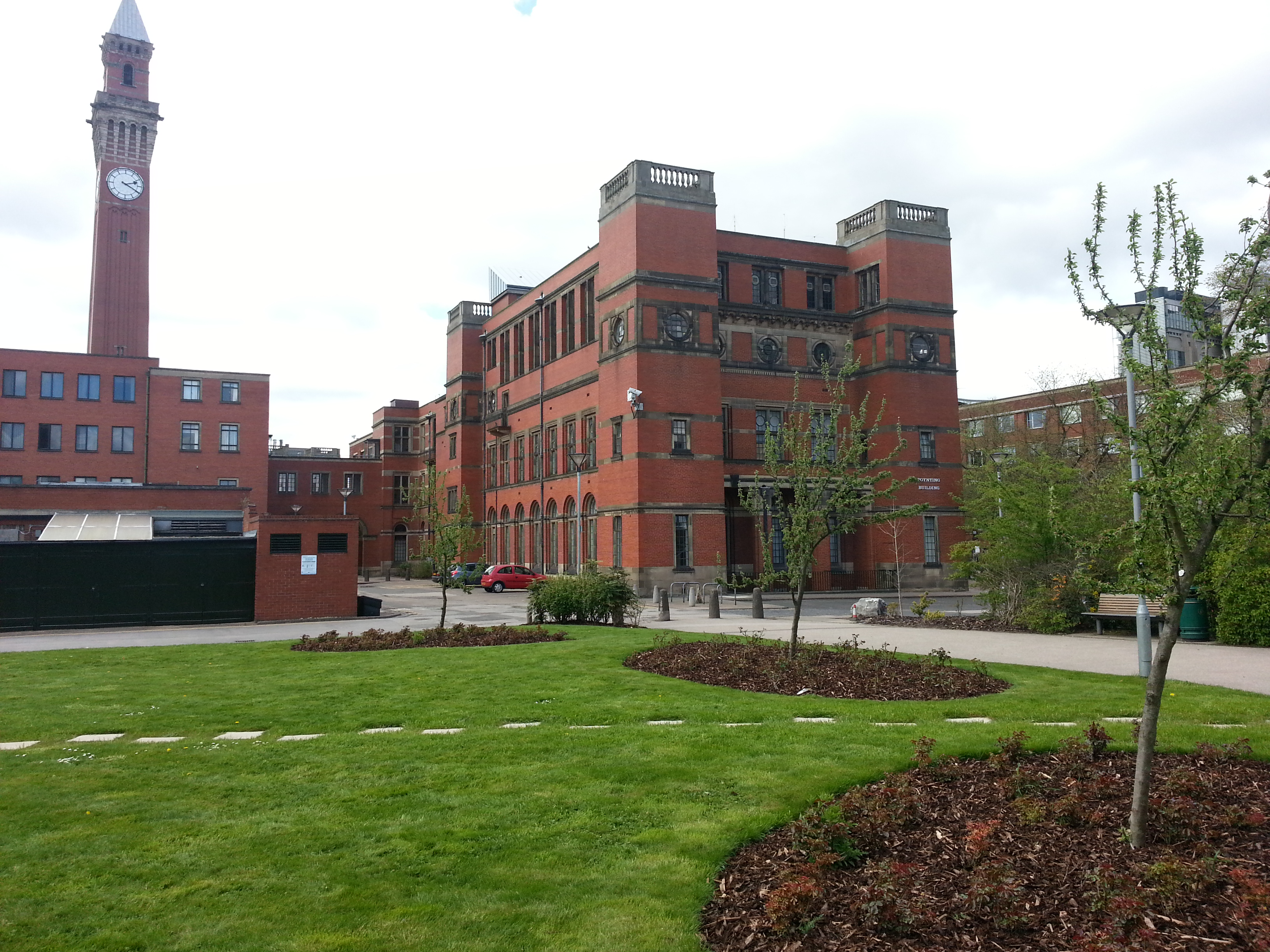
The Poynting Physics building at the University of Birmingham, where Peierls and Frisch wrote the Frisch–Peierls memorandum

However, Bohr had contended that the uranium-235 isotope was far more likely to capture neutrons and fission even from neutrons with the low energies produced by fission. Frisch began experimenting with uranium enrichment through thermal diffusion. Progress was slow; the required equipment was not available, and the radar project had first call on the available resources. He wondered what would happen if he was able to produce a sphere of pure uranium-235. When he used Peierls' formula to calculate its critical mass, he received a startling answer: less than a kilogram would be required. Frisch and Peierls produced the Frisch–Peierls memorandum in March 1940. In it they reported that a five kilogram bomb would be the equivalent to several thousand tons of dynamite, and even a one kilogram bomb would be impressive. Because of the potential radioactive fallout, they thought that the British might find it morally unacceptable.

Oliphant took the Frisch–Peierls memorandum to Tizard in March 1940. He passed it on to Thomson, who discussed it with Cockcroft and Oliphant. They also heard from Jacques Allier of the French Deuxième Bureau, who had been involved in the removal of the entire stock of heavy water from Norway. He told them of the interest the Germans had shown in the heavy water, and in the activity of the French researchers in Paris. Immediate action was taken: the Ministry of Economic Warfare was asked to secure stocks of uranium oxide in danger of being captured by the Germans; British intelligence agencies were asked to investigate the activities of German nuclear scientists; and A. V. Hill, the British Scientific Attaché in Washington, was asked to find out what the Americans were up to. Hill reported that the Americans had scientists investigating the matter, but they did not think that any military applications would be found.

== Organisation ==
A committee was created as a response to the Frisch–Peierls memorandum. It held its first meeting on 10 April 1940, in the ground-floor main committee room of the Royal Society in Burlington House in London. Its meetings were invariably held there. The original members were Thomson, Chadwick, Cockcroft, Oliphant and Philip Moon; Patrick Blackett, Charles Ellis and Norman Haworth were subsequently added, along with a representative of the Director of Scientific Research at the Ministry of Aircraft Production (MAP). The MAUD Committee held its first two meetings in April 1940 before it was formally constituted by CSSAW. CSSAW was abolished in June 1940, and the MAUD Committee then came directly under the MAP. Thomson chaired the committee, and initially acted as its secretary as well, writing up the minutes in longhand on foolscap, until the MAP provided a secretary.

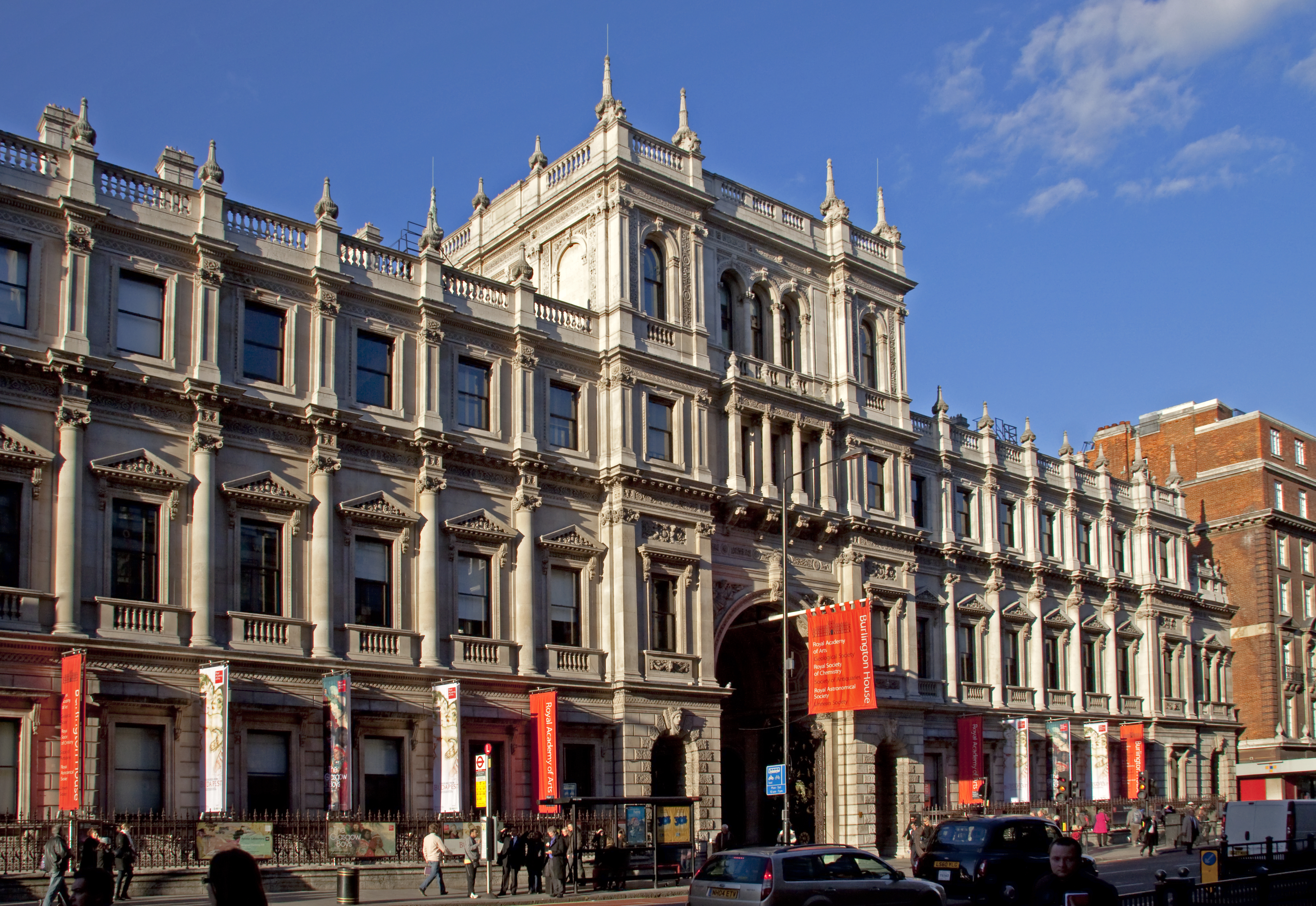
Burlington House in London, where the MAUD Committee met

At first the new committee was named the Thomson Committee after its chairman, but this was soon exchanged for a more unassuming name, the MAUD Committee. MAUD was assumed by many to be an acronym, but it is not. The name MAUD came to be in an unusual way. On 9 April 1940, the day Germany invaded Denmark, Niels Bohr had sent a telegram to Frisch. The telegram ended with a strange line "Tell Cockcroft and Maud Ray Kent". At first it was thought to be code regarding radium or other vital atomic-weapons-related information, hidden in an anagram. One suggestion was to replace the "y" with an "i", producing 'radium taken'. When Bohr returned to England in 1943, it was discovered that the message was addressed to John Cockcroft and Bohr's housekeeper Maud Ray, who was from Kent. Thus the committee was named the MAUD Committee. Although the initials stood for nothing, it was officially the MAUD Committee, not the Maud Committee.

Because of the top secret aspect of the project, only British-born scientists were considered. Even despite their early contributions, Peierls and Frisch were not allowed to participate in the MAUD Committee because, at a time of war, it was considered a security threat to have enemy aliens in charge of a sensitive project. In September 1940, the Technical Sub-Committee was formed, with Peierls and Frisch as members. However, Halban did not take his exclusion from the MAUD Committee in as good grace as Frisch and Peierls. In response, two new committees were created in March 1941 to replace the MAUD Committee and the Technical Sub-Committee, called the MAUD Policy Committee and the MAUD Technical Committee. Unlike the original two committees, they had written terms of reference. The terms of reference of the MAUD Policy Committee were:

1. To supervise on behalf of the Director of Scientific Research, MAP, an investigation into the possibilities of uranium as contributing to the war effort; and
2. To consider the recommendations of the MAUD Technical Committee and to advise the Director of Scientific Research accordingly.

Those of the MAUD Technical Committee were:

1. To consider the problems arising in the uranium investigation;
2. To recommend to the MAUD Policy Committee the experimental work necessary to establish the technical possibilities; and
3. To ensure co-operation between the various groups of investigators.

The MAUD Policy Committee was kept small and included only one representative from each university laboratory. Its members were: Blackett, Chadwick, Cockcroft, Ellis, Haworth, Franz Simon, Thomson and the Director of Scientific Research at the MAP. The MAUD Technical Committee's members were: Moses Blackman, Egon Bretscher, Norman Feather, Frisch, Halban, C. H. Johnson, Kowarski, Wilfrid Mann, Moon, Nevill Mott, Oliphant, Peierls and Thomson. Its meetings were normally attended by Winston Churchill's scientific advisor, Frederick Lindemann, or his representative, and a representative of Imperial Chemical Industries (ICI). Basil Dickins from the MAP acted as the secretary of the Technical Committee. Thomson chaired both committees.

== Activity ==
The MAUD Committee's research was split among four different English universities: the University of Birmingham, the University of Liverpool, the University of Cambridge and the University of Oxford. At first the research was paid for out of the universities' funds. Only in September 1940 did government funding become available. The MAP signed contracts that gave £3,000 to the Cavendish Laboratory at Cambridge (later increased to £6,500), £1,000 (later increased to £2,000) to the Clarendon Laboratory at Oxford, £1,500 to Birmingham, and £2,000 to Liverpool. The universities were reimbursed for expenses by the MAP, which also began to pay some of the salaries of the universities' staff. However, Chadwick, Peierls, Simon and other professors, along with some research staff, were still paid out of university funds. The government also placed a £5,000 order for 5 kilograms (11 lb) of uranium hexafluoride with ICI. Uranium oxide was purchased from the Brandhurt Company, which sourced it from America. Wartime shortages impacted many areas of research, requiring the MAP to write to firms requesting priority for items required by the scientists.

There were also shortages of manpower, as chemists and physicists had been diverted to war work. Of necessity, the universities employed many aliens or ex-aliens. The MAP was initially opposed to their employment on security grounds, especially as most were from enemy or occupied countries. Their employment was only made possible because they were employed by the universities and not the MAP, which was not allowed to employ enemy aliens. The MAP gradually came around to accepting their employment on the project. It protected some from internment, and provided security clearances. There were restrictions on where enemy aliens could work and live, and they were not allowed to own cars, so dispensations were required to allow them to visit other universities. "And so," wrote historian Margaret Gowing, "the greatest of all the wartime secrets was entrusted to scientists excluded for security reasons from other war work."

=== University of Liverpool ===
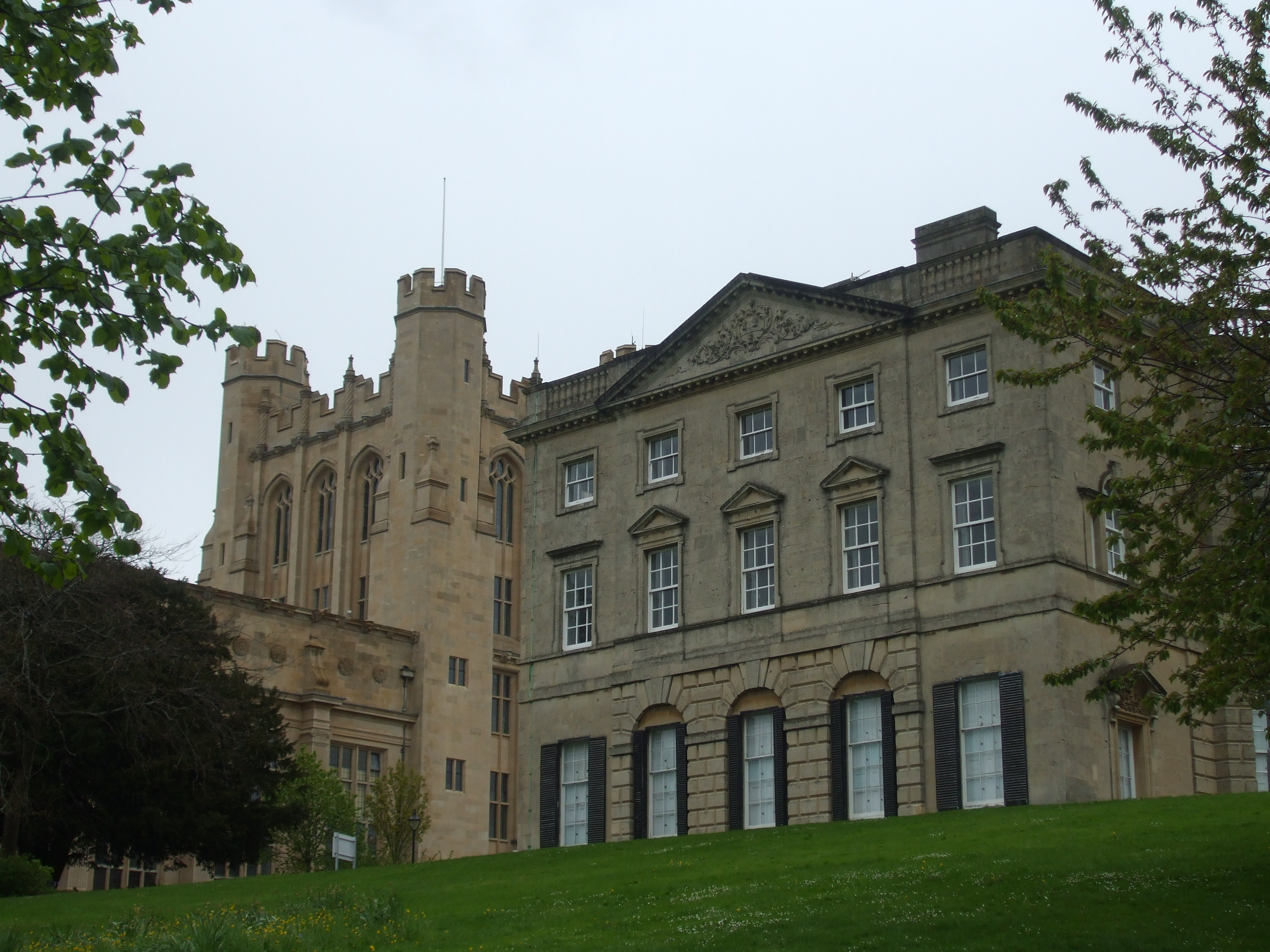
Royal Fort and the Physics Department at the University of Bristol

The division of the MAUD Committee at Liverpool was led by Chadwick, who was assisted by Frisch, Rotblat, Gerry Pickavance, Maurice Pryce and John Riley Holt. The division at Liverpool also controlled a small team at the University of Bristol that included Alan Nunn May and Cecil Frank Powell. At Liverpool they focused on the separation of isotopes through thermal diffusion as was suggested in the Frisch–Peierls memorandum.

This process was based on the fact that when a mixture of two gases passes through a temperature gradient, the heavier gas tends to concentrate at the cold end and the lighter gas at the warm end. That this can be used as a means of isotope separation was first demonstrated by Klaus Clusius and Gerhard Dickel in Germany in 1938, who used it to separate isotopes of neon. They used an apparatus called a "column", consisting of a vertical tube with a hot wire down the centre. The advantage of the technique was that it was simple in design and there were no moving parts. But it could take months to reach equilibrium, required a lot of energy, and needed high temperatures that could cause a problem with the uranium hexafluoride.

Another line of research at Liverpool was measuring the fission cross section of uranium-235, on which Frisch and Peierls' calculations depended. They had assumed that almost every collision between a neutron of any energy and a uranium-235 nucleus would produce a fission. The value they used for the fission cross section was that published by French researchers in 1939, but data published by the Americans in the 15 March and 15 April 1940 issues of the American journal Physical Review indicated that it was much smaller.

No pure uranium-235 was available, so experiments at Liverpool were conducted with natural uranium. The results were inconclusive, but tended to support Frisch and Peierls. By March 1941, Alfred Nier had managed to produce a microscopic amount of pure uranium-235 in the United States, and a team under Merle Tuve at the Carnegie Institution of Washington was measuring the cross section. The uranium-235 was too valuable to send a sample to Britain, so Chadwick sent the Americans a list of measurements he wanted them to carry out. The final result was that the cross section was smaller than Frisch and Peierls had assumed, but the resulting critical mass was still only about eight kilograms.

Meanwhile, Pryce investigated how long a runaway nuclear chain reaction in an atomic bomb would continue before it blew itself apart. He calculated that since the neutrons produced by fission have an energy of about 1 MeV (0.16 pJ) this corresponded to a speed of 1.4×10^{9} cm/s. The major part of the chain reaction would be completed in the order of 10×10^{−8} s (ten "shakes"). From 1 to 10 per cent of the fissile material would fission in this time; but even an atomic bomb with 1 per cent efficiency would release as much energy as 180,000 times its weight in TNT.

=== University of Oxford ===
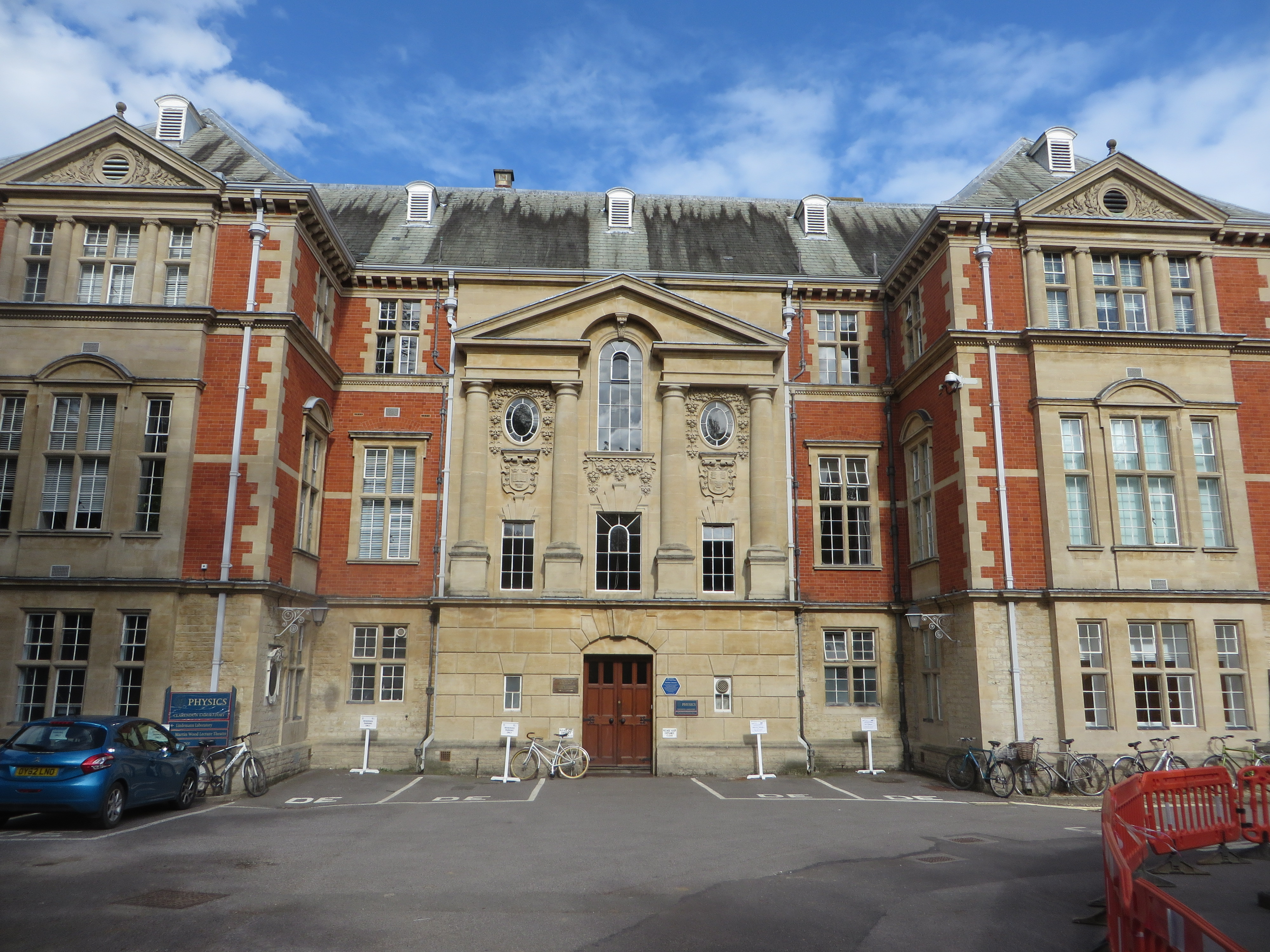
The Clarendon Laboratory at the University of Oxford

The division of the MAUD Committee at Oxford was led by Simon. As a German émigré, he was only able to get involved after Peierls vouched for him, pointing out that Simon had already begun research on isotope separation, which would give the project a head start by his participation. The Oxford team was mostly composed of non-British scientists, including Nicholas Kurti, Kurt Mendelssohn, Heinrich Kuhn, Henry Shull Arms and Heinz London. They concentrated on isotope separation with a method known as gaseous diffusion.

This is based on Graham's law, which states that the rate of effusion of a gas through a porous barrier is inversely proportional to the square root of the gas's molecular mass. In a container with a porous barrier containing a mixture of two gases, the lighter molecules will pass out of the container more rapidly than the heavier molecules. The gas leaving the container is slightly enriched in the lighter molecules, while the residual gas is slightly depleted. Simon's team conducted experiments with copper gauze as the barrier. Because uranium hexafluoride, the only known gas containing uranium, was both scarce and difficult to handle, a mixture of carbon dioxide and water vapour was used to test it.

The result of this work was a report from Simon on the "Estimate of the Size of an Actual Separation Plant" in December 1940. He described an industrial plant capable of producing a kilogram per day of uranium enriched to 99 per cent uranium-235. The plant would use 70,000 square metres (750,000 sq ft) of membrane barriers, in 18,000 separation units in 20 stages. The plant would cover 40 acres (16 ha), the machinery would weigh 70,000 long tons (71,000 t) and consume 60,000 kW of power. He estimated that it would take 12 to 18 months to build at a cost of around £4 million, require 1,200 workers to operate, and cost £1.5 million per annum to run. "We are confident that the separation can be performed in the way described", he concluded, "and we even believe that the scheme is, in view of its object, not unduly expensive of time, money and effort."

=== University of Cambridge ===
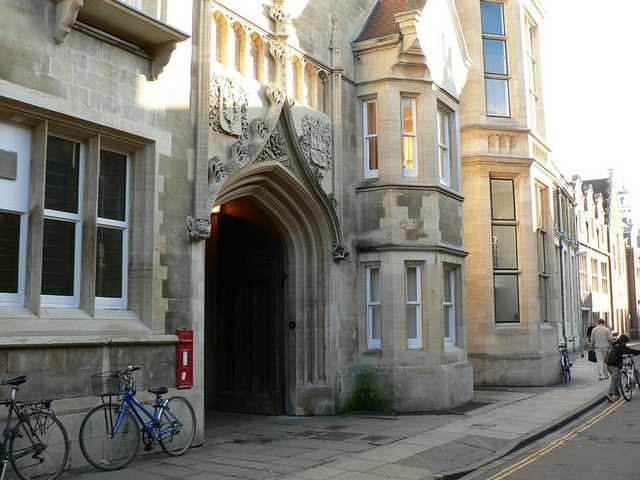
The Cavendish Laboratory at the University of Cambridge

The division of the MAUD Committee at Cambridge was jointly led by Bragg and Cockcroft. It included Bretscher, Feather, Halban, Kowarski, Herbert Freundlich and Nicholas Kemmer. Paul Dirac assisted as a consultant, although he was not formally part of the team. On 19 June 1940, following the German invasion of France, Halban, Kowarski and other French scientists and their families, along with their precious stock of heavy water, were brought to England by the Earl of Suffolk and Major Ardale Golding on the steamer Broompark. The heavy water, valued at £22,000, was initially kept at HM Prison Wormwood Scrubs, but was later secretly stored in the library at Windsor Castle. The French scientists moved to Cambridge, where they conducted experiments that conclusively showed that a nuclear chain reaction could be produced in a mixture of uranium oxide and heavy water.

In a paper written shortly after they arrived in England, Halban and Kowarski theorised that slow neutrons could be absorbed by uranium-238, forming uranium-239. A letter by Edwin McMillan and Philip Abelson published in the Physical Review on 15 June 1940 stated that this decayed to an element with an atomic number of 93, and then to one with an atomic number of 94 and mass of 239, which, while still radioactive, was fairly long-lived. That a letter on such a sensitive subject could still be published irked Chadwick, and he asked for an official protest to be sent to the Americans, which was done.

Bretscher and Feather argued, on theoretical grounds, that this element might be capable of fission by both fast and slow neutrons like uranium-235. If so, this promised another path to an atomic bomb, as it could be bred from the more abundant uranium-238 in a nuclear reactor, and separation from uranium could be by chemical means, as it was a different element, thereby avoiding the necessity for isotope separation. Kemmer suggested that since uranium was named after the planet Uranus, element 93 could be named neptunium and 94 plutonium after the next two planets. Later it was discovered that the Americans had independently adopted the same names, following the same logic. Bretscher and Feather went further, theorising that irradiation of thorium could produce a new isotope of uranium, uranium-233, which might also be susceptible to fission by both fast and slow neutrons. In addition to this work, Eric Rideal studied isotope separation through centrifugation.

=== University of Birmingham ===
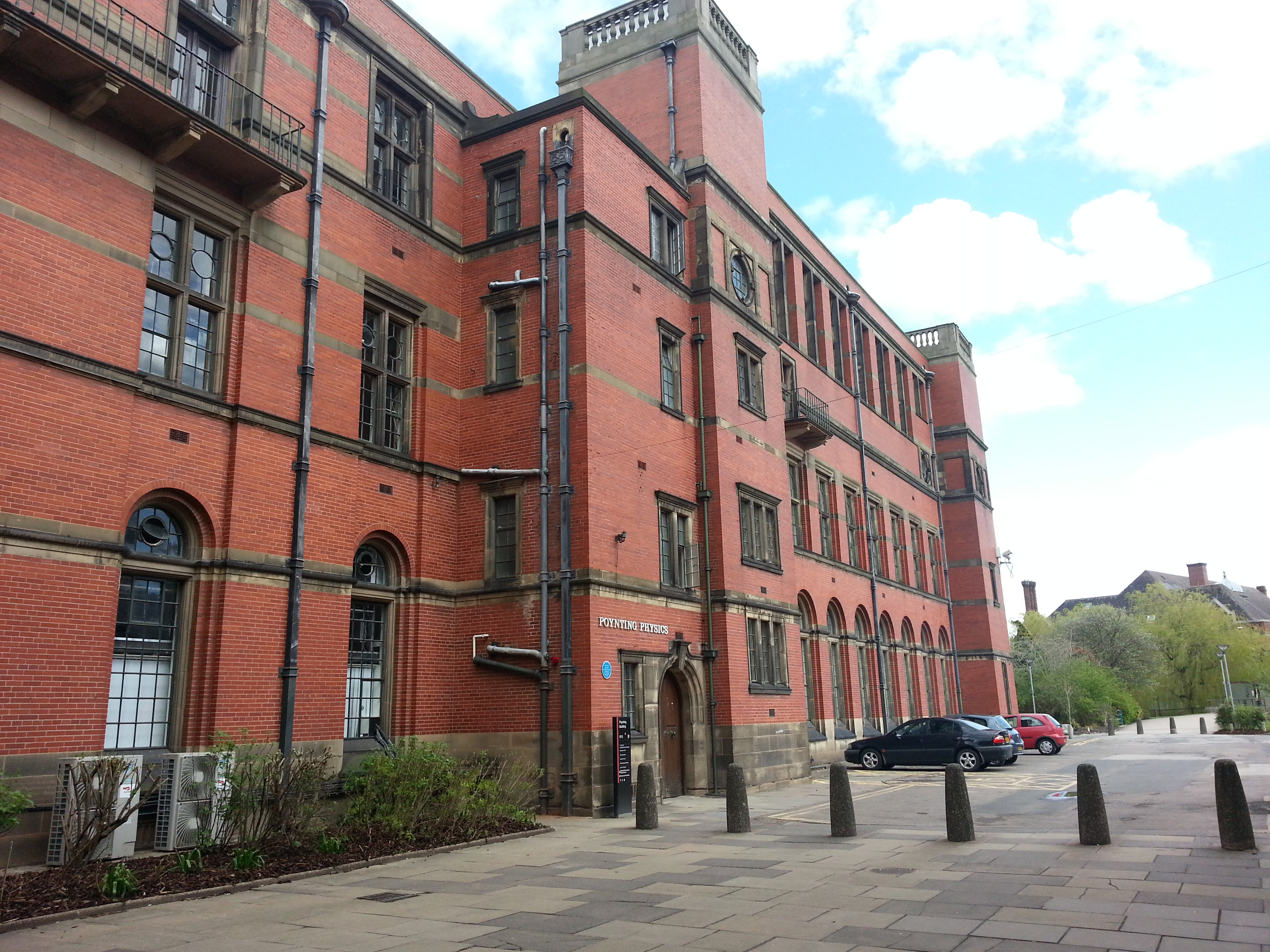
Poynting Physics Building at the University of Birmingham. The blue plaque commemorates the work of Peierls and Frisch.

The division of the MAUD Committee at Birmingham was led by Peierls. He was assisted by Haworth, Johnson and, from 28 May 1941, Klaus Fuchs. Haworth led the chemists in studying the properties of uranium hexafluoride. One thing in its favour was that fluorine has only one isotope, so any difference in weight between two molecules is solely due to the different isotope of uranium.

Otherwise, uranium hexafluoride was far from ideal. It solidified at 120 °F (49 °C), was corrosive, and reacted with many substances, including water. It was therefore difficult and dangerous to handle. However, a search by the chemists at Birmingham failed to uncover another gaseous compound of uranium. Lindemann used his influence with Lord Melchett, a director of ICI, to get ICI to produce uranium hexafluoride on an industrial scale. ICI's hydrofluoric acid plant was out of commission, and required extensive repairs, so the quote for a kilogram of uranium hexafluoride came to £5,000. Nonetheless, the order was placed in December 1940. ICI also explored methods of producing pure uranium metal.

Peierls and his team worked on the theoretical problems of a nuclear bomb. In essence, they were in charge of finding out the technical features of the bomb. Along with Fuchs, Peierls also interpreted all the experimental data from the other laboratories. He examined the different processes by which they were obtaining isotopes. By the end of the summer in 1940, Peierls preferred gaseous diffusion to thermal diffusion.

A paper was received from the United States in which George Kistiakowsky argued that a nuclear weapon would do very little damage, as most of the energy would be expended heating the surrounding air. A chemical explosive generates very hot gases in a confined space, but a nuclear explosion will not do this. Peierls, Fuchs, Geoffrey Taylor and J. G. Kynch worked out the hydrodynamics to refute Kistiakowsky's argument. Taylor produced a paper on "The Formation of a Blast Wave by a Very Intense Explosion" in June 1941.

== Reports ==
The first draft of the final report of the MAUD Committee was written by Thomson in June 1941, and circulated among members of the committee on 26 June, with instructions that the next meeting on 2 July would discuss it. A considerable amount of editing was done, mainly by Chadwick. At this stage it was divided into two reports. The first was on "Use of Uranium for a Bomb"; the second one "Use of Uranium as a Source of Power". They consolidated all the research and experiments the MAUD Committee had completed. The report opened with a statement that:

We should like to emphasize at the beginning of this report that we entered the project with more skepticism than belief, though we felt it was a matter which had to be investigated. As we proceeded we became more and more convinced that release of atomic energy on a large scale is possible and that conditions can be chosen which would make it a very powerful weapon of war. We have now reached the conclusion that it will be possible to make an effective uranium bomb which, containing some 25 lb of active material, would be equivalent as regards destructive effect to 1,800 tons of TNT and would also release large quantities of radioactive substances which would make places near to where the bomb exploded dangerous to human life for a long period.

The first report concluded that a bomb was feasible. It described it in technical detail, and provided specific proposals for developing it, including cost estimates. A plant to produce one kilogram of uranium-235 per day was estimated to cost £5 million and would require a large skilled labour force that was also needed for other parts of the war effort. It could be available in as little as two years. The amount of damage that it would do was estimated to be similar to that of the Halifax explosion in 1917, which had devastated everything in a 1/4-mile (0.40 km) radius. The report warned that Germany had shown interest in heavy water, and although this was not considered useful for a bomb, the possibility remained that Germany could also be working on the bomb.

The second report was shorter. It recommended that Halban and Kowarski should move to the US where there were plans to make heavy water on a large scale. Plutonium might be more suitable than uranium-235, and plutonium research should continue in Britain. It concluded that the controlled fission of uranium could be used to generate heat energy for use in machines, and provide large quantities of radioisotopes which could be used as substitutes for radium. Heavy water or possibly graphite might serve as a moderator for the fast neutrons. In conclusion though, while the nuclear reactor had considerable promise for future peaceful uses, the committee felt that it was not worth considering during the present war.

== Outcome ==
=== United Kingdom ===
In response to the MAUD Committee report, a nuclear weapons programme was launched. To co-ordinate the effort, a new directorate was created, with the deliberately misleading name of Tube Alloys for security purposes. Sir John Anderson, the Lord President of the Council, became the minister responsible, and Wallace Akers from ICI was appointed the director of Tube Alloys. Tube Alloys and the Manhattan Project exchanged information, but did not initially combine their efforts, ostensibly over concerns about American security. Ironically, it was the British project that had already been penetrated by atomic spies for the Soviet Union. The most significant of them at this time was John Cairncross, a member of the notorious Cambridge Five, who worked as the private secretary to Lord Hankey, a minister without portfolio in the War Cabinet. Cairncross provided the NKVD with information from the MAUD Committee.

The United Kingdom did not have the manpower or resources of the United States, and despite its early and promising start, Tube Alloys fell behind its American counterpart and was dwarfed by it. The British considered producing an atomic bomb without American help, but the project would have needed overwhelming priority, the projected cost was staggering, disruption to other wartime projects was inevitable, and it was unlikely to be ready in time to affect the outcome of the war in Europe.

At the Quebec Conference in August 1943, Churchill and Roosevelt signed the Quebec Agreement, which merged the two national projects. The Quebec Agreement established the Combined Policy Committee and the Combined Development Trust to co-ordinate their efforts. The 19 September 1944 Hyde Park Agreement extended both commercial and military co-operation into the post-war period.

A British mission led by Akers assisted in the development of gaseous diffusion technology at the SAM Laboratories in New York. Another, headed by Oliphant, assisted with that of the electromagnetic separation process at the Berkeley Radiation Laboratory. Cockcroft became the director of the joint British-Canadian Montreal Laboratory. A British mission to the Los Alamos Laboratory was led by Chadwick, and later Peierls, which included several of Britain's most eminent scientists. As overall head of the British Mission, Chadwick forged a close and successful partnership, and ensured that British participation was complete and wholehearted.

=== United States ===
In response to the 1939 Einstein-Szilard letter, President Franklin D. Roosevelt had created an Advisory Committee on Uranium in October 1939, chaired by Lyman Briggs. Research concentrated on slow fission for power production, but with a growing interest in isotope separation. In June 1941, Roosevelt created the Office of Scientific Research and Development (OSRD), with Vannevar Bush as its director, personally responsible to the President. The Uranium Committee became the Uranium Section of the OSRD, which was soon renamed the S-1 Section for security reasons.

Bush engaged Arthur Compton, a Nobel Prize winner, and the National Academy of Sciences. His report was issued on 17 May 1941. It endorsed a stronger effort, but did not address the design or manufacture of a bomb in any detail. Information from the MAUD Committee came from British scientists travelling to the United States, notably the Tizard Mission, and from American observers at the MAUD Committee meetings in April and July 1941. Cockcroft, who was part of the Tizard Mission, reported that the American project lagged behind the British one, and was not proceeding as fast.

Britain was at war and felt an atomic bomb was urgent, but the US was not yet at war. It was Oliphant who pushed the American programme into action. He flew to the United States in late August 1941, ostensibly to discuss the radar programme, but actually to find out why the United States was ignoring the MAUD Committee's findings. Oliphant reported: "The minutes and reports had been sent to Lyman Briggs, who was the Director of the Uranium Committee, and we were puzzled to receive virtually no comment. I called on Briggs in Washington, only to find out that this inarticulate and unimpressive man had put the reports in his safe and had not shown them to members of his committee. I was amazed and distressed."

Oliphant met with the S-1 Section. Samuel K. Allison was a new committee member, an experimental physicist and a protégé of Compton at the University of Chicago. Oliphant "came to a meeting", Allison recalled, "and said 'bomb' in no uncertain terms. He told us we must concentrate every effort on the bomb and said we had no right to work on power plants or anything but the bomb. The bomb would cost 25 million dollars, he said, and Britain did not have the money or the manpower, so it was up to us."

Oliphant then visited his friend Ernest Lawrence, an American Nobel Prize winner, to explain the urgency. Lawrence contacted Compton and James B. Conant, who received a copy of the final MAUD Report from Thomson on 3 October 1941. Harold Urey, also a Nobel Prize winner, and George B. Pegram were sent to the UK to obtain more information. In January 1942, the OSRD was empowered to engage in large engineering projects in addition to research. Without the help of the MAUD Committee the Manhattan Project would have started months behind. Instead they were able to begin thinking about how to create a bomb, not whether it was possible. Gowing noted that "events that change a time scale by only a few months can nevertheless change history." On 16 July 1945, the Manhattan Project detonated the first atomic bomb in the Trinity nuclear test.

=== Soviet Union ===
The Soviet Union received details of British research from its atomic spies Klaus Fuchs, Engelbert Broda and Cairncross. Lavrentiy Beria, the head of the NKVD, gave a report to the General Secretary of the Communist Party of the Soviet Union, Joseph Stalin, in March 1942 that included the MAUD reports and other British documents passed by Cairncross. In 1943 the NKVD obtained a copy of the final report by the MAUD Committee. This led Stalin to order the start of a Soviet programme, although it had very limited resources. Igor Kurchatov was appointed director of the nascent programme later that year. Six years later, on 29 August 1949, the Soviet Union tested an atomic bomb.
