= Christopher Hollis Johnson =

British chemist and physicist

Christopher Hollis Johnson CBE (18 March 1904 – 9 April 1978) was a British chemist and physicist. He worked in weapons research and was part of the technical committee of Tube Alloys, the UK's secret atomic weapon development programme.

== Biography ==
He was born in Reading to Agnes Mary Hollis and Ernest Gladstone Johnson. His father was a hosier, outfitter and haberdasher. In 1930, he married Irene Kathleen Gilbert.

Before World War II, he researched valence theory, polarimetry and related optically active compounds. By 1939, he was a senior lecturer in inorganic chemistry at the University of Birmingham. At the time, concerns had grown about the possibility of the creation of an atomic weapon by an aggressive Nazi Germany. Johnson's Birmingham colleague Mark Oliphant directed Rudolf Peierls and Otto Frisch (refugee physicists also at Birmingham) to investigate if indeed such a weapon was feasible and in March 1940 Frisch, using Peierl's formula, got an alarming result which confirmed that a small mass of uranium-235 could have a devastating effect; the Frisch-Peierls memorandum was circulated secretly by Oliphant and immediate action taken to try and secure supplies of uranium ore. What came to be called the MAUD Technical Committee was created in response to the Frisch-Peierls memorandum. As well as a Policy Committee, a Technical Committee contained scientists and engineers mainly from four British universities, Liverpool, Oxford, Cambridge and Birmingham. At Birmingham, the committee was led by Peierls assisted by Johnson, Nobel Prize winner Norman Haworth and, in 1941, Klaus Fuchs, who was later exposed as a Soviet spy. Haworth led the chemists studying the properties of uranium hexafluoride; Johnson's experiments resulted in a paper describing how it attacked various materials. The research, as part of Tube Alloys, was subsumed into the Manhattan Project.

In 1958, Johnson was awarded a CBE for his research. From 1958 to 1964, he was the Director of the Explosives Research and Development Establishment at Waltham Abbey, part of the Ministry of Aviation, when he retired. He died in 1978, aged 74.
