= Tizard Mission =

British delegation to the U.S. in 1940 during WWII

The Tizard Mission, officially the British Technical and Scientific Mission, was a delegation from the United Kingdom that visited the United States during World War II to share secret research and development (R&D) work that had military applications. It received its popular name from the programme's instigator, Henry Tizard, a British scientist and chairman of the Aeronautical Research Committee, which had orchestrated the development of radar.

The mission travelled to the U.S. in September 1940 during the Battle of Britain. They conveyed a number of British technical and scientific secrets with the objective of securing U.S. assistance in sustaining the war effort and obtaining the industrial resources to exploit the military potential of these technologies, which Britain itself could not fully use, due to the immediate demands of other war-related production.

Referring to one such British secret, a device known as a resonant cavity magnetron, American historian James Phinney Baxter III later wrote, "When the members of the Tizard Mission brought one to America in 1940, they carried the most valuable cargo ever brought to our shores." The mission also opened up channels of communication for jet engine and atomic bomb development, leading to the British contribution to the Manhattan Project, and catalyzed Allied technological cooperation during World War II.

The Tizard mission is seen as one of the key events that forged the wartime Anglo-American alliance. After the war, it became the foundation for future cooperation in scientific research at institutions within and across the United States, United Kingdom and Canada.

== Preparation and objectives ==
Britain made significant scientific advances in military technology, weapons and their components before World War II began in September 1939. After the Fall of France in June 1940, which saw Germany overrun most of the countries of Western Europe, Germany's planned invasion of the United Kingdom, Operation Sea Lion, was preceded by its effort to establish air superiority in the Battle of Britain.

Henry Tizard was a British scientist and chairman of the Aeronautical Research Committee, which had orchestrated the development of radar before the war. He sought to initiate cooperation with the United States to further the research, development and production of radar and other technologies. The U.S. was neutral and, in many quarters, unwilling to become involved in the war, but had greater resources for development and production, which Britain sought to use. The information provided by the British delegation was subject to carefully vetted security procedures, and contained some of the greatest scientific advances made at that time. The technology Britain possessed included the greatly-improved cavity magnetron, the design for the proximity VT fuse, details of Frank Whittle's jet engine and the Frisch–Peierls memorandum and MAUD Report describing the feasibility of an atomic bomb. Though these may be considered the most significant, many other technologies had also been developed, including designs for rockets, superchargers, gyroscopic gunsights, submarine detection devices, self-sealing fuel tanks and plastic explosives.

Congress had many proponents of neutrality for the USA and so there were further barriers to co-operation. Tizard decided the most productive approach would be simply to give away the information and use America's productive capacity. Neither Winston Churchill nor the radar pioneer, Robert Watson-Watt, were initially in agreement with these tactics for the mission. Nevertheless, Tizard first arranged for Archibald Hill, another scientific member of the committee, to go to Washington to explore the possibilities. Hill's report to Tizard was optimistic.

== Moving the secrets ==
After Churchill's approval of the project, the team began gathering all technical secrets which had potential military uses. At the end of August, Tizard went to the U.S. by air to make preliminary arrangements. The rest of the mission would follow by ship. They were:

- Brigadier F.C. Wallace MC (British Army)
- Captain H.W. Faulkner (Royal Navy)
- Group Captain F.L. Pearce (Royal Air Force)
- Professor John Cockcroft (Army Research) – nuclear physicist and Assistant Director of Scientific Research at the Ministry of Supply (Note: John Cockcroft would receive a Nobel prize in 1951.)
- Edward George Bowen (radar)
- Arthur Edgar Woodward-Nutt, an Air Ministry official (secretary)

All the documents were gathered in a small trunk: a lockable metal deed box, used for holding important valuable documents such as property deeds. Bowen was allowed to take 'Magnetron Number 12' with him. After spending the night under Bowen's hotel bed, the case was strapped to the roof of a taxi to the station. An over-eager railway porter whisked it from Bowen at Euston Station to take it to the train to Liverpool and Bowen almost lost sight of it. Inconsistently, in Liverpool, the magnetron was given a full Army escort.

The team arrived in Halifax, Canada, on 6 September on board the CPR Liner Duchess of Richmond (later known as the RMS Empress of Canada), and went on to Washington, D.C., a few days later. The team of six assembled in Washington on 12 September 1940.

== Meetings ==
Tizard met Vannevar Bush, the chairman of the National Defense Research Committee, on 31 August 1940, and arranged a series of meetings with each division of the NDRC. When the American and British teams met, there was initially some cautious probing by each side to avoid giving away too much without getting anything back in exchange. At a meeting hosted by NDRC's two-month-old "Microwave Committee" chairman Dr Alfred Loomis at the Wardman Park Hotel on 19 September 1940 the British disclosed the technical details of the Chain Home early warning radar stations. The British thought the Americans did not have anything like this, but found it was virtually identical to the US Navy's longwave CXAM radar.

The Americans then described their survey of microwave research done by Loomis and Karl Compton earlier in 1940. The British realised that Bell Telephone Laboratories and General Electric both could contribute a lot to receiver technology. The Americans had shown a Navy experimental shortwave 10-centimetre wavelength radar but had to admit that it had not enough transmitter power and they were at a dead end. Bowen and Cockcroft then revealed the cavity magnetron, with an amazing power output of about ten kilowatts at 10 centimetres. This disclosure dispelled any tension left between the delegations, and the meeting then went smoothly.

Britain was interested in the Norden bombsight. President Roosevelt apologised and said that it was not available to Britain unless it could be shown that the Germans had something similar. Tizard was not unduly dismayed as he thought there were other US technologies more useful to Britain than the bombsight, and he asked for the unit's external dimensions so that British bombers could be modified to take it, if it became available at some future date.

GEC at Wembley made 12 prototype cavity magnetrons in August 1940, and No 12 was sent to America with Bowen, where it was shown on 19 September 1940 in Alfred Loomis’ apartment. The American NDRC Microwave Committee was stunned at the power level produced. However, the Bell Labs director was upset when it was X-rayed and had eight holes rather than the six holes shown on the GEC plans. After contacting (via the transatlantic cable) Dr Eric Megaw, GEC’s vacuum tube expert Megaw recalled that when he had asked for 12 prototypes he said make 10 with 6 holes, one with 7 and one with 8; there was no time to amend the drawings. And No 12 with 8 holes was chosen for the Tizard Mission. So Bell Labs chose to copy the sample; and while early British magnetrons had six cavities the American ones had eight cavities.

Bowen stayed in America, and a few days later, at the General Electric labs in New Jersey, he showed the Americans that the magnetron worked. The Bell Telephone Company was given the job of making magnetrons, producing the first 30 in October 1940, and over a million by the end of the war.

The Tizard delegation also visited Enrico Fermi at Columbia University and told Fermi of the Frisch–Peierls concept for an atomic bomb. Fermi was highly sceptical, mainly because his research was geared towards using nuclear power to produce steam, not atomic bombs. In Ottawa, the delegation also met a Canadian, George Laurence, who had secretly built his own slow neutron experiment. Laurence had anticipated Fermi's work by several months.

Tizard met with both Vannevar Bush and George W. Lewis and told them about jet propulsion, but he revealed very little except the seriousness of British efforts. Bush later recalled: "The interesting parts of the subject, namely the explicit way in which the investigation was being carried out, were apparently not known to Tizard, and at least he did not give me any indication that he knew such details". Later, Bush realised that the development of the Whittle engine was far ahead of the NACA project. In July 1941 he wrote to General "Hap" Arnold, commander of the USAAF, "It becomes evident that the Whittle engine is a satisfactory development and that it is approaching production, although we yet do not know just how satisfactory it is. Certainly, if it is now in such state that the British plans call for large production in five months, it is extraordinarily advanced and no time should be lost on the matter".

== Outcome and subsequent events ==
The Tizard mission was hailed as a success, especially for its impact on the subsequent development and deployment of radar as well as wider Allied technological cooperation during World War II. Although the German bombing of the UK was largely over by the time that the new radar systems were in production, technology such as aircraft radar and LORAN navigation greatly helped the Allied war effort in Europe and the Pacific. The development of the cavity magnetron, a key radar component, would enable the production of radar units small enough to be installed in night fighters, allow antisubmarine aircraft to locate surfaced U-boats and provide great navigational assistance to bombers. It is considered to be a significant factor in the eventual Allied victory in the Second World War. According to James Phinney Baxter III, Official Historian of the Office of Scientific Research and Development: "[T]he greatest of [British] contributions to radar was the development of the resonant cavity magnetron… This revolutionary discovery… was the first tube capable of producing power enough to make radar feasible at wave lengths of less than 50 centimeters. When the members of the Tizard Mission brought one to America in 1940, they carried the most valuable cargo ever brought to our [i.e., U.S.] shores. It sparked the whole development of microwave radar".

The Tizard mission caused the foundation of the MIT Radiation Lab in October 1940, which became one of the largest wartime projects, employing nearly 4,000 people at its peak. The mission also opened up channels of communication for the design and development of jet engines. Vannevar Bush recommended that arrangements should be made to produce the British engine in the United States by finding a suitable company. This company turned out to be General Electric and the US Whittle engine would emerge as the General Electric I-A and subsequent production General Electric J31.

When they returned to the UK in November 1940, the delegation reported that the slow neutron research conducted by French exiles in Cambridge, Columbia (by Fermi) and Canada (by Laurence) was probably irrelevant to the war effort. Nonetheless, since nuclear boilers could have some post-war value, they arranged for some financial support for the Canadian fission experiments. George Laurence later became involved in the secret exchanges of nuclear information between the British and the Americans. The British recognized the atomic bomb was a serious possibility when Franz Simon reported in December 1940 to the British MAUD Committee that it was feasible to separate the isotope uranium-235. Following this, the British created a nuclear weapons project, code named Tube Alloys, and encouraged the United States to begin this type of research, which became the Manhattan Project.

== Legacy ==
The Tizard Mission is seen as one of the key events in forging the wartime Anglo-American alliance. It was the foundation for cooperation in scientific research at institutions within and across the United States, the United Kingdom and Canada. Its legacy was marked on its 75th anniversary in 2015 by various groups including: the Massachusetts Institute of Technology, Imperial College London, Office of Naval Research, British Embassy in Washington, Canadian Embassy in Washington, National Air and Space Museum, and the Defense Visual Information Distribution Service.
