= Committee for the Scientific Survey of Air Defence =

The Committee for the Scientific Survey of Air Defence (CSSAD), also known as the Tizard Committee after its chairman, Henry Tizard, was a pre-World War II scientific mission to study the needs of anti-aircraft warfare in the United Kingdom. The Committee is best known for its role in shepherding the development of radar, and the building of the Chain Home radar array and its associated control centres. Winston Churchill credited the success of the Battle of Britain to this work.

CSSAD was formed in 1934. In September 1939, it was merged with the Committee for the Scientific Survey of Air Offence, which had been formed in 1937, and was also chaired by Tizard, to form the Committee for the Scientific Survey of Air Warfare (CSSAW). Tizard helped convince Churchill to hand over Britain's most important secret weapons technology – the magnetron – to the Americans with no strings attached. The Tizard Mission (officially the British Technical and Scientific Mission) delivered the technology to the Americans in a simple black metal box at the height of the Battle of Britain. CSSAW was discontinued in June 1940.
