= Frisch–Peierls memorandum =

First technical exposition of a practical nuclear weapon

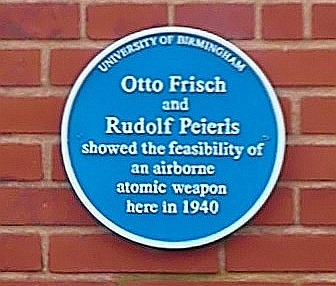
Blue plaque to physicists Frisch and Peierls on the wall of the Nuffield Building, University of Birmingham

The Frisch–Peierls memorandum was the first technical exposition of a practical nuclear weapon. It was written by expatriate German-Jewish physicist Rudolf Peierls and Austrian-Jewish physicist Otto Frisch in March 1940 while they were both working for Mark Oliphant at the University of Birmingham in Britain during World War II.

The memorandum contained some of the first calculations about the size of the critical mass of fissile material needed for an atomic bomb. It revealed that the amount required might be small enough to incorporate into a bomb that could be delivered by air. It also anticipated the strategic and moral implications of nuclear weapons.

It helped send both Britain and America down a path which led to the MAUD Committee, the Tube Alloys project, the Manhattan Project, and ultimately the atomic bombings of Hiroshima and Nagasaki.

== Background ==
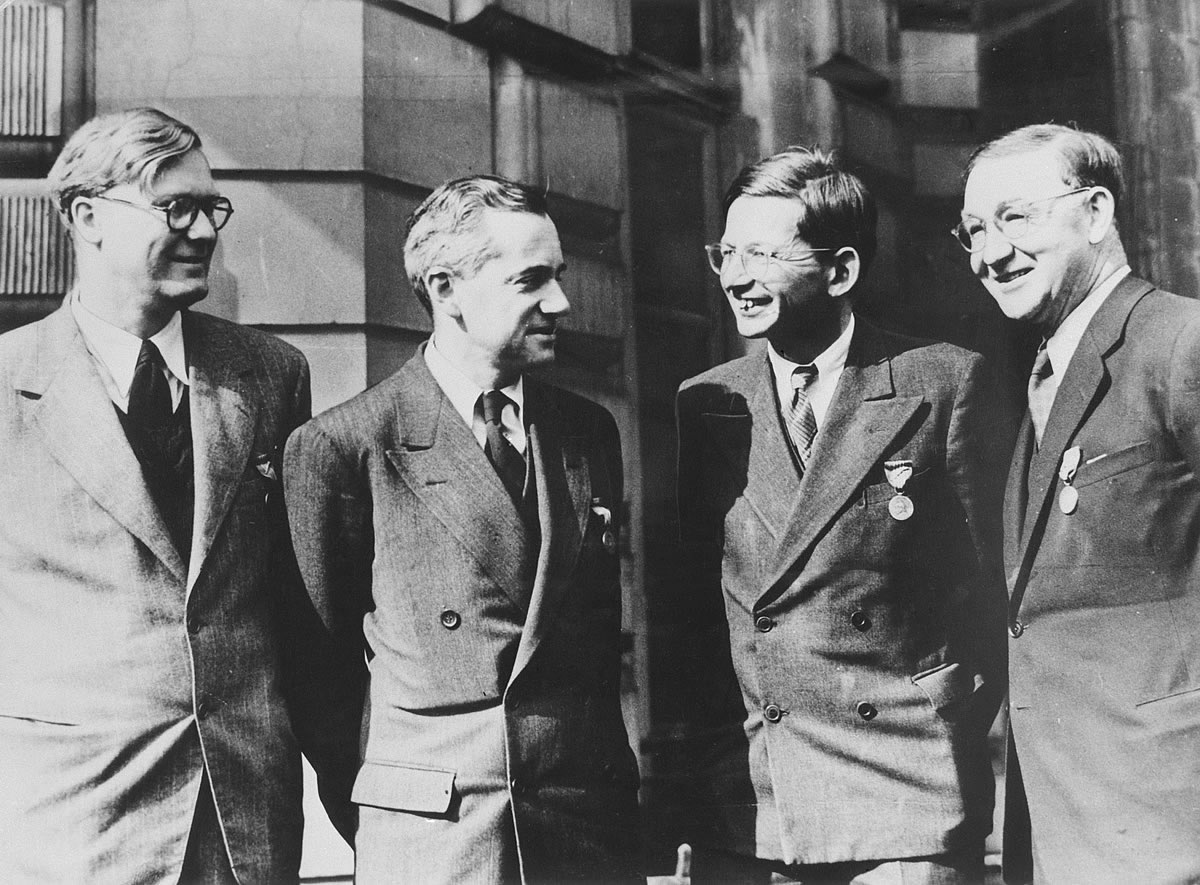
William Penney, Otto Frisch, Rudolf Peierls and John Cockcroft wearing the Medals of Freedom awarded in 1946 for their services to the Manhattan Project

=== Rudolf Peierls ===
Rudolf Peierls was born in Berlin in 1907. He studied physics at the University of Berlin, at LMU Munich under Arnold Sommerfeld, the University of Leipzig under Werner Heisenberg, and ETH Zurich under Wolfgang Pauli. After receiving his DPhil from Leipzig in 1929, he became an assistant to Pauli in Zurich. In 1932, he was awarded a Rockefeller Fellowship, which he used to study in Rome under Enrico Fermi, and then at the Cavendish Laboratory at the University of Cambridge under Ralph H. Fowler. Due to Adolf Hitler's rise to power in Germany, being Jewish, he elected not to return home in 1933, but to remain in Britain. He worked with Hans Bethe at the University of Manchester, then at the Mond Laboratory at Cambridge. In 1937, Mark Oliphant, an Australian and newly appointed professor of physics at the University of Birmingham, recruited him for a new chair there in applied mathematics.

=== Otto Frisch ===
Otto Robert Frisch was born in Vienna in 1904. He studied physics at the University of Vienna, from which he received his DPhil in 1926. He worked at the Physikalisch-Technische Reichsanstalt in Berlin until 1930, when he obtained a position at the University of Hamburg under the Nobel Prize-winning scientist Otto Stern. As non-Aryans, Stern and Frisch were dismissed after Hitler's accession. Stern found Frisch a position in Britain with Patrick Blackett at Birkbeck College at the University of London, and a grant from the Academic Assistance Council. He followed this with a five-year stint at the Niels Bohr Institute in Copenhagen with Niels Bohr where he increasingly specialised in nuclear physics, particularly the physics of neutrons, which had been discovered by James Chadwick in 1932. Oliphant invited Frisch to come to the University of Birmingham in the summer of 1939. When the outbreak of the Second World War in September 1939 prevented his return to Copenhagen, Oliphant found him a position at the University of Birmingham.

=== Nuclear fission ===
During the Christmas holiday in 1938, Frisch visited his aunt Lise Meitner in Kungälv in Sweden, where she had relocated after Germany's annexation of Austria. While there she received the news that her former colleagues Otto Hahn and Fritz Strassmann in Berlin had discovered that the collision of a neutron with a uranium nucleus produced barium as one of its byproducts. Frisch and Meitner hypothesized that the uranium nucleus had split in two. They estimated the energy released at around 200 MeV, and Frisch appropriated the term fission from biology to describe it. Hahn's paper described the experiment and the finding of the barium byproduct. Meitner and Frisch's paper, dated 16 January 1939, explained the physics behind the phenomenon. Frisch went back to Copenhagen, where he was able to isolate the fragments produced by fission reactions. Frisch later recalled that:

In all this excitement we had missed the most important point: the chain reaction. It was Christian Møller, a Danish colleague, who first suggested to me that the fission fragments (the two freshly formed nuclei) might contain enough surplus energy each to eject a neutron or two; each of these might cause another fission and generate more neutrons... So from Møller's remark the exciting vision arose that by assembling enough pure uranium (with appropriate care!) one might start a controlled chain reaction and liberate nuclear energy on a scale that really mattered.

The news of the discovery of fission was brought to America by Bohr in January 1939. Bohr and John A. Wheeler set to work applying the liquid drop model developed by Bohr and Fritz Kalckar to explain the mechanism of nuclear fission. George Placzek, who was skeptical about the whole idea of fission, challenged Bohr to explain why uranium seemed to fission with both very fast and very slow neutrons. Bohr had an epiphany that the fission at low energies was due to the uranium-235 isotope, while at high energies it was due mainly to the more abundant uranium-238 isotope. The former makes up just 0.7% of natural uranium; while the latter accounts for 99.3%. On 16 April, Bohr, Placzek, Wheeler, Eugene Wigner and Leon Rosenfeld discussed whether it would be possible to use a nuclear chain reaction to make an atomic bomb, and concluded that it was not. Bohr observed that "It would take the entire efforts of a country to make a bomb."

=== British response ===
In Britain, scientists also considered whether an atomic bomb was practical. At the University of Liverpool, Chadwick and the Polish refugee scientist Joseph Rotblat tackled the problem, but their calculations were inconclusive. At Cambridge, Nobel Prize in Physics laureates George Paget Thomson and William Lawrence Bragg wanted the government to take urgent action to acquire uranium ore to keep it out of German hands. The Secretary of the Committee of Imperial Defence, Major General Hastings Ismay asked Sir Henry Tizard for an opinion. Tizard was sceptical of the likelihood of an atomic bomb being developed, reckoning the odds of success at 100,000 to 1.

Even at such long odds, the danger was sufficiently great to be taken seriously. It was not considered worthwhile to immediately acquire the uranium, but Tizard's Committee on the Scientific Survey of Air Defence was directed to conduct research into the feasibility of atomic bombs. Thomson, at Imperial College London, and Oliphant, at the University of Birmingham, were tasked with carrying out a series of experiments on uranium. By February 1940, Thomson's team had failed to create a chain reaction in natural uranium, and he had decided that it was not worth pursuing.

== Memorandum ==
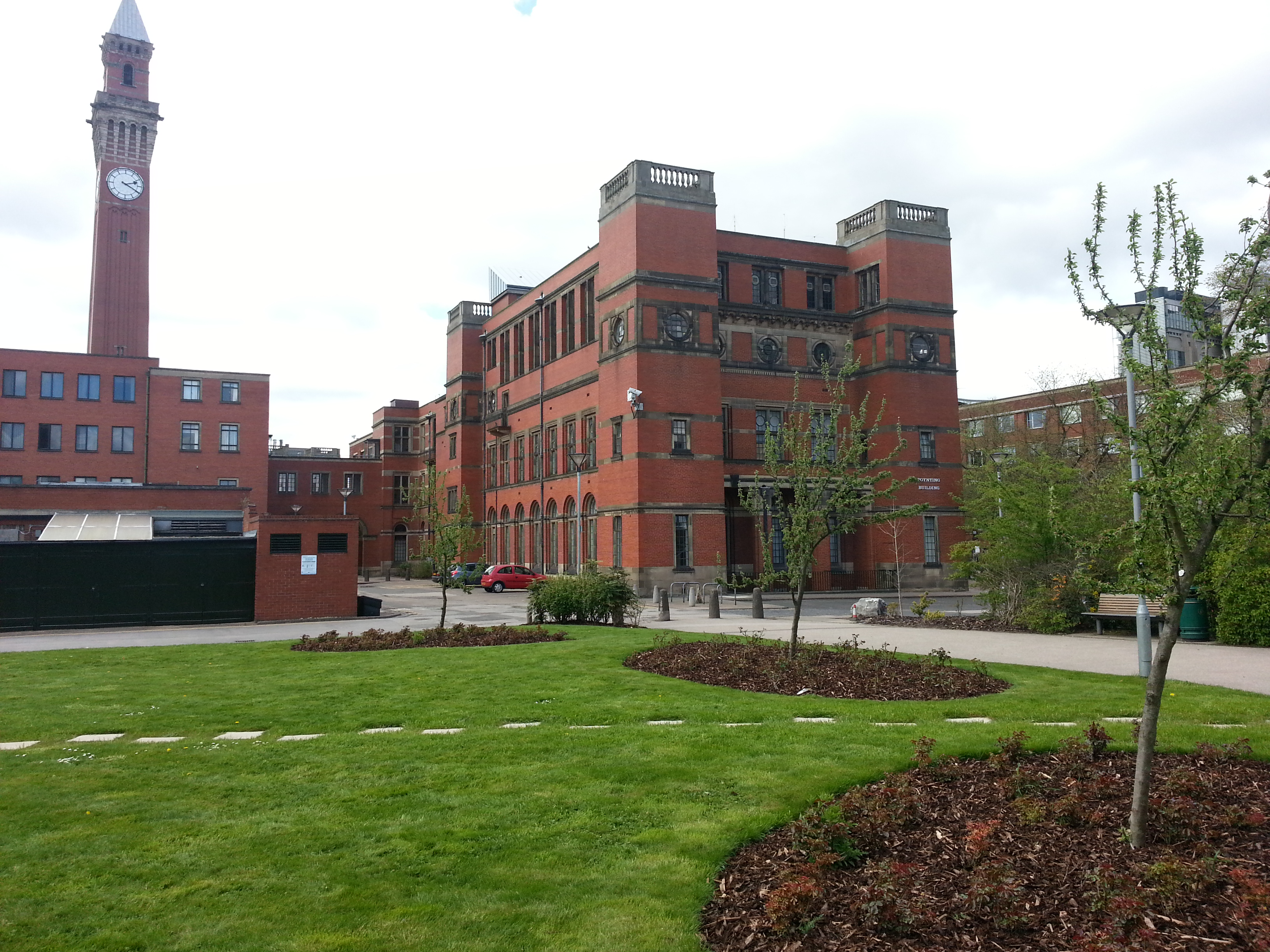
Right: The Poynting Physics building at the University of Birmingham. Left: The Nuffield building where Peierls and Frisch wrote the Memorandum

As enemy aliens, at least until Peierls' naturalisation papers came through in February 1940, Frisch and Peierls were excluded from the most important—and secret—war work being done by Oliphant's team at Birmingham, that on radar. However, Oliphant would ask Peierls a theoretical question about, say, the solution to Maxwell's equations in a hemispheric cavity. Peierls knew that questions of this nature related to the work on microwave radar, and Oliphant was doubtless aware of this too, but the façade of secrecy was maintained. The nuclear investigation was not yet secret, so Frisch was available to work on it. He began experimenting with uranium enrichment through thermal diffusion, a process first demonstrated in Germany by Klaus Clusius. Progress was slow; the required equipment was not available, and the radar project had first call on the available resources.

Francis Perrin had defined a critical mass of uranium to be the smallest amount that could sustain a chain reaction. He calculated the value for triuranium octoxide with natural isotopic ratio i.e. unenriched. However, he greatly overestimated the "average number of neutrons produced per fission" value for natural uranium at 3, compared to a modern value of 1.18 due to absorption. This yielded a critical mass of about 40 tonnes (39 long tons; 44 short tons). He reckoned that if a neutron reflector were placed around it of materials such as iron or lead which did not greatly impede fast neutrons, this might be reduced to 12 tonnes (12 long tons; 13 short tons). Peierls also attempted to simplify the problem by using the fast neutrons produced by fission, thus omitting consideration of moderator. He then calculated the critical mass of a sphere of uranium metal in a theoretical paper written in 1939. He later recalled that the size of the critical mass "was of the order of tons. It therefore appeared to me that the paper had no relevance to a nuclear weapon."

However, Bohr had argued that the uranium-235 isotope was far more likely to capture neutrons, so fissile even using neutrons of low energy. Frisch wondered what would happen if he were able to produce a sphere of pure uranium-235. When he used Peierls' formula to calculate this, he received a startling answer. Peierls later observed that:

Any competent nuclear physicist would have come out with very similar answers to ours if he had been asked: "What is the likely fission cross-section of pure U235? What critical size for separated U235 follows from this? What will be the explosive power of such a mass? How much industrial effort would be needed to do the separation? And would the military value be worthwhile?" The only unusual thing that Frisch and I did at this point was ask those questions.

Realising the sensitive nature of the document, Peierls typed it himself. One carbon copy was made. Today the original is in the Bodleian Library at Oxford University.

=== Non-technical ===
The memorandum was written in two parts. The first was an elegant and comprehensive outline of the implications of their calculations. It included a proposal that the best defence against such a weapon would be to develop one before Germany did so. In a few short pages these two scientists anticipated the policies of deterrence which would shape Cold War geopolitics. The second was an explanation of the science supporting their conclusions. The memorandum opens with:

The attached detailed report concerns the possibility of constructing a "super-bomb" which utilises the energy stored in atomic nuclei as a source of energy. The energy liberated in the explosion of such a super-bomb is about the same as that produced by the explosion of 1,000 tons of dynamite. This energy is liberated in a small volume, in which it will, for an instant, produce a temperature comparable to that in the interior of the sun. The blast from such an explosion would destroy life in a wide area. The size of this area is difficult to estimate, but it will probably cover the centre of a big city.

In addition, some part of the energy set free by the bomb goes to produce radioactive substances, and these will emit very powerful and dangerous radiations. The effects of these radiations is greatest immediately after the explosion, but it decays only gradually and even for days after the explosion any person entering the affected area will be killed.

Some of this radioactivity will be carried along with the wind and will spread the contamination; several miles downwind this may kill people.

This section also contains an early description of the possibility of fizzles caused by predetonation, and dismisses concerns about enemy reverse engineering as even such fizzles would destroy the weapon.

=== Calculations ===
Peierls' starting point was a paper by Francis Perrin, in which he had derived critical mass calculations in terms of nuclear constants. The physicists considered a sphere, which has the minimum surface area for a given volume. A critical mass occurs when the number of neutrons produced equals the number that escape. Perrin assumed that the mean free path was much larger than the radius of the sphere. Peierls did not agree, and commenced his own calculations. A key insight came from Frisch, who wondered what would happen if, instead of natural uranium, a sphere of the uranium-235 isotope was used. By definition, the mean free path is:

$$\ell = 1/\sigma n ,$$

where ℓ is the mean free path, n is the number of target particles per unit volume, and σ is the effective fission cross section area. Peierls did not perform the calculation, leaving this task to Frisch. The chemistry of uranium was not well known at the time, and Frisch believed that its density was 15 grams per cubic centimetre (0.54 lb/cu in); the true value is approximately 19 grams per cubic centimetre (0.69 lb/cu in). The fission cross section value was more problematic. For this, Frisch turned to a 1939 Nature article by L. A. Goldstein, A. Rogozinski and R. J. Walen at the Radium Institute in Paris, who gave a value of (11.2±1.5)×10^{−24} cm^{2}. This was too large by an order of magnitude; a modern value is about 1.24×10^{−24} cm^{2}. Using the values he had, Frisch calculated the value of the mean free path for uranium-235 using the Avogadro constant:

$$\ell = 1 / (1 \times 10^{-23}\ \mathrm{cm^{2}})(15\ \mathrm{g\ cm^{-3}})(6 \times 10^{23}\ \mathrm{mol^{-1}} / 235\ \mathrm{g\ mol^{-1}}) = 235/90\ \mathrm{cm} = 2.6\ \mathrm{cm} .$$

Peierls and Frisch claimed that the critical radius was about 0.8 times the mean free path. From this, Frisch could calculate the volume of the sphere from the well-known equation:

$$V = \frac{4}{3}\pi r^3 = \frac{4}{3}\pi (2.6 \times 0.8\ \mathrm{cm})^3 \approx 38\ \mathrm{cm^3} .$$

The mass then comes out to be:

$$38\ \mathrm{cm^3} \times 15 \mathrm{g\ cm^{-3}} = 570\ \mathrm{g} \approx 600\ \mathrm{g} .$$

Frisch and Peierls then considered the speed of a uranium fission chain reaction, exponential in nature, where "τ is the time required for the neutron density to multiply by a factor e." The available data was very approximate, but their central point – that a bomb was possible using fast (~2 MeV) neutrons – remains. Jeremy Bernstein remarked of this effort: "Let me make the same point by asking a somewhat different question but using the correct numbers. How much time does it take to fission a kilogram of ^{235}U using fast neutrons?" Using modern values he found that to be "equal to about a microsecond, which makes the point about the rapidity of fission with fact [sic] neutrons".

In the original memorandum, if the neutrons had velocities of 10^{9} cm/s, then they would have an average time between fission collisions of 2.6×10^{−9} s. Therefore, Bernstein's time for a kilogram of uranium-235 to fission is found by solving:

$$1000 \times (6 \times 10^{23} /\ 235) = e ^ {t / \tau } ,$$

where τ was the mean time for fission neutron density to increase by e. Given the doubling time

$$t^{1/2} = 2.6 \times 10^{-9} \mathrm{s} ,$$

this implied a mean fission exponential folding time of

$$\tau = t^{1/2} / ln(2) \approx 4.0 \times 10^{-9}\ \mathrm{s} .$$

This led to a calculation of the energy released, which Peierls reckoned as approximately:

$$E = 0.2 M (r^2/\tau^2) (\sqrt {(r / r_0 )} - 1) ,$$

where M is the mass of the sphere, r is the radius, and r_{0} is the critical mass radius.

The conclusion drawn was that a few kilograms would explode with the energy of thousands of tons of dynamite.

== Inaccuracies ==
In a 1967 interview, Frisch described the selection of the Radium Institute's fission cross section value, and thus low critical mass and radius, as an intentional overestimate:

"And I then went and took a formula which Peierls had published on the critical size of fissile material, and I put in a vastly optimistic figure for the fission cross section and came out with a critical mass of one pound."

Additionally, they assumed the complete bomb assembly to rely on triggering via cosmic rays. This was thought to be the inevitable activation method of bombs and critical-state reactors, as the discovery of spontaneous fission in uranium would only be made later in July 1940.

== Influence ==
The memorandum was given to Oliphant, who passed it on to Tizard in his capacity as the chairman of the Committee for the Scientific Survey of Air Warfare (CSSAW). He in turn passed it to Thomson, the chairman of the committee to which the CSSAW had delegated responsibility for uranium research. Thomson's committee was about to disband. It had studied nuclear reactions in uranium, and the use of graphite as a neutron moderator in a nuclear reactor, but its results had been negative, and it had concluded that the rate of capture of neutrons by the graphite was too great to make such a reactor a practical proposition. The Frisch–Peierls memorandum caused Thomson to reconsider. After discussions between Cockcroft, Oliphant and Thomson, CSSAW created the MAUD Committee to investigate further. As enemy aliens, Peierls and Frisch were initially excluded from its deliberations, but they were later added to its technical subcommittee.

The research from the MAUD committee was compiled in two reports, commonly known as the MAUD reports in July 1941. The first report, "Use of Uranium for a Bomb", discussed the feasibility of creating a super-bomb from uranium, which they now thought to be real. The second, "Use of Uranium as a Source of Power" discussed the idea of using uranium as a source of power, not just a bomb. The MAUD Committee and report helped bring about the British nuclear program, the Tube Alloys project. Not only did it help start a nuclear project in Britain but it helped jump-start the American project. Without the help of the MAUD Committee the American program, the Manhattan Project, would have started months behind. Instead they were able to begin thinking about how to create a bomb, not whether it was possible. Historian Margaret Gowing noted that "events that change a time scale by only a few months can nevertheless change history."

In August 1941, Oliphant was sent to the US to assist the Americans with microwave radar. He took the initiative to enlighten the scientific community there of the ground-breaking discoveries of the MAUD Committee. He travelled to Berkeley to meet with his friend Ernest Lawrence, who soon caught his enthusiasm. Oliphant convinced the Americans to move forward with nuclear weapons, and his lobbying resulted in Vannevar Bush taking the report directly to the president. Leo Szilard later wrote: "if Congress knew the true history of the atomic energy project, I have no doubt but that it would create a special medal to be given to meddling foreigners for distinguished services, and that Dr Oliphant would be the first to receive one."
