= Barbara Ruhemann =

German and British anthropologist and physical chemist

Barbara Ruheman
- Born: Barbara Zarniko; 1905; Heiligenbeil, East Prussia
- Died: 1976
- Occupations: Physical chemist, Anthropologist

Barbara Ruhemann (1905 – April 1976) was a German and British physical chemist, anthropologist and translator.

== Early life and physics ==
Barbara (née Zarniko) met Martin Ruhemann while a student in Professor Franz Simon's group at the University of Breslau, and they later married. Kurt Mendelssohn, who had joined Simon's group in 1927, was attracted to Barbara but did not allow feelings to develop for her because of Martin. However, Mendelssohn later met Barbara's youngest sister Jutta and they married in 1932. After earning her PhD in physics under Prof. Simon in 1932, Barbara moved with her husband to Kharkiv. The Ruhemanns had Communist sympathies.

It was in Kharkiv that Barbara gave birth to their son Stephen. To help with the baby Barbara's sister Fransiska, the middle Zarniko daughter, came to stay with the Ruhemanns in Kharkiv. It was here Fransiska met and later married James Crowther who became one of the founders of science journalism.

László Tisza recalled the Ruhemans being a part of a low temperature group focusing on industrial applications at Ukrainian Physics and Technology Institute (UPTI) in the 1930's. In 1937 the Ruhemanns co-wrote the book Low Temperature Physics which was reviewed favourably at the time.

There is evidence that Barbara Ruhemann and Charlotte Houtermans translated contributions from Soviet physicists into German for the journal Physikalische Zeitschrift der Sowjetunion, which became their journal of choice once publication in Zeitschrift für Physik was prohibited when Adolf Hitler came to power in 1933.

As the Great Purge was gaining momentum in 1937 and the Ruhemann's colleagues were disappearing, British-born Martin Ruhemann applied for exit visas for him and his wife, and they were able to move to England in Spring 1938. By the summer of 1938 all three couples (i.e. Zarniko sisters and their husbands) were settled in England.

== Life in England and anthropology ==
Barbara Ruhemann left physical chemistry for anthropology as she went to London and was able to obtain British citizenship. The Ruhemanns separated in 1940.

In 1941 she participated in a two day symposium on the intersection of Marxist thought with the natural and social sciences. The first day focused on Friedrich Engels' works Dialectics of Nature and The Origin of the Family and the second day on concepts first illuminated by Lewis Morgan, who was one of the first to contrast a universal form of society based on clan organization and matrilineal succession as opposed to that of nuclear family. This symposium brought together imminent scientists, philosophers, and communicators of the day including Arthur Eddington, James Jeans, Hyman Levy, Joseph Needham, Alfred North Whitehead, J. B. S. Haldane, George Paget Thomson, and Benjamin Farrington. At this symposium Ruhemann discussed the economic origins of the universal totemism that accompanied clan organization.

Ruhemann corresponded with Haldane, who wrote articles for the Daily Worker, where she questioned the scientific basis of eugenics calling it pseudoscience and favoured arguments of Lysenko, acknowledging the limits of Lamarckism but stating his approaches could potentially help overcome inherited genetic weaknesses. Haldane responded disagreeing with the characterization of eugenics as pseudoscience, and Ruhemann responds that pseudoscience is not just confined to eugenics but also anthropology. In her correspondence she notes wanting a more scientific approach to biology noting physics approaches to studying light as an example.

In 1945, she appears to be the first anthropologist to submit kinship systems to proper mathematical analysis, a task that André Weil, a mathematician, led in parallel on behalf of French anthropologist Claude Lévi-Strauss for his Elementary Structures of Kinship (1949).

She was one of the translators of Letters of the Young Engels, 1838-1845, and of several volumes of the Marx & Engels Collected Works.

== Bibliography ==
- Ruhemann, Barbara (1932). Die Kristallstrukturen von Krypton, Xenon, Jodwasserstoff, und Bromwasserstoff in ihrer Abhängigkeit von der Temperatur (PhD thesis). Friedrich-Wilhelms Universität zu Berlin.
- Ruhemann, Barbara; Simon, Franz (1932). "Die Kristallstrukturen von Krypton, Xenon, Jodwasserstoff und Bromwasserstoff in ihrer Abhängigkeit von der Temperatur". Zeitschrift für Physikalische Chemie, Abteilung B. 15 (6): 389–413. doi:10.1515/zpch-1932-1534.
- Ruhemann, Martin; Ruhemann, Barbara (1937). Low Temperature Physics. Cambridge: At the University Press.
- Ruhemann, Barbara (1945). "A Method for Analyzing Classificatory Kinship Systems". Southwestern Journal of Anthropology. 1 (4): 532–576. doi:10.1086/soutjanth.1.4.3628797.
- Ruhemann, Barbara (1948). "The Relationship Terms of Some Hill Tribes of Burma and Assam". Southwestern Journal of Anthropology. 4 (2): 155–198. doi:10.1086/soutjanth.4.2.3628710. JSTOR 3628710.
- Ruhemann, Barbara (May 1948). "Ghost Marriages". Man. 48: 60. JSTOR 2793248.
- Ruhemann, Barbara (1967). "Purpose and mathematics - A problem in the analysis of classificatory kinship systems". Bijdragen tot de Taal-, Land- en Volkenkunde. 123 (1): 83–124. doi:10.1163/22134379-90002912. JSTOR 27860668.
