= Alfred Salenger =

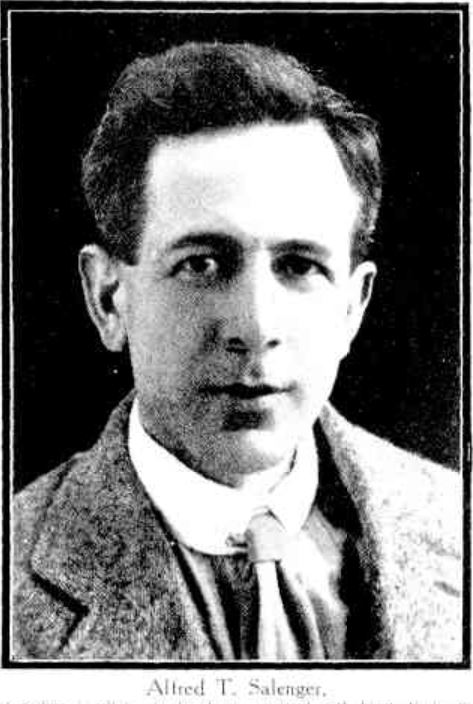
Alfred Salenger, 1918

Alfred Theodore Salenger BEM (1879–1961) was the first Australian awarded the Order of the British Empire for his role in inventing a bomb-thrower for use in trench warfare in World War I. He was a designer and a partner in the firm of Messrs. Salenger Brothers – wholesale jewellers, of George Street, Sydney.

== Early life ==
Salenger was born in Victoria, Australia in 1879 to warehouseman Julius Salenger and his wife Evelyn nee Beaver. His grandfather Louis Beaver (previously Bibergeil) was an inventor and proprietor of jewellery stores in Manchester in England. An uncle was the architect Isidor George Beaver. Constance Beaver, an aunt, was the mother of Harry Nathan, 1st Baron Nathan. Salenger's brother Herbert Michael Salenger was a partner of the firm of Messrs. Biddulph and Salenger, solicitors, of Sydney.

== Career ==
Salenger was a partner in the firm of Messrs.Salenger Bros. – wholesale jewellers, of George Street Sydney.

In 1916 he began collaborating with Lieut. W. H. Gregory Geake who had invented an improved bomb-thrower for use in trench warfare. Together they embarked from Sydney on the RMS Kaisar-i-Hind, arriving in England on 1 February 1917. They worked on many inventions for the A.I.F. Research Section of the British Munitions Inventions Department at Claremont Park, Esher. The men of this section became known as the "Safety Seconds", for putting results before their own safety. Salenger was responsible for restricting a fire which occurred while carrying out experiments, but there was an explosion that severed his fingers and badly injured the other arm. He was hospitalised for 2 months. He was cared for at Kingston Infirmary in Surrey, alongside military casualties. Subsequently Colonel Henry Edward Goold-Adams, Comptroller of Munitions Inventions, wrote to him saying that "the injury you have unfortunately sustained is just as much a credit to yourself and those that come after you as if the loss of your fingers had occurred in the field by the action of the enemy".

Salenger Bros. were the Australian agents for the National Diamond Factories (Bernard Oppenheimer), Ltd., of London. Sir Bernard Oppenheimer established a scheme for training disabled war veterans, many of whom were amputees, in the skills of diamond cutting and polishing.

== Order of the British Empire ==
In the 1918 New Year Honours Salenger was awarded the Order of the British Empire for "courage and self-sacrifice in volunteering for work on dangerous experiments, in the course of which he lost four fingers". The Most Excellent Order of the British Empire is a British order of chivalry, rewarding contributions to the arts and sciences, work with charitable and welfare organisations, and public service outside the civil service. It was established on 4 June 1917 by King George V. Salenger was the first Australian to receive the award. He received his award in Kingston Town Hall on 29 May 1918 by Surrey's Lord Lieutenant Lord Ashcombe (Henry Cubitt).

== Family ==
Salenger married Ursula May Hutchison in 1912 in Sydney, and they divorced in 1931. In 1947 he married Maud Zell at Darlinghurst, Sydney.

Salenger died on 5 April 1961, aged 81, and is buried at the Rookwood Necropolis in Sydney.
