= HMS Excellent (shore establishment) =

British onshore naval establishment

HMS Excellent
- Whale Island, Portsmouth, Hampshire in England
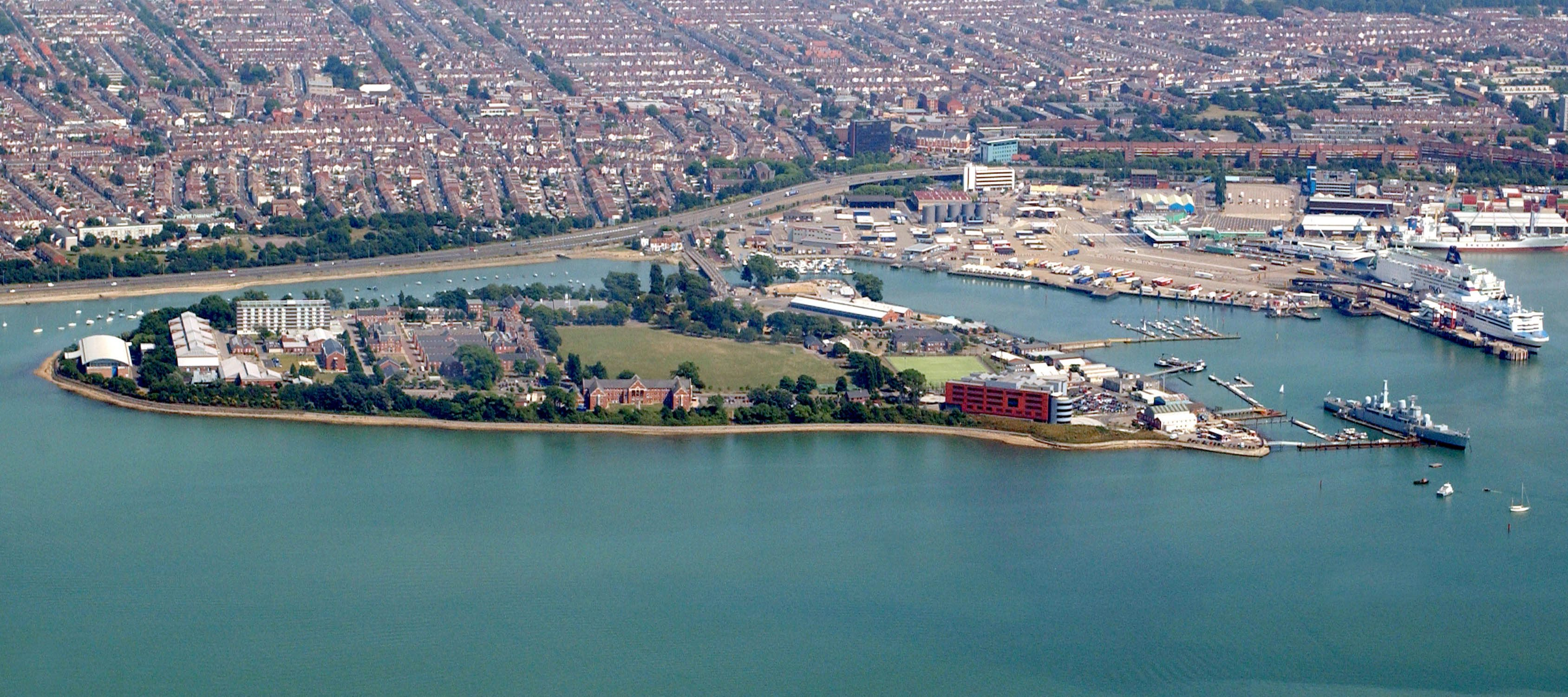
- An aerial photo of HMS Excellent during 2005. The red building is Navy Command Headquarters

Site information
- Type: Naval shore establishment
- Owner: Ministry of Defence
- Operator: Royal Navy
- Condition: Operational
- Website: Official website

Location
- Location in Hampshire
- Coordinates: 50°49′09″N 1°05′48.5″W
- Area: 32 hectares (79 acres)

Site history
- Built: 1885 – 1891
- In use: 1891–present

Garrison information
- Current commander: Commander Simon Turnbull

HMS Excellent is a Royal Navy "stone frigate" (shore establishment) sited on Whale Island near Portsmouth in Hampshire. HMS Excellent is itself part of the Maritime Warfare School, with a headquarters at HMS Collingwood, although a number of lodger units are resident within the site including the offices of the First Sea Lord.

== History ==
=== RN Gunnery School afloat ===
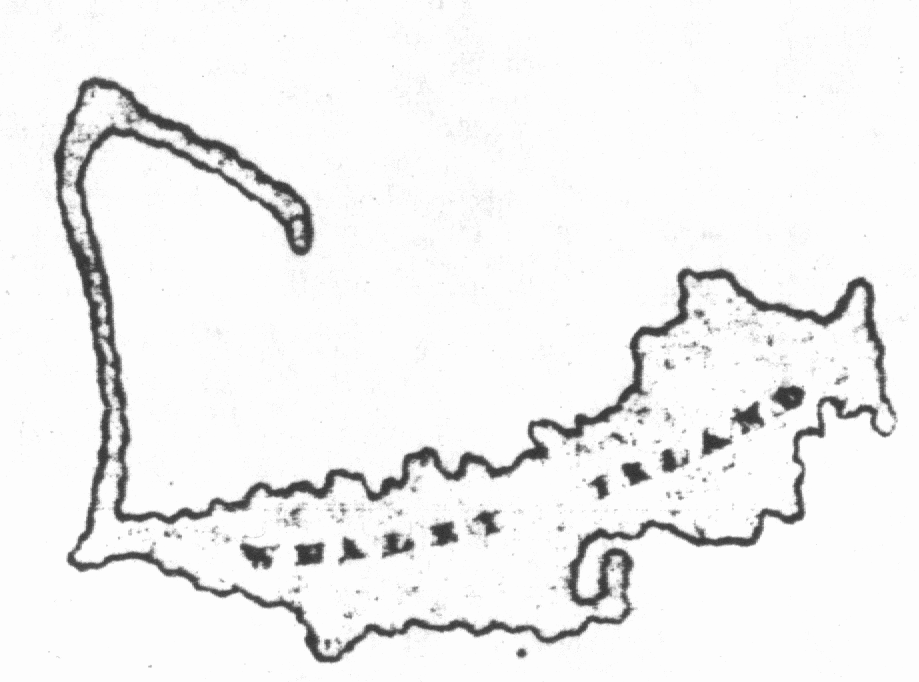
Whaley (later Whale) Island in 1833

In the 1829 a Commander George Smith advocated the establishment of a Naval School of Gunnery; accordingly, the following year, the third-rate HMS Excellent was converted into a training ship and moored just north of Portsmouth Dockyard, opposite Fareham Creek. Smith was given oversight and set up Excellent not only as a training establishment but also as a platform for experimental firing of new weapons (the creek was used as a firing range). In 1832 Smith was replaced in command by Captain Thomas Hastings, under whom the school grew both numerically and in reputation, as trained gunners began to prove their effectiveness in combat situations. In 1834 the original Excellent was replaced by the second rate HMS Boyne which was duly renamed Excellent.

In 1845 Captain Henry Ducie Chads took over command of Excellent in succession to Hastings. He remained in post until 1854, by which time the Admiralty had purchased 'Whaley Island' (which at the time was little more than a sandbank). Chads was succeeded first by Captain Thomas Maitland and then, in 1857, by Richard Hewlett. In December 1859 the first-rate Queen Charlotte took over the role of gunnery training ship and was likewise renamed Excellent.

In 1863 Hewlett was replaced by Captain Astley Cooper Key, who was in turn succeeded by Captain Arthur Hood some three years later. By this time, a rifle range had been established on the island for the use of HMS Excellent and the first building appeared there, the land having been somewhat drained and levelled. Under Hood's leadership a torpedo section was set up within the school; overseen by Commander Jacky Fisher (who would later return to Excellent as commanding officer), this was made a separate establishment, as HMS Vernon, in 1876.

=== RN Gunnery School ashore ===
It was under Fisher's command, in the 1880s, that approval was given to move the gunnery school ashore, on to Whale Island. The initial proposal had come from a Lieutenant Percy Scott, who (having arrived to train as a gunnery lieutenant in 1878) initially used the island as a running track. The island had grown significantly in size since the 1850s: indeed, up until the early 1890s excavated spoil from the expansion of the Dockyard was routinely conveyed there, using convict labour, to build the island up. Scott returned to Excellent as an instructor in 1883 and took the opportunity to submit a detailed proposal to Fisher which was accepted. (Later in his career Scott was again posted to HMS Excellent on two occasions, returning first as Commander in 1890 and then as Captain of the establishment in the early 1900s.)

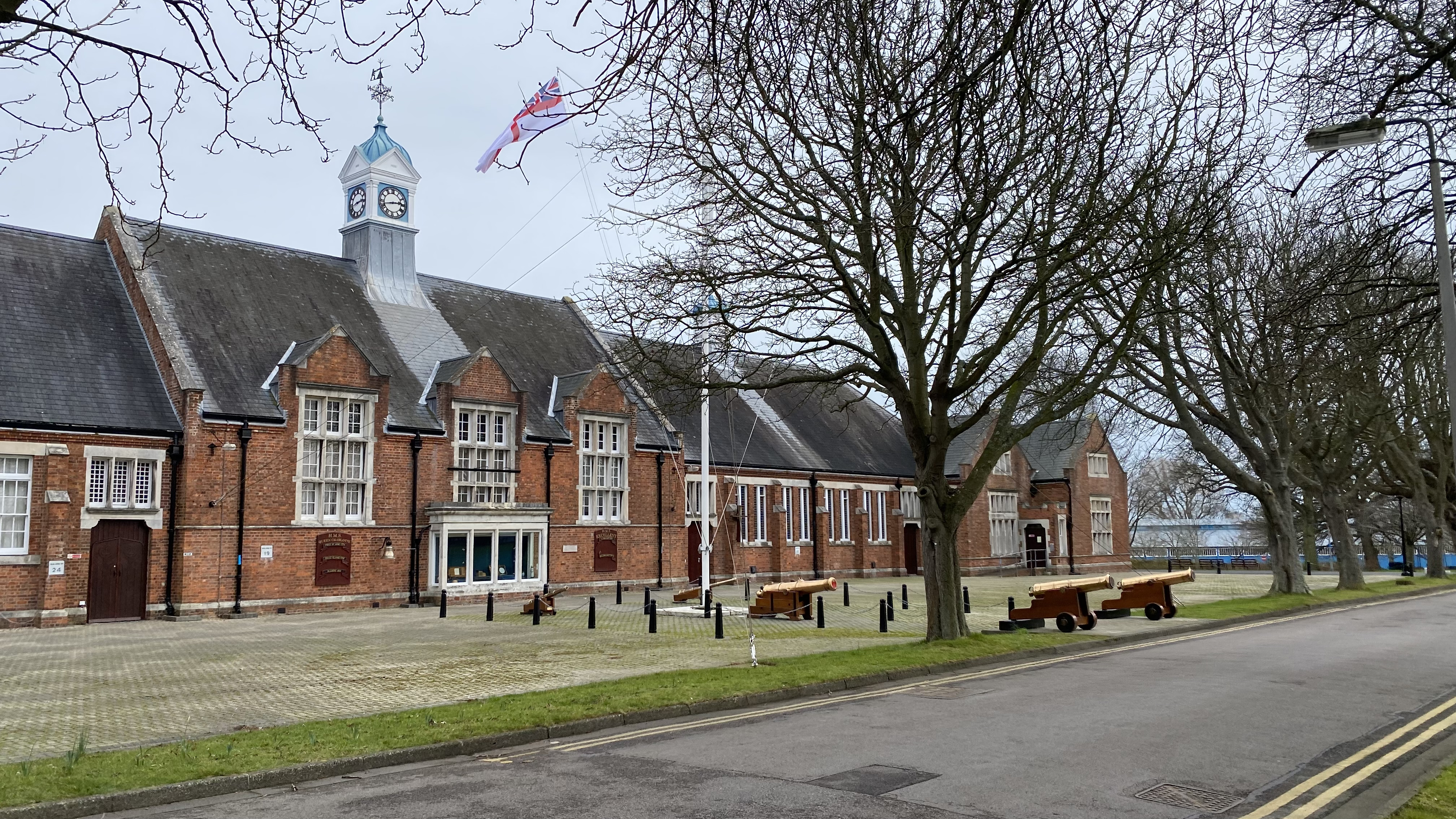
HMS Excellent: the Quarterdeck Block (originally containing a gymnasium, lecture theatre, warrant officers' mess, church rooms and the Church of St Barbara).

The first buildings of the shore establishment were begun in 1885, including what is now known as the Quarterdeck Block. Building work then continued alongside the tasks of draining and levelling the land (the site was known colloquially as 'Mud Island'). By 1891 the whole operation had moved ashore and the old ship was paid off. Centred on a large open drill ground, the site includes the officers' mess in a range to the north with rows of barracks blocks for ratings (demolished and rebuilt c. 2010) arrayed behind. To the west, opposite the Quarterdeck, were long gun battery sheds; the long low drill shed to the south is a listed building (1892). Firing training took place on the batteries and all different varieties of guns were kept on site for instruction on their maintenance and operation. During the 2 February 1901 funeral of Queen Victoria sailors from HMS Excellent provided an honour guard. When the horses of the Royal Artillery intended to pull the gun carriage that bore her coffin from Windsor railway station became unmanageable, the sailors took their place, for which King Edward VII conferred the Victoria medal upon them on 16 March 1901 at Portsmouth, at the commencement of a world tour by the Duke and Duchess of Cornwall and York. The Anti-Aircraft Experimental Section of the Munitions Inventions Department was based here from September 1916, under Archibald Hill. Later, full-sized dummy gun turrets were provided for training purposes. Seagoing training also took place up until 1957 on a series of battleships, cruisers and destroyers that were attached to the facility. From the late 1950s guided missile training was also provided.

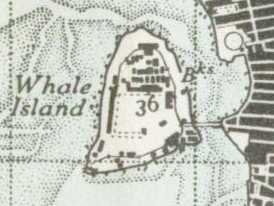
Whale Island in 1945

The Portsmouth Field Gun Crew, competing in the Royal Navy field gun competition at the Royal Tournament, used to be based at the site. A small museum in the Quarterdeck block preserves artefacts from Excellent's days as a gunnery school; among them is the Royal Navy State Funeral Gun Carriage which is drawn by naval ratings at state funerals of monarchs and other distinguished UK citizens.

=== Decommissioning and recommissioning ===
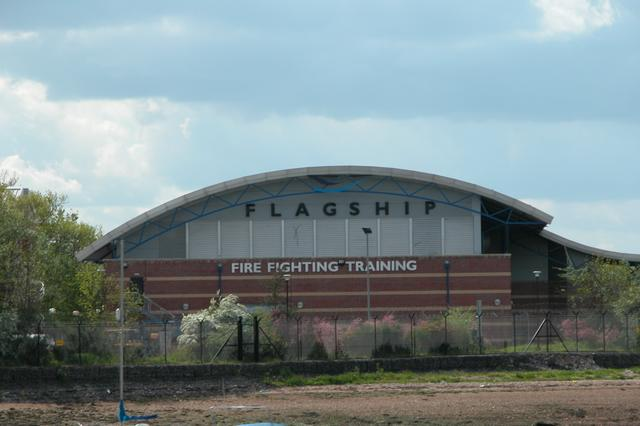
The Royal Navy's Fire Fighting Training Unit has been based at the northern tip of Whale Island since the 1990s.

The gunnery school closed in 1985 whereupon HMS Excellent was decommissioned. The site then became part of HMS Nelson.

The establishment was recommissioned as HMS Excellent in 1994 following the closure of the old HMS Phoenix in nearby Tipner and Horsea Island, and the relocation of the school of Fire Fighting and Damage Control from there to Whale Island.

=== Captains of HMS Excellent ===
The following list goes as far as 1984. It shows the date of appointment, and rank and decorations held at the time. In some cases a captain held several sequential appointments. It does not show captains held on the books of the Excellent who were not commanding officers of Excellent.

List of captains
Name	Date of appointment	Sources
Commander George Smith	19 June 1830	(Note: Supernumerary commander on the books of HMS St Vincent at Portsmouth Navy List corrected to the 20th December 1830, p. 79)
Captain Sir Thomas Hastings	13 April 1832	
Captain Sir Thomas Hastings, Kt	2 December 1834	
Captain Sir Thomas Hastings, Kt	3 June 1842	
Captain Henry D. Chads	28 August 1845	
Captain Henry Ducie Chads, KB	1 July 1847	
Captain Henry Ducie Chads, KB	1 July 1851	
Captain Sir Thomas Maitland, KB	17 January 1854	
Captain Richard S. Hewlett, CB	29 June 1857	
Captain Richard S. Hewlett, CB	31 December 1859	
Captain Astley C. Key, CB	30 June 1863	
Captain Astley Cooper Key, CB	1 January 1866	
Captain Arthur W.A. Hood	3 September 1866	
Captain Henry Boys	13 July 1869	
Captain Thomas Brandreth	18 May 1874	
Captain Frederick A. Herbert	1 January 1877	
Captain John O. Hopkins	4 March 1880	
Captain William Codrington, CB, AdC	21 June 1881	
Captain John A. Fisher, CB	6 April 1883	
Captain Compton E. Domvile, AdC	1 November 1886	
Captain Hugo L. Pearson, ADC	12 June 1890	
Captain Lewis A. Beaumont	12 June 1893	
Captain Archibald L. Douglas	3 July 1894	
Captain Edmund F. Jeffreys	9 November 1895	
Captain William H. May, MVO	10 August 1897	
Captain Arthur Barrow, AdC	21 November 1900	
Captain Percy M. Scott, CVO, CS, LL.D, AdC	1 April 1903	
Captain Frederick T. Hamilton, MVO, AdC	6 March 1905	
Captain Reginald G.O. Tupper, AdC.	15 July 1907	
Captain Frederick C.T. Tudor, AdC.	18 August 1910	
Captain Morgan Singer, AdC.	1 June 1912	
Captain Cole C. Fowler	19 August 1914	
Captain H. Ralf Crooke	23 May 1917	
Captain Robert N. Bax CB	13 June 1918	
Captain Francis H. Mitchell DSO	13 June 1920	
Captain Arthur J. Davies	18 August 1922	
Captain Hon M.R. Best DSO MVO	15 August 1924	
Captain F.L. Tottenham CBE	14 August 1926	
Captain Charles A. Scott	20 August 1928	
Captain G.C.C. Royle CMG	7 May 1930	
Captain E.O.B.S. Osborne DSO ADC	26 July 1932	
Captain A. Francis Pridham	18 July 1933	
Captain Arthur J. Power CVO	3 October 1935	
Captain H.M. Burrough	20 September 1937	
Captain A.F.E. Palliser DSC	19 December 1938	
Captain Eric J.P. Brind	15 May 1940	
Captain Oliver Bevir	28 November 1940	
Captain H.A. Packer	15 June 1941	
Captain R.D. Oliver CB DSC	15 January 1943	
Captain W.G. Agnew CB DSO	23 February 1944	
Captain W.R. Slayter CB DSO DSC	3 September 1945	
Captain P.V. McLaughlin DSO	7 January 1947	
Captain S.H. Carlill DSO	5 January 1949	
Captain Robert F. Elkins OBE	11 April 1950	
Captain Varyl C. Begg DSC	12 April 1952	
Captain A. Davies	1954	
Captain W.F.H.C. Rutherford DSO	11 March 1954	
Captain R. Casement OBE	2 January 1956	
Captain H.C. Martell CBE	21 January 1958	
Captain J.S. Dalglish CVO	7 September 1959	
Captain John G. Wells DSC	3 August 1961	
Captain H.H. Dannreuther	8 February 1963	
Captain Arthur M. Power MBE	15 October 1964	
Captain W.J.M. Teale	31 August 1966	
Captain G.R. Villar DSC	10 January 1969	
Captain P.D. Nichol	11 November 1970	
Captain R.S. Falconer	18 September 1972	
Captain M.C.M. Mansergh	28 October 1974	
Captain Peter Lucas	15 October 1976	
Captain Richard K.S. Bethell OBE	10 October 1978	
Captain J.J. Streatfeild-James	1980?	
Captain J.T. Lord CBE	1982?	

== Elements within the site ==
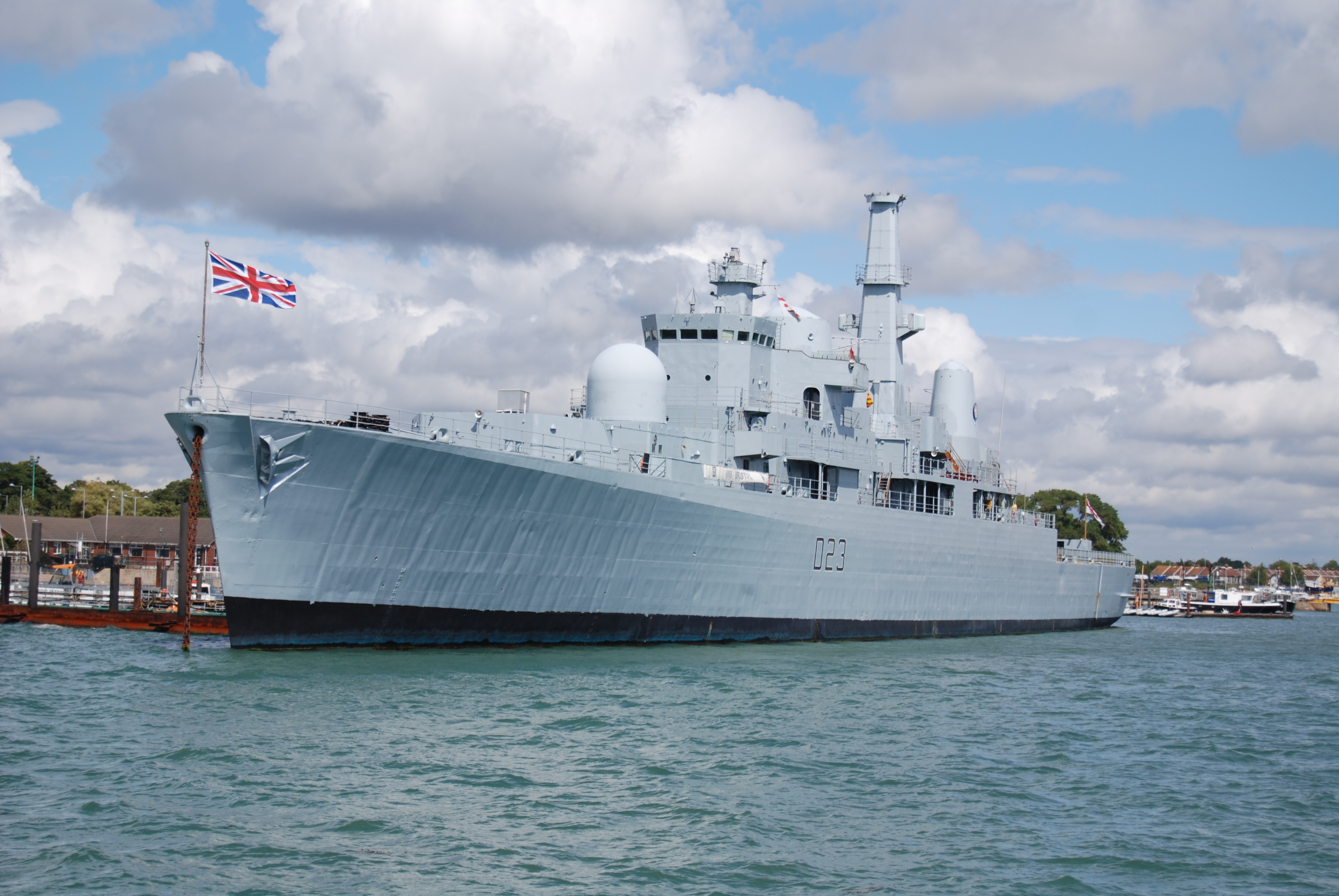
HMS Bristol alongside Whale Island.

Maritime Warfare School elements within the site are:

- MWS Phoenix school of Nuclear, Biological and Chemical Defence, damage control and fire fighting HMS Phoenix
- South East Naval Military Training Centre
- Defence Diving School Boat Section

HMS Excellent also provides administrative and infrastructure support to the Maritime Warfare School elements at Defence Diving School, Horsea Island, and small arms ranges at Tipner.

== Lodger units ==
Lodger units are:

- Navy Command Headquarters – Fleet Commander
- Headquarters of UK Maritime Battle Staff
- Fleet Regional Photographic Unit (South East Region)
- DASA (Navy Branch): Defence Analytical Services and Advice is a Division of the MOD tasked with providing statistical and analytical support to the Navy Statistical Publications produced by DASA Navy

== Cadets ==
HMS Excellent is home to a number of Royal Navy cadet units:

- Volunteer Cadet Corps
  - Portsmouth Division Royal Marines Volunteer Cadet Corps
  - HMS Excellent Royal Naval Volunteer Cadet Corps
- TS Alamein Sea Cadet Corps
- Sea Cadet Corps National Training Centre

== Sources ==
- Lavery, Brian (1983). The Ship of the Line – Volume 1: The development of the battlefleet 1650–1850. Conway Maritime Press. ISBN 0-85177-252-8.
- Lloyd, Christopher (1955). The Origins of H.M.S. Excellent.
