= Anti-Aircraft Experimental Section =

Defunct British government body

The Anti-Aircraft Experimental Section of the Munitions Inventions Department was an organisation set up within Lloyd George's Ministry of Munitions in early 1916. Originally based at Northholt aerodrome, in May 1916 the section moved to the National Physical Laboratory at Bushy House, Teddington before moving to HMS Excellent on Whale Island near Portsmouth in Hampshire in September 1916. The section was led by the physiologist A. V. Hill, who was previously a Captain in the Cambridgeshire Regiment. While on leave suffering from flu in January 1916, Horace Darwin approached him to work on anti-aircraft measures. Hill accepted and started to find the personnel for the unit, which acquired the nickname "Hill's Brigands".

== Staff ==
Members of the section included Ralph H. Fowler Douglas Hartree, Arthur Milne and James Crowther.

== Precursors ==
Horace Darwin's brother Leonard Darwin had been an officer in the Royal Engineers. In the 1880s he had developed a method of locating the position of a military balloon according to the x, y and z axes of Cartesian co-ordinates.
