= Heinrich Gerhard Kuhn =

German-born British physicist

- Born: 10 March 1904; Breslau, German Empire (now Wrocław, Poland)
- Died: 26 August 1994 (aged 90); Oxford, United Kingdom
- Education: University of Greifswald; University of Göttingen
- Awards: Holweck Prize (1967); Fellow of the Royal Society (1954)
- Scientific career
- Fields: Physicist
- Workplaces: Clarendon Laboratory; Balliol College, Oxford
- Thesis: Absorptionspektrum und Dissoziationswarmen von Halogenmolekül (1926)
- Doctoral advisor: James Franck

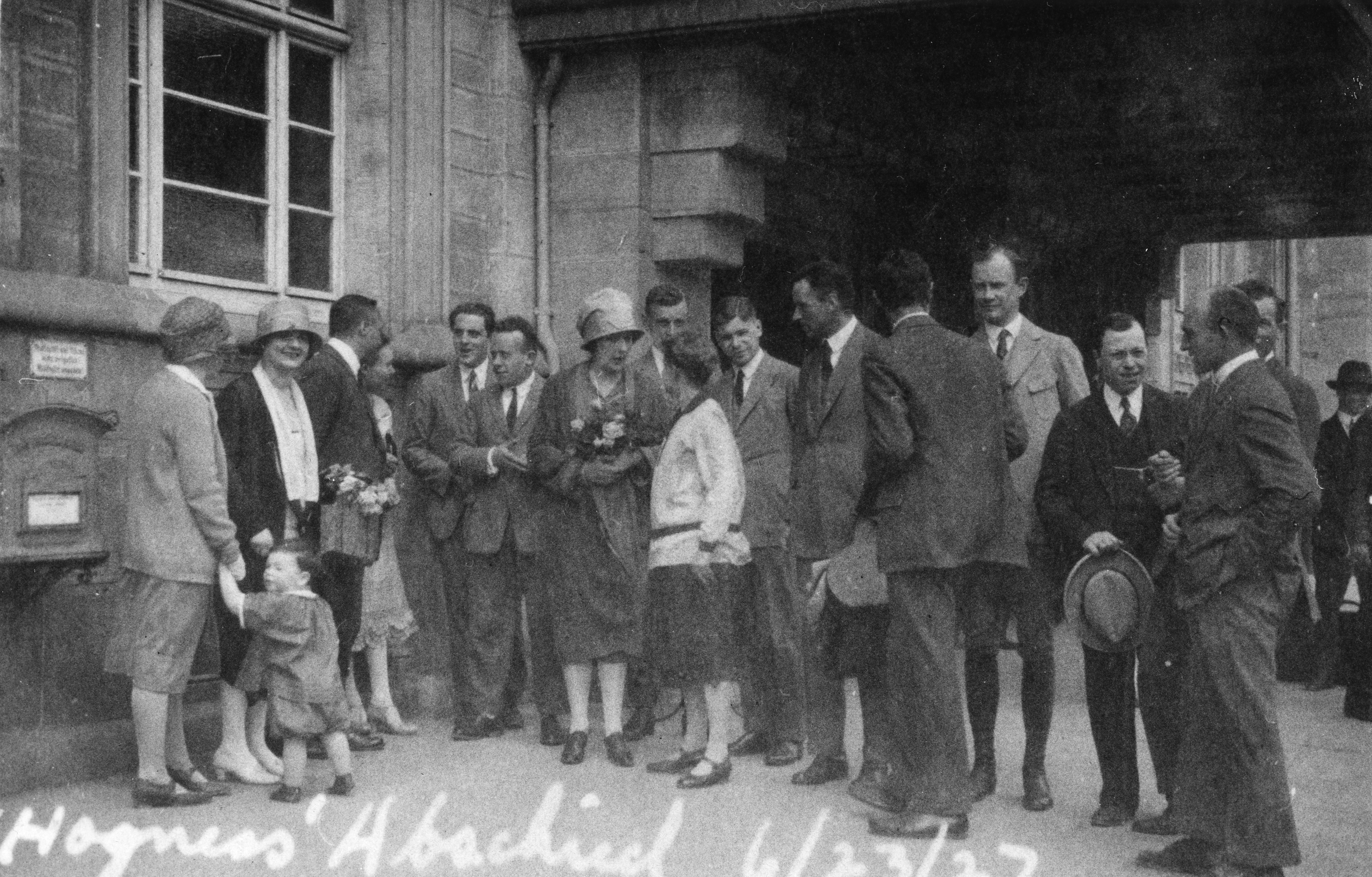
Heinrich Kuhn, Robert Oppenheimer and James Franck, in Göttingen, 23 June 1927

Heinrich Gerhard Kuhn FRS (10 March 1904 – 25 August 1994) was a British physicist. A graduate of the University of Göttingen, where he studied for his doctorate under the direction of James Franck, winner of the 1925 Nobel Prize for Physics, he left Germany after the Nazi Party came to power there in 1933, and moved to Britain, where relatives had settled, becoming a British subject in 1939. At the invitation of Frederick Alexander Lindemann, he worked for Imperial Chemical Industries at the Clarendon Laboratory in Oxford, where he studied hyperfine structure. During the Second World War, he worked on isotope separation for Tube Alloys and the Manhattan Project. He was the first physicist to become a fellow at Balliol College, Oxford, in 1950, and published textbooks on atomic spectra in German in 1934 and English in 1962.

== Biography ==
Heinrich Gerhard Kuhn was born in Breslau, Germany, on 10 March 1904, the second son of Wilhelm Felix Kuhn, a rechtsanwalt (lawyer) and notary public, and his wife Marthe née Hoppe. His older brother Helmut Kuhn became a philosophy professor. His paternal grandmother was Charlotte Kuhn née Henschel, the half-sister of George Henschel, a musician who emigrated to Britain.

Much of Kuhn's early life was spent in Lüben, where he went to school and attended the Real-Gymnasium. He passed his abitur in March 1922 and entered the University of Greifswald intending to study chemistry. In 1924, he decided to switch to physics and moved to the University of Göttingen, where there was a thriving school of physics that had included Nobel Prize winners Max Born, James Franck, Gustav Hertz and Peter Debye. Kuhn's teachers included David Hilbert, Richard Courant and Carl Runge and he joined Franck's research group which included Hertha Sponer, Arthur R. von Hippel, Otto Oldenberg and Fritz Houtermans. Franck had recently published a theory of electron motion and diatomic molecules, and at his suggestion Kuhn studied the absorption spectra of chlorine (Cl_{2}) and bromine (Br_{2}). His results confirmed the Franck–Condon principle and formed his 1926 doctoral thesis on Absorptionspektrum und Dissoziationswarmen von Halogenmolekül (Absorption spectra and dissociation warming of halogen molecules).

Kuhn became a demonstrator at Göttingen in 1926, and then a lecturer in 1931. He continued his studies of the Franck–Condon principle and the Stark effect for his habilitation in February 1931, which allowed him to become a privatdozent. He married Marie Bertha Nohl, the daughter of the Göttingen philosophy professor Herman Nohl and cousin of Ludwig Wittgenstein and Paul Wittgenstein. Although his father was Jewish, he had been baptised when he married, and Kuhn was brought up as a Christian. This meant little when the Nazi Party came to power in Germany in 1933. Kuhn was classified as non-Aryan because he had two Jewish grandparents. He was dismissed from his university positions, and his habilitation was revoked. As a decorated veteran of the First World War, Franck was not dismissed from his post, but elected to resign in protest rather than dismiss colleagues for their race or political beliefs.

Before leaving Germany, Franck attempted to find positions for his former students and colleagues. He introduced Kuhn to Professor Frederick Lindemann, 1st Viscount Cherwell, Scientific Adviser to Winston Churchill, who invited Kuhn to come to the Clarendon laboratory at Oxford University, where he could work on atomic spectra with Derek Jackson. Kuhn and his wife left Germany for Britain in August 1933. They were welcomed by his relatives, the Henschels, and Kuhn received a grant of £400 per annum from ICI, initially for two years, but it was extended to three, and then six. His two sons, Anselm Thomas and Nicholas John, were born in Britain. They attended Dragon School and St Edward's, and entered Balliol College, Oxford, where they earned doctorates. Kuhn became a naturalised British subject in 1939. At the Clarendon laboratory, Jackson and Kuhn studied the hyperfine structure and Zeeman effects of the light elements such a lithium, sodium and potassium.

In 1940, Kuhn joined a team led by Francis Simon that also included Henry Shull Arms, Nicholas Kurti, and Otto Frisch working on the British nuclear weapons project, known as Tube Alloys. Ironically, foreign-born physicists were assigned this work because they could not initially obtain the required security clearance to work on top-secret projects like radar. Simon's team studied the technology of gaseous diffusion. As part of this work, Kuhn visited the United States, travelling in the bomb bay of a Liberator, in December 1943 and January 1944 to work with the Manhattan Project.

Jackson left Britain for tax purposes after the war, but Kuhn remained at Oxford, where he continued his research into atomic spectra with G.W. Series and G.K. Woodgate. Kuhn had become a lecturer at University College, Oxford, in 1938, and he began tutoring students in physics in 1941. In 1950, Balliol College elected him as its first physics fellow, and its only refugee fellow. He was elected a Fellow of the Royal Society (FRS) in 1954. He became a senior research fellow in 1969, and an emeritus fellow in 1971. He received the Holweck Prize in 1967. Germany restored his habilitation, and he was given the status and pension of a full professor, but he declined offers to return to Germany.

Kuhn had published a textbook on atomic spectra in German, Atomspektren, in 1934. In 1962, he published an updated version, Atomic Spectra, in English; it was still widely used two decades later. He died in Oxford on 26 August 1994 after a long illness.
