= Percy Scott =

Engineer, nobleman and Royal Navy Admiral (1853–1924)

Admiral Sir Percy Scott Bt KCB KCVO
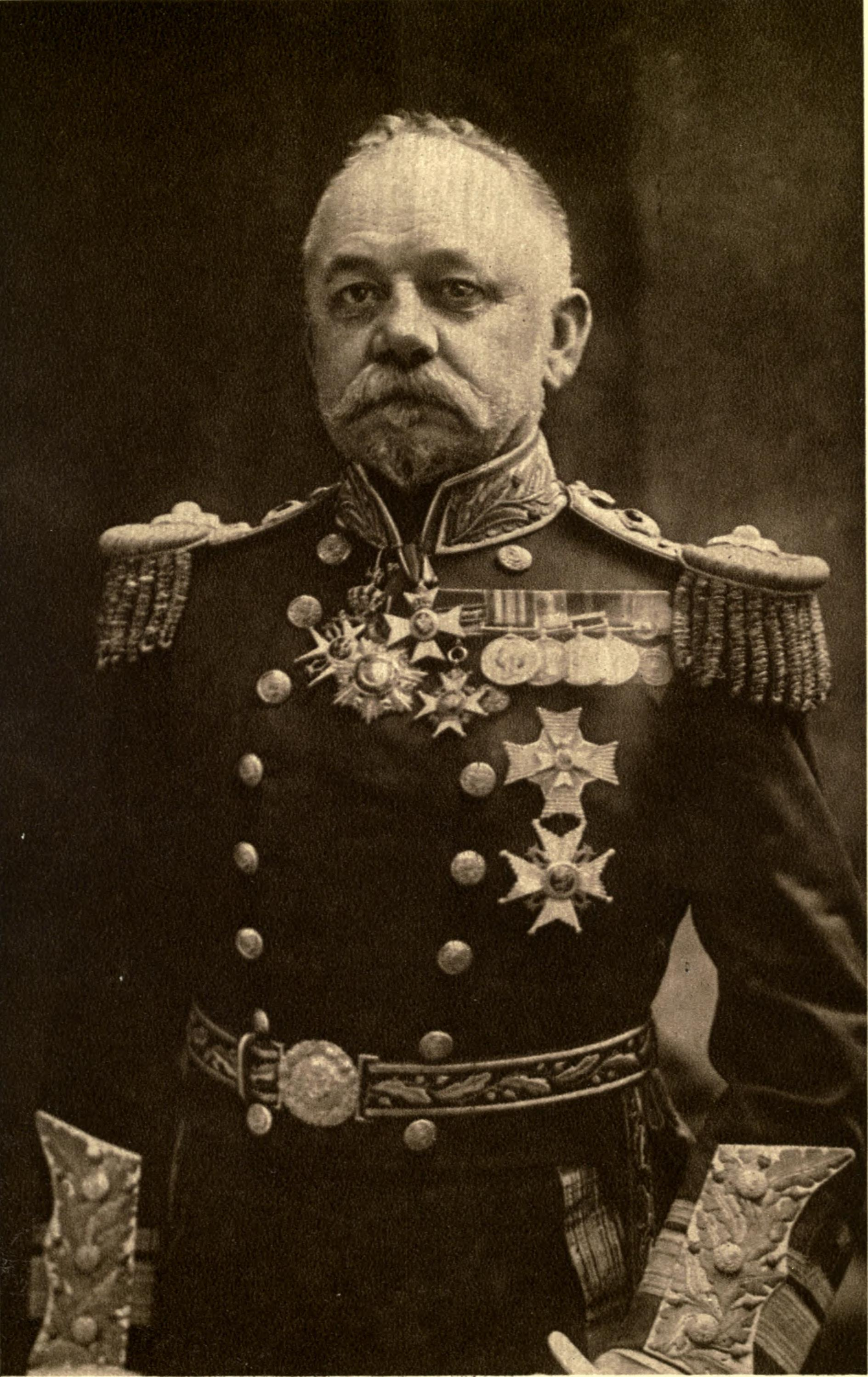
- Born: 10 July 1853; Canonbury, Middlesex
- Died: 18 October 1924 (aged 71); 52, South Audley St, London
- Military career
- Allegiance: United Kingdom
- Branch: Royal Navy
- Service years: 1866–1913; 1914–1916
- Rank: Admiral
- Commands: HMS Scylla, 1896–1899; HMS Terrible, 1899–1902; HMS Excellent, 1903–1905; 1st Cruiser Squadron, 1907–1909; London Air Defence Area, 1915–1916
- Conflicts: Third Ashanti War, 1873–1874; Egyptian War, 1882; South African War, 1899–1900; China War, 1900; World War I, 1914–1918
- Awards: 1st Baronet of Witley in the County of Surrey (1913); Knight Commander of the Order of the Bath (1910); Knight Commander of the Royal Victorian Order (1906); Commander of the Royal Victorian Order (1902); Order of the Medjidieh of the Third Class (Turkey) (1890)

Admiral Sir Percy Moreton Scott, 1st Baronet, KCB, KCVO (10 July 1853 – 18 October 1924) was a British Royal Navy officer and a pioneer in modern naval gunnery. During his career he proved to be an engineer and problem solver of some considerable foresight, ingenuity and tenacity. He did not, however, endear himself to the Navy establishment for his regular outspoken criticism of the Navy's conservatism and resistance to change and this undoubtedly slowed the acceptance of his most important ideas, notably the introduction of directed firing. In spite of this, his vision proved correct most of the time and he rose to the rank of admiral and amongst other honours was made baronet, a hereditary title.

== Early years ==
Scott was educated at Eastman's Royal Naval Academy, Southsea, and entered the navy as a cadet in 1866, at the age of thirteen, and in 1868 received a post on HMS Forte, a 50-gun frigate. He served in the Third Anglo-Ashanti War and was based at Cape Coast Castle. He was promoted to the rank of lieutenant in 1875.

In 1878 he attended a course at HMS Excellent to qualify as a gunnery lieutenant. It was during this period that, having created a serviceable running track on Whale Island (which had been largely created when dumping the mud spoil from the excavation of the basins which were to form Portsmouth dockyards), he put forward the suggestion that Whale Island should be levelled and drained to allow the construction of a new gunnery establishment to replace the 80-year-old ship which at the time was rotting and needed replacement. The proposal was rejected as ridiculous. Having completed the course, there followed a year's tour of duty as an instructor after which Scott was posted as gunnery lieutenant on HMS Inconstant part of a squadron responsible for training officers and men in the use of masts and sails. In October 1880 the ship set off for a world cruise but having visited South America, was ordered from the Falkland Islands, on the outbreak of the First Boer War to sail to South Africa, arriving in mid-February. They were not involved in the hostilities and by mid-April had sailed once more for Australia.

It was during this cruise Scott devised an electrical indicator system to communicate target ranges from the lookout position on the masthead to the gun deck. Fifteen months later he received a commendation from the Admiralty for his work but ruefully pointed out in his autobiography that on returning to England he discovered his idea had been "... pirated and patented by someone else ... the Admiralty did not supply it to the Service until twenty-five years afterwards."

Returning from Australia via South Africa Scott found himself having to deal with a fire on board when moored in Simon's Bay. From this he learned that the "smoke cap" supplied to wear in smoke-filled environments was of little use and the alternative, wearing a diving suit, was little better because of the weight of the helmet when on dry land. Scott set his ingenuity to the problem and devised a light metal helmet and short coat with waist belt and wrist bands to prevent smoke contaminating the wearer's breathing air which was piped in. This proved effective and once more Scott wrote to the Admiralty with his design and once more it was rejected (on the basis that the Loeb smoke-cap was satisfactory). It was thirty years later that the Admiralty changed their minds.

On their journey home the Inconstant was ordered from Gibraltar to Alexandria. Scott was present at the 1882 British naval bombardment of Egyptian forts at Alexandria, and while witnessing how inaccurate the British gunners were, began to form his own ideas on the nature of naval gunfire. He was commended once more for his ingenious work in dismounting enemy heavy guns from the captured forts for use by the army.

In 1883 Scott was posted to the gunnery school at HMS Cambridge. After six months he was transferred to HMS Excellent once more. Here he once more took up his idea of creating the gunnery school on Whale Island. In spite of the unpromising prospects, he created a detailed plan which he submitted to the commander of Excellent Captain John Fisher. After careful scrutiny Fisher put the plan forward to the Admiralty with his recommendation. The plan was accepted and work started immediately.

In 1886 Scott was promoted to the rank of commander and joined HMS Edinburgh as second in command. Scott attempted to implement some of his ideas for gunnery improvement by holding regular firing practices, but was forced to direct most of his crew's energies towards the traditional naval task of cleaning the ship:

In those days it was customary for a Commander to spend half his pay, or more, in buying paint to adorn H.M. ships, and it was the only road to promotion. A ship had to look pretty; prettiness was necessary to promotion, and as the Admiralty did not supply sufficient paint or cleaning material for keeping the ship up to the required standard, the officers had to find the money for buying the necessary housemaiding material.

During Edinburgh's time with the Mediterranean Fleet, Scott noted the difficulties experienced by the flagship in making signals to the fleet (rather than to individual ships). He developed an arrangement with a masthead light which could be seen in all directions and which because of its height was not lost in the confusion of the other lights within the flagship's superstructure. The flagship adopted the design but the Admiralty then introduced a changed design for general issue which failed to work. Only after several years of "trial and waste of money" was Scott's original design adopted.

In early 1890 Scott left Edinburgh to return to HMS Excellent, the gunnery school. He found that construction was still in progress and his original plans had been "much departed from" and that things were "generally in rather a confused state". Scott proceeded to sort things out with his characteristic energy but there still remained the problem that little provision had been made to deal with road-making, draining and levelling. He judged that taking this issue up with the Admiralty would result in no early resolution so came up with a novel solution: he raised money by subscription to construct a cricket pitch in the centre of Whale Island, well drained and professionally constructed. After its completion, their Lordships, the Commissioners of the Admiralty, were making a visit and were shown the new pitch. However, to gain access they had to make their way across the approaches to the pitch ankle-deep in mud. Orders were promptly issued at the highest level for the island to be levelled and drained!

During his term at Excellent Scott was appointed to sit on a three-man committee to revise and standardise the regulations respecting the navy's uniforms. At the time navy officers "were wearing practically what they liked" and the Prince of Wales had called attention to this.

In his three years at Excellent Scott had made great strides in "perfecting Whale Island as a barracks" but "its efficiency as a School of Gunnery advanced but slowly". This was because although there seemed to be plenty of money for bricks and mortar, little was forthcoming for the necessary guns, ammunition and equipment for instruction.

== Ideas into practice ==
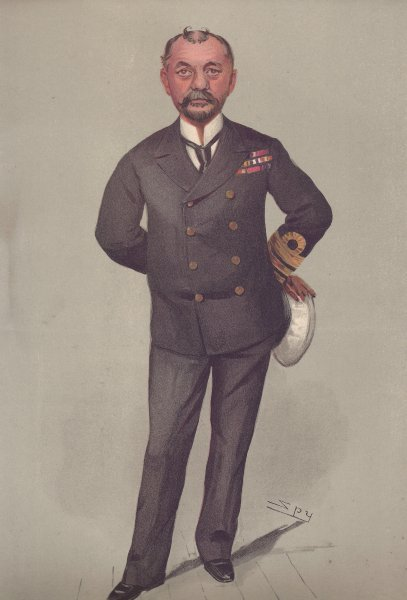
Scott caricatured by Spy in Vanity Fair, 1903

Promoted to the rank of captain in January 1893, Scott served on the Navy's Ordnance Committee until 1896.

Scott was appointed captain of HMS Scylla on 28 May 1896. The Scylla was a 3400-ton cruiser in the British Mediterranean Fleet. During his time on the Scylla, Scott noted that night time signalling between ships in the fleet was slow and inaccurate. He addressed this in two ways: he devised training aids and put his signallers under instruction and he devised a new more effective flashing lamp. The new efficiency of his ship's signalling was quickly noticed by the Commander-in-Chief resulting in Scott's programme being adopted by the whole Mediterranean fleet. A report by the fleet's flag lieutenant to the Admiralty was submitted in 1899 setting out the inadequacies of the old system and promoting Scott's ideas. It was however, many years before they were adopted.

In 1897 and 1898 the Scylla achieved "very poor results" in its annual prize firing; and achieved 8% hits with her 6" guns and 13% with her 4.7" guns in the 1897 prize firing; average for the Mediterranean Fleet in 1897 was 24% for 6" and 35% for 4.7" guns. In the 1898 prize firing, Scylla achieved second place in the Mediterranean Fleet. Later in 1898, the Scylla was detached to make an independent cruise in the Eastern Mediterranean; and the Commander-in-Chief, Sir John Hopkins, gave Scott permission to make changes to gunnery training in the Scylla to improve the ship's shooting. Most gunnery training used a sub-calibre gun. Scott's crew initially tried giving a gun a telescopic sight, but this did not improve accuracy with sub-calibre firing. His crew then tested the 1" calibre sub-calibre gun they were using and found that its dispersion was unexpectedly high, even when mounted on a rigid platform on land. So they replaced it with a .303 Lee–Metford rifle as their sub-calibre gun. This greatly improved accuracy with the telescopic sight. Experimentation showed that it was difficult for the man using the telescopic sight to adjust the sight whilst watching the target through the telescope; so Scott added an extra man to each gun crew, "whose duty was to raise or lower the sight according to the orders of the pointer. He was called the 'sight-setter'." At the time, the Admiralty expressed disapproval of this increase in the size of the gun crew, but four years later the sight-setter became a standard part of every gun crew. Since it was difficult for the gunner to see hits made by .303 ammunition on the standard Admiralty towing target, Scott's crew built a new towing target, which was adopted by the Admiralty as their standard towing target six years later. One day, the rolling of the ship meant that only one of the gunners were able to hit the target. Scott watched this man very closely, and had a training tool (the "dotter") built to teach gun teams to hit the target when the ship was rolling. on 2 September 1898, Scott wrote to Hopkins thanking him for his help in improving the gunnery of the Scylla. The Scylla's next prize firing was on 26 May 1899; she made 45% with her 6" guns and 80% hits with her 4.7" guns. (Note: Though the Scylla getting 80% hits with her 4.7" guns in the 1899 prize-firing was a record, the Empress of India made 46.9% hits with her 6" guns, which was better than the Scylla's 45% hits with 6" guns.) This gave the Scylla the best score in heavy-gun prize firing that had been achieved so far in the Royal Navy. The Scylla returned to England in June 1899 and paid off.

Scott had a few months leave on half-pay, and was then given command of the much larger cruiser HMS Terrible (14,400 tons) which was ordered to China. Expecting hostilities to break out in South Africa, Scott managed to persuade the Admiralty to allow him to make passage via the Cape of Good Hope rather than the originally planned Suez Canal route. Terrible arrived at the Cape in October 1899 to find war imminent. With no threat from the sea, Scott set about determining how he might adapt the navy's guns by mounting them on wheels for use on land to support the army, which lacked long-range artillery and found that its ordinary guns were out-ranged by the Boer artillery. The mountings looked somewhat amateurish, causing the authorities to regard them with considerable suspicion. However, they proved very effective and the role of two of his 4.7-inch guns at the Siege of Ladysmith became a matter of some notoriety.

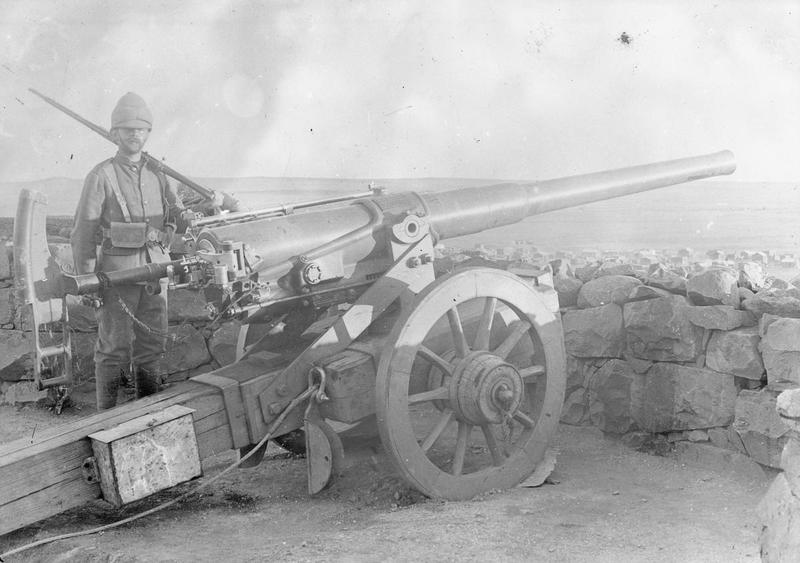
A naval gun on a "Percy Scott" improvised gun carriage during the Second Boer War.

At the end of October Scott was appointed Military Commandant of Durban and arrived in Terrible to take up his appointment on 6 November. By the afternoon of 8 November all approaches to the city were covered by gun batteries and an armoured train ready to respond to eventualities. Scott was able to signal the Governor of Natal that the city was safe. While busy in his role as Military Commandant and supplying adapted naval guns to the army, Scott also devised a system for communicating with the besieged Ladysmith using a ship's searchlight mounted on a truck, a salvaged dynamo and a venetian blind arrangement to allow messages to be flashed. This proved most successful. He also turned two steamers into hospital ships. Scott's time in South Africa came to an end at the end of March 1900, almost coinciding with the relief of Ladysmith, and Scott was appointed a Companion of the Order of the Bath (CB) on 13 March 1900, in recognition of services in South Africa. The Terrible proceeded on its way to China.

In China Terrible and its crew became involved in the Boxer Rebellion and once more Scott found himself dismounting his guns to provide assistance to land forces and making a significant contribution to the Battle of Tientsin. After hostilities ceased Scott returned to working up his ship's gunnery capabilities, devising novel training aids and trying to better the 80% score which had been achieved in the Scylla. After target practice Scott was in the habit of posting his comments on the ship's notice board. On one occasion he had praised nine out of the twelve gun crews but had described the other three as most discreditable. This was somehow picked up by the Press which pointed out that the three gun crews which had been criticised had achieved scores of 41%, a score achieved by no other crew in the Navy using the same guns, the average score being 28%. In the Navy's 1901 prize firing Terrible achieved a score of 80%, the best of any ship in the Navy. Consequent to this the captain of HMS Barfleur adopted the Terrible training regime and saw a doubling in its score within a month.

During the spring of 1902 Terrible spent several months at Hong Kong, providing relief and condensed water for the dockyard, amid an outbreak of cholera in the city leading to a water famine. In July 1902 Scott received orders to return with his ship to Britain and after making passage via the Suez Canal returned to Portsmouth in September. After arrival, Captain Scott and the officers and men of the ship were hosted to a public dinner in Portsmouth, and Scott was allowed to present the South Africa and China medals to 740 officers and men of the Terrible before leaving the ship for a new command. In early October he visited Balmoral Castle where King Edward VII invested him with his CB, and appointed him a Commander of the Royal Victorian Order (CVO).

With the intervention of Jackie Fisher, Scott was in April 1903 posted to HMS Excellent, the naval gunnery school at Whale Island, Hampshire. The Excellent served as a training ground, especially for gunnery, and Scott was able to continue to refine his ideas. This included ways to increase artillery accuracy as well as improve the speed of loading the guns. In 1903 Scott was appointed aide de camp to the king, a largely honorary role which he held until promotion to flag rank in 1905.

== Gunnery developments ==
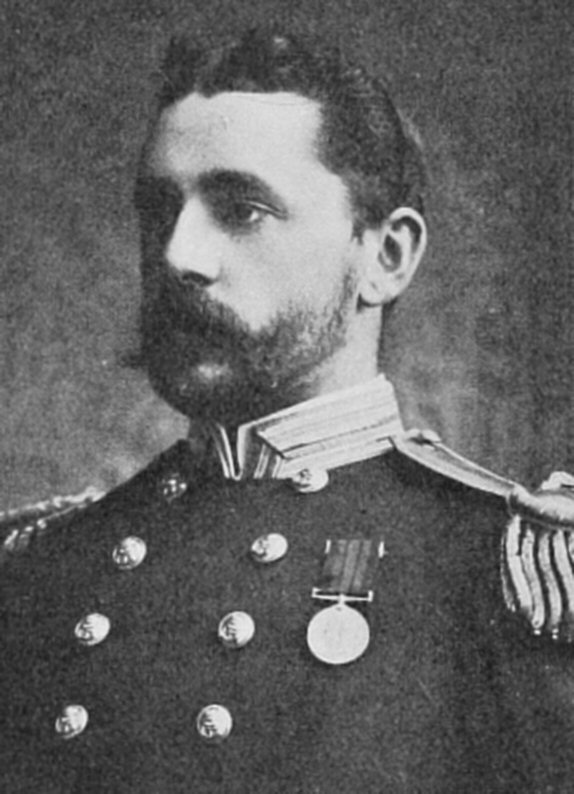
Captain Percy Scott

Until the end of the nineteenth century, the accepted range at which warships would open fire on an enemy was 2,000 yards. The development of the torpedo as a practical weapon forced a change in this policy, and it became necessary to engage an enemy at ranges outside torpedo range. This in turn meant that the old system whereby a gunlayer in each turret pointed and fired the turret guns independently could no longer be expected to achieve a significant hit rate on an opposing ship. Scott was instrumental in encouraging the development and installation, initially in dreadnought battleships and battlecruisers, of director firing, a system whereby the guns were all pointed, elevated and fired from a single point, usually at the top of the foremast. By firing all the guns simultaneously it was possible to observe the simultaneous splashes produced and correct the aim visually. This system was only practical in ships having a uniform calibre main armament, which dreadnought battleships and battlecruisers had, but conferred a significant advantage in accuracy particularly in bad weather and heavy seas when visibility was poor.

Before the First World War, Captain Frederic Dreyer developed a system which enabled a target ship's range and bearing to be plotted continuously so that the proper range and deflection to hit it could then be calculated. These data were then relayed to the director, allowing a further improvement to accuracy. In 1903 Dreyer had described a device, later developed by Vickers and Scott as the Vickers range clock, that automatically kept track of the changing range to an enemy ship.

During a visit in 1905 to Kiel, the German fleet's home port, Scott noted the advances that had been made by the Germans in gunnery direction. He devised and presented to the Admiralty an advanced form of director firing which they patented for the nation and then proceeded to boycott.

== Later career ==
Scott was promoted to rear-admiral in 1905 and was appointed inspector of target practice, a role created for him by his mentor Jackie Fisher. In 1907 Scott took command of the 1st Cruiser squadron of the Channel Fleet, under the command of Lord Charles Beresford. Because of a forthcoming fleet inspection by Kaiser Wilhelm II, Beresford signalled all ships to abandon any exercises they were currently engaged in, to enable them to be painted and tidied. Scott's ships were in the middle of a gunnery exercise; he lost his temper and sent an insubordinate signal which resulted in a public reprimand. The Kaiser arrived two hours late and did not have time to inspect the fleet.

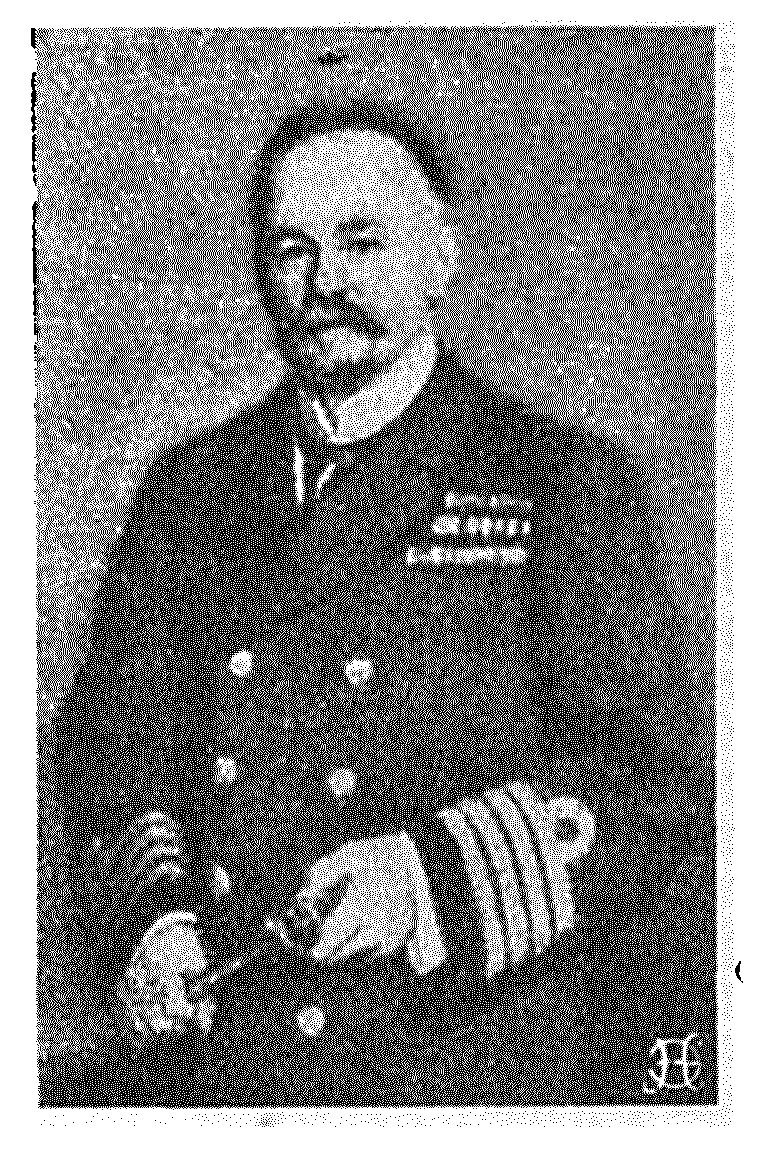
Percy Scott

In July 1908 came what is referred to as the second signalling incident. Beresford signalled to the columns of the third division of the fleet, which were under Scott's command, to turn inwards together. As the two columns were at the time steaming on a parallel course with a separation of only 1,200 yards (six cables distance), this would have caused the leading ships, HMS Good Hope and HMS Argyll to collide. Scott ordered the captain of the Good Hope to disobey the order, thus avoiding a repetition of the Victoria – Camperdown disaster. Beresford attempted to have Scott court-martialled, but the Admiralty refused. Scott was moved to a command outside Beresford's orbit and promoted to vice-admiral in December 1908. His new assignment involved commanding a squadron of four ships on a flag-waving cruise to South Africa departing in September 1908. This allowed him to fly his flag until February 1909, when he hauled it down and came ashore. During his final sea duty he had developed a gunnery routine based on simultaneous parallel firing of his ship's main armament centrally directed using the director-firing apparatus he had developed.

According to his memoirs, when he came ashore the Admiralty indicated he would receive no further sea postings and that he would render greater service to his country by continuing his work on director-firing than going to sea. In his autobiography he made the comment, "this assurance appealed to my sense of humour, for I well knew that the Admiralty, as a body, were moving heaven and earth to prevent director firing being adopted." This was borne out by the fact that shortly after his departure from the Good Hope the director firing system Scott had installed was stripped out. Nevertheless, he set to in order to try to change this. He gained support from Sir John Jellicoe, at that time serving as a member of the Board of Admiralty, who authorised that one ship, HMS Neptune, should be fitted with the director system and work started in December 1910. Successful firing trials were conducted in March 1911 on the basis of which Jellicoe, by that time Vice-Admiral Commanding the Atlantic Fleet, proposed that all ships should be so equipped. However, opposition came from the Admiralty and the Commander-in-Chief of the Home Fleet (who ironically flew his flag on HMS Neptune, the only ship in the Navy fitted with the apparatus). In late 1911 orders were given for a second ship, HMS Thunderer, to be fitted out.

When Winston Churchill became First Lord of the Admiralty he directed that a head-to-head trial should be arranged between Thunderer and another similar ship not fitted with the director apparatus. After delays and obfuscation the trials eventually took place in November 1912. The result was that at a range of 9,000 yards Thunderer was found to have scored six times as many hits as HMS Orion. At the time, Orion was considered to be the best shooting ship in the navy. Subsequently, Churchill ordered that 29 Dreadnought ships be fitted with director-firing. However, on the outbreak of war in August 1914 work ceased after only eight ships had been completed. Work resumed three months later when Scott returned to take up a post in the Admiralty to expedite the programme.

The dragging of feet by the Admiralty, although partly arising from many senior admirals' conservatism, was also heavily influenced by Scott's unpopularity. Since 1905 he had outspokenly challenged the Navy's orthodoxy in gunnery, culminating in late 1911 in a letter to the Admiralty which in effect accused them of endangering the nation. He had also involved himself from 1907 in further controversy by criticising the Admiralty's decision to authorise the construction of new ships with their main mast behind the foremost funnel, thus compromising the effectiveness of the gunfire observation position on the main mast. Although his view was later vindicated and the error put right at considerable expense, he was "...much disliked for his pains" when he pointed out "...the ships would be of no use for fighting purposes, unless they went stern first into action." Furthermore, his habit of appealing direct to the First Lord, the Admiralty's political master, made him no friends. Scott himself put their Lordships' resistance down to "...professional jealousy". In spite of this he was promoted to full admiral and created a baronet in 1913.

== Retirement ==
Scott retired from the navy in 1913 to make way for the promotion of younger men. However he continued to be employed by the Navy in connection with his director-firing work. He also directed his attention to the issue of submarines, against which there was no effective defence at the time. He was aware that the Germans were constructing a large fleet of submarines, the introduction of which he believed "...revolutionised naval warfare and put into the hands of the Germans a weapon of far more use to them than their fleet of battleships." He set about trying to persuade the Admiralty of the need for more aeroplanes to spot submarines and destroyers to attack them. Unable to convince the Admiralty that submarines were anything more than a toy, Scott once again went direct to the politicians to secure money in the naval budget to fund submarine defences. In an angry response the Admiralty dispensed with Scott's services in director firing at the end of 1913, at which point only two ships had been fitted with the new equipment and with design work still to be commenced for a number of ship classes.

In June 1914, following the publishing of the 1914–1915 Naval Estimates, Scott had a letter published in the London Times criticising the lack of provision for submarines and aircraft. He argued that submarines represented a potent threat to the fleet and that no fleet could hide from the eye of the aeroplane: "probably if we went to war, we should at once lock our battleships up in a safe". For this he received an avalanche of critical denials.

== World War I ==
When war broke out, at the request of Field-Marshal Earl Roberts, Scott provided proposals for the use of 6-inch naval guns mounted for mobile use on land as long range artillery. Neither the War Office nor Admiralty appreciated the value of such long range weapons and it was not until mid-1915, when under pressure on the Western Front from long range German guns, they urgently called Scott to put the proposals into effect.

In November 1914 Scott was called into the Admiralty by Winston Churchill and Lord Fisher, returned once more as First Sea Lord, to be told he was to be employed as an advisor in connection with the gunnery efficiency of the fleet. His first job, however, was to organise the conversion of sixteen merchant vessels into a squadron of dummy warships which he effected with the help of the Harland and Wolff shipyard in Belfast.

Once more Scott turned his attention to the submarine menace. He proposed that rams should be put on torpedo boats, destroyers and trawlers, and he submitted a design for a bomb which could be used to attack submarines on or near the surface. These measures were rapidly implemented. In late October 1914 Captain P. H. Colomb proposed a depth charge actuated by a hydrostatic pressure valve and in the same month Rear-Admiral Sir Charles Madden suggested adapting howitzers to lob depth charges in the water. In November Scott proposed a simple depth charge deliverable from the air. Scott was however frustrated by the Admiralty's exhaustive development process and instead of having a basic howitzer depth charge combination in late 1914, the weapon did not become available until 1916.

Much of Scott's time was employed cutting through red tape and getting the Grand Fleet fitted with director-firing. However, in May 1915 Fisher resigned and Scott once more found himself with little influence. Once more the momentum slowed. By the time of the Battle of Jutland in 1916 only six ships were fully fitted (for primary and secondary armament) and no cruisers at all were equipped. Scott lost his eldest son, a midshipman in one of the cruisers sunk in the battle.

In January 1915 Churchill offered Scott command of the fleet for the Gallipoli Campaign. He decided that the ships of the Mediterranean Fleet could not possibly perform the tasks required of them and so he refused the appointment.

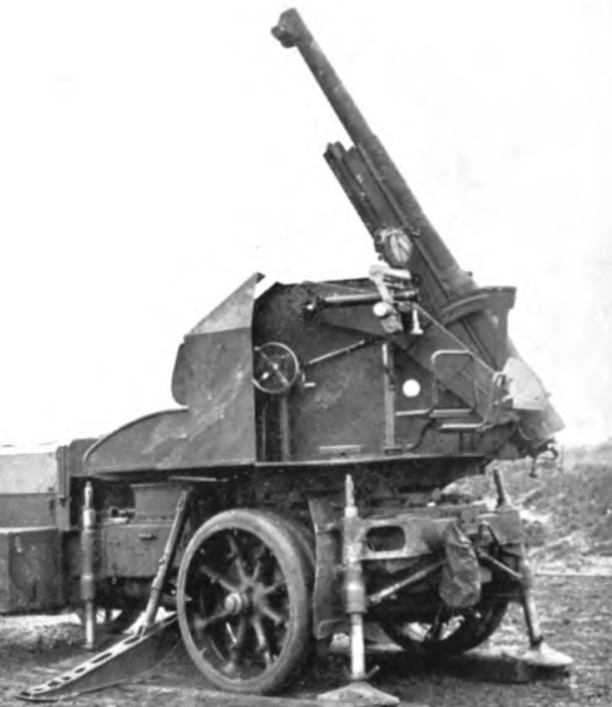
One of the French 75 mm mobile anti-aircraft guns obtained for the defence of London in 1915.

In September 1915, following a Zeppelin raid on London, the First Lord, Arthur Balfour ordered Scott to establish the London Air Defence Area to defend London from the increasing threat of air attack. Little thought had been given to the possibility of air attack and anti-air measures had been given no priority. Scott's first priority was to devise a high-explosive shell, easy to manufacture and with a suitable fuse. With the help of the Navy's Anti-Aircraft department this was quickly achieved but then came the problem of getting the proposals through the Admiralty's administrative process and into production. To avoid this Scott took the plans to France where he directly commissioned a car manufacturer, which started production quickly and efficiently.

The second priority was to create a cadre of flyers capable of flying at night and intercepting Zeppelins and to devise ammunition for aeroplanes' guns suitable for attacking Zeppelins. Although workable proposals had been submitted in 1914, these had been rejected and once again in 1915 after successful trials. Fortunately for Britain the ammunition and flyers were available by 1916 when the Germans launched their air offensive.

Scott worked tirelessly to get guns from the Navy and Army for conversion into anti-aircraft guns. By pulling strings with Jellicoe and Kitchener he managed to build his numbers from twelve to 118. On his own authority, Scott dispatched Lieutenant-Commander Toby Rawlinson to Paris, who through his personal contacts managed to secure from the French two lorry-mounted examples of the highly effective 75mm gun; Rawlinson, a former racing driver, returned to London with the guns within 72 hours, before the Admiralty had actually written the order for them. Using the French design as a guide and cutting red tape by pulling in help from a wide range of sources Scott had by late November assembled an Anti-Aircraft Corps of 152 guns manned by volunteers from a wide range of professions. In February 1916 responsibility for the air defence of London was transferred from the Admiralty to the War Office. After some confusion it was agreed that Scott's association with the Corps should end and he took a position as advisor to Field-Marshal John French on air defence questions.

For the rest of the war Scott continued to suggest improvements on a wide range of subjects: his intervention with General Sir Henry Rawlinson led to changes being made to the mountings on the army's 9.2inch guns resulting in an increase in range from 13,000 to 17,000 yards while he also made important suggestions as to the handling of searchlights on the navy's ships to improve their ability to fight in the dark.

By 1918, with his supporter Jellicoe gone from the Admiralty, Scott was underemployed: in his opinion he was being given too little information to provide good advice on gunnery while the advice he gave was ignored. He therefore wrote to the Admiralty and "...pointed out to the authorities that as they would not give me anything to do I would do what I could without robbing the country of £1200 a year." (the salary he was being paid).

== Post-war activities ==
In 1919 Scott began a remorseless but ultimately unsuccessful campaign in The Times against the battleship, saying I regarded the surface battleship as dead before the War, and I think her more dead now if that is possible. His prescient reasoning, set out in his autobiography, was that although a battleship could carry about 100,000 pounds (45,000 kg) of high explosive which it could project to a range of about 15 miles (24 km) it was vulnerable to aircraft carrying bombs and torpedoes as well as submarines. For the same cost as a battleship, several "aeroplane-carrying" ships could be built with aeroplanes capable of projecting 100,000 lbs of high explosive out to a range of 150 miles (240 km).

== Commercial success and controversy ==
Scott received payments from the Admiralty for his ideas totalling £10,000 equivalent to over £250,000 in 2005's money. More significantly, officers of the day were allowed to commercialize their inventions, and Scott landed a royalties agreement with Vickers leading to aggregate payments to him of some £200,000 equivalent to over £5,000,000 in 2005's money. Financial independence allowed Scott to indulge his intellectual arrogance and judgemental nature, which, when combined with his flair for self-publicity, formed the basis of his fractious relationship with Navy authorities. However, Jackie Fisher, creator of the radical Dreadnought concept and a dominant influence on naval reform in the years leading up to the First World War, recognized Scott's merits, kept his career on track and was instrumental in promoting and introducing many of his ideas.

== Lawn mower ==
In 1920, Scott invented a motor driven lawn mower, forecasting that the day would come "when gardeners will refuse to work for a man who does not possess an automatic mower."

== Personal life and death ==
Scott was first married in 1893 to Teresa Roma Dixon-Hartland. Three children resulted but the marriage ended in divorce in 1911 as a result of his wife's adultery. In 1914 Scott remarried to divorcee Fanny Vaughan Johnston Welman (née Dinnis) but this relationship endured only briefly. Scott died of a heart attack in 1924 leaving an estate of nearly £130,000 (about £4,000,000 at 2005 value) plus two houses. His eldest son, Midshipman John Scott, was killed in action in the Battle of Jutland in 1916. His second son, Douglas, succeeded to his title.

Scott's younger brother Malcolm Scott was a popular comic entertainer in theatres and on radio.

== Notes ==
Baronetage of the United Kingdom
New creation	Baronet (of Witley); 1913–1924	Succeeded by Douglas Scott
