= James Crowther =

James Gerald Crowther (26 September 1899, Halifax – 30 March 1983) was one of the founders of science journalism. He was appointed the scientific correspondent of The Manchester Guardian in 1928.

== Life and writings ==
James was the second child of James Crowther, the principal of Halifax Technical School, and his wife, Alice, (née Ainscow), a music teacher.

Crowther attended Bradford Grammar School, where he met Ralph Fox who introduced him to Marxism. He also developed a sufficient interest in mathematics to gain a scholarship to study mathematics and physics at Trinity College, Cambridge. However his arrival there was delayed by the war, as he spent some time with Archibald Hill, applying a scientific approach to anti-aircraft gunnery. During the time he spent with the Anti-Aircraft Experimental Section of the Munitions Inventions Department he gained experience of scientific research.

He came to know A. L. Rowse during a short stint while away from Trinity. He was teaching at Rowse's school 'by way of convalescing' after a collapse brought about by the strains of war work (A Cornish Childhood, 1998, p. 210).

On 7 March 1923 Albert Inkpin enrolled Crowther in the Communist Party of Great Britain.

In 1924 he married Dora Amy Royle de Bude and then started work for Oxford University Press as a travelling salesman selling technical books. He was thus able to support Dora and her six-year-old daughter.

He was appointed a commissioning editor for Oxford University Press by Humphrey Sumner Milford. In 1934 he married Franziscka Zarniko who he met in the USSR whilst visiting the Ukrainian Institute of Physics and Technology (UPTI) in 1932. Franziscka, who had ambitions to become a film maker was the German sister of Barbara Ruhemann, a physicist at UPTI, married to Martin Ruhemann. A third sister Jutte had married Kurt Mendelssohn.

Crowther remained in correspondence with the Russian physicist Boris Hessen following his visit to London as part of the Soviet delegation to the Second International Congress of the History of Science. This continued until Hessen's execution during the great purge during 1936.

On retirement he moved to Flamborough Head, Yorkshire. He died in Driffield on 30 March 1983.

== Works ==
- Science for You (London: Routledge, 1928)
- Short Stories in Science (London: Routledge, 1929; Science for You series)
- An Outline of the Universe, (London: Kegan Paul, Trench, Trubner, 1931; New York: Dodd Mead, 1931)
- Science in Soviet Russia (1930), reprinted (1936)
- The ABC of Chemistry (London: Kegan Paul, Trench, Trubner & Co., 1932)
- Osiris and the Atom (London: George Routledge & Sons, 1932)
- Industry and Education in Soviet Russia (London: William Heinemann, 1932)
- British Scientists of the Nineteenth Century (London: Kegan Paul, Trench, Trubner, 1935)
- Famous American Men of Science (London: Secker & Warburg, 1937)
- The Social Relations of Science (London and New York: Macmillan, 1941)
- Science at War (London: His Majesty's Stationery Office, 1948). Joint author: Richard Whiddington.
- Science in Liberated Europe (London: Pilot Press, 1949)
- Six Great Inventors (London: Hamish Hamilton, 1954; The "Six Great" series)
- Radioastronomy and Radar (London: Methuen & Co., 1958; Methuen's Outlines series)
- Six Great Astronomers: Tycho Brahe, Kepler, Halley, Herschel, Russell, Eddington (London: Hamish Hamilton, 1961; The "Six Great" series)
- Science in Modern Society (New York: Schocken Books, 1968)
