= List of fellows of the Royal Society elected in 1954 =

This article lists fellows of the Royal Society elected in 1954.

== Fellows ==
- Sir Derek Barton
- Sir Thomas MacFarland Cherry
- Sir Ernest Gordon Cox
- Sir Charles Frank
- Sir Austin Bradford Hill
- Edwin Sherbon Hills
- Christopher Hinton, Baron Hinton of Bankside
- Frederick Ernest King
- Heinrich Gerhard Kuhn
- Hans Werner Lissmann
- Frank Campbell MacIntosh
- Leonard Harrison Matthews
- Joseph Lade Pawsey
- Max Perutz
- Alfred Pippard
- Rosalind Pitt-Rivers
- Reginald Dawson Preston
- John William Sutton Pringle
- Francis John Richards
- Claude Rimington
- Werner Wolfgang Rogosinski
- Frederick Sanger
- Otto Struve
- Henry Thode
- William Alexander Waters
- Carrington Bonsor Williams

== Foreign members ==
1. Karl von Frisch
2. Otto Loewi
3. Manne Siegbahn
