= Malcolm Scott (entertainer) =

English actor

- Scott in costume as a Gibson Girl
- Born: Malcolm Dalkeith Scott; 7 March 1872; Bloomsbury, London, England
- Died: 8 September 1929 (aged 57); Burgess Hill, Sussex, England
- Occupations: Actor, comic entertainer, female impersonator
- Years active: 1890s–1920s

Malcolm Dalkeith Scott (7 March 1872 – 8 September 1929) was an English actor, female impersonator, comic entertainer and broadcaster.

== Biography ==
He was born in Bloomsbury, London, the son of a solicitor, and the younger brother of the naval officer Sir Percy Scott. Contrary to some sources, he was not directly related to Antarctic explorer Robert Falcon Scott. Malcolm Scott was orphaned at the age of 14, and was sent to live with relatives in Canada, where he worked on a farm and a railway. On his return to England in the early 1890s, he found work in theatres and music halls as a singer and actor with several companies, and also worked in theatres in Germany.

By 1902, he determined to become a female impersonator, presenting "a feminine character of a higher tone than the average dame", while always retaining "a masculine face". He was regularly billed as "The Woman Who Knows". He made his debut at the London Pavilion in 1903 replacing the indisposed Dan Leno. He became famous for his comic character studies of women such as Boadicea, Nell Gwyn, Salome, Queen Elizabeth, and a Gibson Girl. On one occasion, in character as Catherine Parr, when Queen Alexandra and the Empress of Russia were in the audience, he commented: "It Is strange that all we queens should be assembled."

He regularly featured in pantomimes and in music halls in London, and toured in South Africa, Australia, and the United States. It was said of his first appearance in New York in 1909: "Nothing funnier.. has been seen in a New York vaudeville theatre. The burlesque is pure artistry, subtle and screamingly funny."

Scott remained popular through the 1910s, and was known for his ready wit and personal generosity. He wrote and starred in a short film, How a Housekeeper Lost Her Character in 1913, and made a second tour of the U.S. in 1916. The following year he appeared in his first revue, The Bing Girls, replacing Wilkie Bard. He continued performing through the 1920s, despite illness, and also regularly featured on BBC radio, becoming "a great broadcasting favourite". In retirement, he kept a sweet shop in Brighton.

He died in 1929, aged 57, in Burgess Hill, Sussex, from cancer.
