= Board of Invention and Research =

Former British expert-level committee

Coordinates: 51°30′26.7″N 0°7′48.1″W

Agency overview
- Formed: 1915
- Dissolved: 1918
- Superseding agency: Scientific Research and Experiment Department
- Jurisdiction: Government of the United Kingdom
- Headquarters: Admiralty Building Whitehall London
- Parent agency: Admiralty

The Board of Invention and Research (BIR) was a British expert-level committee, initiated by the Admiralty of the Royal Navy. Established in 1915, the board was responsible for soliciting expert scientific assistance to solve tactical and technical problems. It was a sister organisation to the Munitions Inventions Department which had been set up in April 1915 and the Air Inventions Committee (AIC), once it became become fully operational in the summer of 1917.

== History ==
The Board first met on 19 July 1915 at the Whitehall Rooms in the Metropole Hotel, and remained based at the Metropole until the board and its scientific facilities were moved to permanent headquarters at Victory House on Cockspur Street.

Chaired by Lord Fisher, former First Sea Lord, the BIR recruited of a number of scientists working in six science and technology divisions, which assessed and evaluated invention proposals from the public, with a view to applying them to naval technology and tactics. During its operation from 1915 to 1918, the board evaluated over 41,000 submissions.

In 1918, the BIR was superseded by the Scientific Research and Experiment Department, which operated until 1946 and was then re-organised into the Royal Naval Scientific Service.

== Timeline ==
- Board of Admiralty, Board of Invention and Research, 1915-1918
- Board of Admiralty, Scientific Research and Experiment Department, 1918-1946
- Board of Admiralty, Royal Naval Scientific Service, 1946-1964
- Ministry of Defence, Department of the Chief Scientist (Navy), 1964-1984
