= Henry Shull Arms =

American-British physicist and engineer (1912–1972)

- Born: March 17, 1912; Stambaugh, Michigan, U.S.
- Died: June 16, 1972 (aged 60); Leicester, England
- Education: University of Idaho (BS, 1936); University of Oxford (PhD, 1939)
- Occupations: Nuclear engineer, physicist
- Known for: Gaseous diffusion (Manhattan Project), Hinkley Point A nuclear power station
- Awards: Rhodes Scholarship (1936)
- Engineering career
- Projects: Manhattan Project, Tube Alloys, Sizewell A nuclear power station

Henry Shull Arms (1912–1972) was an American and later British physicist and engineer. He worked in the British and Allied programmes to make a nuclear weapon and later developed civilian nuclear reactors in the UK.

== Early life and education ==
He was born in Tekoa, Washington, United States. He attended four schools in three different states. As a young man, he enjoyed fishing (which he pursued occasionally in Scotland later in life) and hunting. In his late teens, he worked at the Old National Bank in Spokane. He studied mechanical engineering and physics at the University of Idaho and, aged 24, joined Oxford in 1936 on a Rhodes Scholarship, where he took an honours degree in physics. He worked on low-temperature physics - through the demagnetization of salts - under German and Hungarian Jewish refugees Francis Simon and Nicholas Kurti at the Clarendon Laboratory.

== Academic career ==
On the outbreak of WWII, after working at Clarendon, he helped to remove iron fragments during neurosurgery using magnets. In 1940, his engineering knowledge was called for in the war effort to help Simon - with Kurti - continue with isotope separation and calculate the cost of building a gaseous diffusion plant to separate uranium-235 from the more abundant uranium-239. This was under the auspices of the MAUD Committee. The calculations were followed by the plant's construction. A patent for the separation process (with Rudolf Peierls, Simon and Arms as the applicants) was filed in 1943 (and granted in the US in 1960). He continued atomic research under Simon throughout the war, running a research group at the University of Birmingham for 15 months, and moving from uranium isotope separation to heat transfer in a nuclear reactor. In 1945, he joined John Cockcroft at the National Research Council Canada, experimenting with heat transfer in the Chalk River Laboratories NRX heavy water reactor. The group returned to the UK the following year and began the Atomic Energy Research Establishment at Harwell; Arms was Principal Scientific Officer in charge of the engineering laboratory, developing the first British nuclear reactor and also working at Windscale to produce military plutonium. He became Deputy Chief Engineer of the Capenhurst uranium enrichment plant.

In 1953, he became Chief Development Engineer at the English Electric Company in Rugby, which for him necessitated further on-site education in engineering. Two years later he was also Chief Engineer of the atomic power projects at Whetstone. The company gained the contract to build a 500MW nuclear power station at Hinckley Point, Somerset (which opened in 1966). Arms became a naturalised British citizen in 1955.

He died aged 60, survived by his English-born wife and two children.
