= Kurt Mendelssohn =

British physicist (1906–1980)

Kurt Mendelssohn FRS
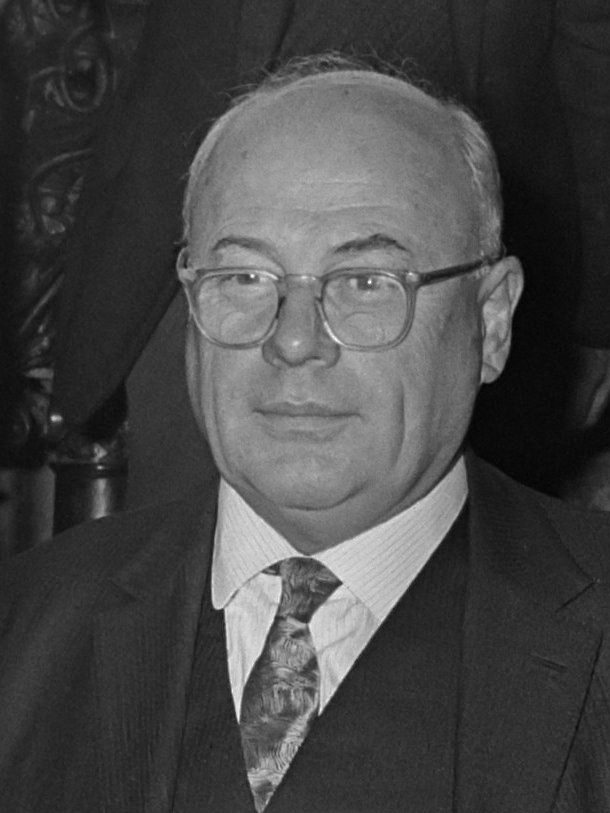
- Born: 7 January 1906; Berlin-Schoeneberg, Germany
- Died: 18 September 1980 (aged 74); Oxford, England
- Citizenship: United Kingdom
- Education: University of Berlin
- Awards: Fellow of the Royal Society (1951); Hughes Medal (1967); Simon Memorial Prize (1968)
- Scientific career
- Fields: Physicist
- Workplaces: University of Oxford
- Doctoral advisor: Franz Eugen Simon
- Other academic advisors: Max Planck; Walther Nernst; Erwin Schrödinger; Albert Einstein
- Doctoral students: Harold Max Rosenberg

Kurt Alfred Georg Mendelssohn (7 January 1906 – 18 September 1980) was a German-born British medical physicist, elected a Fellow of the Royal Society in 1951.

== Family life ==
He was the only child of Ernst Moritz Mendelssohn and Elizabeth Ruprecht. Through his grandfather he was a great-great-grandson of Saul Mendelssohn, the younger brother of philosopher Moses Mendelssohn. This places him amongst the Mendelssohn family. Francis Simon and Heinrich Mendelssohn were his cousins. He married Jutte Zarniko, the sister of Barbara Zarniko, one of Franz Simon's students in 1932. When James Crowther married Franziska Zarniko in 1934, he became a brother-in-law of Mendelssohn.

== Scientific career ==
He received a doctorate in physics from the University of Berlin, having studied under Max Planck, Walther Nernst, Erwin Schrödinger, and Albert Einstein. Frederick Lindemann visited Berlin in 1930 to buy an improved hydrogen liquefier designed by Francis Simon. Mendelssohn was given the role of demonstrating the equipment. During these trials Lindemann tried to recruit Mendelssohn to join him in Oxford University. However, as Mendelssohn had just accepted a job in Breslau, he felt obliged to refuse. He was joining his cousin, Francis Simon, who had appointed Professor of Physical Chemistry at the University of Breslau. Nevertheless, Lindemann contacted him again in 1932 inviting him to the Clarendon Laboratory in Oxford to install a helium liquifier. This he did, and by the time he returned to Breslau in January 1933, he had a grant application to the Rockefeller Foundation to allow him to join the Clarendon Laboratory. In the end both he and Simon ended up receiving funding from Imperial Chemical Industries for research work at Oxford. Whilst the rising tide of German antisemitism provided the context for his reasons for moving, he was to discover that Lindemann's rivalry with Lord Rutherford and the Cavendish Laboratory, based at the University of Cambridge was influential in England.

Leaving Germany at the advent of the Nazi regime in 1933, he went to England. He worked at the University of Oxford from 1933. He was Reader in Physics there, 1955–1973, Emeritus Reader, 1973; Emeritus Professorial Fellow of Wolfson College, Oxford, 1973 (Professorial Fellow, 1971–1973).

His scientific work included low temperature physics, transuranic elements, and medical physics.

He was awarded the Royal Society's Hughes Medal in 1967 and the Simon Memorial Prize in 1968.

== The Pyramid Theory ==
In 1974, he published The Riddle of the Pyramids, in which he sought to explain the origins and functions of the earliest Egyptian pyramids. Though Mendelssohn himself was not an Egyptologist, the book builds on advice from experts like Sir Robert Mond and Walter Emery, as well as his own visits to Egypt and Mexico. His principal thesis was that the pyramid at Meidum had collapsed during construction, a conclusion he arrived at using his knowledge of physics and which was sparked in 1966 by images of the Aberfan disaster, where Mendelssohn saw similarities to the rubble mound surrounding the Meidum pyramid, a primary destination for his travel to Egypt the year before. Working from that conclusion, he further elaborated a theory that pyramid construction in Egypt took on a life of its own during the Third and Fourth Dynasties, more or less independently of the reigns of pharaohs. His theory has not been taken up by the Egyptological community, but the book remains a stimulating and detailed study of the Egyptian pyramids.

Mendelssohn's pyramid theory suggests explanations to a couple of mysteries in pyramid construction:

1. Why in the time of the fourth dynasty, when all of the large Egyptian pyramids were built, there were only three Pharaohs but (with Meidum) five pyramids built.
2. According to Mendelssohn the pyramids were constructed as cenotaphs, not as tombs and did not have to coincide with a Pharaoh's lifetime.
3. Building of the Great Pyramids must have required a large workforce. Considering the state of perfection these pyramids show, a decisive amount of this workforce must have been highly trained professionals. Furthermore, due to the geometrical constraints, the higher a pyramid grows, the fewer people are able to work on it. If the pyramids were built independently of each other and at distinct times, it would have been necessary to assemble and train the workforce for each building and lay them off as the work continued. According to Mendelssohn, as soon as a pyramid had reached about half its final size, work started on the successor to alleviate this problem.
4. The change of the angle seen at the Bent Pyramid can be explained as a reaction to a catastrophic collapse of the Meidum Pyramid, if these monuments were not constructed successively but with an overlap.

== Books by Mendelssohn ==
- The Riddle of the Pyramids. Thames & Hudson, 1974; Sphere Cardinal Edition, 1976.
- The Quest for Absolute Zero. McGraw-Hill, 1966.
- In China Now, 1969.
- The World of Walther Nernst, University of Pittsburgh Press, 1973 (hbk); pbk edition, Macmillan, 1973; pbk edition, Plunkett Lake Press, 2019.
- Science and Western Domination, Thames & Hudson, 1976.
