= Whale Island, Hampshire =

Island in Portsmouth Harbour, England

Coordinates: 50°49′N 1°06′W

Whale Island shown within Hampshire

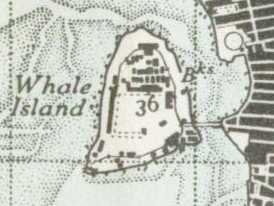
A map of Whale Island from 1945

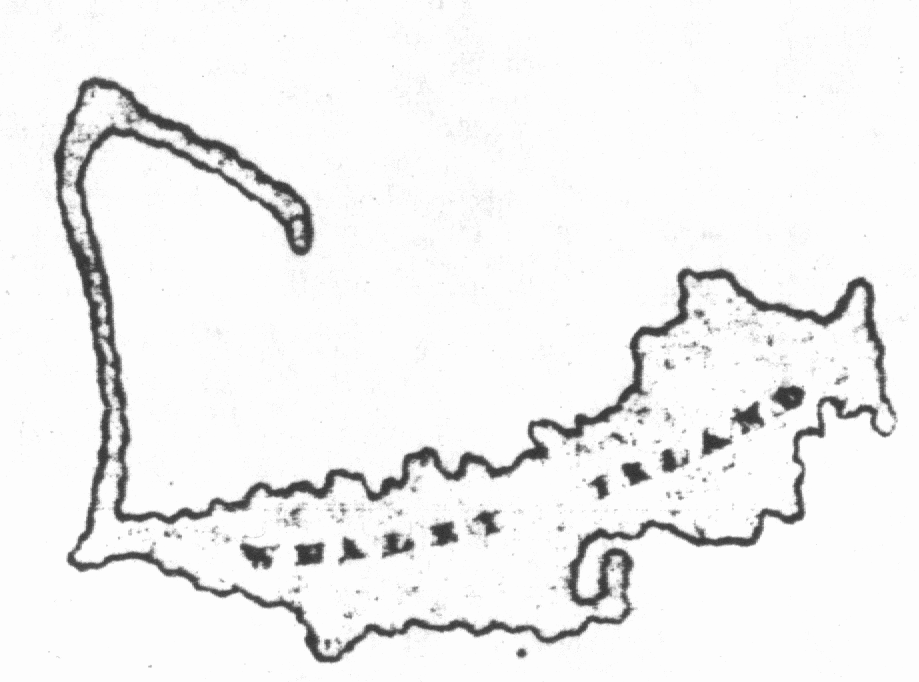
A map of Whale Island from 1833

Whale Island is a small island in Portsmouth Harbour, close by Portsea Island. It is home to HMS Excellent, the oldest shore training establishment within the Royal Navy, and the location of the Navy Command Headquarters. The island is linked to Portsea Island and thence to the mainland by road bridges.

== Early history ==
Ordnance Survey maps of Portsmouth Harbour from 1862 show Whale Island as a narrow strip: its east-to-west dimensions were similar to present times, but north to south it measured only tens of yards. To its northwest was Little Whale Island. Modern Whale Island is predominantly reclaimed land, using the deposits dredged from Portsmouth harbour during the 19th century, increasing the land area by about 125%. It was constructed with the help of the many prisoners taken in the Napoleonic Wars.

== Expansion ==
During 1867 a viaduct was constructed from the north wall of the dockyard to the south-east corner of Big Whale Island which allowed spoil to be moved from dredging the docks (part of the expansion of HMNB Portsmouth), reclaiming the land between Big Whale Island and Little Whale Island, forming the basis of the island as it is today.

The railway which ran on the viaduct was extended around the island to help with the distribution of the spoil and much of the track is still present today, buried under the roads. Manual construction work was mostly undertaken by convicts; a favourable assignment because of the extra food.

By 1885 the island had five rifle ranges, but three of these were soon decommissioned to make room for the Gun Drill Battery and Drill Ground (today this is the Summer Parade Ground).

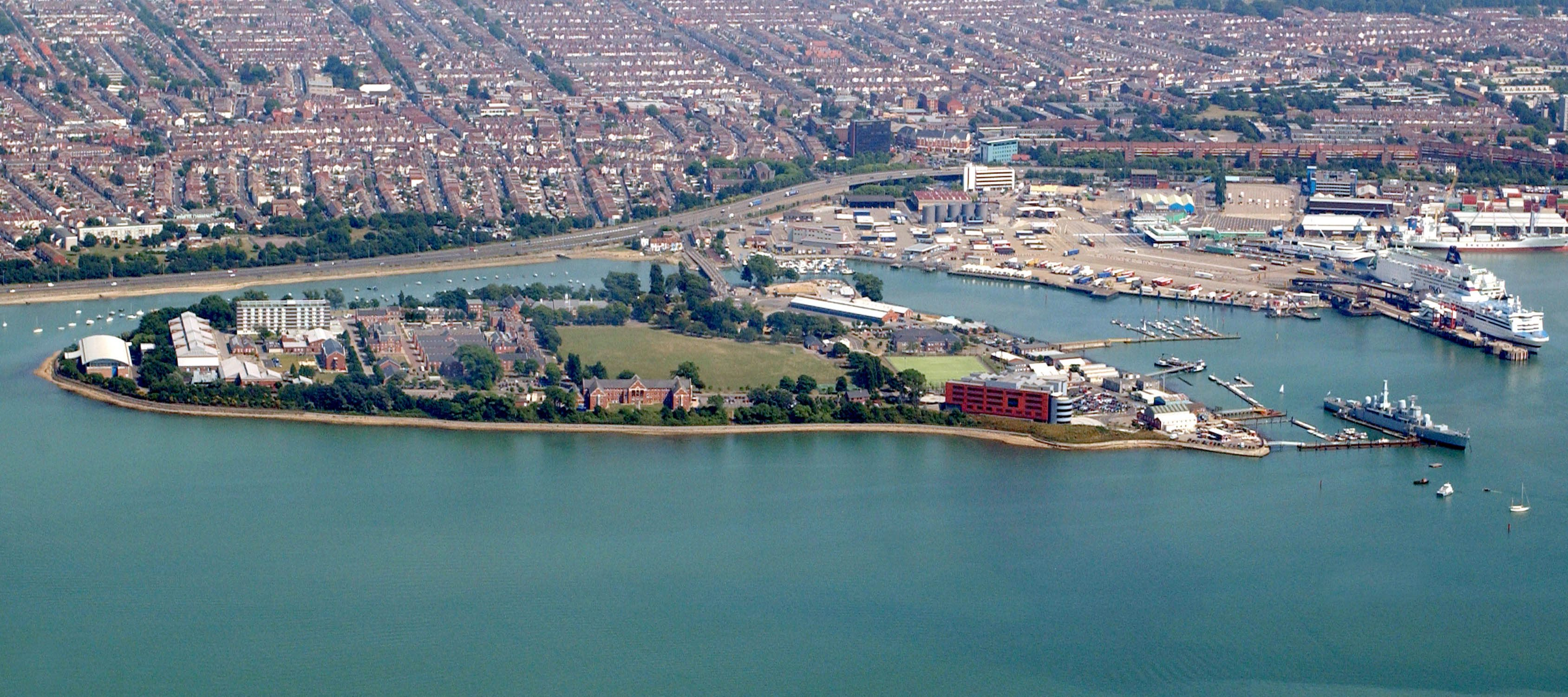
Whale Island seen from the air

Photos on display in Whale Island Quarterdeck (constructed 1888) show that a footbridge to Stamshaw, Portsea Island, was added sometime before 1898 (incorporating a swing-bridge). A small road-bridge now joins the islands at the same point.

From September 1916, the island was home to the Anti-Aircraft Experimental Section.

Before World War II Whale Island was home to a zoo which gave a home to several animals presented to British representatives by friendly countries.

== Ceremony ==
The gun carriage that carries the coffin in British state funerals is maintained on Whale Island.

== Visiting ==
HMS Excellent is an active naval base so it is not open to the general public, but there are occasional open days and prospective visitors are advised to contact the base.
