= Henry Edward Fane Goold-Adams =

British army officer

Sir Henry Edward Fane Goold-Adams
- Born: 16 May 1860; Jamesbrook, County Cork, Ireland
- Died: 15 April 1935 (aged 74); Edinburgh, Scotland
- Burial place: Dean Cemetery
- Relatives: Richard Wallis Goold-Adams (father) Mary Sarah Wrixon-Becher (mother): William Wrixon-Becher (grandfather); Hamilton Goold-Adams (elder brother)
- Military career
- Allegiance: British Army
- Rank: Colonel
- Unit: Royal Artillery

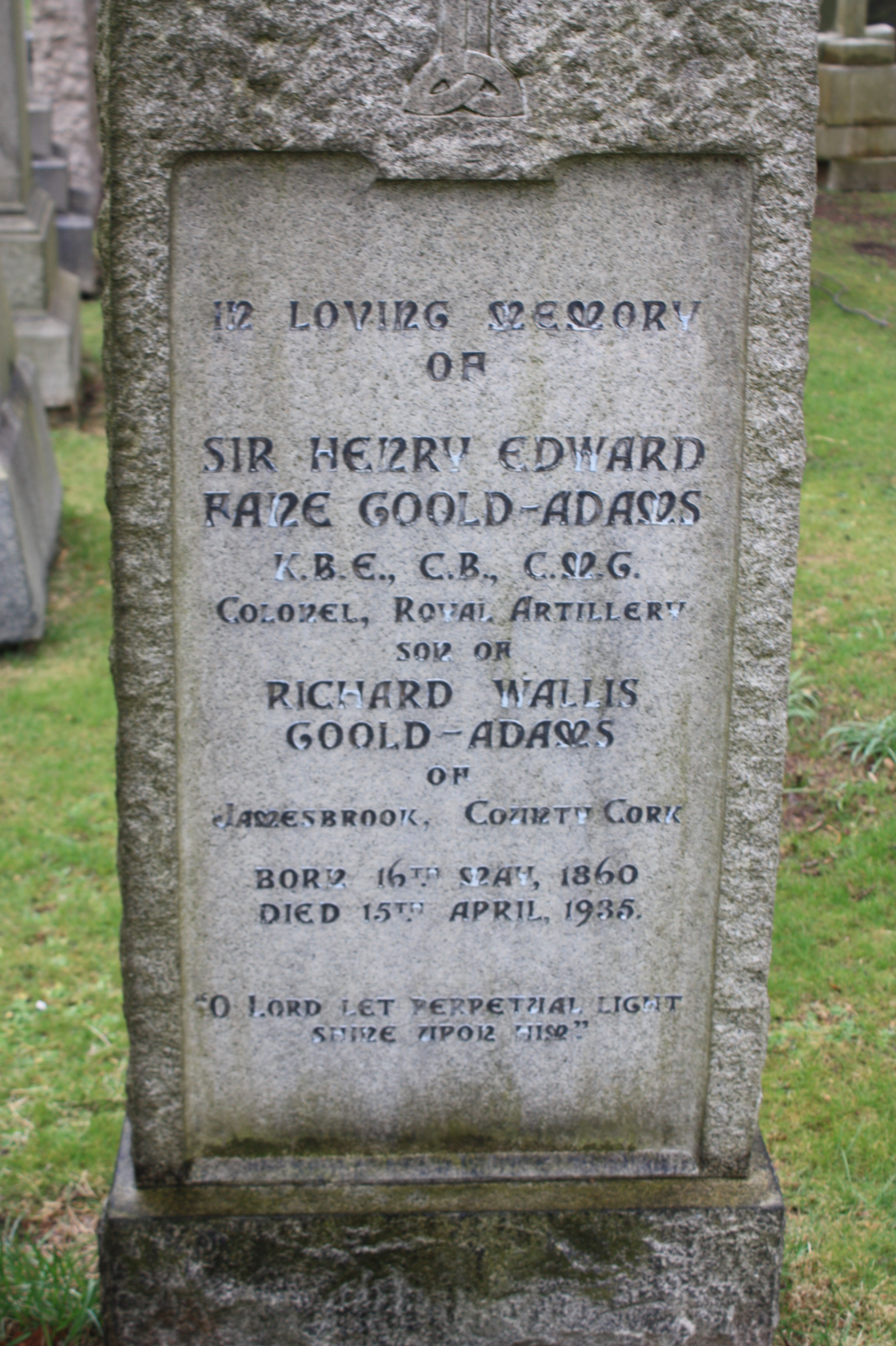
The grave of Sir Henry Edward Fane Goold-Adams, Dean Cemetery

Sir Henry Edward Fane Goold-Adams KBE CB CMG (16 May 1860 – 15 April 1935) was an officer in the British Army who gained the rank of Colonel in the Royal Artillery.

== Life ==
Goold-Adams was born at Jamesbrook Hall in County Cork, Ireland, a younger son of Richard Wallis Goold-Adams and his wife, Mary Sarah Wrixon-Becher, daughter of Sir William Wrixon-Becher. His older brothers included Hamilton Goold-Adams.

Goold-Adams was appointed to the Ordnance Board in 1910.

Goold-Adams climbed Paektu Mountain with Alfred Cavendish in 1891, of which he supplied an account published by Cavendish in 1894. Lloyd George appointed Goold-Adams to the post of Comptroller of the Munitions Inventions Department of the Ministry of Munitions.

Goold-Adams served in China during the Boxer Rebellion in 1901 and was Mentioned in Dispatches.

Goold-Adams was promoted to Lt Colonel in 1906 and in 1908 left the Royal Artillery to join the Territorial Army.

In 1916 he was living on Princes Street in Edinburgh and was corresponding with David Lloyd George (in his capacity as Secretary of State for War) regarding body armour for troops during the First World War.

Goold-Adams died in Edinburgh on 15 April 1935 and is buried in Dean Cemetery in the west of the city.

== Publications ==
- Korea and the Sacred White Mountain (1891)
