= Francis Simon =

German-British chemist

Sir Francis Simon
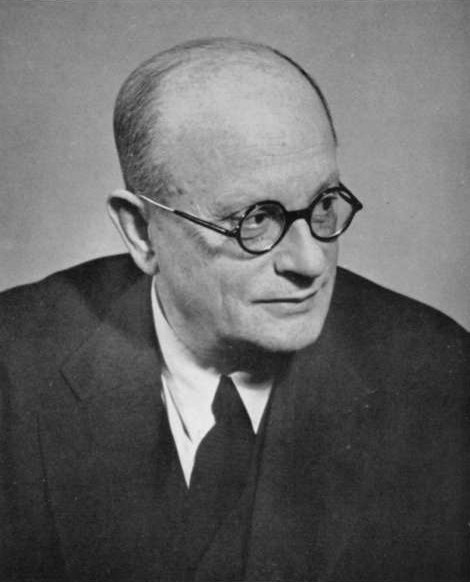
- Born: Franz Eugen Simon; 2 July 1893; Berlin, German Empire
- Died: 31 October 1956 (aged 63); Oxford, UK
- Education: University of Berlin
- Known for: Uranium-235
- Awards: Iron cross (1919); Fellow of the Royal Society; CBE (1946); Rumford Medal (1948); Knighted (1954)
- Scientific career
- Fields: Physicist
- Workplaces: Technische Hochschule of Breslau; University of Oxford
- Doctoral advisor: Walther Nernst
- Doctoral students: Kurt Mendelssohn; Brebis Bleaney; Rostislaw Kaischew

Notes
- He is the first cousin of Kurt Mendelssohn.

Sir Francis Simon CBE (2 July 1893 – 31 October 1956), was a German and later British physical chemist and physicist who devised the gaseous diffusion method, and confirmed its feasibility, of separating the isotope Uranium-235 and thus made a major contribution to the creation of the atomic bomb.

== Early life ==
Born Franz Eugen Simon to a Jewish family in Berlin, Franz was the son of Ernst Simon and Anna Mendelssohn, daughter of the mathematician Philibert Mendelssohn. Two of his cousins, Kurt Mendelssohn and Heinrich Mendelssohn, were also scientists. He won the Iron Cross First Class during World War I. He received his doctoral degree from the University of Berlin, working in the research group of Walther Nernst on low-temperature physics related to the Nernst Heat Theorem, which is one statement of the Third law of thermodynamics, and is sometimes referred to as the Nernst-Simon Heat Theorem. In 1931 he was appointed Professor of Physical Chemistry at the Technische Hochschule of Breslau.

== Emigration ==
The rise of anti-Semitic fascism in Germany in the 1930s caused him and his wife to consider emigrating. Aware of his concerns Frederick Lindemann, 1st Viscount Cherwell met him in Walther Nernst's laboratory during Easter 1933, and invited him to join the Clarendon Laboratory at the University of Oxford. He was also able to offer him a two-year grant research from Imperial Chemical Industries (ICI) of £800. Simon resigned on 1 July 1933, but before he could leave an official demanded that he and his wife surrender their passports. Simon then flung his Iron Cross and other medals onto the table. Their passports were later returned, for reasons unknown. Using the services of a corrupt customs official Simon was able to take his research equipment with him. His wife and children followed him two months later.

Upon arrival in the UK, he started using the Anglicised name "Francis".

== Work in England ==
Using the equipment he had brought with him from Germany he performed pioneering work in low temperature physics. In 1936 he was able to produce the first liquid helium by using magnetic cooling at a laboratory at Bellevue near Paris.

His ICI grant was extended to 1938 which allowed him to turn down an offer of a 10-year contract as Professor of Physical Chemistry at Istanbul. In 1936 despite being supported by Einstein, Nernst, Planck and Rutherford he was unsuccessful in beating Mark Oliphant for the Chair of Physics at Birmingham University. His job security in Oxford improved in 1936 when he was appointed Reader in Thermodynamics and a Student of Christ Church.

Because he was naturalised, until 1940 he was prevented from working on radar. Simon was among the 2,300 names of prominent persons listed on the Nazis' Special Search List, of those who were to be arrested on the invasion of Great Britain and turned over to the Gestapo. Thus, his wife and children took up an offer to spend the war in Canada. Simon remained behind in Oxford. In 1940 in collaboration with Nicholas Kurti and Heinrich Gerhard Kuhn, he was commissioned by the MAUD Committee to investigate the feasibility of separating uranium-235 by gaseous diffusion. He initially adapted his wife's wire kitchen strainer to assist in this work before commissioning a membrane from ICI containing 160,000 holes to the square inch. His resulting conclusions on the separation of uranium isotopes was transferred to the Manhattan Project and was the basis of the process that produced sufficient U235 to make the atomic bomb. He spent the latter part of the Second World War at Los Alamos, returning in 1945 to Oxford to continue his low temperature research.

He became a professor at the University of Oxford and a Student of Christ Church, Oxford in 1945. Upon the retirement of Lord Cherwell he became Dr Lee's Professor of Experimental Philosophy and head of the Clarendon Laboratory in 1956, one month before his death from coronary disease.

== Personal life ==
He married Charlotte Münchhausen in 1922. They had two daughters, Kathrin and Dorothee.

== Honours ==
- Fellow of the Royal Society, 1941
- CBE, 1946
- Rumford Medal of the Royal Society, 1948
- Knighted, 1954

== Bibliography ==
- Medawar, Jean: Pyke, David (2012). Hitler's Gift : The True Story of the Scientists Expelled by the Nazi Regime (Paperback). New York: Arcade Publishing. ISBN 978-1-61145-709-4.
- Clary, David C. (2022) Schrödinger in Oxford World Scientific Publishing ISBN 9789811251009.
