= Munitions Inventions Department =

Defunct British government body

The Munitions Inventions Department (MID) of the British Ministry of Munitions was created during the First World War in 1915. Its administrative structure encompassed university and industrial laboratories, private workshops, and military experimental grounds. The department made use of the experimental facilities of other government agencies, including the National Physical Laboratory at Bushy House and the Department of Scientific and Industrial Research (DSIR). Two sister organisations were formed: The Board of Invention and Research (BIR) which was established in July 1915 to support the Admiralty, and the Air Inventions Committee (AIC), which supported the Air Board once it became become fully operational in the summer of 1917.

== Predecessors ==
The readiness of the British military to tap the inventiveness of the public can be dated back to the eighteenth century. Two War Office committees, the Colonels' Committee and the Field Officers' Committee had been convened in the 1760s to consider proposals submitted by inventors. However it was during the Crimea War that the Ordnance Select Committee was established under the Duke of Newcastle, in his capacity as Secretary of State for War. It superseded the Board of Ordnance, established in the 15th century but deemed inadequate for the circumstances of the time. Originally this committee had had some civilians amongst its fifteen strong membership. However this was dropped when the committee was given a permanent remit. The establishment of the Ordnance Committee in 1881 re-introduced civilian participation, however retaining strong involvement of artillery officers. The foundation of the Advisory Committee for Aeronautics in 1909 by Richard Haldane (later Lord Haldane) helped provide a model for the MID to follow: the committee supervised the aeronautical research of the National Physical Laboratory and provided more general advice pertaining to the scientific problems involved with aerial construction and navigation. The short war illusion that the war would be "over by Christmas" meant that little consideration was given to the development of new means of destruction. The unfolding of the Shell Crisis of 1915 indicated a new approach to innovation in the tools of warfare was needed if the war aims were to be achieved. David Lloyd George, the newly appointed Minister of Munitions pointedly remarked that the War Office exhibited "mental obtuseness in their neglect to keep abreast of modern development in pattern of munitions and machinery for munition production".

== Foundation ==
On 28 July 1915 Lloyd George announced to parliament that Ernest Moir would lead the MID, and on 5 August Moir assumed the role of Comptroller. Over the next week Moir drew up a list of people to serve on the advisory panel of the MID. Moir remained in place into November 1915, when he was persuaded by Lloyd George to go to New York in an informal role organising munition supplies from the United States. Despite Moir arguing for his replacement to be drawn from the civilian experts, Colonel Henry Edward Fane Goold-Adams, a Royal Artillery officer who was part of the Ordnance Board came into post on 19 February 1916.

== Controls and Reports ==
Inventions, ideas and suggestions had to be approved before resources could be allocated to their further assessment or development. The MID’s work was summarised in a series of comprehensive and detailed reports. As the date of the Armistice was approaching the 37th monthly report of the MID dated 1 November 1918 was issued by Sir Henry Norman. Its introduction stated that from its formation in August 1915, the MID had received 47,112 inventions, ideas and suggestions of which 46,104 had been examined, 45,985 considered and just 4,026 reported as worthy of further consideration. The MID was formally dissolved on 1 July 1919. The MID classified reports were specifically intended for and addressed to the Minister of Munitions of War on a monthly basis. The recipient of this 37th report was Winston Churchill who held the post from 17 July 1917.
