= Maralinga Tjarutja =

Aboriginal council area in western South Australia

Coordinates: 26°29′25″S 132°00′28″E

- Local government area
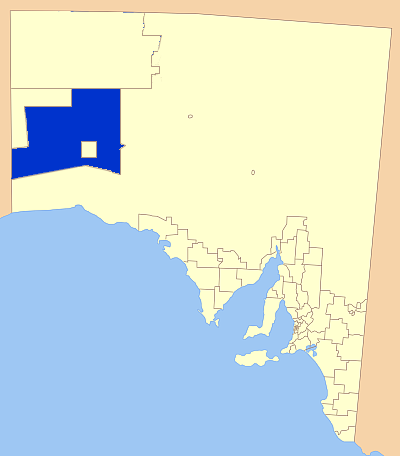
- Location of the Maralinga Tjarutja Council
- Interactive map of Maralinga Tjarutja
- Country: Australia
- State: South Australia
- Region: Eyre Western
- Established: 2006
- Council seat: Ceduna (outside Council area)

Government
  - State electorate: Flinders
  - Federal division: Grey

Area
  - Total: 102,863.6 km^{2} (39,715.9 sq mi)

Population
  - Total: 96 (LGA 2021)
  - Density: 0.001/km^{2} (0.0026/sq mi)
- Website: Maralinga Tjarutja
LGAs around Maralinga Tjarutja
Ngaanyatjarraku, WA	Anangu Pitjantjatjara Yankunytjatjara	Anangu Pitjantjatjara Yankunytjatjara
Laverton Shire, WA	Maralinga Tjarutja	Outback Communities Authority
Laverton Shire, WA	Outback Communities Authority	Outback Communities Authority

The Maralinga Tjarutja, or Maralinga Tjarutja Council, is the corporation representing the traditional Anangu owners of the remote western areas of South Australia known as the Maralinga Tjarutja lands. The council was established by the Maralinga Tjarutja Land Rights Act 1984. The area is one of the two regions of South Australia functioning as an Aboriginal council. For this reason, similarly to Aṉangu Pitjantjatjara Yankunytjatjara, the status of Maralinga Tjartutja as a local government area is sometimes counted separately from the other LGAs in South Australia.

Maralinga Tjarutja is also the name of a 2020 documentary film of the same name.

The Aboriginal Australian people whose historic rights over the area have been officially recognised belong to the southern branch of the Pitjantjatjara people. The land includes a large area of land contaminated by British nuclear testing in the 1950s, for which the inhabitants were eventually compensated in 1991.

There is a community centre at Oak Valley, 840 km (520 mi) NW of Ceduna, and close historical and kinship links with the Yalata 350 km (220 mi) south, and the Pila Nguru centre of Tjuntjuntjara 370 km (230 mi) to their west.

== Languages and peoples ==
The Maralinga Tjarutja people belong to a general Western Desert ecological zone sharing cultural affinities with the Pitjantjatjara, Yankunytjatjara and Ngaanyatjarra to their north and the Pila Nguru of the spinifex plains to their west. They speak dialects of Pitjantjatjara and Yankunytjatjara.

== Ecology and cultural beliefs ==
The term maralinga is not of local origin. It is a term chosen from the Garig or Garik dialect of the now-extinct Northern Territory Ilgar language, signifying "field of thunder/thunder", and was selected to designate the area where atomic bomb testing was to be undertaken by the then Chief Scientist of the Department of Supply, W. A. S. Butement. The land was covered in spinifex grasses and good red soil (parna wiru) furnishing fine camping.

Waterholes (kapi) have a prominent function in their mythology: they are inhabited by spirit children and thought of as birthplaces, and control of them demarcate the various tribal groups. According to Ronald Berndt, one particular water snake, Wanampi, tutelage spirit over native doctors, whose fertility function appears to parallel in some respects that of the Rainbow serpent of Arnhem Land myth, was regarded as the creator of these kapi, and figured prominently in male initiation ceremonies.

== Contact ==
Ooldea or Yuldi/Yutulynga/Yooldool (the place of abundant water) sits on a permanent underground aquifer . The area is thought to have been originally part of Wirangu land, lying on its northern border, though it fell within the boundaries of a Kokatha emu totem group. It served several Aboriginal peoples, furnishing them with a ceremonial site, trade node and meeting place for other groups, from the northeast who would travel several hundred miles to visit kin. Among the peoples who congregated there were tribes from the Kokatha and Ngalea northern groups and Wirangu of south-east and Mirning south-west. By the time Daisy Bates (1919–1935) took up residence there it was thought that earlier groups had disappeared, replaced by an influx of spinifex people from the north. By her time, the Trans-Australian Railway route had just been completed, coinciding with a drought that drew the Western desert peoples to the depot at Ooldea.

Beginning in the 1890s, there was a gradual encroachment by pastoralists up to the southern periphery of the Nullarbor Plain, but the lack of adequate water to sustain stock maintained the region relatively intact from intense exploitation. In 1933 the United Aborigines Missions established itself there, drawing substantial numbers of desert folk to the site for food and clothing, and four years later, the government established a 2,000-square-mile (5,200 km^{2}) reserve. In 1941, the anthropologists Ronald and Catherine Berndt spent several months in the Aboriginal camp at the water soak and mission, and in the following three-year period (1942–1945) wrote one of the first scientific ethnographies of an Australian tribal group, based on his interviews in a community of some 700 desert people. Traditional life still continued since Ooldea lay on the fringe of the desert, and incoming Aboriginal people could return to their old hunting style.

== Nuclear testing, dispossession and return ==
When the Australian Government decided in the early 1950s to set aside the Emu Field and Maralinga in the area for British nuclear testing, the community at Ooldea was forcibly removed from the land and resettled further south at Yalata, in 1952. Road blocks and soldiers barred any return.

Yalata, bordering on the Nullarbor Plain offered a totally different ecological environment; in place of the spinifex plains to the north, the Maralinga Tjaruta people found an arid stone plain, with poor thin soil and a powdery limestone that kicked up a grey dust when disturbed. Their word for "grey", namely tjilpi also signified the greying elders of a tribe, and the Aboriginal residents of Yalata called the new area parna tjilpi, the "grey earth/ground", suggesting that their forced relocation to Yalata went concomitantly with ageing towards death.

Between 1956 and 1957, seven atomic bombs were exploded on Maralinga land. In further minor trials from 1957 to 1962, plutonium was dispersed widely over much of the area. Compensation in 1993 of A$13.5 million was determined after three elders flew to London and presented samples of the contaminated soil in London in October 1991.

In 1962, the long-serving Premier of South Australia, Sir Thomas Playford, made a promise that their traditional lands would be restored to the people displaced at Yalata sometime in the future. Under the administration of his successor Frank Walsh, short two-week long bush trips were permitted, enabling them to re-connect with their traditional lifestyles. As negotiations got underway in the 1980s, the Indigenous peoples started setting up outstations near their original lands. With the passage of the Maralinga Tjarutja Land Rights Act 1984 under Premier John Bannon's government, the Maralinga Tjarutja secured freehold title in 1984, and the right to developmental funds from the State and Federal governments. They completed a move back into the area, to a new community called Oak Valley in March 1985.

Under an agreement between the governments of the United Kingdom and Australia in 1995, efforts were made to clean up the Maralinga site, being completed in 1995. Tonnes of soil and debris contaminated with plutonium and uranium were buried in two trenches about 16 metres (52 ft) deep. The effectiveness of the cleanup has been disputed on a number of occasions.

In 2003 South Australian Premier Mike Rann opened a new school costing A$2,000,000 at Oak Valley. The new school replaced two caravans with no running water or air-conditioning, a facility that had been described as the "worst school in Australia".

In May 2004, following the passage of special legislation, Rann fulfilled a pledge he had made to Maralinga leader Archie Barton as Aboriginal Affairs Minister in 1991, by handing back title to 21,000 square kilometres (8,100 mi^{2}) of land to the Maralinga Tjarutja and Pila Nguru people. The land, 1,000 kilometres (620 mi) north-west of Adelaide and abutting the Western Australia border, is now known as Mamungari Conservation Park. It includes the Serpentine Lakes and was the largest land return since Premier John Bannon's hand over of Maralinga lands in 1984. The returned lands included the sacred Ooldea area, which also included the site of Daisy Bates' mission camp.

In 2014, the last part of the land remaining in the Woomera Prohibited Area, known as "Section 400", was excised and returned to free access.

== Maralinga Tjarutja Council ==
The Maralinga Tjarutja Council is an incorporated body constituted by the traditional Yalata and Maralinga owners to administer the lands granted to them under the Maralinga Tjarutja Land Rights Act 1984 (SA). The head office is in Ceduna.

The Maralinga Tjarutja and the Pila Nguru (or Spinifex people) also jointly own and administer the 21,357.85-square-kilometre (8,246.31 sq mi) Mamungari Conservation Park, which area is contained in the area total for the council area. Emu Field is now part of the council area, too, while the 3,300-square-kilometre (1,300 sq mi) Maralinga area is still a roughly square-shaped enclave within the council area.

The land surveyed and known as Section 400, 120 km^{2} (46 mi^{2}) within the Taranaki Plumes, was returned to Traditional Ownership in 2007. This land includes the area of land occupied by the Maralinga Township and the areas in which atomic tests were carried out by the British and Australian governments.

The final part of the 1,782 km^{2} (688 sq mi) former nuclear test site was returned in 2014.

== Documentary film ==
Maralinga Tjarutja, a May 2020 television documentary film directed by Larissa Behrendt and made by Blackfella Films for ABC Television, tells the story of the people of Maralinga. It was deliberately broadcast around the same time that the drama series Operation Buffalo was on, to give voice to the Indigenous people of the area and show how it disrupted their lives. Screenhub gave it 4.5 stars, calling it an "excellent documentary". The film shows the resilience of the Maralinga Tjarutja people, in which the elders "reveal a perspective of deep time and an understanding of place that generates respect for the sacredness of both", their ancestors having lived in the area for millennia. Despite the callous disregard for their occupation of the land shown by the British and Australians involved in the testing, the people have continued to fight for their rights to look after the contaminated land.

The film, which was produced by Darren Dale, won the 2020 AACTA Award for Best Direction in Nonfiction Television and the Silver Award for Documentary (Human Rights) at the 2021 New York Festivals TV & Film Awards.

== See also ==
- Maralinga, South Australia
- British nuclear tests at Maralinga
- Woomera Prohibited Area
- Downwinders

== Sources ==
- Berndt, Ronald Murray (1941). "Tribal Migrations and Myths Centering on Ooldea, South Australia". Oceania. 12 (1): 1–20. doi:10.1002/j.1834-4461.1941.tb00343.x.
- Berndt, Ronald Murray (1974). Australian Aboriginal Religion. Brill Archive. ISBN 9789004037281.
- Cross, Roger (2005) [First published 2003]. "British Nuclear Tests and the Indigenous People of Australia". In Barnaby, Frank; Holdstock, Douglas (eds.). The British Nuclear Weapons Programme, 1952-2002. Routledge. pp. 75–88. ISBN 978-1-135-76197-4.
- "Eyre Western SA Government region" (PDF). The Government of South Australia.
- Hercus, Luise Anna (1999). A Grammar of the Wirangu Language from the West Coast of South Australia. Pacific linguistics. ISBN 978-0-858-83505-4.
- "Homeland ceded to traditional owners". The Sydney Morning Herald. 5 November 2014.
- "Maralinga hand-over prompts celebration". The Age. AAP. 25 August 2004.
- "Maralinga students welcome new school". Australia: ABC News. 4 May 2003.
- "Maralinga Tjarutja Land Rights Act 1984". Australasian Legal Information Institute. 1984.
- Mazel, Odette (2006). "Returning Parna Wiru: Restitution of the Maralinga Lands to the Traditional owners". In Langton, Marcia; Mazel, Odette; Palmer, Lisa; Shain, Kathryn; Tehan, Maureen (eds.). Settling with Indigenous People: Modern Treaty and Agreement-making in South Australia. Federation Press. pp. 159–180. ISBN 978-1-862-87618-7.
- Palmer, Kingsley (1990). "Government policy and Aboriginal aspirations: self-management at Yalata". In Tonkinson, Robert; Howard, Michael (eds.). Going it Alone?: Prospects for Aboriginal Autonomy; Essays in Honourt of Ronald and Catherine Berndt. Aboriginal Studies Press. pp. 165–183. ISBN 978-0-855-75566-9.
- Reece, Bob (2007). Daisy Bates: Grand Dame of the Desert. ISBN 978-0-642-27654-4 – via National Library of Australia.
- "School Context Statement" (PDF). Department for Education and Child Development, Government of South Australia. August 2015. pp. 1–11. Archived from the original (PDF) on 18 February 2017.
- Thurnwald, Richard (1951). Des Menschengeistes Erwachen, Wachsen und Irren: Versuch einer Paläopsychologie von Naturvölkern mit Einschluss der archaischen Stufe und der allgemein menschlichen Züge. Duncker & Humblot.
- Yu, Sarah (1999). Ngapa Kunangkul: Living Water. University of Western Australia.
