= Oak Valley, South Australia =

Aboriginal community in South Australia

Oak Valley
- Coordinates: 29°24′07″S 130°44′10″E
- Country: Australia
- State: South Australia
- Region: Eyre Western
- LGA: Maralinga Tjarutja

Government
  - State electorate: Giles
  - Federal division: Grey
- Elevation: 290 m (950 ft)
- Time zone: UTC+9:30 (ACST)
  - Summer (DST): UTC+10:30 (ACDT)
- Mean max temp: 25.5 °C (77.9 °F)
- Mean min temp: 11.8 °C (53.2 °F)
- Annual rainfall: 223.6 mm (8.80 in)

Oak Valley is the only community of Maralinga Tjarutja Aboriginal Council (AC) Local Government Area (LGA), South Australia. The population fluctuates, but a 2016 survey reported around 128 people, mostly Aboriginal. It is approximately 128 kilometres (80 mi) NNW of the original Maralinga township, and lies at the southern edge of the Great Victoria Desert. It is named for the desert oaks that populate the vicinity of the community.

It was established in 1984 with funds provided as compensation for the dispossession of the Maralinga people from their lands following the British nuclear tests which took place between 1956 and 1963. The risks associated with living in an area contaminated by plutonium, even after the cleanup have been a significant concern.

In 2003, South Australian Premier Mike Rann and Education Minister Trish White opened a new school at Oak Valley, replacing what had been described as the "worst school in Australia". In May 2004, following the passage of special legislation, Premier Rann handed back title to 21,000 square kilometres (8,100 sq mi) of land to the Maralinga Tjarutja and Pila Nguru people. The land, 1,000 kilometres (620 mi) northwest of Adelaide and abutting the Western Australia border, was called the Unnamed Conservation Park. It is now known as Mamungari Conservation Park, and includes the Serpentine Lakes. It was the largest land return since Premier John Bannon's handover of Maralinga lands in 1984. At the 2004 ceremony Premier Rann said the return of the land fulfilled a promise he made in 1991 when he was Aboriginal Affairs Minister, after he passed legislation to return lands including the sacred Ooldea area (which also included the site of Daisy Bates' mission camp) to the Maralinga Tjarutja people.

Images from Oak Valley and the Maralinga lands were the focus of an exhibition at the 2002 Adelaide Festival.

== Climate ==
Oak Valley has a subtropical desert climate (Köppen: BWh). It experiences hot summers, mild winters and low precipitation year-round. The climate table below contains information from the nearest weather station at Maralinga. Temperature & 3 pm observations were only recorded from 1955 to 1967, whilst rainfall data was collected until 2022.

Climate data for Oak Valley (Maralinga) (30.16°S 131.58°E, 290 m (950 ft) m AMSL) (1955-2022 data)
Month	Jan	Feb	Mar	Apr	May	Jun	Jul	Aug	Sep	Oct	Nov	Dec	Year
Record high °C (°F)	44.7 (112.5)	43.1 (109.6)	40.5 (104.9)	38.8 (101.8)	31.7 (89.1)	27.6 (81.7)	27.8 (82.0)	33.0 (91.4)	37.3 (99.1)	41.1 (106.0)	43.3 (109.9)	43.2 (109.8)	44.7 (112.5)
Mean daily maximum °C (°F)	33.2 (91.8)	32.8 (91.0)	30.1 (86.2)	25.6 (78.1)	20.9 (69.6)	18.4 (65.1)	16.9 (62.4)	18.8 (65.8)	22.4 (72.3)	26.5 (79.7)	29.5 (85.1)	30.4 (86.7)	25.5 (77.8)
Mean daily minimum °C (°F)	16.5 (61.7)	17.0 (62.6)	15.7 (60.3)	13.2 (55.8)	9.8 (49.6)	8.1 (46.6)	6.5 (43.7)	7.0 (44.6)	9.2 (48.6)	11.4 (52.5)	13.4 (56.1)	14.2 (57.6)	11.8 (53.3)
Record low °C (°F)	9.8 (49.6)	8.1 (46.6)	8.9 (48.0)	3.9 (39.0)	2.0 (35.6)	0.7 (33.3)	−0.7 (30.7)	−0.1 (31.8)	1.0 (33.8)	2.2 (36.0)	3.7 (38.7)	7.1 (44.8)	−0.7 (30.7)
Average precipitation mm (inches)	14.3 (0.56)	19.9 (0.78)	19.9 (0.78)	14.9 (0.59)	19.0 (0.75)	19.5 (0.77)	17.5 (0.69)	14.8 (0.58)	19.8 (0.78)	17.9 (0.70)	20.5 (0.81)	26.0 (1.02)	223.6 (8.80)
Average precipitation days (≥ 0.2 mm)	2.8	2.9	3.3	3.7	5.0	5.6	5.8	5.3	4.5	4.0	4.0	4.2	51.1
Average afternoon relative humidity (%)	24	26	28	31	40	43	45	39	32	25	23	26	32
Average dew point °C (°F)	5.3 (41.5)	6.8 (44.2)	6.4 (43.5)	4.4 (39.9)	4.0 (39.2)	3.6 (38.5)	3.0 (37.4)	1.6 (34.9)	1.2 (34.2)	1.0 (33.8)	1.7 (35.1)	4.2 (39.6)	3.6 (38.5)
Source: Bureau of Meteorology (1955-2022 data)

== Neighbouring Aboriginal communities ==
- Tjuntjuntjara, Western Australia (west)
- Anangu Pitjantjatjara Yankunytjatjara (north)
- Yalata, South Australia (south)

Driving distances from Oak Valley to main centres are:

- Ceduna to Oak Valley – 516 km (approx 7 hours)
- Yalata to Oak Valley – 315 km (about 5 hours (via Ooldea))
- Port Lincoln to Oak Valley – 919 km
- Adelaide to Oak Valley – 1288 km

== See also ==
- Oak Valley Ananga School
