= Southern Australia =

Coordinates: 31°S 141°E

- Region
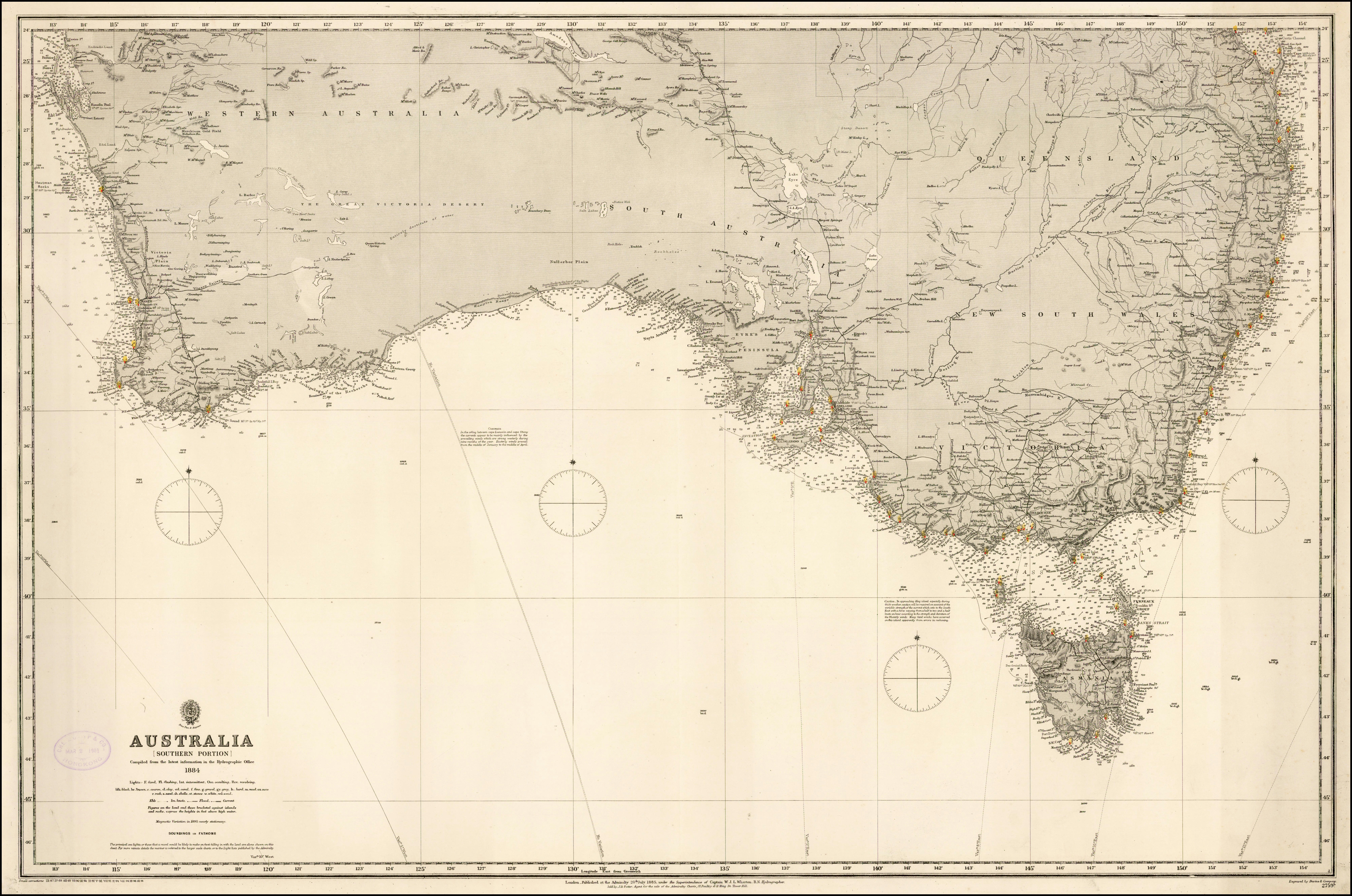
- Southern Australia, generally defined as latitude 26 degrees and below
- States: New South Wales, Victoria, ACT, South Australia, Tasmania, southern Western Australia

Southern Australia is generally considered to consist of the states and territories of Australia of New South Wales, Victoria, the Australian Capital Territory (Canberra), Tasmania and South Australia. The part of Western Australia south of latitude 26° south (which includes the state capital Perth) — a definition widely used in law and state government policy — is also usually included.

Covering about half of the total area of Australia, Southern Australia includes about three-quarters of the Australian population, the main agricultural areas and the main industrial centres. The area is also notable for its primarily temperate, mediterranean, alpine or arid environmental and climatic conditions which contrasts to the mainly tropical climate of Northern Australia. Southern Australia has long suffered extreme weather events due to the arid landscape, however in recent times these conditions have been exacerbated due to climate change.

The region has several key industries which contribute to the high gross domestic product and large value of exports. Southern Western Australia largely focuses on mining as a key export, whilst the states of Victoria and New South Wales focus on traditional sectors such as manufacturing, tourism and financial services. Tasmania and South Australia are regional economies, primarily concentrated on manufacturing and fisheries.

== Economy ==
Southern Australia is the richest part of Australia, home to a diversified economy with an expansive variety of exports including minerals, wine, dairy, livestock, education, and tourism. Across the region, there is sustainable employment, with all state's unemployment rates being below 8%.

Economists have suggested that Australia moves at two different speeds, with some states focusing on traditional sectors such as manufacturing, finance and tourism, and others emphasising mining industries. NSW and Victoria are seen as traditional economies, primarily focusing on said "traditional" industries, whilst South Western Australia emphasises mining. Regional economies such as Tasmania and South Australia prioritise manufacturing, closing them off to advancing in faster growing industries.

Attributable to the region's rich mineral soils, states such as Southern Western Australia and South Australia emphasise exports such as petroleum, iron ore and other minerals. Such commodities account for 36% of Western Australia's gross state product, employing approximately 124,000 people state-wide. South Australia is also home to rich agricultural soil creating a booming trade of fresh produce, seafood, and wine. South Australia's wine industry accounts for 17.2% of overseas exports, also stimulating fortuitous flow on tourism.

Such fertile soils transpire across the region, whereby Victoria exports 80% of Australia's produced dairy. The state encompasses just 3% of Australian land yet produces 22% of the nation's GDP.

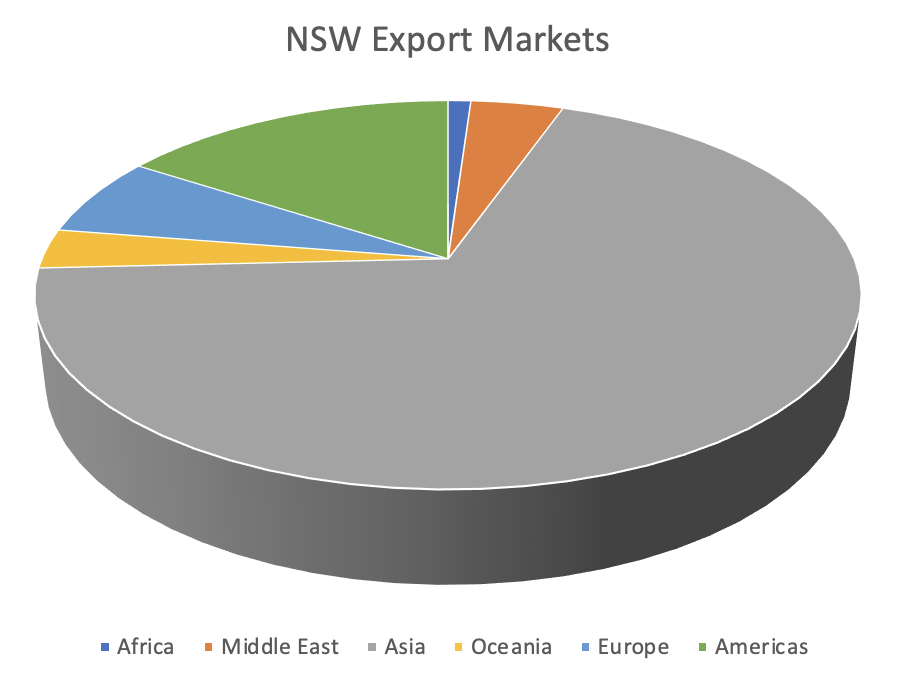
NSW Key Export Markets- adapted from DPI NSW 2019 data.

Whilst Western Australia and Queensland have experienced high growth due to the mining resource boom, NSW has recorded dwindling economic growth, measuring lower Gross State Product (GSP) than national GDP since 2001. Nonetheless, NSW's main economic activities include the exporting of minerals such as coal, copper and concentrates, livestock, cropping and horticulture. NSW's number one export market is Asia grossing $3,068m annually, followed by the Americas and Europe.

Contrastingly, the ACT has experienced major growth of approximately 13% over the past 3 years. This is namely due to the prominent tertiary education sector and subsequent increase in popularity among students.

Tasmania's strongest industry is unsurprisingly tourism. Isolated from mainland Australia, the government invests in numerous infrastructure projects to strengthen Tasmania's economy.

== Climate and geography ==
Comparative to Northern Australia's typical tropical climate, Southern Australia is home to a variety of climates including alpine, temperate, Mediterranean, and arid. Generally speaking, southern Australia experiences hot, dry summers followed by wet winters. Due to the arid nature of the land and intense heat, the region is prone to regular bushfires throughout the summer months. In addition, these fires have been exacerbated by the south-eastern 13-year drought from 1997 to 2009. However, these natural occurrences have been greatly aggravated due to climate change.

The southern coastline is subject to dramatic temperature changes over the summer months where temperatures regularly reach 45°C. Contrastingly, moving inland, the land converts to desert landscapes interrupted by fertile soils, home to renowned wine regions such as the Barossa Valley and Margaret River.

The Great Dividing Range runs north to south along Australia's east coast bringing the high elevations of it cold weather, whilst the easterly side receives the most rain and the west plains suffer the heat. Despite the overarching hot environment of southern Australia, regions of NSW, Victoria, and Tasmania experience winter snowfall, creating several ski resorts.

Majority of southern Australia is uninhabited due to its arid nature, with populations concentrating in the cities of Sydney, Canberra, Melbourne, Adelaide, and Perth. Of Australia's 9 main cities in Australia, southern Australia is home to 7 of them, making the region the most populated area of Australia.

== Climate change ==
Southern Australia is experiencing rapid population growth and density, and when paired with increasing weather extremes presents a consequential concern for life and property. Rising temperatures have led to an increased risk of health issues such as heart-related mortality, infectious diseases, and pollen allergies.

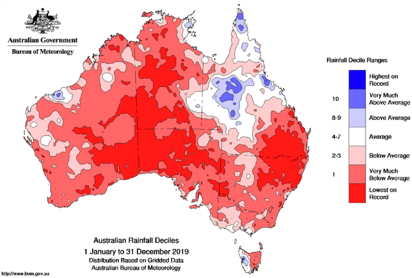
Australian Rainfall Deciles. (2019). Bureau of Meteorology.

The effect of large-scale extreme events such as prolonged heat waves not only impacts human activities but mortality rates; this presenting critical reasons to address climate change.

Whilst Australian rainfall has always been variable and influenced by weather patterns such as La Ninã and El Niño, there are underlying trends that implicate global warming as the cause of drier winter seasons across south-eastern and south-western Australia. Since 1970, the region has experienced 20% less rainfall than in the period of 1900–1969, and now since 1999 that has increased to 26% less rainfall. Although southern Australia has experienced declining rainfall in the colder months of April to October, the northern counterpart has seen increasing rainfall since the 1970s. The prevalence of flash flooding is set to continue to intensify, brought by a 7% increase in short-duration extreme rainfall events.

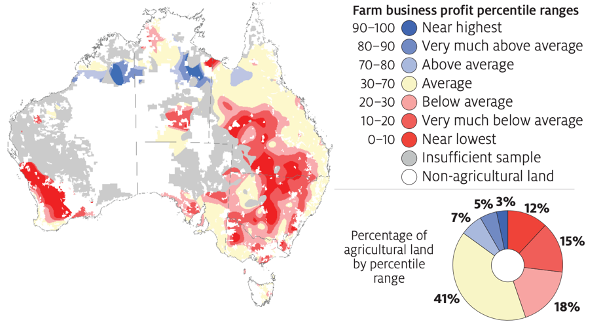
Effect of 2000 to 2019 climate conditions on average farm business profit. ABARES farmpredict 2019.

An increase in the simultaneous occurrence of two or more extreme events, known as compound extreme events, has largely impacted Southern Australia's agricultural industry. In each year of dry conditions and synchronous heatwaves, a typical cropping farm will experience a substantial loss of approximately $125,000 whilst in a regular year profit exceeds $230,000. Simultaneously, drought years lead to reduction of livestock herd sizes as we see lower birth rates alongside discretionary forfeiture of dairy cows to the beef trade.

=== Climate change and bushfires ===
In the past decade, southern Australia has experienced a surge in sweltering summers, coupled with low rainfall leading to a longer and more devastating bushfire season. Scientists have stated that the increased regularity and intensity of these conditions is a direct cause of climate change, including increasing temperatures. The region is experiencing an increase in yearly fire days, decreased annual rainfall, increases in mean sea level pressure, and tropical cyclones.

=== 2019-2020 summer bushfires ===
Whilst climate change is not the sole contributor to Australia's devastating fire experience, since the 1950s, it has caused an increase in their occurrence and intensity. Such effects have been seen in the 2019-2020 bushfires which ravished mainly NSW and Victoria but additionally South Australia and Southern Western Australia. 2019 was the driest and hottest year on record, with the annual average temperature increase measuring at 1.52°C.

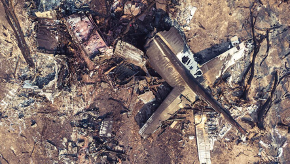
C-130 Air Tanker Wreckage Remains. 2020 NSW- Australian Bushfires. SBS News.

Australia covers 134 million hectares and as at 18 February 2020, more than 19 million hectares of land was burned. 33 people died, including the death of 3 US firefighters whose Air Tanker crashed whilst battling a bushfire in NSW. Approximately 48% of South Australia's Kangaroo Island land was burned.

WWF commissioned scientists estimate that nearly three billion animals were killed or displaced by the 2019-2020 fires, not including insects. Across NSW, up to 81% of Koala land was burned, and a parliamentary inquiry found that without urgent government intervention and protection, the koala will become extinct in NSW by 2050.

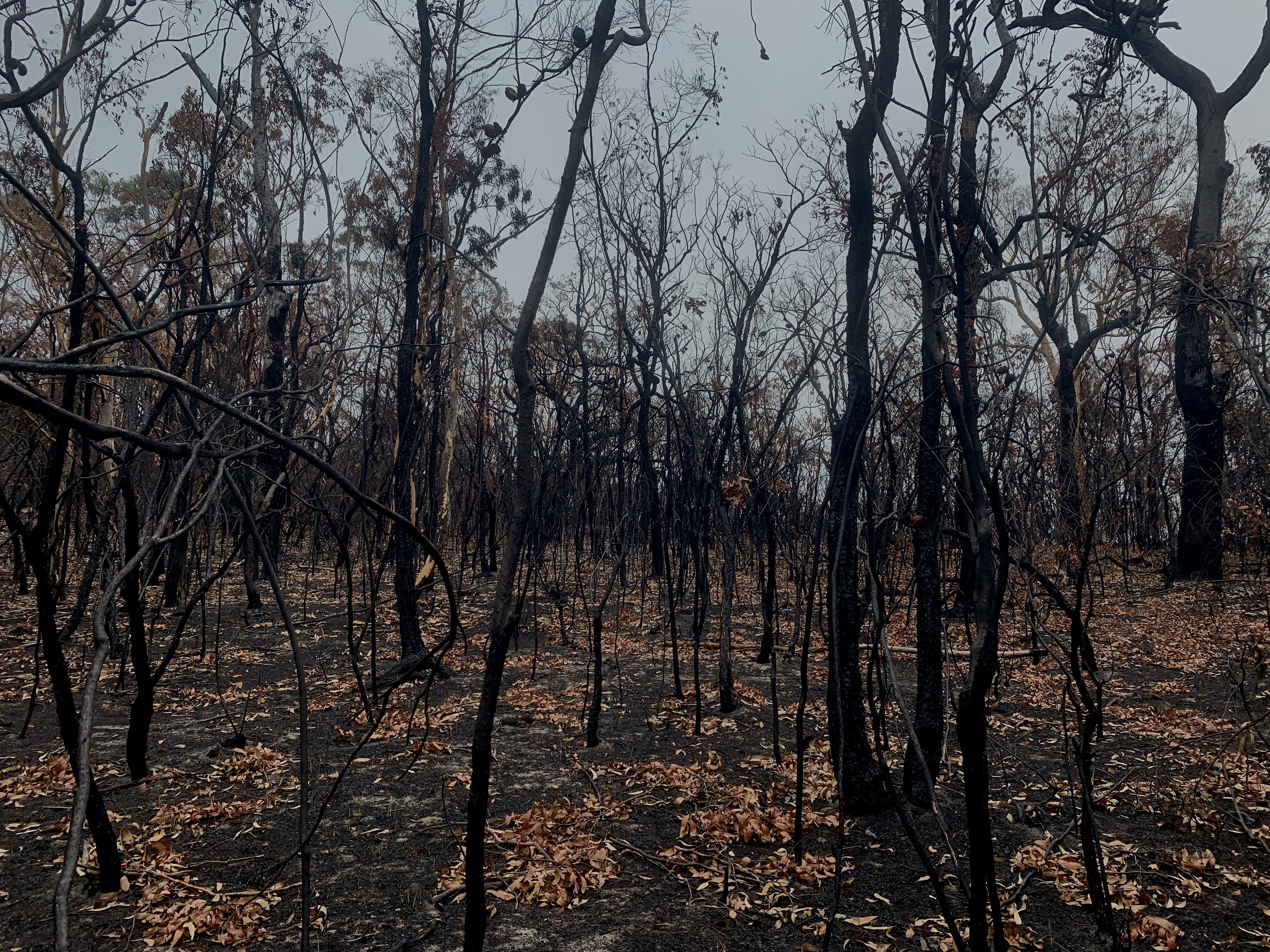
Yengo National Park, NSW- 2019-2020 summer bushfires

Not only do bushfires destroy Australian flora and fauna, the NSW independent commission into the 2019-2020 "black summer" bushfires found that over 400 Australians died prematurely as a result of smoke inhalation. Evidence has shown that sustained poor air quality increases the risk of respiratory illnesses, some cancers, and heart disease. Indigenous Australians are more susceptible to the health detriments of bushfire smoke due to the demographic prevalence of chronic health conditions. The report implicated the role of climate change and outlined the imperative necessity to address climate change as the proponent for increased bushfire risk.

"Countries that clearly have so much to lose from bushfires and other climate change damage and so much to gain from a more rapid transition to a renewable energy economy – must do more. Countries like Australia, and within them leading states like NSW" – Gwen and David Jagger.

Temporary bushfire relief is expected over the 2020-2021 summer season as the region enters into a La Ninã climate pattern.

=== Other major bushfires ===
Other major bushfires within the southern region include 2009’s Victorian Black Saturday where over 2,000 homes were destroyed, and 173 people died. Additionally, 2003’s Victorian and Canberran Alpine bushfires claimed the lives of 10,000 livestock animals and 1.2 million hectares of land.

== British nuclear testing ==
In the 1950s and 60s Britain deployed numerous nuclear tests in Australia, namely the South Australian Maralinga and Emu Field tests. The Maralinga sites were chosen due to their "vast, empty useless spaces" despite the area being Indigenous Australian Anangu Pitjantjatjara land. Meagre Indigenous citizen rights, coupled with rampant racial discrimination, led to the Indigenous peoples' prolonged emotional, physical, and mental suffering after having limited access to resources for over 30 years. The British government delegated one single officer the task of covering hundreds of thousands of square kilometres, resulting in radiation exposure to oblivious Indigenous inhabitants. Whilst inconclusive, approximately 30% of British and Australian servicemen who worked in the area have died of cancer.

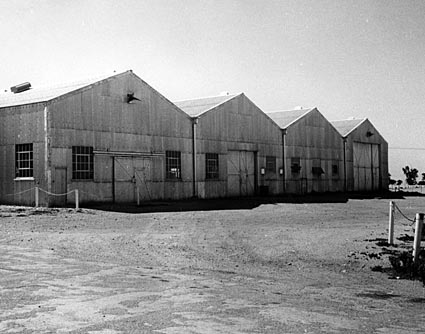
Atomic Test Site in Maralinga, SA.

As a result of Britain's filtering of information to the Australian government, complacent ignorance regarding the tests' hazards caused environmental and health problems for local Emu Field's Yanykunytjatjara people. An incident known as "Black Mist" caused significant health problems and several deaths for Indigenous locals. This was denied by the British government for 29 years, and only following the Royal Commission did it admit knowledge of the detriments it caused.

A Maralinga clean-up program, Operation Brumby, would relinquish any British responsibility once the area was deemed safe. The British reported the area safe until, eight years later, the Liberal-National government questioned the report's authenticity. Britain's declaration that any radioactive contaminants were "irrecoverable" was found to be falsified and Britain was ordered to repatriate half a kilogram of remaining contaminants. Following these fabrications, the Australian government widely rejected Britain's reports, forming its own views and research, leading to a greater recognition of the damage to the Indigenous locals and environment.

=== Moving forward ===
Following a 1985 Royal Commission into the events, numerous findings were outlined, implicating Britain as failing to provide sufficient recovery efforts alongside Australia's petty compliance. In December 1993, after multiple attempts by the Australian government to recover payment, Britain paid 20 million euros, despite the clean-up and compensation costing in excess of $110 million AUD. The Maralinga site was only returned to its traditional owners in November 2009.

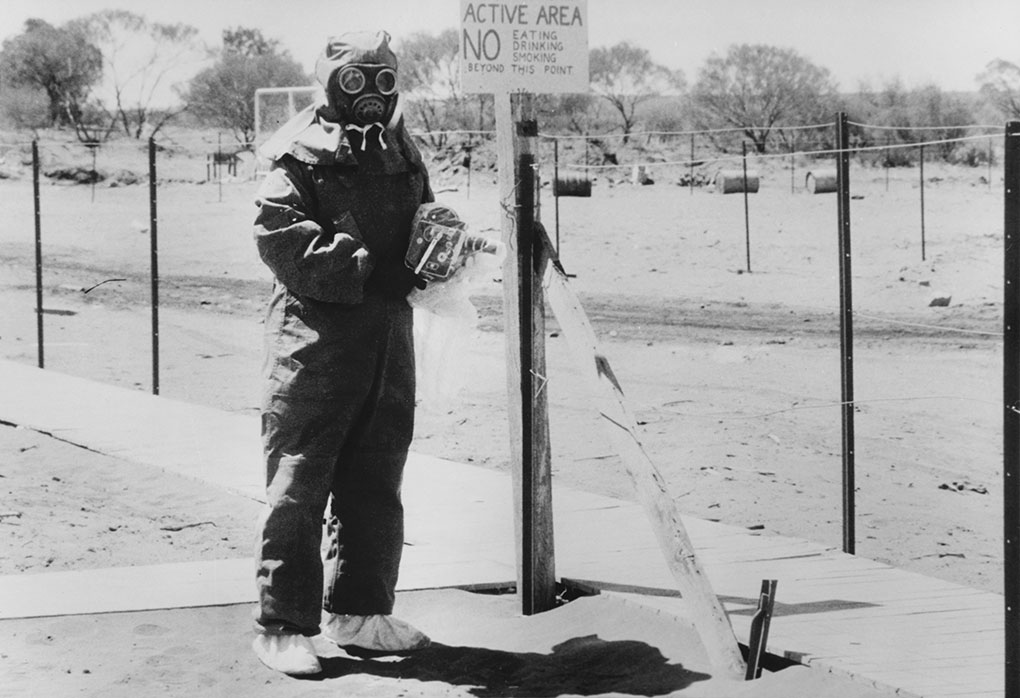
Australian officer in protective clothing at Maralinga, SA.

Whilst Maralinga is declared safe now, it takes to a ghost town, with only 4 people permanently living in the region. One of the radioactive contaminants, Plutonium-239 has a radioactive half-life of 24,000 years, meaning that whilst recovery efforts have proved effective, for a long time coming, the area will still suffer from stigma and caution surrounding the traces of material in soil. However at Emu Field, the test trials only contained materials with short half-lives, leaving the area unexposed to long-term contamination.

== See also ==
- Northern Australia
- Central Australia
- Eastern states of Australia
- Western Australia
