= Ngalia (Western Desert) =

Aboriginal Australian people

- People
- Ethnicity: Aboriginal Australian
- Location: Western Australia; South Australia

The Ngalia, or Ngalea, are an Aboriginal Australian people of the Western Desert cultural bloc resident in land extending from Western Australia to the west of South Australia. They are not to be confused with the Ngalia of the Northern Territory.

== Country ==
The Ngalia's traditional lands are around the salt lake areas, such as the Serpentine Lakes in the Great Victoria Desert, northwest of Ooldea, South Australia, in what is now the Mamungari Conservation Park. Norman Tindale estimated their tribal lands as covering an extension of some 15,000 square miles (39,000 km^{2}).

== Language ==
The Ngalia language, also known as Ooldean, is a dialect of the Western Desert language.

== Alternative names ==
- Nangga ('men' in the sense that they had undergone circumcision)
- Nanggaranggu
- Nanggarangku (Pitjantjatjara exonym bearing the meaning of 'hostile men')
- Ngalia, Ngalija
- Ngaliawongga
- Tangara
- Willoorara ((people of the) 'west')
- Windakan (applied to their language, and also to the Wirangu)

Source: Tindale 1974, p. 215

== Notable people ==
- Kado Muir, artist, anthropologist and politician

== Sources ==
- Bates, Daisy (1918). "Aborigines of the West Coast of South Australia; vocabularies and ethnological notes". Transactions of the Royal Society of South Australia. 42. Adelaide: 152–167 – via BHL.
- Campbell, T. D.; Lewis, A. J. (1926). "The aborigines of South Australia: anthropometric descriptive and other observations recorded at Ooldea". Transactions of the Royal Society of South Australia. 50. Adelaide: 183–191 – via BHL.
- Elkin, A. P. (September 1931). "The Social Organization of South Australian Tribes". Oceania. 2 (1). Adelaide: 44–73. doi:10.1002/j.1834-4461.1931.tb00022.x. JSTOR 40327353.
- Howitt, Alfred William (1904). The native tribes of south-east Australia (PDF). Macmillan.
- Tindale, Norman Barnett (1974). "Ngalea (SA)". Aboriginal Tribes of Australia: Their Terrain, Environmental Controls, Distribution, Limits, and Proper Names. Australian National University Press. ISBN 978-0-708-10741-6.
