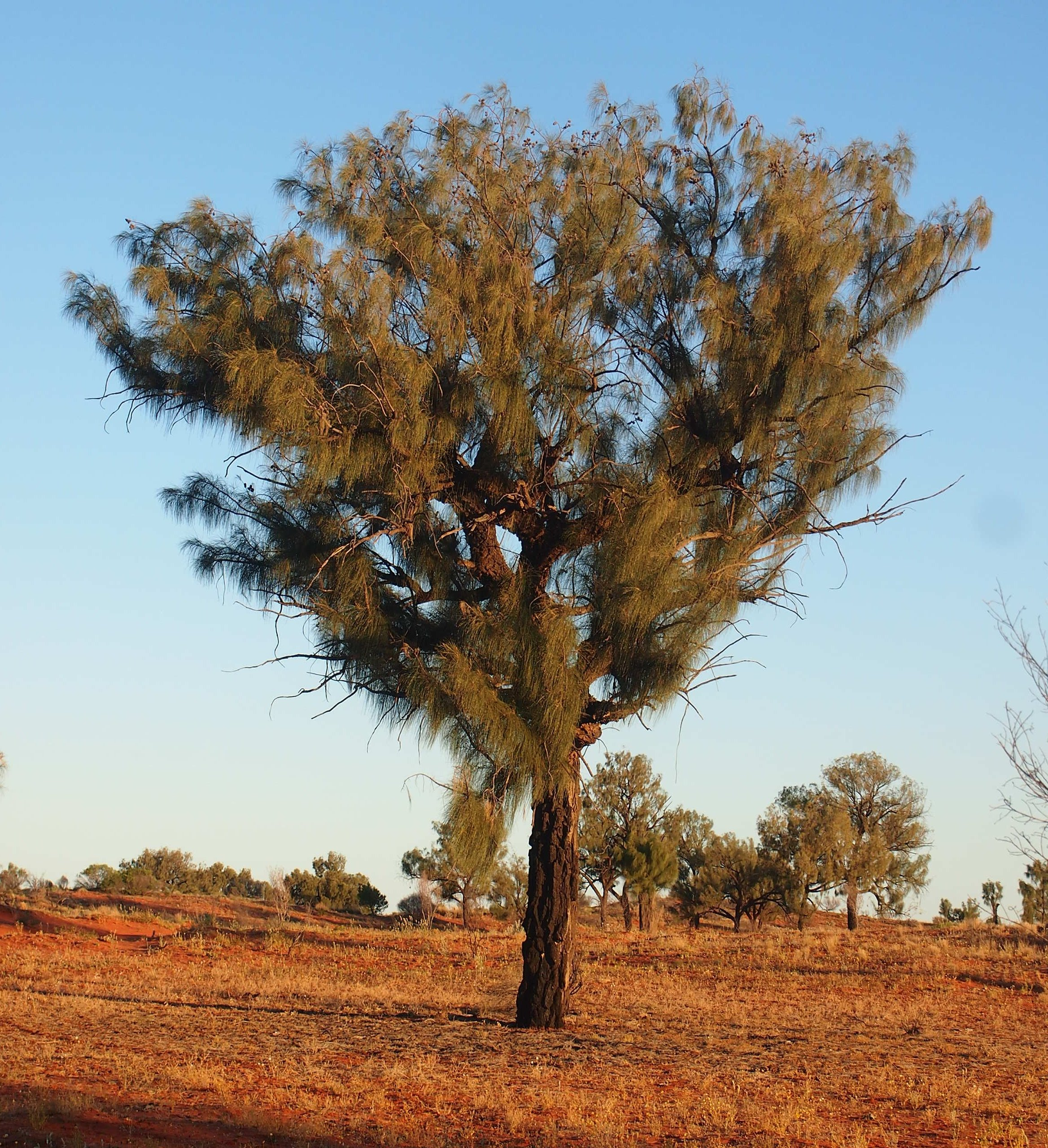

Conservation status
- Least Concern (IUCN 3.1)

Scientific classification
- Kingdom: Plantae
- Clade: Embryophytes
- Clade: Tracheophytes
- Clade: Spermatophytes
- Clade: Angiosperms
- Clade: Eudicots
- Clade: Rosids
- Order: Fagales
- Family: Casuarinaceae
- Genus: Allocasuarina
- Species: A. decaisneana

Binomial name
- Allocasuarina decaisneana (F.Muell.) L.A.S.Johnson
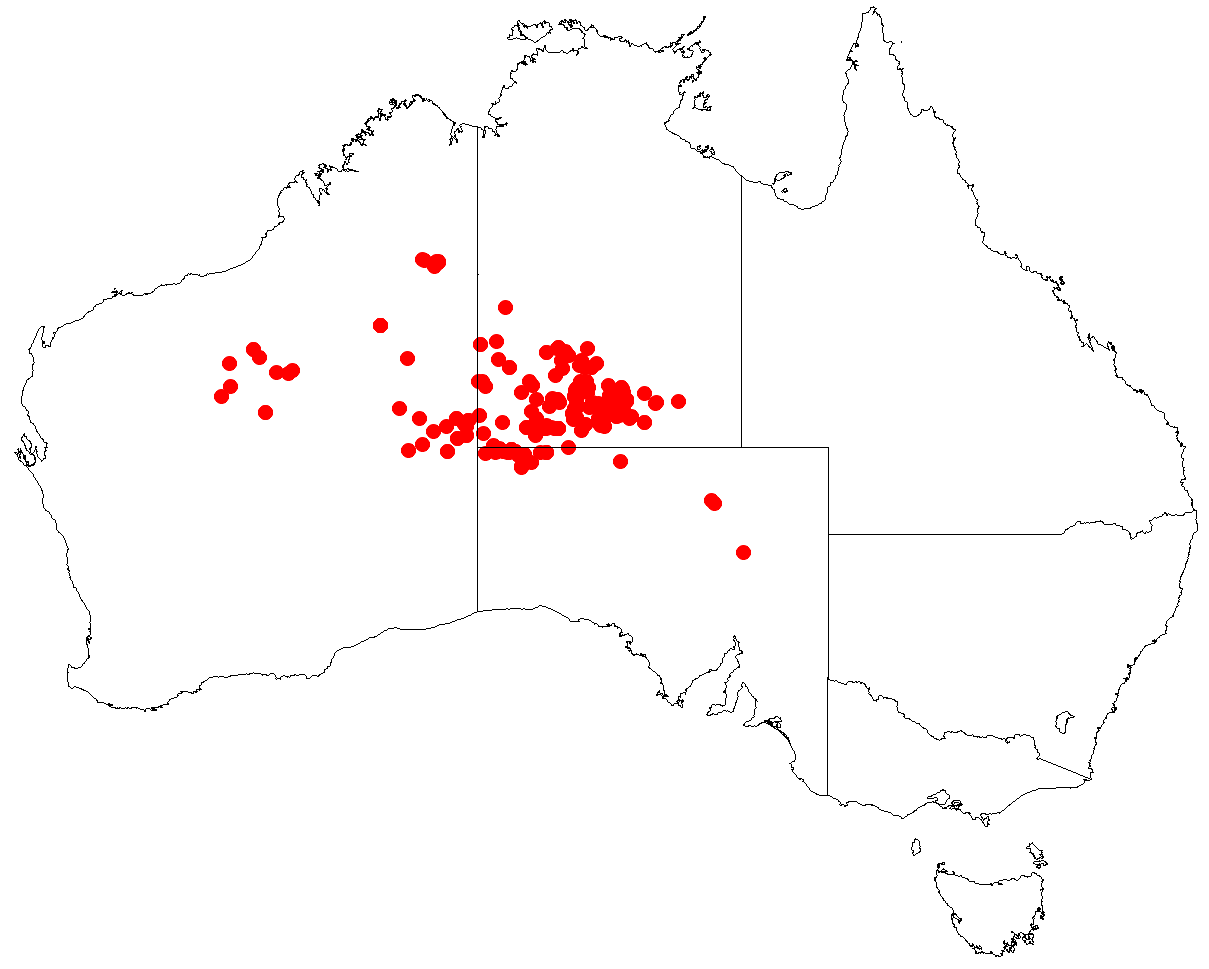
- Occurrence data from AVH

Synonyms
- Casuarina decaisneana F.Muell.

= Allocasuarina decaisneana =

Desert oak

Species of plant

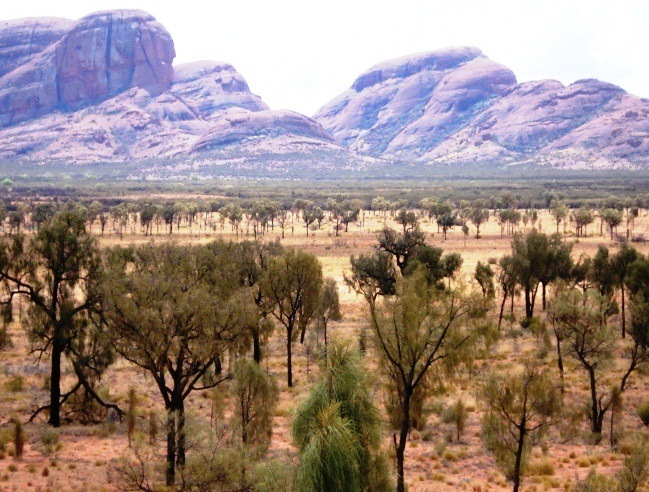
Stand of desert oak near Kata Tjuta

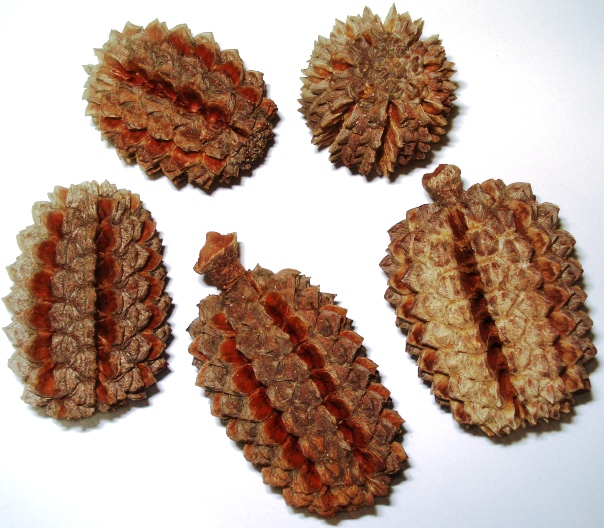
Mature cones

Allocasuarina decaisneana, commonly known as desert oak, desert sheoak, or kurkara by the Aṉangu peoples, is a species of flowering plant in the family Casuarinaceae and is endemic to Central Australia. It is a dioecious tree that typically grows to a height of 10–16 m (33–52 ft) and has long, drooping branchlets, the leaves reduced to scales in whorls of four, the mature fruiting cones 28–95 mm (1.1–3.7 in) long containing winged seeds (samaras) 8.5–17 mm (0.3–0.7 in) long.

== Description ==
Allocasuarina decaisneana is a dioecious tree that typically grows to 10–16 m (33–52 ft) high and 3–8 m (9.8–26.2 ft) wide. Its trunk has deeply furrowed, corky bark when mature. Its branchlets are drooping, up to 500 mm (20 in) long, the leaves reduced to erect, sharply pointed teeth 1.7–3.2 mm (0.07–0.1 in) long, arranged in whorls of four around the branchlets. The sections of branchlet between the leaf whorls (the "articles") are 20–60 mm (0.8–2.4 in) long and 0.7–1.5 mm (0.03–0.06 in) wide. Male flowers are arranged in spikes 20–40 mm (0.8–1.6 in) long, in whorls of about ten per cm (per 0.4 in), the anthers 0.8 mm (0.03 in) long. Female cones are cylindrical, often softly hairy when young, glabrous when mature and on a peduncle 5–15 mm (0.2–0.6 in) long. Mature cones are 28–95 mm (1.1–3.7 in) long and 20–35 mm (0.8–1.4 in) in diameter with a pointed tip on the bracteoles. The cones are the largest in the genus Allocasuarina, and the samaras are 8.5–17 mm (0.3–0.7 in) long. Flowering occurs in most months and cones are present on the tree throughout the year.

== Taxonomy ==
This species was first formally described in 1858 by Ferdinand von Mueller, who gave it the name Casuarina decaisneana in his Fragmenta phytographiae Australiae. It was reclassified in 1982 as Allocasuarina decaisneana by Lawrie Johnson in the Journal of the Adelaide Botanic Gardens. The specific epithet decaisneana honours the Belgian botanist Joseph Decaisne, who had never visited Australia or ever seen the tree.

== Distribution and habitat ==
Desert oak mainly grows in the swales between sand dunes in red sand. It is mainly found in the arid lands of the south of the Northern Territory, but is also common in inland Western Australia east of Billiluna to the Mann and Musgrave Ranges in the far north-west of South Australia. It is the only member of its family to occur in these areas, apart from Casuarina glauca that has been introduced in some of these areas.

== Ecology ==
The branchlets of A. decaisneana, also known as cladodes, perform the same function as leaves but conserve moisture. As the cladodes are shed from the tree they form a dense mat around the base preventing other plants from becoming established and competing for moisture and nutrients. The roots have nodules that contain nitrogen-fixing bacteria, which allows them to survive in sandy soils with low nutrient levels. In the first few years, the slow growing tree develops a fast growing tap-root that can reach a depth of over 10 metres (33 ft) and access any sub-surface water.

== Uses ==
The tree was useful to Indigenous Australian peoples who used it as a source of water. Water can be collected from tree hollows but surface roots could also be broken off in sections to provide potable water by draining the root when held vertically or by directly sucking the water out. The Aborigines also used the hard wood of the trees for firewood and for making weapons and other implements, and they used the seeds for food. A 10,000 year-old boomerang made from Allocasuarina wood was found in Wyrie Swamp, near Millicent, South Australia.

== In popular culture ==
The Aboriginal Community in Oak Valley, South Australia, on the southern edge of the Great Victoria Desert, which was established in 1985 for Anangu people displaced from Maralinga lands following nuclear weapons testing, takes its name from the tree.
