= Archie Barton =

Archie Barton AM
- Born: March 1936; Barton Railway Siding, South Australia
- Died: 18 October 2008 (72 years); Ceduna, South Australia
- Resting place: Oak Valley, South Australia; 29.40148°S 130.73977°E
- Known for: Australian Aboriginal political activist and land-rights campaigner
- Board member of: Imparja Television
- Partner: Mary Harrison
- Awards: Member of the Order of Australia, 1989; Honorary Doctorate, University of Adelaide, 1996

Archie Barton AM was an Aboriginal Australian political activist and land-rights campaigner. He played a key role in the 20-year campaign in the Maralinga Tjarutja people regaining ownership of their land, following the British nuclear tests at Maralinga, South Australia, and having the test sites cleaned up, and establishing Oak Valley with funds provided as compensation for the dispossession of the Maralinga people from their lands

== Work ==
Archie Barton had a varied work history:

- at around twelve years he became a rural worker, at Bon Bon Station near Coober Pedy, later a railway fettler, and then digging trenches for the South Australian Gas Company in Adelaide.
- mid-1970s he was in Port Augusta working for an Aboriginal alcohol rehabilitation service.
- 1981 he became community adviser to the Maralinga people, then based at Yalata
- a director of Imparja Television
- 1985 he became administrator of the new Maralinga Tjarutja Council following the Land Rights Act of 1984
  - He was a witness to the McClelland Royal Commission of 1984–1985 into the nuclear tests.
  - He represented the Maralinga people in London, as stated in the Sydney Morning Herald obituary 'In 1991 and 1992 he accompanied two elders and their counsel, Andrew Collett, to negotiate with the British government. He met the 9th Earl of Arran, then parliamentary under-secretary of the armed forces, and the army minister, Viscount Cranborne, whom Barton presented with two bags of the red plutonium-tainted sand.'
  - In 2005 he was found to have misappropriated $230,000 of community funds. Age and a misplaced cultural obligation to relatives were given as an explanation for his dishonesty. Barton was dismissed and a controller appointed.

The Maralinga Tjarutja Council was established in 1984 with funds provided as compensation for the dispossession of the Maralinga people from their lands following the Nuclear tests.

In 1995, the Australian Government admitted it had been complicit in the testing and paid $13.5 million into a trust fund for compensation and to cover further clean-up.

== Recognition ==
- An original member of the Council for Aboriginal Reconciliation
- South Australian Aboriginal of the Year in 1988
- Member of the Order of Australia in 1989
- presented with an Honorary Doctorate from the University of Adelaide in 1996
- 2004–2005 member of the National Indigenous Council

== Personal life ==
He was born to a Pitjantjatjara woman at the Barton Railway Siding, South Australia on the east–west Trans-Australian Railway line in March 1936, his father is not known but is believed to have been a white railway worker. As a child he also spent time at Ooldea, a nearby Aboriginal mission in the Maralinga area.

He was a victim of the Stolen Generations. At the age of five years he was placed into the care of the Christian Brethren's Umeewarra Children's Home at Port Augusta, one obituary states that 'When captured he was hiding behind the skirts of the legendary Daisy Bates'.

He was a gifted Australian rules footballer.

By his 30s he was addicted to alcohol to such that a doctor gave him six months to live, in response he gave up drinking. At one time he contracted tuberculosis and spent a year in a sanitorium.

He had a long relationship with Mary Harrison. After that relationship ended, he lived in sheds in Whyalla and Port Augusta.

Archie Barton died on 18 October 2008 in Ceduna and was buried at Oak Valley.
