= Prehistory of Australia =

Period of human habitation of Australia up to 1788

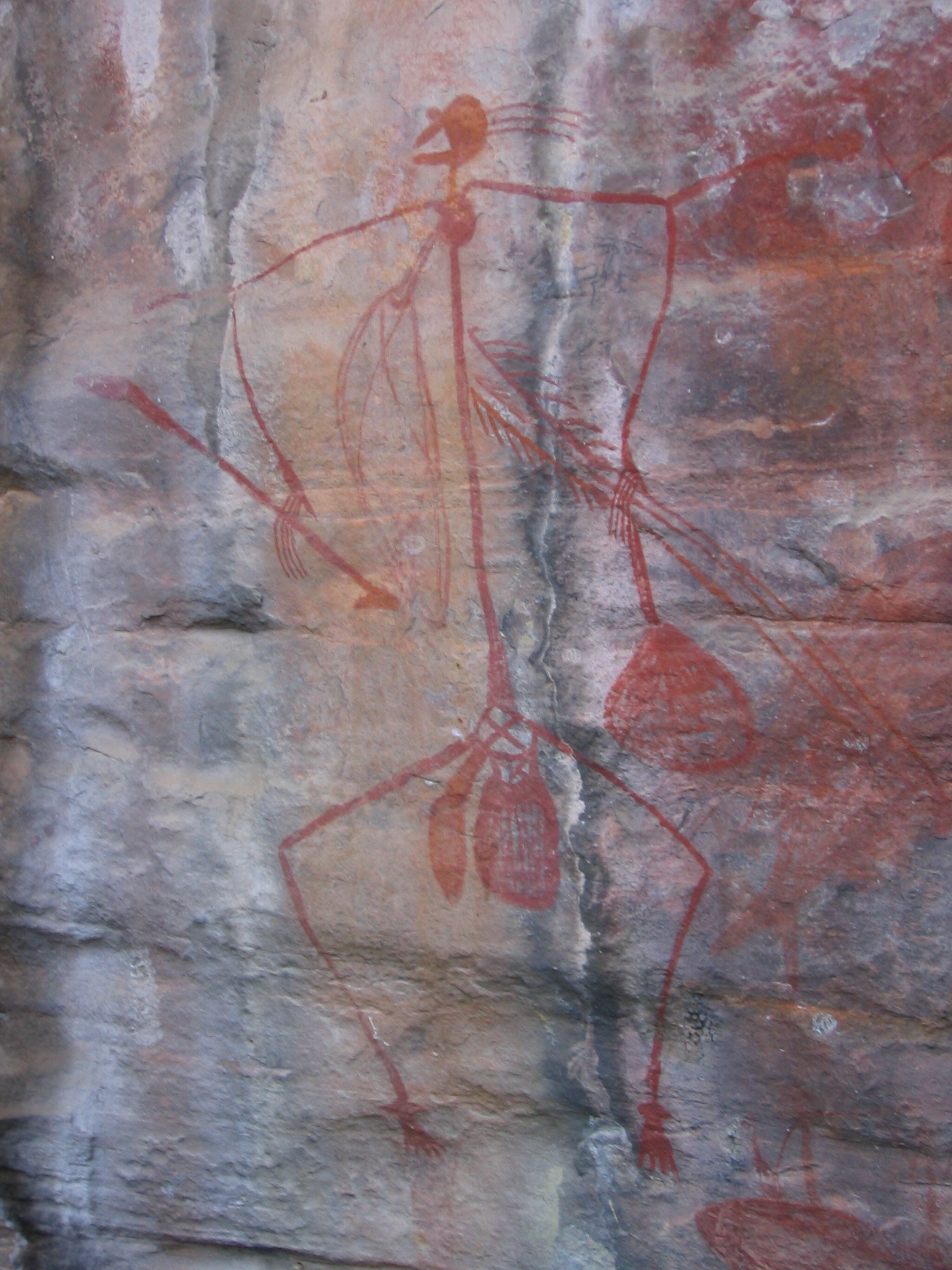
Aboriginal rock painting from Kakadu National Park

The prehistory of Australia is the period between the first human habitation of the Australian continent and the colonisation of Australia in 1788, which marks the start of consistent written documentation of Australia. This period has been variously estimated, with most evidence suggesting that it goes back between 50,000 and 65,000 years. This era is referred to as prehistory rather than history because knowledge of this time period does not derive from written documentation. However, some argue that Indigenous oral tradition should be accorded an equal status.

Human habitation of the Australian continent began with the migration of the ancestors of today's Aboriginal Australians by land bridges and short sea crossings from what is now Southeast Asia. It is uncertain how many waves of immigration may have contributed to these ancestors of modern Aboriginal Australians. The Madjedbebe rock shelter in Arnhem Land is perhaps the oldest site showing the presence of humans in Australia. The oldest human remains found are at Lake Mungo in New South Wales, which have been dated to around 41,000 years ago.

Estimates of the Aboriginal population at the time of the first European settlement in 1788, range from 300,000 to 3 million. They were complex hunter-gatherers with diverse economies and societies. There were about 600 tribes or nations and 250 languages with various dialects. Certain groups engaged in fire-stick farming, fish farming, and built semi-permanent shelters. The extent to which some groups engaged in agriculture is controversial.

The Torres Strait Islander people first settled their islands around 4,000 years ago. Culturally and linguistically distinct from mainland Aboriginal peoples, they were seafarers and obtained their livelihood from seasonal horticulture and the resources of their reefs and seas. Agriculture also developed on some islands and villages appeared by the 1300s.

== Arrival ==
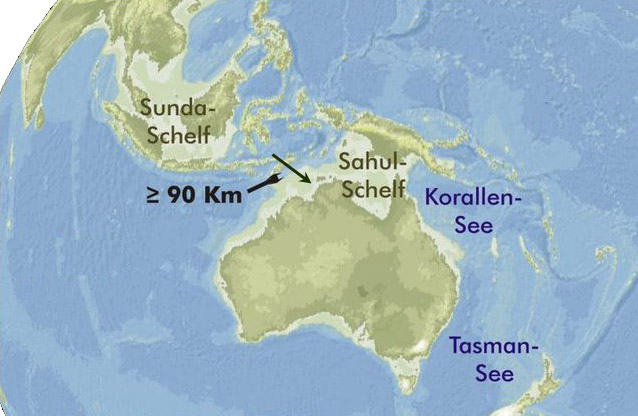
The map shows the probable extent of land and water at the time of the last glacial maximum and when the sea level was probably more than 150 m lower than today; it illustrates the formidable sea obstacle that migrants would have faced.

The earliest evidence of humans in Australia has been variously estimated, with most scholars, as of 2023, dating it between 50,000 and 65,000 years BP.

Recent genomic studies indicate that all non–sub-Saharan African populations, including present-day Aboriginal Australians, carry Neanderthal DNA acquired through a single interbreeding event in Europe between approximately 51.5 and 43.5 thousand years ago. If correct, this genetic evidence would constrain the timing of the ancestry of present-day Sahul populations to after ~50 kya, making it unlikely that a ~65 kya arrival contributed to the modern gene pool. However, earlier anatomically modern human occupations not ancestral to living populations cannot be ruled out.

There is considerable discussion among archaeologists as to the route taken by the first migrants to Australia, widely taken to be ancestors of the modern Aboriginal peoples. Migration took place during the closing stages of the Pleistocene, when sea levels were much lower than they are today. Repeated episodes of extended glaciation during the Pleistocene epoch resulted in decreases of sea levels by more than 100 metres in Australasia. People appear to have arrived by sea during a period of glaciation, when New Guinea and Tasmania were joined to the continent of Australia. The continental coastline extended much further out into the Timor Sea, and Australia and New Guinea formed a single landmass (known as Sahul), connected by an extensive land bridge across the Arafura Sea, Gulf of Carpentaria and Torres Strait. Nevertheless, the sea still presented a major obstacle so it is theorised that these ancestral people reached Australia by island hopping. Two routes have been proposed. One follows an island chain between Sulawesi and New Guinea and the other reaches North Western Australia via Timor. Rupert Gerritsen has suggested an alternative theory, involving accidental colonisation as a result of tsunamis. The journey still required sea travel, however, making them some of the world's earliest mariners.

In the 2013 book First Footprints: The Epic Story of the First Australians, Scott Cane writes that the first wave may have been prompted by the eruption of Toba, and if they arrived around 70,000 years ago, they could have crossed the water from Timor, when the sea level was low – but if they came later, around 50,000 years ago, a more likely route would be through the Moluccas to New Guinea. Given that the likely landfall regions have been under around 50 metres of water for the last 15,000 years, it is unlikely that the timing will ever be established with certainty.

=== Dating of sites ===
The minimum widely accepted time-frame for the arrival of humans in Australia is placed at least 48,000 years ago. Many sites dating from this time period have been excavated. In Arnhem Land Madjedbebe (formerly known as Malakunanja II) fossils and a rock shelter have been dated to around 65,000 years old, although a study in 2020 argues that this dating is unreliable. According to mitochondrial DNA research, Aboriginal people reached Eyre Peninsula (South Australia) 49,000–45,000 years ago from both the east (clockwise, along the coast, from northern Australia) and the west (anti-clockwise).

Radiocarbon dating suggests that they lived in and around Sydney for at least 30,000 years. In Parramatta, Western Sydney, it was found that some Aboriginal peoples used charcoal, stone tools and possible ancient campfires. Near Penrith, a far western suburb of Sydney, numerous Aboriginal stone tools were found in Cranebrook Terraces gravel sediments having dates of 45,000 to 50,000 years BP. This would mean that there was human settlement in Sydney earlier than thought.

Archaeological evidence indicates human habitation at the upper Swan River, Western Australia by about 40,000 years ago. A 2018 study using archaeobotany dated evidence of human habitation at Karnatukul (Serpent's Glen) in the Carnarvon Range in the Little Sandy Desert in WA at around 50,000 years (20,000 years earlier than previously thought), and it was shown that human habitation had been continuous at the site since then.

Tasmania, which was connected to the continent by a land bridge, was inhabited at least 40,000 years ago. The oldest known site is Wareen Cave, dated to this time.

=== Migration routes and waves ===
A 2021 study by researchers at the Australian Research Council Centre of Excellence for Australian Biodiversity and Heritage has mapped the likely migration routes of the peoples as they moved across the Australian continent to its southern reaches of what is now Tasmania, but back then part of the mainland. The modelling is based on data from archaeologists, anthropologists, ecologists, geneticists, climatologists, geomorphologists, and hydrologists, and it is intended to compare the modelling with the oral histories of Aboriginal peoples, including Dreaming stories, as well as Australian rock art and linguistic features of the many Aboriginal languages. The routes, dubbed "superhighways" by the authors, are similar to current highways and stock routes in Australia. Lynette Russell of Monash University sees the new model as a starting point for collaboration with Aboriginal people to help uncover their history. The new models suggest that the first people may have first landed in the Kimberley region in what is now Western Australia about 60,000 years ago, and had settled across the continent within 6,000 years.

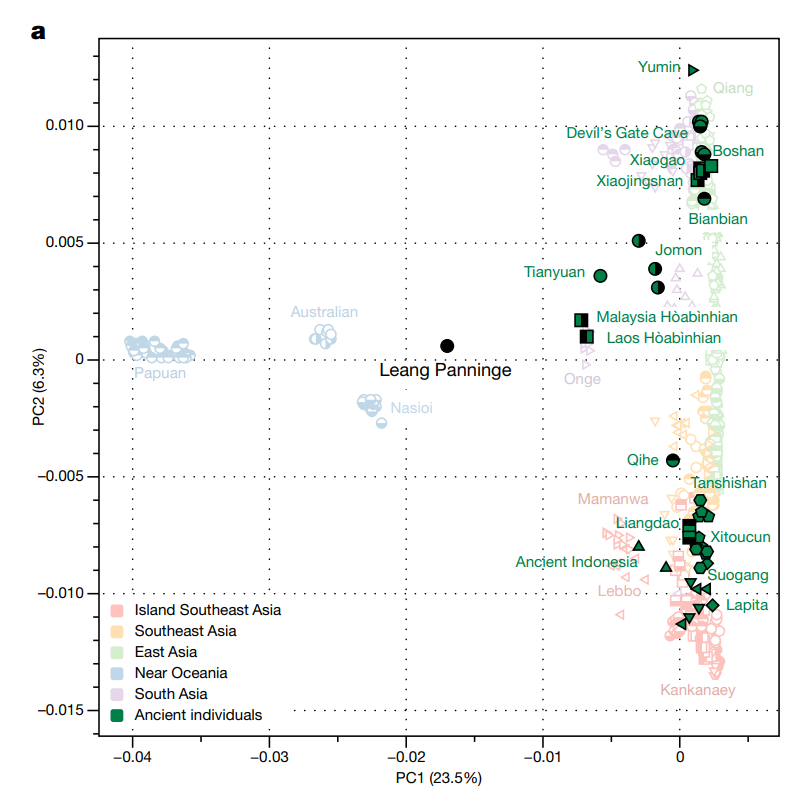
PCA calculated on present-day and ancient individuals from eastern Eurasia and Oceania. PC1 (23,8%) distinguish East-Eurasians and Australo-Melanesians, while PC2 (6,3%) differentiates East-Eurasians along a North to South cline.

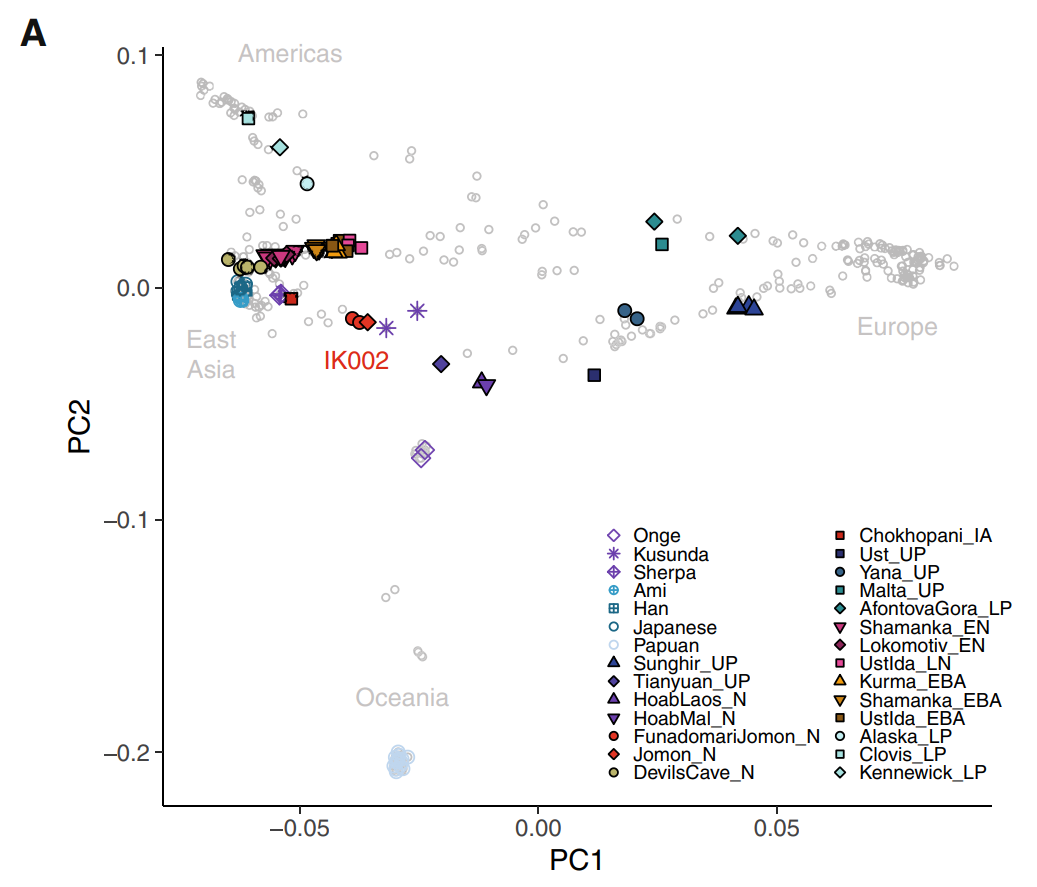
Principal component analysis (PCA) of ancient and modern day individuals from worldwide populations. Oceanians (Aboriginal Australians and Papuans) are most differentiated from both East-Eurasians and West-Eurasians.

Archeological evidence indicates that the ancestors of today's Aboriginal Australians first migrated to the continent 50,000 to 65,000 years ago. Genomic studies suggest that the peopling of Australia happened between 43,000 and 60,000 years ago.

DNA studies have suggested that the ancestors of Aboriginal Australians belonged to the southern route dispersal following the "out of Africa" exit, which expanded into the South and Southeast Asia region and subsequently diverged rapidly into the ancestors of Ancient Ancestral South Indians (AASI), Andamanese, East Asians, other Australasians, such as Papuans.

It is unknown how many populations settled in Australia prior to European colonisation. Both "trihybrid" and single-origin hypotheses have received extensive discussion. Keith Windschuttle, known for his belief that Aboriginal pre-history has become politicised, argues that the assumption of a single origin is tied into ethnic solidarity, and multiple entry was suppressed because it could be used to justify white seizure of Aboriginal lands, but this hypothesis is not supported by scientific studies.

=== Changes c. 4000 years ago ===
Human genomic differences are being studied to find possible answers, but there is still insufficient evidence to distinguish a "wave invasion model" from a "single settlement" one.

A 2012 paper by Alan J. Redd et al. on the topic of migration from India around 4,000 years ago notes that the indicated influx period corresponds to the timing of various other changes, specifically mentioning "The divergence times reported here correspond with a series of changes in the Australian anthropological record between 5,000 years ago and 3,000 years ago, including the introduction of the dingo; the spread of the Australian Small Tool tradition; the appearance of plant-processing technologies, especially complex detoxification of cycads; and the expansion of the Pama-Nyungan language over seven-eighths of Australia". Although previously linked to the pariah dogs of India, recent testing of the mitochondrial DNA of dingoes shows a closer connection to the dogs of Eastern Asia and North America, suggesting an introduction as a result of the Austronesian expansion from Southern China to Timor over the last 5,000 years. A 2007 finding of kangaroo ticks on the pariah dogs of Thailand suggested that this genetic expansion may have been a two-way process.

The dingo reached Australia about 4,000 years ago, and around the same time there were changes in language, with the Pama-Nyungan language family spreading over most of the mainland, and stone tool technology, with the use of smaller tools. Human contact has thus been inferred, and genetic data of two kinds have been proposed to support a gene flow from India to Australia: firstly, signs of South Asian components in Aboriginal Australian genomes, reported on the basis of genome-wide SNP data; and secondly, the existence of a Y chromosome (male) lineage, designated haplogroup C∗, with the most recent common ancestor around 5,000 years ago. The first type of evidence comes from a 2013 study by the Max Planck Institute for Evolutionary Anthropology using large-scale genotyping data from a pool of Aboriginal Australians, New Guineans, island Southeast Asians and Indians. It found that the New Guinea and Mamanwa (Philippines area) groups diverged from the Aboriginal about 36,000 years ago (and supporting evidence that these populations are descended from migrants taking an early "southern route" out of Africa, before other groups in the area), and also that the Indian and Australian populations mixed well before European contact, with this gene flow occurring during the Holocene (c. 4,230 years ago). The researchers had two theories for this: either some Indians had contact with people in Indonesia who eventually transferred those genes from India to Aboriginal Australians, or that a group of Indians migrated all the way from India to Australia and intermingled with the locals directly.

However, a 2016 study in Current Biology by Anders Bergström et al. excluded the Y chromosome as providing evidence for recent gene flow from India into Australia. The study authors sequenced 13 Aboriginal Australian Y chromosomes using recent advances in gene sequencing technology, investigating their divergence times from Y chromosomes in other continents, including comparing the haplogroup C chromosomes. The authors concluded that, although the results do not disprove the presence of any Holocene gene flow or non-genetic influences from South Asia at that time, and the appearance of the dingo does provide strong evidence for foreign arrivals, the evidence overall is consistent with a complete lack of gene flow, and points to indigenous origins for the technological and linguistic changes. Gene flow across the island-dotted 150-kilometre (93 mi)-wide Torres Strait is plausible and while Y chromosome divergence times are consistent with a lack of gene flow across the Strait since its formation due to rising sea levels, the authors assert that the Torres Strait Islander ancestry of the men from which the times were derived means external contact occurred more recently. It could not be determined from the study when within the last 10,000 years this may have occurred – newer analytical techniques have the potential to address such questions.

== Advent of fire farming and megafauna extinctions ==
Archaeological evidence from ash deposits in the Coral Sea indicates that fire was already a significant part of the Australian landscape over 100,000 years BP. There is evidence of the deliberate use of fire to shape the Australian environment 46,000 years ago. One explanation being the use by hunter-gatherers as a tool to drive game, to produce a green flush of new growth to attract animals, and to open up impenetrable forest. In The Biggest Estate on Earth: How Aborigines made Australia, Bill Gammage claims that dense forest became more open sclerophyll forest, open forest became grassland and fire-tolerant species became more predominant: in particular, eucalyptus, acacia, banksia, casuarina and grasses.

The shoreline of Tasmania and Victoria about 14,000 years ago, as sea levels were rising, showing some of the human archaeological sites

The changes to the fauna were even more dramatic: the megafauna, species significantly larger than humans, disappeared, and many of the smaller species disappeared too. All told, about 60 different vertebrates became extinct, including the genus Diprotodon (very large marsupial herbivores that looked rather like hippos), several large flightless birds, carnivorous kangaroos, Wonambi naracoortensis, a five-metre snake, a five-metre lizard and Meiolania.

The direct cause of the mass extinctions is uncertain: it may have been fire, hunting, climate change or a combination of all or any of these factors. The degree of human agency in these extinctions is still a matter of discussion. With no large herbivores to keep the understorey vegetation down and rapidly recycle soil nutrients with their dung, fuel build-up became more rapid and fires burned hotter, further changing the landscape. Against this theory is the evidence that in fact careful seasonal fires from Aboriginal land management practices reduced fuel loads, and prevented wildfires like those seen since European colonisation.

The Aboriginal population was confronted with significant changes to climate and environment. About 30,000 years ago, sea levels began to fall, temperatures in the south-east of the continent dropped by as much as 9 degrees Celsius, and the interior of Australia became more arid. About 20,000 years ago, New Guinea and Tasmania were connected to the Australian continent, which was more than a quarter larger than today.

About 19,000 years ago temperatures and sea levels began to rise. Tasmania became separated from the mainland some 14,000 years ago, and between 8,000 and 6,000 years ago thousands of islands in the Torres Strait and around the coast of Australia were formed. Josephine Flood writes that the flooding and loss of land as coastlines receded might have led to greater emphasis on territorial boundaries separating groups, stronger clan identity, and the development of the Rainbow Serpent and other mythologies.

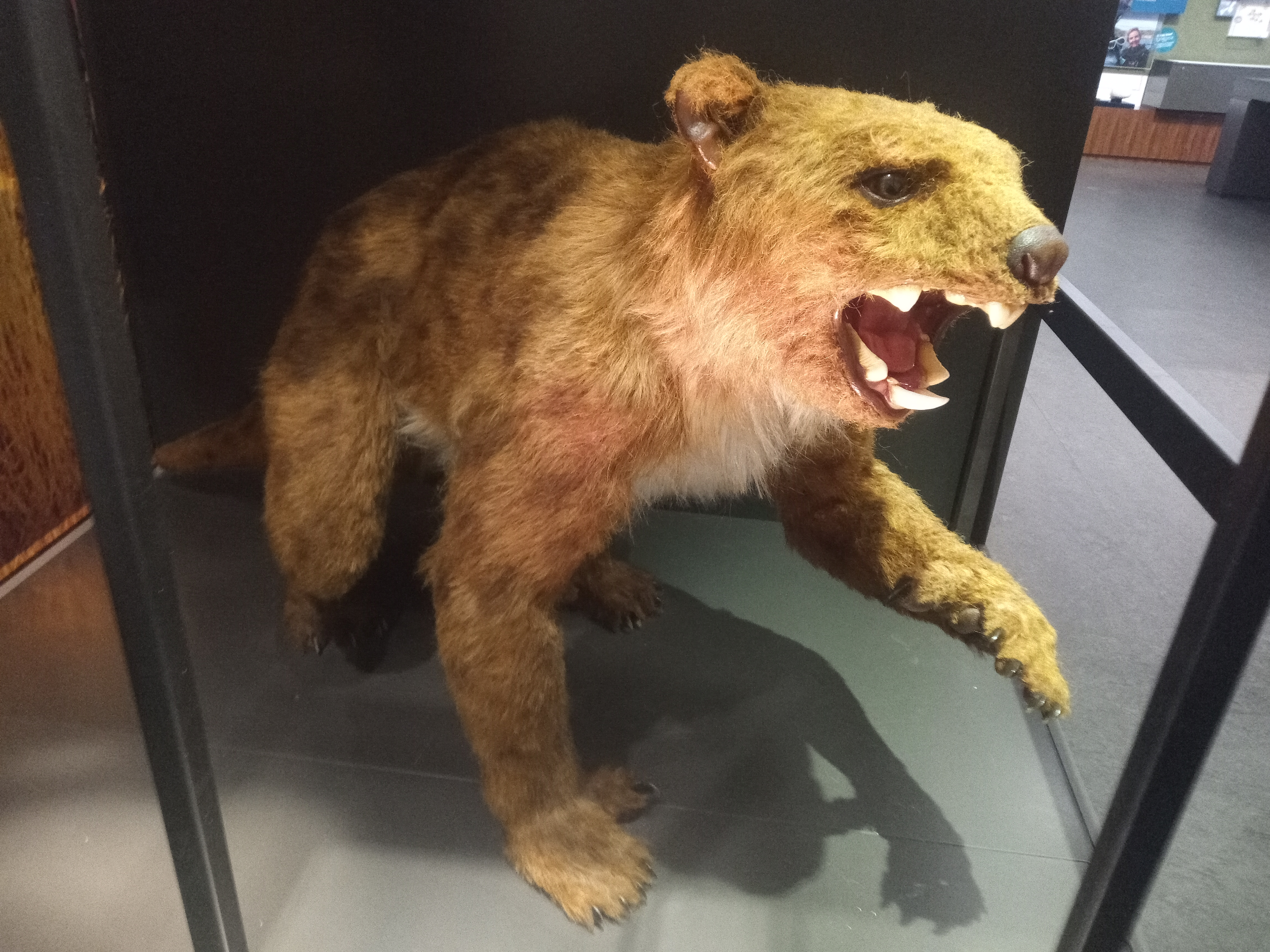
A museum model of Thylacoleo carnifex, a jaguar-sized apex predator and member of the Australian megafauna encountered by the first Indigenous Australian settlers.

The warmer climate was associated with new technologies. Small back-bladed stone tools appeared 15–19 thousand years ago. Wooden javelins and boomerangs have been found dating from 10,000 years ago. Stone points for spears have been found dating from 5–7 thousand years ago. Spear throwers were probably developed more recently than 6,500 years ago.

Sea levels stabilised at around their current level about 6,500 years ago. Warmer weather, wetter conditions and the new coastlines led to significant changes in Aboriginal social and economic organisation. New coastal societies emerged around tidal reefs, estuaries and flooded river valleys, and coastal islands were incorporated into local economies. There was a proliferation of stone tool, plant processing and landscape modification technologies. Elaborate fish and eel traps involving channels up to three kilometres long were in use in western Victoria from about 6,500 years ago. Semi-permanent collections of wooden huts on mounds also appeared in western Victoria, associated with a more systematic exploitation of new food sources in the wetlands.

Aboriginal Tasmanians were isolated from the mainland from about 14,000 years ago. As a result, they only possessed one quarter of the tools and equipment of the adjacent mainland and were without hafted axes, grinding technology, stone tipped weapons, spear throwers and the boomerang. By 3,700 BP they had ceased to eat fish and use bone tools. Coastal Tasmanians switched from fish to abalone and crayfish and more Tasmanians moved to the interior. The Tasmanians built watercraft from reeds and bark and journeyed up to 10 kilometres offshore to visit islands and hunt for seals and muttonbirds.

== Culture and technology ==
Around 4,000 years ago the first phase of occupation of the Torres Strait Islands began. By 2,500 years ago more of the islands were occupied and a distinctive Torres Strait Island maritime culture emerged. Agriculture also developed on some islands and by 700 years ago villages appeared.

On the Australian mainland, some innovations were imported from neighbouring cultures. The dingo was introduced about 4,000 years ago. Shell fish hooks appeared in Australia about 1,200 years ago and were probably introduced from the Torres Strait or by Polynesian seafarers. From the mid-1660s fishing vessels from Indonesia regularly visited the north coast of Australia in search of trepang (sea cucumber). Trade and social relationships developed which were reflected in Aboriginal art, ceremonies and oral traditions. Aboriginal people adopted dugout canoes and metal harpoon heads from the Indonesians which allowed them to better hunt dugong and turtle off the coast and nearby islands.

Despite these interactions with neighbouring cultures, the basic structure of Aboriginal society was unchanged. Family groups were joined in bands and clans averaging about 25 people, each with a defined territory for foraging. Clans were attached to tribes or nations, associated with particular languages and country. At the time of European contact there were about 600 tribes or nations and 250 distinct languages with various dialects.

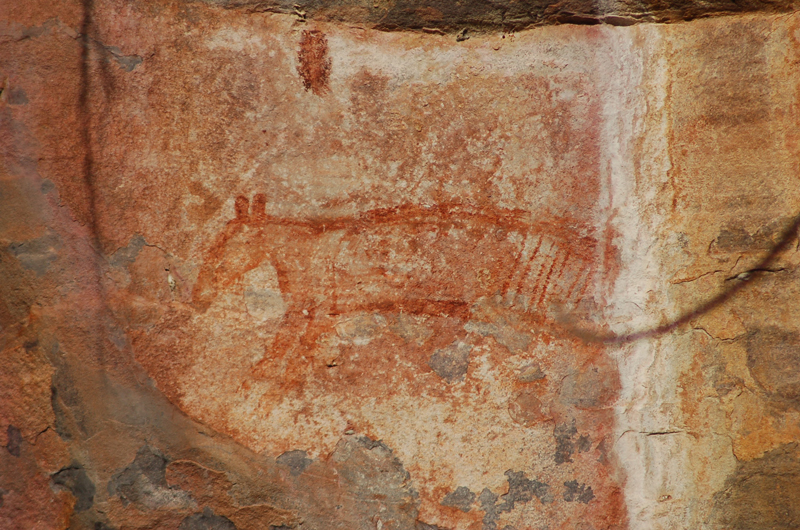
Aboriginal rock art depicting a thylacine on the Ubirr rock formation, Northern Territory

Aboriginal society was egalitarian with no formal government or chiefs. Authority rested with elders who held extensive ritual knowledge gained over many years. Group decisions were generally made through the consensus of elders. The traditional economy was cooperative, with males generally hunting large game while females gathered local staples such as small animals, shellfish, vegetables, fruits, seeds and nuts. Food was shared within groups and exchanged across groups.

Aboriginal groups were semi-nomadic, generally ranging over a specific territory defined by natural features. Members of a group would enter the territory of another group through rights established by marriage and kinship or by invitation for specific purposes such as ceremonies and sharing abundant seasonal foods. As all natural features of the land were created by ancestral beings, a group's particular country provided physical and spiritual nourishment.

According to Australian Aboriginal mythology and the animist framework developed in Aboriginal Australia, the Dreaming is a sacred era in which ancestral totemic spirit beings formed The Creation. The Dreaming established the laws and structures of society and the ceremonies performed to ensure continuity of life and land.

The extent to which some Aboriginal societies were agricultural is controversial. In the Lake Condah region of western Victoria the inhabitants built elaborate eel and fish traps and hundreds gathered in semi-permanent stone and bark huts during the eel season. However, these groups still moved across their territory several times a year to exploit other seasonal food sources. In semi-arid areas, millet was harvested, stacked and threshed and the seeds stored for later use. In tropical areas the tops of yams were replanted. Flood argues that such practices are better classified as resource management than agriculture and that Aboriginal societies did not develop the systematic cultivation of crops or permanent villages such as existed in the Torres Strait Islands. Elizabeth Williams has called the inhabitants of the more settled regions of the Murray valley "complex hunter gatherers".

Behaviour was governed by strict rules regarding responsibilities to and from uncles, aunts, brothers and sisters as well as in-laws. The kinship systems observed by many communities included a division into moieties, with restrictions on intermarrying dictated by the moiety an individual belonged to.

Male initiation usually occurred at puberty and the rites often included penile subincision, depilation or tooth avulsion. Female initiation often involved purification through smoke or bathing, and sometimes scarification or the removal of finger joints.

Abortion and infanticide were widely practised as a means of birth control or dealing with deformities, injuries or illness which might impair the functioning of the group. Some Aboriginal and Torres Strait Islander groups practised ritual cannibalism in rare circumstances, notably mortuary cannibalism. There is no credible evidence that the gustatory cannibalism described by colonists was practised.

Describing prehistoric Aboriginal culture and society during her 1999 Boyer Lecture, Australian historian and anthropologist Inga Clendinnen explained:

They [...] developed steepling thought-structures – intellectual edifices so comprehensive that every creature and plant had its place within it. They travelled light, but they were walking atlases, and walking encyclopedias of natural history. [...] Detailed observations of nature were elevated into drama by the development of multiple and multi-level narratives: narratives which made the intricate relationships between these observed phenomena memorable. These dramatic narratives identified the recurrent and therefore the timeless and the significant within the fleeting and the idiosyncratic. They were also very human, charged with moral significance but with pathos, and with humour, too – after all, the Dreamtime creatures were not austere divinities, but fallible beings who happened to make the world and everything in it while going about their creaturely business. Traditional Aboriginal culture effortlessly fuses areas of understanding which Europeans 'naturally' keep separate: ecology, cosmology, theology, social morality, art, comedy, tragedy – the observed and the richly imagined fused into a seamless whole.

Archaeological evidence indicates that interpersonal violence occurred in some Indigenous Australian societies prior to European colonization. Skeletal remains from several regions show traumatic injuries, including cranial fractures and embedded stone or bone weapon points, some of which were likely fatal. Analysis of the prehistoric burial population at Roonka Flat on the lower Murray River also found relatively low survival into older age, with only 5.8% of individuals estimated to have lived beyond 50 years of age and 26% dying between the ages of 31 and 50.

== Contact outside Australia ==
Aboriginal people have no cultural memory of living anywhere outside Australia. Nevertheless, the people living along the northern coastline of Australia, in the Kimberley, Arnhem Land, Gulf of Carpentaria and Cape York had encounters with various visitors for many thousands of years. People and traded goods moved freely between Australia and New Guinea up to and even after the eventual flooding of the land bridge by rising sea levels, which was completed about 8,000 years ago.

However, trade and intercourse between the separated lands continued across the newly formed Torres Strait, whose 150 km-wide channel remained readily navigable with the chain of Torres Strait Islands and reefs affording intermediary stopping points. The islands were settled by different seafaring Melanesian cultures such as the Torres Strait Islanders over 2500 years ago, and cultural interactions continued via this route with the Aboriginal people of northeast Australia.

Indonesian "Bajau" fishermen from the Spice Islands (e.g. Banda) have fished off the coast of Australia for hundreds of years. Macassan traders from Sulawesi regularly visited the coast of northern Australia to fish for trepang, an edible sea cucumber to trade with the Chinese since at least the early 18th century.

There was a high degree of cultural exchange, evidenced in Aboriginal rock and bark paintings, the introduction of technologies such as dug-out canoes and items such as tobacco and tobacco pipes, Macassan words in Aboriginal languages (e.g. Balanda for white person), and descendants of Malay people in Australian Aboriginal communities and vice versa, as a result of intermarriage and migration.

The myths of the people of Arnhem Land have preserved accounts of the trepang-catching, rice-growing Baijini people, who, according to the myths, were in Australia in the earliest times, before the Macassans. The Baijini have been variously interpreted by modern researchers as a different group of presumably South East Asian people, such as Bajau visitors to Australia who may have visited Arnhem Land before the Macassans, as a mythological reflection of the experiences of some Yolŋu people who have travelled to Sulawesi with the Macassans and came back, or, in more fringe views, even as visitors from China.

== See also ==
- Australian Aboriginal sacred site
- Australian archaeology
- Cannibalism in Oceania
- Dreamtime, Aboriginal mythology about Australian prehistory
- European maritime exploration of Australia
- Juukan Gorge caves, destroyed in May 2020
- Lake Mungo remains
- Ten Canoes, a 2006 film about Australian prehistory
