= Spinifex people =

Aboriginal Australian people of Western Australia

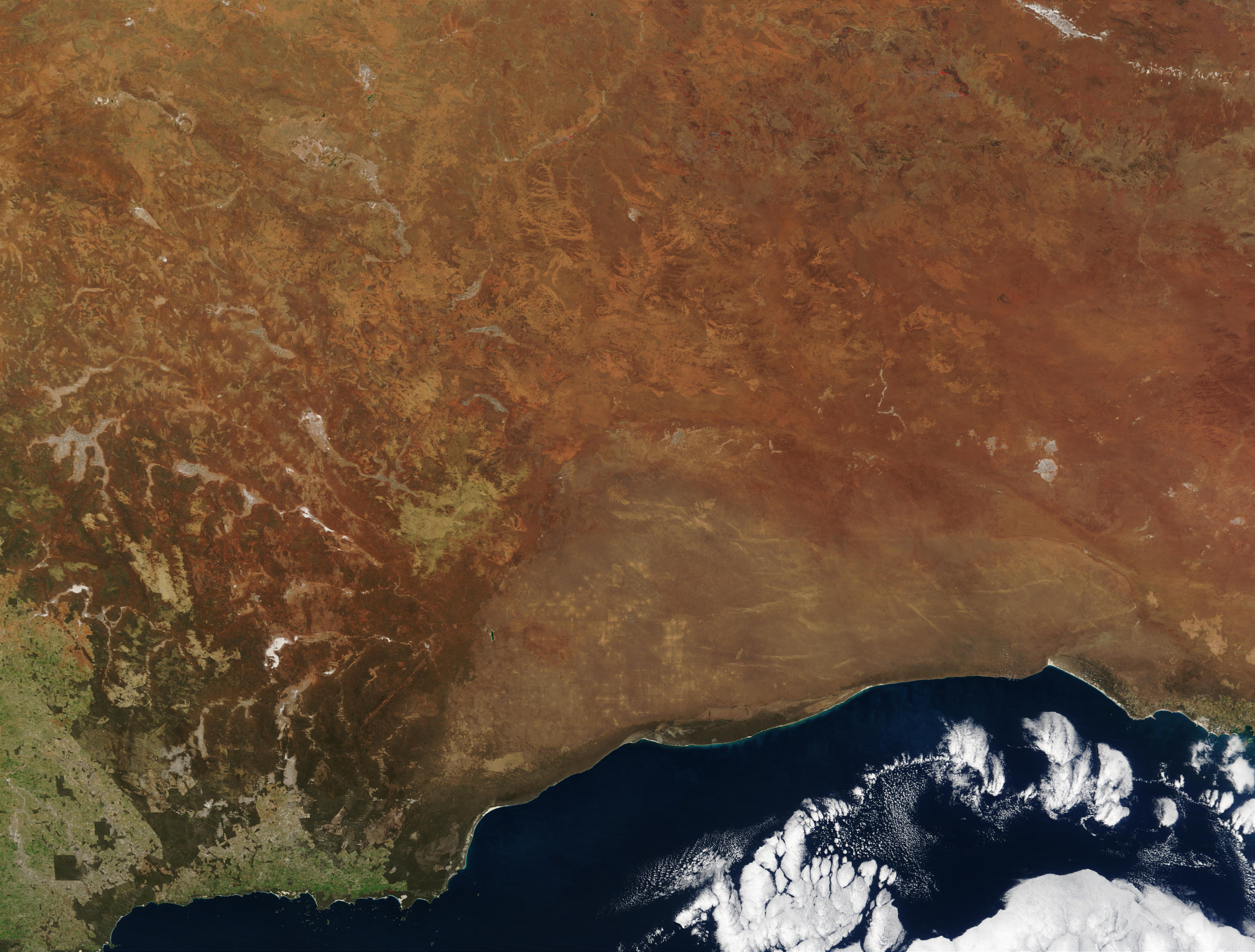
The vast and harsh Nullarbor Plain, as seen from space. Courtesy NASA.

The Pila Nguru, often referred to as the Spinifex people, are an Aboriginal Australian people of Western Australia, whose lands extend to the border with South Australia and to the north of the Nullarbor Plain. The centre of their homeland is in the Great Victoria Desert, at Tjuntjuntjara, some 700 kilometres (430 mi) east of Kalgoorlie, perhaps the remotest community in Australia. Their country is sometimes referred to as Spinifex country.

In 1997, an art project was started in which Indigenous paintings became part of the title claim. In 2005, a major exhibit of their works in London brought the artists widespread attention.

== Language ==
Spinifex people speak a dialect of the Western Desert language of the Pama–Nyungan family. The name Pila Nguru is an abbreviation of Anaṉgu tjuta pila nguru ("people-land-spinifex-from", or people from the land of the spinifex) and reflects an identity rooted in a sense of tenure of territory rather than a strictly linguistic classification.

== Ecology and lifestyle ==
The arid desert which forms the environment where the Pila Nguru live has tree varieties like mulga, western myall and casuarina as well as varieties of cassia, sandalwood and spinifex. Spinifex grasses (porcupine/hummock grasses) dominated communities over 22% of the traditional Australian landmass, and the arid desert areas contain some 35 species. The variety called "soft spinifex" or in pidgin English, bush araldite, is Triodia pungens, prized for its cementing qualities. The general term in Western desert languages for the plant is tjanpi, the plain where it grows is pila, the plant itself, in the Pitjantjatjara and Yankunytjatjara languages was tjapura, while the Spinifex resin extracted from it is called kiti.

Spinifex grasses were worked to produce cakes of resin that had four basic uses: (a) as a waterproofer, by caulking any wooden object employed for carry around water; (b) as a putty to fill holes or fissures in work materials; (c) as an adhesive to bind materials when making tools, weaponry and ceremonial objects; and (d) as a basic stuff for moulding beads, figurines and other assorted objects. These resin products are commodities also, used as gifts and as important tradewares between tribes.

The grasses were cut with stone halfway down the stem. The gathered grass was flailed with a stick to obtain spinifex dust, which then was winnowed and "yandied", yandi referring to a luandja, a softwood winnowing dish for grass seed: the cleaned seeds were then tipped into another type of dish, called ivirra, worked further with a particular rocking movement and shaking and then heated over stone to yield around 8 cubic metres yielding 600 grams.

The resin, thus extracted from varieties of triodia was a key ingredient for binding the stone blades to native hafted adzes, which were of two types, tula and burren, the former, the type used by spinifex people, using the distal edge, the other the lateral edge, for working materials. The materials for the tula adze were obtained by knapping tula flakes to form "slugs" or blades, the tool being then employed for woodwork, to hollow out yandis or fashion boomerangs and spears.

The only artificial dwelling was a wiltja or windbreak.

== History ==
In evaluating the Pila Nguru claim to native title in 2001, the Federal Court of Australia's Chief Justice Michael Black stated that archaeological evidence indicated a nomadic presence in the Western desert dating back some 20,000 years. There was rapid demographic expansion over most of Australia during the Holocene climatic optimum (9,000–6,000, extending through much of the arid zones. According to Scott Cane the residual debris of artifact use peppering the desert landscape is extremely dense, attesting to a very long period of habitation.

=== History of contact with whites: 1900–1952 ===
White incursions into the Pila Nguru homelands started around the 1910s, with the granting of options on pastoral leases, which however failed to be realised. By the 1930s, profiting from the proximity of the Trans-Australian Railway (T.A.R), which had been completed just over a decade earlier, missionaries strove to undertake evangelistic pastoral work in the area, establishing a mission in Warburton but the extremities of trying to live there rendered their activities difficult, and the native lifestyle managed to survive, with the retention of many customary ways. In times of drought during the 1920s down to 1942, itinerant Anangu sought out provisions from the Karonie T.A.R on the Cowarna Downs, where the government had established a rations depot, with food distributed on a monthly basis. It was gradually overtaken by the depot at Cundeelee from 1939, which was closed in 1942. Two other depots distributing rations to those in need existed: one at Zanthus T.A.R, the other halfway between Cundeelee and Queen Victoria Springs.

By the 1950s, so little was known about these people that the British chose the Nullarbor for nuclear weapons testing, as they believed it to be devoid of people.

=== Atomic testing, 1953–1957 ===
When graded roads were built for the Giles Weather Station (part of the Weapons Research Establishment) during 1952–1955, officials learned that Aboriginal people – probably then around 150 – lived west of the sites. Scouting just east of this area to find suitable locations for radiation sensors that would measure the fallout, Len Beadell records stumbling on an "Aboriginal Stonehenge", a geometrical pattern of upturned shale slabs extending for a distance of 60 metres (200 ft). An officer, the expert bushman Walter MacDougall was sent to warn them of the impending tests. A total of nine small nuclear weapons ranging up to 25 kilotons were tested at Emu Junction (2 tests, 1953) and Maralinga (7 tests, 1956–1957). Given that only one officer and an assistant were assigned to warn the Spinifex people who lived across an enormous area far to the west of the test sites, many of the Spinifex were never informed, nor did they leave the area. Officially, all were forced to leave their lands and were not allowed within 200 km of ground zero. Officials made a leaflet drop, but the Spinifex could not read the leaflets and were wary and afraid of the aircraft.

In the later stages of the bomb trials, MacDougall discovered that up to 40 Spinifex people may have been hunting over the eastern portion of the prohibited Maralinga area while the tests were being conducted, moving as far east as Vokes Hill and Waldana. One family of twelve were the nearest people, living at Nurrari Lakes less than 200 km west from Maralinga. Although close enough to hear the larger bombs explode, they were healthy several years after the tests.

The Australian Royal Commission was unable to determine if Maralinga Tjarutja or Pila Nguru people had been exposed to damaging levels of radiation from fallout, due to the lack of medical records and medical centres. Maralinga bomb plume maps show prevailing northerly winds during tests, whereas the Spinifex lands are 300 km to the west of Maralinga. The closest group was at Nurrari Lakes about 180 km west. Scott Cane's otherwise definitive native title study, Pila Nguru (2000), contained almost no details as to how bomb testing radiation affected the Spinifex people.

=== Native title ===
In 1997 the Spinifex Arts Project was begun to help document the native title claims. Both native title paintings, the men's combined and the women's combined, document the entire Spinifex area; they show the claimants' birthplaces and express the important traditional stories that cross and give shape to the area.

The Spinifex people were the second group in Western Australia to receive recognition of their land rights in 2000, in accordance with Section 87 (agreement) of the Commonwealth Native Title Act 1993. The ruling, by the Federal Court of Australia, in a case brought by a third party on behalf of the Spinifex people, found that agreement had been reached between the applicants and the two named respondents: the State Government of Western Australia and the Shire of Laverton, over a sector of land encompassing around 55,000 km^{2} (21,000 sq mi).

This territory – which was designated as either unallocated land or park reserve, and contained no pastoral leases – lies to the north of the lands of the Nullarbor peoples, to the east of the people in the Pilki area and to the south of the Ngaanyatjarra Lands, the eastern boundary being formed by the South Australian border. Apart from the area of two nature reserves, the only specific "other interests" identified within the territory was for public right-of-way along an existing road which traversed some of the territory.

The native title claim was made by twenty-one families constituting the current Spinifex people. Some people of the Spinifex had begun returning to their land from around 1980. From 2001 many of those who left to live at the Christian missions have since returned to their homelands and the Unnamed Conservation Park Biosphere Reserve (now Mamungari Conservation Park). In 2004 the government turned over the pristine wilderness area of 21,000 km^{2} (8,100 sq mi) jointly to the Pila Nguru and the Maralinga Tjarutja.

== Art ==
Spinifex art began as what Philip Batty called "intercultural debris", reflecting their experience of the impact of the outside world. The genre of what the Pila Nguru call "government paintings" were visual documents created to furnish evidence of their land title, to be produced in court.

In early 2005, the Spinifex people became famous for their solo and group artworks, due to the effect of a major art exhibition of their work in London. Their boldly-coloured "dot paintings" are not the usual polished commodities produced by many northern tribes for sale to a non-Aboriginal art market, but are authentic works that the Spinifex People have made for their own purposes.

The Spinifex Arts Project is a non-profit Aboriginal-owned art centre on Spinifex Country at Tjuntjuntjara Community. It is a member of Desart.

=== Stage productions ===
A theatrical performance, The Career Highlights of the Mamu, covering the tribal experience during the period of the atomic tests, co-written by Big hART's creative director Scott Rankin and Trevor Jamieson, was performed by Roy Underwood and several other Spinifex people in a Black Swan Theatre Company production in Hamburg, Germany in 2002.

Ngapartji Ngapartji was a community and language revitalisation project as well as a stage production, developed from 2008 onwards by Rankin and Jamieson. In the production, Jamieson narrates his family's story.

== See also ==
- Indigenous Australians
- Mamungari Conservation Park

== Sources ==
- "AIATSIS map of Indigenous Australia". AIATSIS. 9 September 2021.
- Aiken, Kirsten (15 May 2005). "Nomads' art wins praise in London". ABC News.
- Cane, Scott (2002). Pila Nguru: The Spinifex People. Fremantle Art Centre Press. ISBN 978-1-863-68348-7.
- Cane, Scott (2013). "Australian Aboriginal Subsistence in the Western Desert". In Bates, Daniel G.; Lees, Sarah H. (eds.). Case Studies in Human Ecology. Springer. pp. 17–53. ISBN 978-1-475-79584-4.
- Casey, Maryrose (2009). "Ngapartji Ngapartji: Telling Aboriginal Australian Stories". In Forsyth, Alison; Megson, Chris (eds.). Get Real: Documentary Theatre Past and Present. Palgrave Macmillan. pp. 122–138. ISBN 978-0-230-23694-3.
- Castillo, Greg (2015). "Spinifex People as Cold War Moderns". Contemporaneity. 4 (1): 72–94. doi:10.5195/contemp.2015.144.
- Chester, Quentin (14 August 2013). "People of the Great Victoria Desert, WA". Australian Geographic. No. 116.
- Clarke, Philip A. (2014). Discovering Aboriginal Plant Use: The Journeys of an Australian Anthropologist. Rosenberg Publishing. ISBN 978-1-925-07836-7.
- Doelman, Trudy; Cochrane, Grant W. G. (2012). "Design Theory and the Australian Tula Adze" (PDF). Asian Perspectives. 51 (2): 251–277. doi:10.1353/asi.2014.0004. hdl:10125/36668. S2CID 161549193.
- "History of the Spinifex People". Tjuntjuntjara Community. Paupiyala Tjarutja Aboriginal Corporation.
- Leitner, Gerhard (2007). "The Aboriginal contribution to Australia's language habitat". In Leitner, Gerhard; Malcolm, Ian G. (eds.). The Habitat of Australia's Aboriginal Languages: Past, Present and Future. Walter de Gruyter. pp. 197–235. ISBN 978-3-110-19784-6.
- Lomholt, Isabelle (9 March 2016). "Community Building in the Great Victoria Desert". e-architect.
- Loxley, Anne (3 August 2002). "Pila Nguru: The Spinifex People". The Sydney Morning Herald.
- Middleton, Nick (2009). Deserts: A Very Short Introduction. Oxford University Press. ISBN 978-0-199-56430-9.
- Pila Nguru: art and song from the Spinifex people. Kalgoorlie: Paupiyala Tjarutja Aboriginal Corporation. 1999. ISBN 978-0-646-38826-7.
- Pitman, Heidi T. (2016) [First published 2015]. "A Cake of Spinifex Resin". In Brown, Steve; Clarke, Anne; Frederick, Ursula (eds.). Object Stories: Artifacts and Archaeologists. Routledge. pp. 93–102. ISBN 978-1-315-42336-4.
- Powell, Owen; Fensham, Roderick J.; Memmott, Paul (2013). "Indigenous Use of Spinifex Resin for Hafting in North-Eastern Australia". Economic Botany. 67 (3): 210–224. doi:10.1007/s12231-013-9238-3. S2CID 17541049.
- Scambary, Benedict (2013). My Country, Mine Country: Indigenous People, Mining and Development Contestation in remote Australia. Australian National University. ISBN 978-1-922-14473-7.
- Smith, Mike (2013). The Archaeology of Australia's Deserts. Cambridge University Press. ISBN 978-1-107-31053-7.
- "Spinifex Country". The Spinifex Arts Project website. 2010.
- Stephenson, Peta (2007). The Outsiders Within: Telling Australia's Indigenous-Asian Story. NSW Press. ISBN 978-0-868-40836-1.
- "Tindale Tribal Boundaries" (PDF). Department of Aboriginal Affairs, Western Australia. September 2016.
- Williams, Alan N.; Ulm, Sean; Turney, Chris S. M.; Rohde, David; White, Gentry (27 June 2015). "Holocene Demographic Changes and the Emergence of Complex Societies in Prehistoric Australia". PLOS ONE. 10 (6) e0128661. Bibcode:2015PLoSO..1028661W. doi:10.1371/journal.pone.0128661. PMC 4471166. PMID 26083101.
