= McClelland Royal Commission =

Australian government inquiry

Royal Commission into British nuclear tests in Australia
- Date: 16 July 1984 – 20 November 1985
- Duration: 1 year, 4 months
- Also known as: McClelland Royal Commission
- Type: Royal commission
- Commissioners: Jim McClelland; William Jonas; Jill Fitch
- Counsel assisting: Peter McClellan
- Outcome: Seven recommendations

The McClelland Royal Commission or Royal Commission into British nuclear tests in Australia was an inquiry by the Australian government in 1984–1985 to investigate the conduct of the British in its use, with the then Australian government's permission, of Australian territory and soldiers for testing nuclear weapons. It was chaired by Jim McClelland.

== Background ==
In September 1950, the then UK Prime Minister, Clement Attlee, requested via a secure telegraph, to Australia's Prime Minister Sir Robert Menzies, to conduct a series of atomic tests at the Monte Bello Islands off the coast of Western Australia. Over the next thirteen years, twelve major British nuclear tests would occur on Australian territory, along with thirty "minor" atomic trials testing sub-systems. The last Vixen B trial occurred in 1963 whereupon the United Kingdom moved its testing operations to the United States.

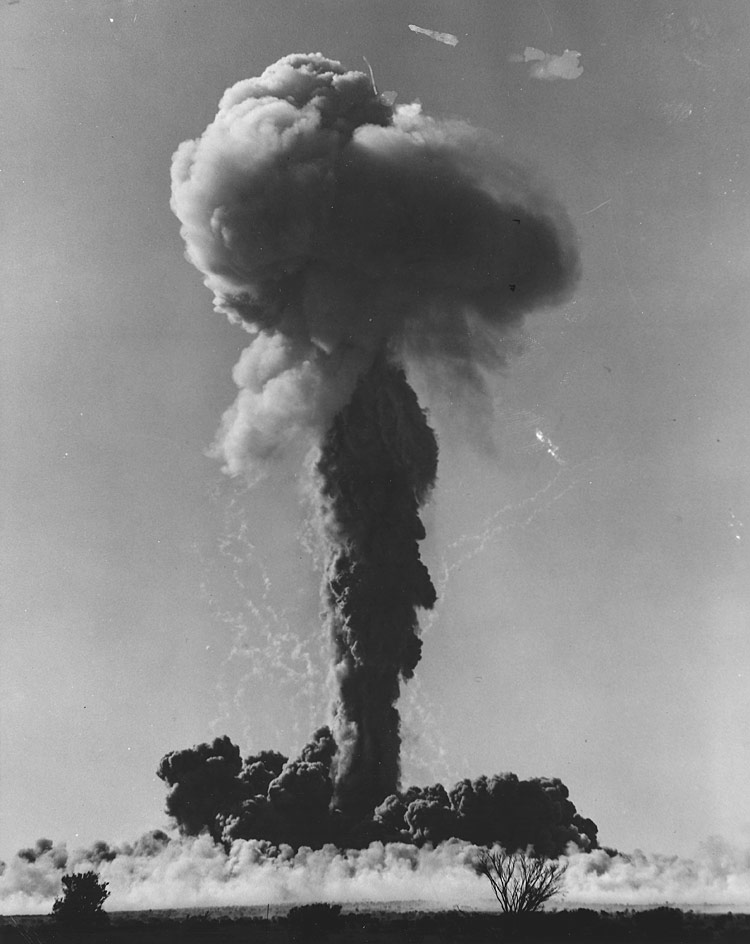
This image of British nuclear testing conducted at Maralinga in 1957 was submitted to the Royal Commission.

The Royal Commission into nuclear tests arose out of a public outcry, led by media reports, over the increasing evidence (and statistical significance) of premature deaths of former Australian staff associated with the atomic tests and subsequent birth defects of their off-springs. Likewise, remote indigenous communities downwind of the tests had statistically significant higher rates of radiation related diseases not generally found among indigenous communities to the same level. In light of the increasing evidence and public lobbying by concerned groups, the Hawke Labor Government established a Royal Commission to investigate the British atomic tests in Australia.

== Hearings ==
The Royal Commission was told that 30 badly leaking drums of radioactive waste were dumped off the West Australian coast. The Commission was also told that acting Prime Minister Arthur Fadden had sent a message to the British PM asking "What the bloody hell is going on, the cloud is drifting over the mainland?". A CSIRO scientist is making use of the thin blanket of radioactive caesium-137 laid over Australia from atmospheric nuclear tests to measure soil erosion.

The McClelland Royal Commission was told that one hundred Aboriginal people walked barefoot over nuclear-contaminated ground because boots they had been given didn't fit. The 1953 British nuclear test that allegedly caused 'black mist' phenomenon in South Australia should not have been fired and the fallout was about three times more than forecast, according to a scientist who was involved in the tests.

A house built less than 200 metres from an area mined for mineral sands 25 years ago is still contaminated from mineral-sands tailings which are dangerously radioactive. According to a special report on an investigation of residual radio-active contamination, about 100,000 dangerous metal fragments contaminated with plutonium still litter the Maralinga atomic test range – 25 years after the atomic tests which caused them.

A miner has told the McClelland Royal Commission on British nuclear weapons tests in Australia, that geiger counter readings of the fallout levels near Marble Bar were "off-the-scale".

== Inquiry findings and conclusions ==
The McClelland Royal Commission found that:

- then Australian Prime Minister Sir Robert Menzies approved the British nuclear tests without first receiving independent Australian scientific advice on the hazards to humans or the environment.
- the Australia Federal Cabinet was kept in the dark by Menzies about key aspects of the nuclear tests.
- the atomic test agreement by the British and Australian governments was done in retrospect after the first test had occurred.
- Australia was forced to accept UK assurances on the safety and likely fallout lifespan hazards of the atomic tests, without an independent scientific assessment.
- Australia's key representative to oversee the atomic tests on behalf of Australia, Sir Ernest Titterton, was in fact an expatriate British person who withheld key information from the Australian Government.
- the safeguards against radiation exposure for the nuclear veterans were totally inadequate, even by the best practice standards of the 1950s.
- it is probable that the rate of cancers that occurred subsequent to the atomic tests in Australia would not have otherwise occurred were it not for the fallout from the tests.
- the Vixen tests on plutonium should have not occurred knowing the half-life and radiation hazard of plutonium even with 1950s knowledge of the hazards.
- failure to provide Australian air crews with protective equipment on over-flights or direct fly-throughs of the atomic mushroom clouds was clearly negligent.

== Controversy over findings and alleged bias ==
The report's approach and conclusions apparently differed from the British Government's official history, based on official British records, by Lorna Arnold. This report emphasized the partnership between the two nations, and noted that the approach taken towards safety was to international standards of the time and had contrasted with the historic disregard of Australian authorities toward the welfare of indigenous people. Some observers have noted that both reports were framed in the politics of the time: Britain wished to minimize its responsibility, while the Australian government of Bob Hawke wished to implicate their political opponents alongside the British, and have suggested that the timeline of the inquiry was chosen so as not to implicate earlier Labor governments. However, the Australian Labor Party had not been in power federally from 1950 until 1972, clearly undermining that argument. Likewise the Arnold report was criticised for being authored by a former employee of the United Kingdom Atomic Energy Authority (UKAEA), and for the author having never visited the test sites nor interviewed Australian participants who worked on the atomic tests. The Royal Commission witness statements of recounting discussions between Australian RAAF and USAF B-29 flight crews clearly demonstrate that the tests were not at then international standards in terms of testing instruments nor health and safety precautions for radiation. The Royal Commission heard ample evidence of British scientists being fully dressed in protective radiation suits that were not issued to Australian staff working in the same high-risk radiation zones. Overall the Arnold argument that the British nuclear tests were a partnership was not compatible with the documented facts that the British controlled and managed the tests and the Australians worked under direction from British atomic test leaders.

== In popular culture ==
The Royal Commission formed part of the plot of the film Ground Zero (1987), starring Colin Friels and Jack Thompson.

== See also ==
- List of inquiries into uranium mining in Australia
- Archie Barton
- British nuclear tests at Maralinga
- Downwinders
- Maralinga
- Maralinga: Australia's Nuclear Waste Cover-up
- Montebello Islands
- Operation Buffalo
- Operation Grapple
- Emu Field, South Australia
