= Mamungari Conservation Park =

Protected area in South Australia

- IUCN category Ia (strict nature reserve)
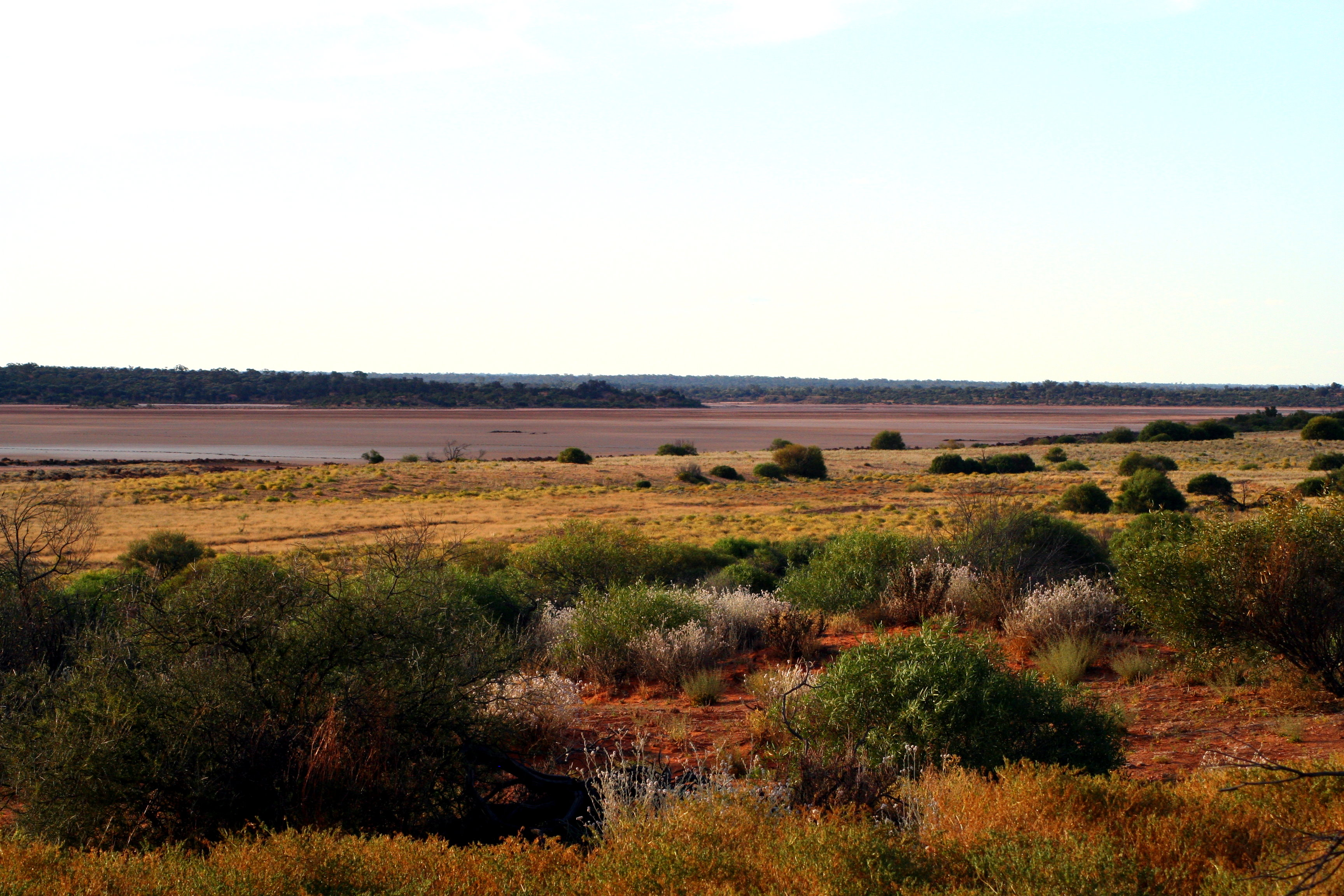
- Serpentine Lakes

- Location within South Australia
- Location: South Australia
- Nearest city: Eucla
- Coordinates: 29°8′26″S 129°15′8″E
- Area: 21,289.45 km^{2} (8,219.90 sq mi)
- Established: 7 May 1970
- Governing body: DEW; Maralinga Tjarutja Community
- Website: Official website

Mamungari Conservation Park (formerly known as Unnamed National Park, Unnamed Conservation Park and also known as the Unnamed Biosphere Reserve) is a protected area located in South Australia within the southern Great Victoria Desert and northern Nullarbor Plain about 200 kilometres (120 miles) west of Maralinga and 450 kilometres (280 miles) northwest of Ceduna. It is about 1,000 kilometres (620 mi) north-west of Adelaide and abuts the Western Australia border

== History ==
The conservation park was proclaimed in 1970 as a national park under the then National Parks Act 1966 for the purpose of conserving "the environments of the Great Victoria Desert and protect wilderness values". It was not assigned a name in 1970 and was subsequently constituted as the Unnamed Conservation Park under the National Parks and Wildlife Act 1972. It was renamed as Mamungari Conservation Park on 30 November 2006.

In May 2004, following the passage of special legislation, SA Premier Mike Rann fulfilled a pledge he had made to Maralinga leader Archie Barton as Aboriginal Affairs Minister in 1991, by handing back title to 21,000 square kilometres (8,100 mi^{2}) of land to the Maralinga Tjarutja and Pila Nguru people, including the conservation park and the Serpentine Lakes. This was the largest land return under native title in South Australia since Premier John Bannon's hand over of Maralinga lands in 1984.

== Conservation status ==
It is one of fourteen UNESCO World Biosphere Reserves in Australia and obtained this status in 1977 with the name of the Unnamed Biosphere Reserve.

The conservation park is classified as an IUCN Category Ia protected area. In 1980, it was listed on the now-defunct Register of the National Estate.

== Management and access ==
The conservation park is managed jointly by the traditional owners, the Maralinga Tjarutja and Pila Nguru people, and the Department for Environment and Water.

The conservation park may only be visited by those who have obtained the minimum impact code and can demonstrate experience using that code. Permits are required to travel to the conservation park and will take 4 to 6 weeks to arrange. The only road of significance that passes through the conservation park is the Anne Beadell Highway.

== See also ==
- Protected areas of South Australia
- List of biosphere reserves in Australia
- Serpentine Lakes
