= Ooldea, South Australia =

Ooldea
- Town
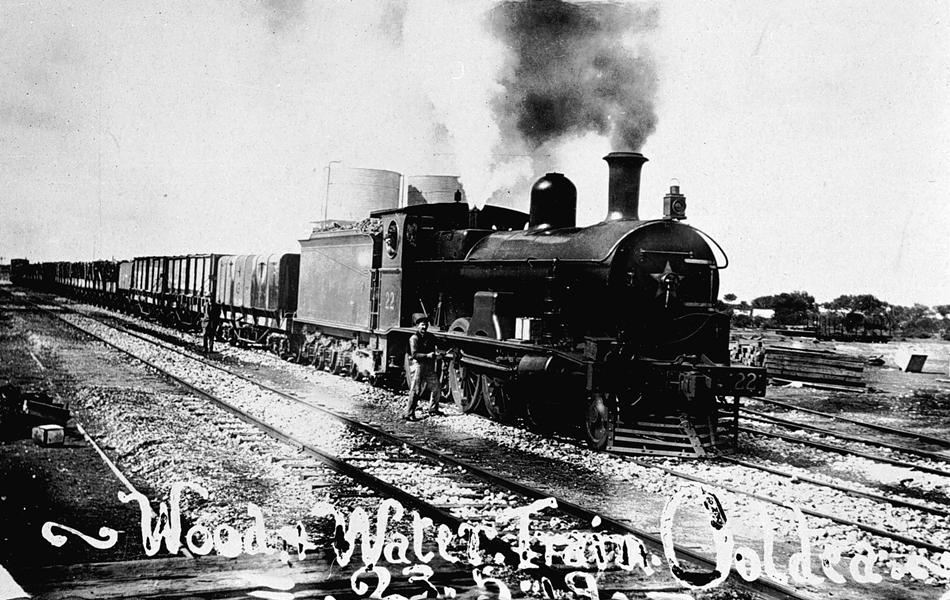
- A wood and water train in Ooldea, 1919.

- Coordinates: 30°27′33″S 131°50′08″E
- Country: Australia
- State: South Australia
- LGA: Pastoral Unincorporated Area
- Location: 863 km (536 mi) from Port Augusta; 143 km (89 mi) from Eyre Highway

Government
  - State electorate: Giles
  - Federal division: Grey

Ooldea, known as Yuldea and various other names by Western Desert peoples (Aṉangu), is a tiny settlement in South Australia. It is on the eastern edge of the Nullarbor Plain, 863 km (536 mi) west of Port Augusta on the Trans-Australian Railway. Ooldea is 143 km (89 mi) from the bitumen Eyre Highway.

The site had a permanent waterhole, Ooldea Soak, also known as "Yooldil Kapi" in the language of the Aṉangu. The presence of the water caused it to become the site of a camp for railway construction workers in the early 20th century, and the Ooldea Mission from 1933 to 1952. The soak dried up and the site was closed to the public in 1991.

== History ==
The soak, known as Yooldil Kapi to the Aboriginal peoples of the area, and Ooldea Soak to the European settlers, made it an important camp during construction of the Trans-Australian Railway. The soak is a permanent clay pan waterhole surrounded by sand dunes, first discovered by Europeans when Ernest Giles used it in 1875. On 17 October 1917, the final link of the railway was completed at Ooldea, linking the western section from Kalgoorlie to the eastern section to Port Augusta. It was around this time that a severe drought led many desert people to migrate closer to the waterhole, increasing pressure on the limited water resources now largely reserved for use by trains. A centenary celebration was held at the siding in 2017.

The settler town that sprung up was named Ooldea, but was also referred to as Yuldea, Youldul, Yuldeh, or Yultulyngya.

It was the site of a mission known as Ooldea Mission, established by the United Aborigines Mission (UAM) in 1933. It later included a children's dormitory housing around 60 children. In 1938 an Aboriginal reserve was created covering the land around the mission. The mission was visited twice by Norman Tindale and was home for many years to Daisy Bates, both concerned with understanding and protecting Aboriginal culture. A cairn commemorating Bates was designed by F. Millward Grey and erected in 1953.

In the 1950s, areas around Maralinga and Emu were used for nuclear testing by the British Government. Around this time the Australian Government resumed much Anangu land to be used for the Woomera Rocket testing Range. Aboriginal people in the area, who were Pila Nguru (Spinifex people, of the Great Victoria Desert) were moved to the Ooldea Mission, which closed in 1952 due to internal divisions in the church. The people did not want to move from there, as they were used to ranging the desert, and had used the Ooldea Soak as a water source for many generations.

The people were forcibly moved to a reserve established by the South Australian Government on a former sheep station at Yalata, where Yalata Mission was established by the Evangelical Lutheran Church of Australia. This was an environment quite alien to them, being desert people.

The town was dependent on the Tea & Sugar train for the delivery of supplies until 1996 when the train was withdrawn. The longest dead straight section of railway line in the world starts west of Ooldea before Watson at the 797 km post and continues to a point between Loongana and Nurina, a distance of 478 km (297 mi).

The historic Ooldea Soak and Former United Aborigines Mission Site and Daisy Bates' Campsite are both listed on the South Australian Heritage Register.

Yooldil Kapi was handed back to the Aṉangu people in 1991 and is as of 2023 closed to the public.

== In the arts ==
In 2023, Bangarra Dance Theatre performed a work choreographed by their artistic director, Kokatha woman Frances Rings, called Yuldea, which tells the story of the colonisation of the area from an Aboriginal perspective.
