= Tjuntjuntjara Community =

Community in Western Australia

Tjuntjuntjara Western Australia
- Coordinates: 29.339694°0′S 127.096933°0′E
- Population: 280 (2017)
- Established: 1988
- Postcode(s): 6436
- Time zone: WST (UTC)
- Location: 650 km (404 mi) north-east of Kalgoorlie
- LGA(s): Shire of Menzies
- Region: Great Victoria Desert
- State electorate(s): Goldfields–Esperance
- Federal division(s): O'Connor
Mean max temp	Mean min temp	Annual rainfall
?	?	162 mm 6.4 in

Tjuntjuntjara, also spelt Tjuntjuntjarra, is a large Aboriginal community located 560 km (350 mi) north east of Kalgoorlie in the Goldfields–Esperance region of Western Australia, within the Shire of Menzies in the southern part of the Great Victoria Desert.

== History ==
The community was established in 1988 after a water bore was drilled at the location.

The Tjuntjuntjara community members are part of a larger group known as the Spinifex people, who were removed from their homelands (which range across the WA and SA border lands) prior to the British nuclear tests at Maralinga in the 1950s and 1960s.

Tjuntjuntjara Layout Plan No.1 was prepared in accordance with State Planning Policy 3.2 Aboriginal Settlements. Layout Plan No.1 was endorsed by the community on 3 December 2003 and the Western Australian Planning Commission on 4 May 2004.

== Description and governance ==
Tjuntjuntjara community is a large Aboriginal community located 560 km (350 mi) north east of Kalgoorlie in the Goldfields–Esperance region of Western Australia, within the Shire of Menzies in the southern part of the Great Victoria Desert. It is also sometimes spelt Tjuntjuntjarra. It is located within the fully determined Spinifex People (WAD6043/98) native title claim area.

The community relies upon regular supplies trucked from Ceduna in South Australia.

The community is managed through its incorporated body, Paupiyala Tjarutja Aboriginal Corporation, incorporated under the Aboriginal Councils and Associations Act 1976 on 19 April 1989.

== Art centre ==
The Spinifex Arts Project is a non-profit Aboriginal-owned art centre at Tjuntjuntjara. It is a member of Desart.
