= Scott Cane =

Australian anthropologist, archaeologist and historian

Scott Cane is an Australian archaeologist and anthropologist. He has lived long periods of time with the desert people of Australia, including some of the last hunter-gatherers. He is the author of Pila Nguru: The Spinifex People. He appeared in the 2013 ABC TV documentary, First Footprints and authored the accompanying book of the same title. The documentary won the 2013 Walkley Award for excellence in documentaries.

== Books by Cane ==
- Pila Nguru: The Spinifex People (2002)
- First Footprints: the epic story of the First Australians (2013)
