= Serpentine Lakes =

Chain of salt lakes in South Australia

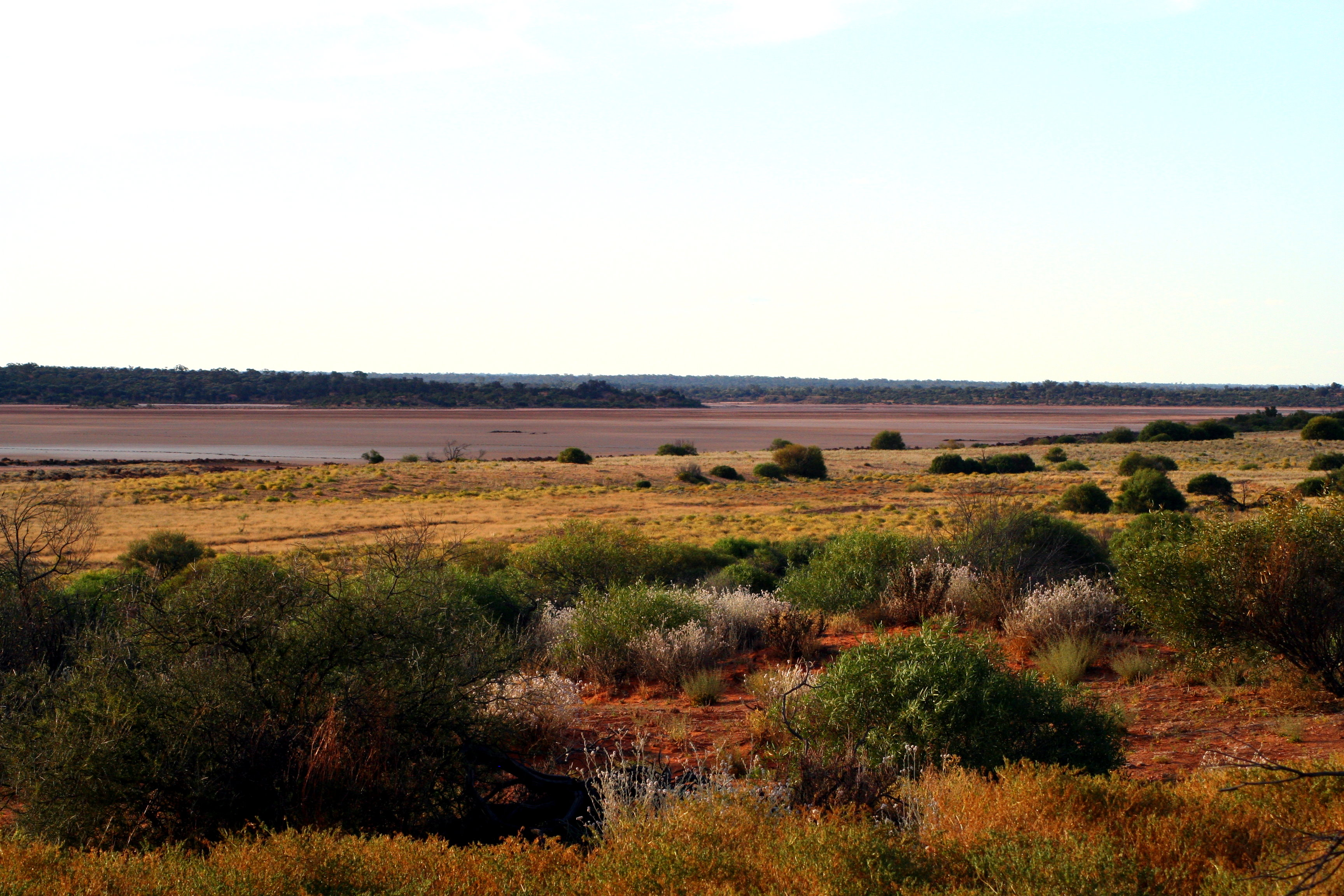
- Serpentine Lakes on the border of South Australia and Western Australia

- Location within South Australia
- Interactive map of Serpentine Lakes
- Location: South Australia and Western Australia
- Coordinates: 28°43′S 129°7′E
- Type: Salt lakes
- Basin countries: Australia
- Designation: Mamungari Conservation Park
- Max. length: 100 km (62 mi)
- Surface area: 97 km^{2} (37 sq mi)
- Surface elevation: 264 m (866 ft)

The Serpentine Lakes is a chain of salt lakes in the Great Victoria Desert of Australia. It runs for almost 100 km (62 mi) along the border between South Australia and Western Australia. When full, the lakes cover an area of 9,700 hectares (97 km^{2}). Most of it is located in the Mamungari Conservation Park. The Anne Beadell Highway crosses the northernmost arm of the lake.

The Serpentine Lakes are considered an important wetlands area. They form part of a major palaeo-drainage system, a now-inactive drainage system from the Palaeozoic era. The surface of the lake normally consists of dry clay, silt and sand, and is covered with a salty crust. The sediment is mostly quartz arenite. The lakes form the main channel of the palaeo-drainage system. Other channels are covered by sand dunes and are not well defined. The surface elevation is 264 m (866 ft) above mean sea-level.

Tektites high in magnesium have been found in these lakes.

== See also ==
- List of lakes of Australia
