= Emu Field, South Australia =

Locality in South Australia

Coordinates: 28.634350°S 132.203530°E

Location of Emu Field in South Australia

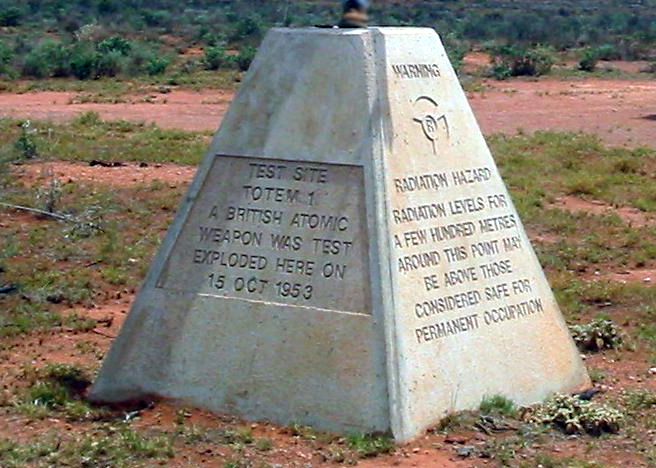
Obelisk at the Totem One test site

Emu Field (also Emu Junction or simply Emu) is the site of Operation Totem, a pair of nuclear tests conducted by the British Government in South Australia during October 1953.

The site was surveyed by Len Beadell in 1952. A village and airstrip were constructed for the subsequent testing program. The site was supported from the RAAF Woomera Range Complex.

Two British nuclear weapon tests were conducted at the site. Totem I was detonated on 15 October 1953 and Totem II was detonated on 27 October 1953. The devices were both sited on towers and yielded 9 kilotons and 7 kilotons respectively. The site was also used in September–October 1953 for some of the Kitten series of tests, which were conventional (rather than nuclear) explosions used to evaluate neutron initiators.

It was later found that the radioactive cloud from the first detonation did not disperse as expected, and travelled north-east over the Australian continent.

The site at Emu Field was unsafe for further testing due to contamination by nuclear radiation, and the search for another location led to the survey of Maralinga, where a further series of atomic tests was conducted in 1956.

There are now stone monuments at the ground-zero points, which can be visited by tourists (with the written approval of the RAAF Woomera Test Range who now control access to the area), though the location is still extremely remote (see Anne Beadell Highway). Evidence of the explosions may still be seen at ground-zero in the form of vitrified sand and concentric blast rings.

A history of the tests at Emu Field by Elizabeth Tynan was published in 2022.
