= Maralinga =

- Region
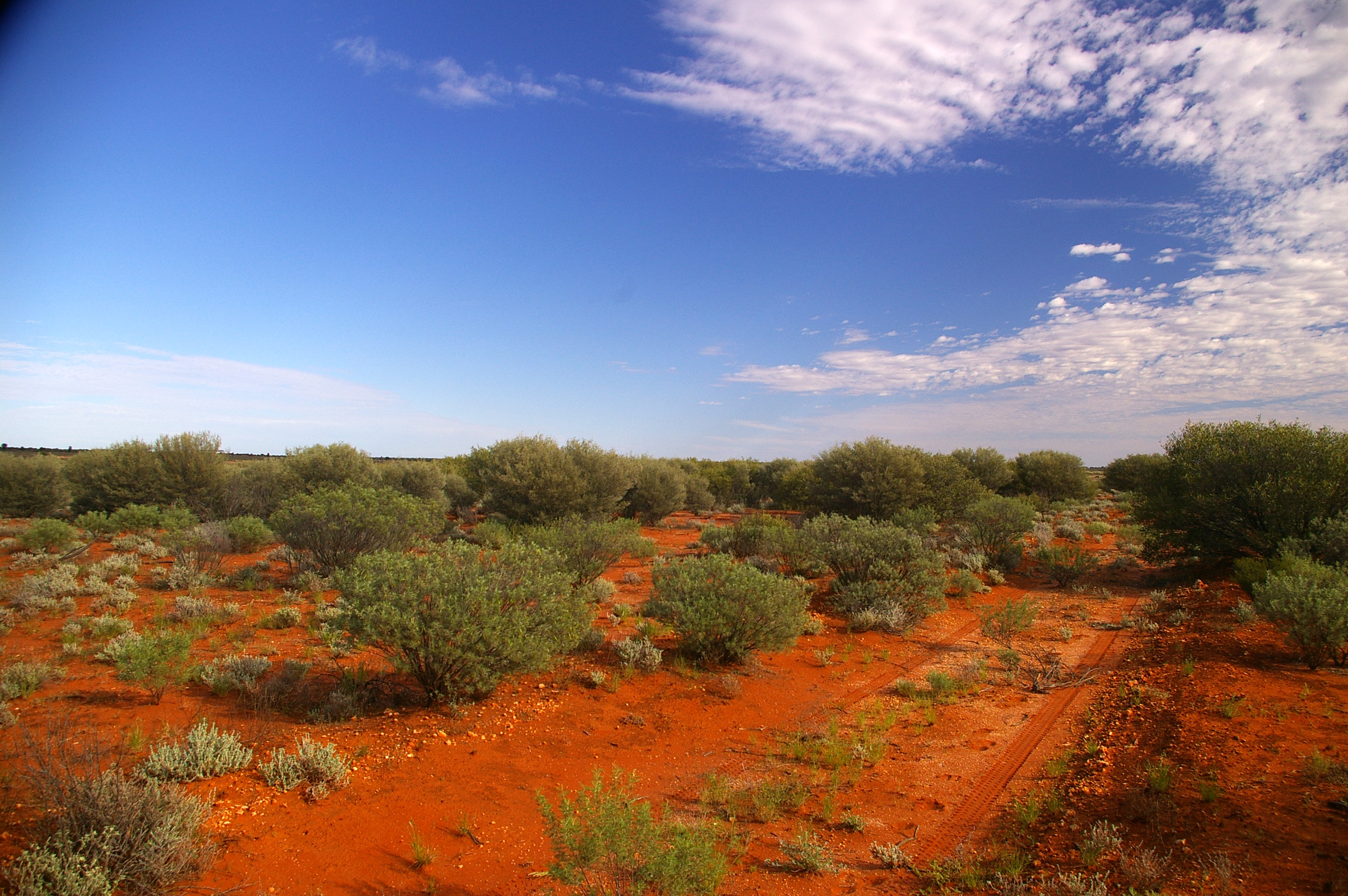
- Landscape of Maralinga site

- Coordinates: 30°09′S 131°35′E
- Country: Australia
- State: South Australia

Maralinga is a desert area around 3,300 square kilometres (1,300 sq mi) large located in the west of South Australia, within the Great Victoria Desert. The area is best known for being the location of several British nuclear tests in the 1950s.

In January 1985, in recognition of their native title, freehold title was granted to the Maralinga Tjarutja, a southern Pitjantjatjara Aboriginal Australian people, over some land. Around the same time, the McClelland Royal Commission identified significant residual nuclear contamination at some sites. Under an agreement between the governments of the United Kingdom and Australia, efforts were made to clean up the site before the Maralinga people resettled on the land in 1995. The main community, which includes a school, is Oak Valley. There are still concerns that some of the ground is still contaminated, despite two attempts at cleanup.

== History ==
=== Nuclear tests and cleanup ===
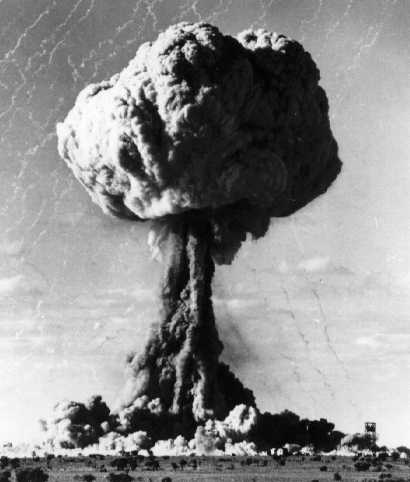
British nuclear test Operation Buffalo at Maralinga in 1956

Maralinga was the scene of UK nuclear testing and was contaminated with radioactive waste in the 1950s and early 1960s. Maralinga was surveyed by Len Beadell in the early 1950s. It followed the survey of Emu Field, which was further north and where Operation Totem with two nuclear tests was conducted.

On 27 September 1956, Operation Buffalo commenced at Maralinga, as Emu Field was found to be excessively remote. The operation consisted of the testing of four fission bombs. Two were set atop towers, one at ground level, and one released by a Royal Air Force Vickers Valiant bomber from a height of 9,100 m (30,000 ft). This was the first launching of a British atomic weapon from an aircraft.

Operation Antler followed in 1957. Antler was designed to test the triggering mechanisms of the weapons. Three tests began in September. The first two tests were conducted from towers; the last was suspended from balloons. Yields from the weapons were 1 kiloton, 6 kilotons and 25 kilotons respectively.

Participants in the test programme were prohibited from disclosing details of its undertakings. Risking incarceration, nuclear veteran Avon Hudson became a whistle-blower and spoke out to the media in the 1970s. His disclosures helped pave the way towards a public inquiry into the tests and their legacy.

The McClelland Royal Commission of 1984–1985 identified significant residual contamination at some sites. British and Australian servicemen were purposely exposed to fallout from the blasts, to study radiological effects. The local Aboriginal people have claimed they were poisoned by the tests and, in 1994, the Australian Government reached a compensation settlement with Maralinga Tjarutja of $13.5 million in settlement of all claims in relation to the nuclear testing. Previously many of these facts were kept from the public.

=== 1985 native title handback ===
In January 1985, the land was handed over to the traditional owners, the Aboriginal people of the area (Aṉangu) who are a southern branch of the Pitjantjatjara people, under the Maralinga Tjarutja Land Rights Act 1984. They were granted freehold title, and the right to developmental funds from the State and Federal governments. They completed a move back into Oak Valley in March 1985, a new community approximately 128 kilometres (80 mi) NNW of the original township of Maralinga.

Under an agreement between the governments of the United Kingdom and Australia in 1995, efforts were made to clean up the site, being completed in 1995. Tonnes of soil and debris contaminated with plutonium and uranium were buried in two trenches about 16 metres (52 ft) deep. The effectiveness of the cleanup has been disputed on a number of occasions.

In 2003 South Australian Premier Mike Rann and Education Minister Trish White opened a new school at Oak Valley, replacing what had been described as the "worst school in Australia".

== Contamination fears ==
Despite the governments of Australia and the UK paying for two decontamination programmes, concerns have been expressed that some areas of the Maralinga test sites are still contaminated 10 years after being declared "clean", as late as 2011.

It was found in 2021 that radioactive ("hot") particles persist in the soil, after international multidisciplinary team of scientists studied the results produced by a machine at Monash University that is capable of slicing open tiny samples using a beam of high-energy ions only a nanometre wide. The analysis of the results suggested that natural processes in the desert environment could bring about the slow release of plutonium over a long period. This plutonium is likely to be absorbed by wildlife at Maralinga.

== Climate ==
- Temperature from 6.5 °C (43.7 °F) in winter to 44.7 °C (112.5 °F) in summer; overnight minimum of −3 °C (27 °F) in winter.
- Rainfall average 75–125 millimetres (3.0–4.9 in)

== Documentary film ==
Maralinga Tjarutja, a May 2020 television documentary film directed by Larissa Behrendt and made by Blackfella Films for ABC Television, tells the story of the people of Maralinga. It was deliberately broadcast around the same time that the drama series Operation Buffalo was on, to give voice to the Indigenous people of the area and show how it disrupted their lives. Screenhub gave it 4.5 stars, calling it an "excellent documentary". The film shows the resilience of the Maralinga Tjarutja people, in which the elders "reveal a perspective of deep time and an understanding of place that generates respect for the sacredness of both", their ancestors having lived in the area for millennia. Despite the callous disregard for their occupation of the land shown by the British and Australians involved in the testing, the people have continued to fight for their rights to look after the contaminated land.

== See also ==
- Environmental racism
- Uranium mining in Australia
- Nuclear weapons of the United Kingdom
- Operation Grapple
- Australia and weapons of mass destruction
- Non-Proliferation Treaty (NPT)
- Treaty on the Prohibition of Nuclear Weapons
