= John Challens =

British scientist and civil servant

- Born: Wallace John Challens; 14 May 1915; Peterborough, Northamptonshire, England
- Died: 1 March 2002 (aged 86); Basingstoke, Hampshire, England
- Education: University College, Nottingham
- Known for: Atomic bomb Hydrogen bomb Chevaline
- Awards: Medal of Freedom (U.S.) (1946); Officer of the Order of the British Empire (1958); Commander of the Order of the British Empire (1967)
- Scientific career
- Workplaces: Woolwich; Aldermaston

Wallace John Challens, CBE (14 May 1915 – 1 March 2002) was a British scientist and civil servant. A graduate of University College, Nottingham, he began working at the Royal Arsenal in Woolwich in 1936. In 1939, he was transferred to the rocket department. After the defeat of Germany, he was sent to the United States as part of the British Scientific Mission to work on the V-1 flying bomb and the V-2 rocket. On returning to the United Kingdom in 1947, he was recruited by William Penney for the British atomic bomb project. He led the team that developed the firing circuits for the bomb used in Operation Hurricane, the first British nuclear test. He later developed a neutron generator. He took part in most British nuclear tests at Maralinga and was the scientific director of the Operation Grapple tests in 1957. He subsequently became the AWRE's Assistant Director in 1965, Deputy Director in 1972, and Director from 1976 until his retirement in 1978.

== Biography ==
Wallace John Challens was born in Peterborough, Northamptonshire, on 14 May 1915, the son of an engineer. He was educated at Deacon's School in Dogsthorpe, Peterborough, and University College, Nottingham. On graduating in 1936, the War Office offered him a £225 per annum job in the ballistics department at the Royal Arsenal in Woolwich, working on the ballistics of heavy guns. Good jobs were hard to come by during the Great Depression, and Challens wanted to marry and start a family. He married Joan Stephenson in 1938. They had two sons.

In 1939, he was transferred to the rocket department. During the Second World War, this moved from Woolwich to Fort Halstead, and then to Aberporth in 1940, where it became the Projectile Development Establishment, with Sir Alwyn Crow as Controller of Projectile Development and William Cook as his deputy. On 17 April 1945, he was commissioned into the British Army as a second lieutenant on the General List. After the defeat of Germany, he was sent to Germany, and then to the United States as part of the British Scientific Mission to work on the V-1 flying bomb and the V-2 rocket. For his services, he was awarded the U.S. Medal of Freedom.

On returning to the United Kingdom in 1947, he was approached by William Penney to join the British atomic bomb project, then known as High Explosive Research (HER), at the Atomic Weapons Research Establishment (AWRE). There was a tussle between the rocket and atomic bomb projects over who would have Challens' services. Penney won only after appealing to the permanent secretary of the Ministry of Supply, Sir Archibald Rowlands.

Challens was placed in charge of the group responsible for the firing circuits that would detonate the 32 pentagonal- and hexagonal-shaped explosive lenses of the implosion-type nuclear weapon, based on the American Fat Man design which Penney had worked on at the Los Alamos Laboratory as part of the British Mission to the Manhattan Project. All 32 lenses had to detonate within a few millionths of a second of each other, something well beyond the state of the art of British electronics in 1947. The firing circuits had to be safe, reliable, and durable enough to withstand buffeting in an aircraft. Models were tested in the laboratory in 1950, but the first production versions were unavailable until 1951. A problem was then discovered, which was not resolved until 1952. At first, it seemed that the fix could not be incorporated in time for Operation Hurricane, the first British nuclear test, which was only two months away, but a solution was found in the end. Challens flew out to the Montebello Islands for the test with his colleague Eddie Howse, and they were the last ones to touch the bomb, which was installed on board HMS Plym, before it was detonated.

Challens took part in most of the British nuclear tests at Maralinga, and he was the scientific director of the Operation Grapple tests at Malden Island and Christmas Island in 1957, when the first British hydrogen bombs were tested. He designed the firing circuits for these bombs and developed a neutron generator. He was part of the British delegation that met with the Americans to discuss nuclear weapons design cooperation under the 1958 US–UK Mutual Defence Agreement, and the Americans were greatly impressed with his neutron generator, which was a more advanced design than theirs. In 1959, he became the AWRE's head of Warhead Development, developing missile warheads for the RAF and the Royal Navy's Polaris submarines. He subsequently became the AWRE's Assistant Director in 1965, Deputy Director in 1972, and was its Director from 1976 until his retirement in 1978. His last major project was Chevaline, the effort to prolong the lifetime of the Polaris nuclear missile. For his services, he was made an Officer of the Order of the British Empire in the 1958 New Year Honours and a Commander of the Order of the British Empire in the 1968 New Year Honours.

His wife, Joan, died in 1971. In 1973, he married Norma Lane, who shared his passion for golf. He was captain and president of Basingstoke Golf Club and became a life member. He died suddenly on the Basingstoke golf course on 1 March 2002.
