= High Explosive Research =

UK atomic bomb development project

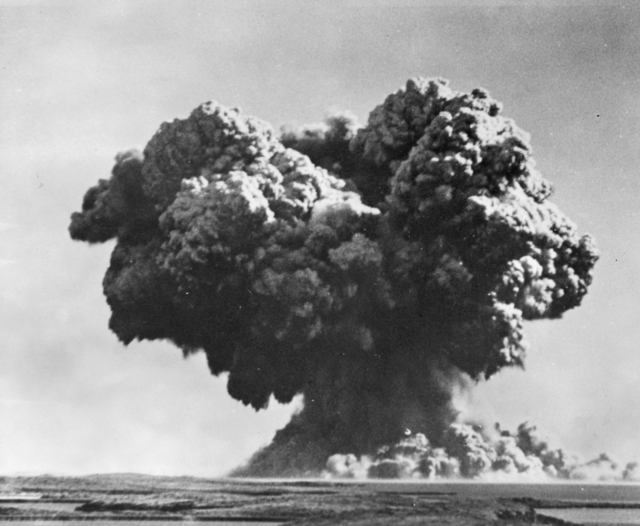
- The UK's first nuclear test, Operation Hurricane, in Australia on 3 October 1952
- Type of project: Nuclear weapon deployment
- Country: United Kingdom
- Prime Minister(s): Clement Attlee, Winston Churchill
- Key people: Lord Portal, William Penney, Christopher Hinton
- Established: 1945
- Disestablished: 1953

High Explosive Research (HER) was the British project to develop atomic bombs independently after the Second World War. This decision was taken by a cabinet sub-committee on 8 January 1947, in response to apprehension of an American return to isolationism, fears that Britain might lose its great power status, and the actions by the United States to withdraw unilaterally from sharing of nuclear technology under the 1943 Quebec Agreement. The decision was publicly announced in the House of Commons on 12 May 1948.

HER was a civil project, not a military one. Staff were drawn from and recruited into the Civil Service, and were paid Civil Service salaries. It was headed by Lord Portal, as Controller of Production, Atomic Energy, in the Ministry of Supply. An Atomic Energy Research Establishment was located at a former airfield, Harwell, in Berkshire, under the direction of John Cockcroft. The first nuclear reactor in the UK, a small research reactor known as GLEEP, went critical at Harwell on 15 August 1947. British staff at the Montreal Laboratory designed a larger reactor, known as BEPO, which went critical on 5 July 1948. They provided experience and expertise that would later be employed on the larger, production reactors.

Production facilities were constructed under the direction of Christopher Hinton, who established his headquarters in a former Royal Ordnance Factory at Risley in Lancashire. These included a uranium metal plant at Springfields, nuclear reactors and a plutonium processing plant at Windscale, and a gaseous diffusion uranium enrichment facility at Capenhurst, near Chester. The two Windscale reactors became operational in October 1950 and June 1951. The gaseous diffusion plant at Capenhurst began producing highly enriched uranium in 1954.

William Penney directed bomb design from Fort Halstead. In 1951 his design group moved to a new site at Aldermaston in Berkshire. The first British atomic bomb was successfully tested in Operation Hurricane, during which it was detonated on board the frigate HMS Plym anchored off the Monte Bello Islands in Australia on 3 October 1952. Britain thereby became the third country to test nuclear weapons, after the United States and the Soviet Union. The project concluded with the delivery of the first of its Blue Danube atomic bombs to Bomber Command in November 1953, but British hopes of a renewed nuclear Special Relationship with the United States were frustrated. The technology had been superseded by the American development of the hydrogen bomb, which was first tested in November 1952, only one month after Operation Hurricane. Britain went on to develop its own hydrogen bombs, which it first tested in 1957. A year later, the United States and Britain resumed nuclear weapons cooperation.

== Background ==
=== Tube Alloys ===
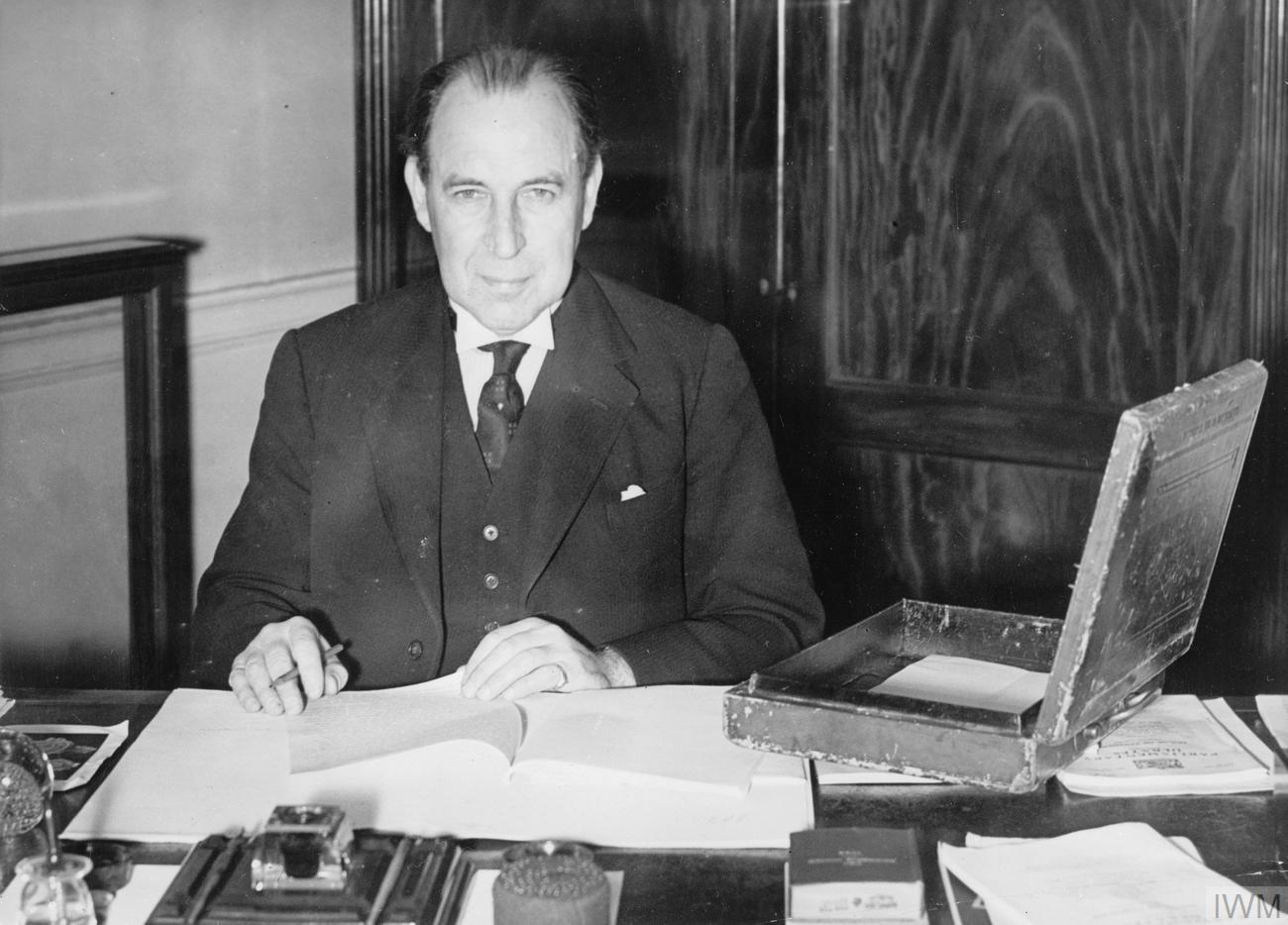
Sir John Anderson, the minister responsible for Tube Alloys

The neutron was discovered by James Chadwick at the Cavendish Laboratory at the University of Cambridge in February 1932. In April 1932, his Cavendish colleagues John Cockcroft and Ernest Walton split lithium atoms with accelerated protons. Enrico Fermi and his team in Rome conducted experiments involving the bombardment of elements by slow neutrons, which produced heavier elements and isotopes. Then, in December 1938, Otto Hahn and Fritz Strassmann at Hahn's laboratory in Berlin-Dahlem bombarded uranium with slowed neutrons, and discovered that barium had been produced, and therefore that the uranium nucleus had been split. Hahn wrote to his colleague Lise Meitner, who, with her nephew Otto Frisch, developed a theoretical justification for the process, which they published in Nature in 1939. By analogy with the division of biological cells, they named the process "fission".

The discovery of fission raised the possibility that an extremely powerful atomic bomb could be created. The term was already familiar to the British public through the writings of H. G. Wells, in his 1913 novel The World Set Free. George Paget Thomson, at Imperial College London, and Mark Oliphant, an Australian physicist at the University of Birmingham, were tasked with carrying out a series of experiments on uranium. By February 1940, Thomson's team had failed to create a chain reaction in natural uranium, and he had decided that it was not worth pursuing; but at Birmingham, Oliphant's team had reached a strikingly different conclusion. Oliphant had delegated the task to two German refugee scientists, Rudolf Peierls and Frisch, who could not work on the university's secret projects like radar because they were enemy aliens and therefore lacked the necessary security clearance. They calculated the critical mass of a metallic sphere of pure uranium-235, and found that instead of tons, as everyone had assumed, as little as 1 to 10 kilograms (2.2 to 22.0 lb) would suffice, which would explode with the power of thousands of tons of dynamite.

Oliphant took the Frisch–Peierls memorandum to Sir Henry Tizard, the chairman of the Tizard Committee, and the MAUD Committee was established to investigate further. It directed an intensive research effort, and in July 1941, produced two comprehensive reports that concluded an atomic bomb was not only technically feasible, but could be produced before the war ended, perhaps in as little as two years. The Committee unanimously recommended pursuing the development of an atomic bomb as a matter of urgency, although it recognised that the resources required might be beyond those available to Britain. A new directorate known by the deliberately misleading name of Tube Alloys was created to coordinate this effort. Sir John Anderson, the Lord President of the Council, became the minister responsible, and Wallace Akers from Imperial Chemical Industries (ICI) was appointed the director of Tube Alloys.

=== Manhattan Project ===
In July 1940, Britain had offered to give the United States access to its scientific research, and Cockcroft, as part of the Tizard Mission, briefed American scientists on British developments. He discovered that the American project was smaller than the British, and not as far advanced. The British and American projects exchanged information, but did not initially combine their efforts. British officials did not reply to an August 1941 American offer to create a combined project. In November 1941, Frederick L. Hovde, the head of the London liaison office of the American Office of Scientific Research and Development (OSRD), raised the issue of cooperation and exchange of information with Anderson and Lord Cherwell, who demurred, ostensibly over concerns about American security. Unknown to the British, their project had already been penetrated by atomic spies for the Soviet Union.

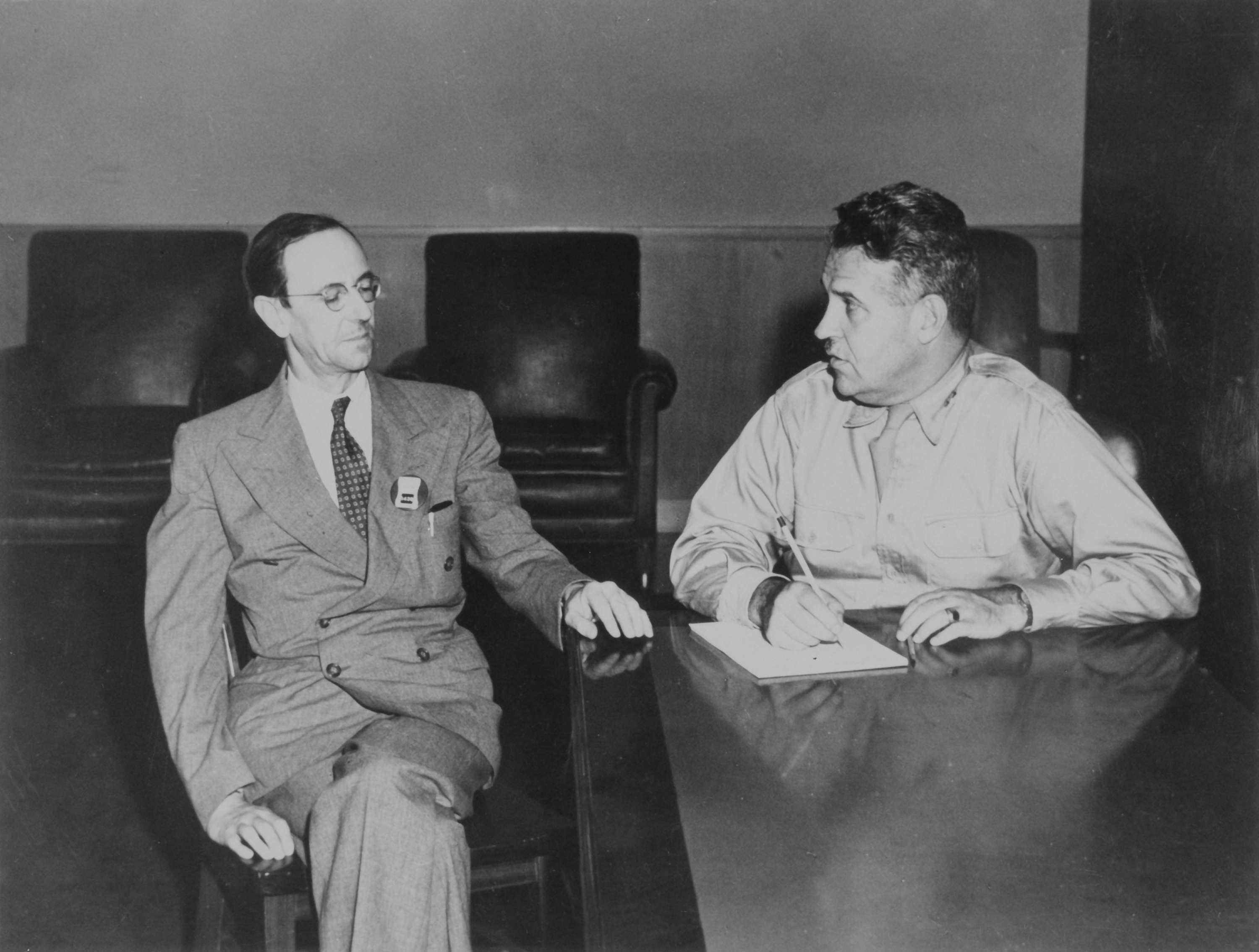
James Chadwick (left), head of the British Mission, with Major General Leslie R. Groves Jr., director of the Manhattan Project

The United Kingdom did not have the manpower or resources of the United States, and despite its early and promising start, Tube Alloys fell behind its American counterpart and was dwarfed by it. On 30 July 1942, Anderson advised the Prime Minister, Winston Churchill, that: "We must face the fact that ... [our] pioneering work ... is a dwindling asset and that, unless we capitalise it quickly, we shall be outstripped. We now have a real contribution to make to a 'merger.' Soon we shall have little or none."

The British considered producing an atomic bomb without American help, but the project would have needed overwhelming priority, the predicted cost was staggering, disruption to other wartime priorities was inevitable, and it was unlikely to be ready in time to affect the outcome of the war in Europe. The unanimous response was that before embarking on this, another effort should be made to secure American cooperation. At the Quadrant Conference in August 1943, Churchill and the American President, Franklin Roosevelt, signed the Quebec Agreement, which merged the two national projects. It stipulated that the United States could limit Britain's post-war commercial and industrial use of atomic energy, making it clear that Britain was the junior partner in the Grand Alliance. The British considered the Quebec Agreement to be the best deal they could have struck under the circumstances, and the restrictions were the price they had to pay to obtain the technical information needed for a successful post-war nuclear weapons project. Margaret Gowing noted that the "idea of the independent deterrent was already well entrenched."

The Quebec Agreement established the Combined Policy Committee and the Combined Development Trust to coordinate their efforts. The 19 September 1944 Hyde Park Aide-Mémoire extended both commercial and military cooperation into the post-war period. A British mission led by Akers assisted in the development of gaseous diffusion technology at the SAM Laboratories in New York. Another, led by Oliphant, who acted as deputy director at the Berkeley Radiation Laboratory, assisted with the electromagnetic separation process. Cockcroft became the director of the Anglo-Canadian Montreal Laboratory. The British mission to the Los Alamos Laboratory led by James Chadwick, and later Peierls, included distinguished scientists such as Geoffrey Taylor, James Tuck, Niels Bohr, William Penney, Frisch, Ernest Titterton and Klaus Fuchs, who was later revealed to be a Soviet spy. As overall head of the British Mission, Chadwick forged a close and successful partnership with Brigadier General Leslie R. Groves, the director of the Manhattan Project. He ensured that British participation was complete and wholehearted.

=== End of American cooperation ===
With the end of the war the Special Relationship between Britain and the United States "became very much less special". The British government had trusted that America would share nuclear technology, which it considered a joint discovery. On 8 August 1945 the Prime Minister, Clement Attlee, sent a message to President Harry Truman in which he referred to themselves as "heads of the Governments which have control of this great force". Roosevelt had died on 12 April 1945, and the Hyde Park Aide-Mémoire was not binding on subsequent administrations. In fact, the American copy was temporarily physically lost. When Field Marshal Henry Maitland Wilson raised the matter in a Combined Policy Committee meeting in June, the American copy could not be found. The British sent Secretary of War, Henry L. Stimson a photocopy on 18 July 1945. Even then, Groves questioned the document's authenticity until the American copy was located years later in the papers of Vice Admiral Wilson Brown Jr., Roosevelt's naval aide, apparently misfiled by someone unaware of what Tube Alloys was, and thought it had something to do with naval guns.

On 9 November 1945, Attlee and the Prime Minister of Canada, Mackenzie King, went to Washington, D.C., to confer with Truman about future cooperation in nuclear weapons and nuclear power. A Memorandum of Intention they signed replaced the Quebec Agreement. It made Canada a full partner; continued the Combined Policy Committee and Combined Development Trust; and reduced the obligation to obtain consent for the use of nuclear weapons to merely requiring consultation. The three leaders agreed that there would be full and effective cooperation on atomic energy, but British hopes for a resumption of cooperation on nuclear energy were disappointed. The Americans soon made it clear that cooperation was restricted to basic scientific research.

The next meeting of the Combined Policy Committee on 15 April 1946 produced no accord on collaboration, and resulted in an exchange of cables between Truman and Attlee. Truman cabled on 20 April that he did not see the communiqué he had signed as obligating the United States to assist Britain in designing, constructing and operating an atomic energy plant. The passing of the Atomic Energy Act of 1946 (McMahon Act) in August 1946, which was signed by Truman on 1 August 1946, and went into effect at midnight on 1 January 1947, ended technical cooperation. Its control of "restricted data" prevented the United States' allies from receiving any information. This partly resulted from the arrest for espionage of British physicist Alan Nunn May, who had worked in the Montreal Laboratory, in February 1946, while the legislation was being debated. The remaining British scientists working in the United States were denied access to papers that they had written just days before.

== Resumption of independent UK efforts ==
=== Organisation ===
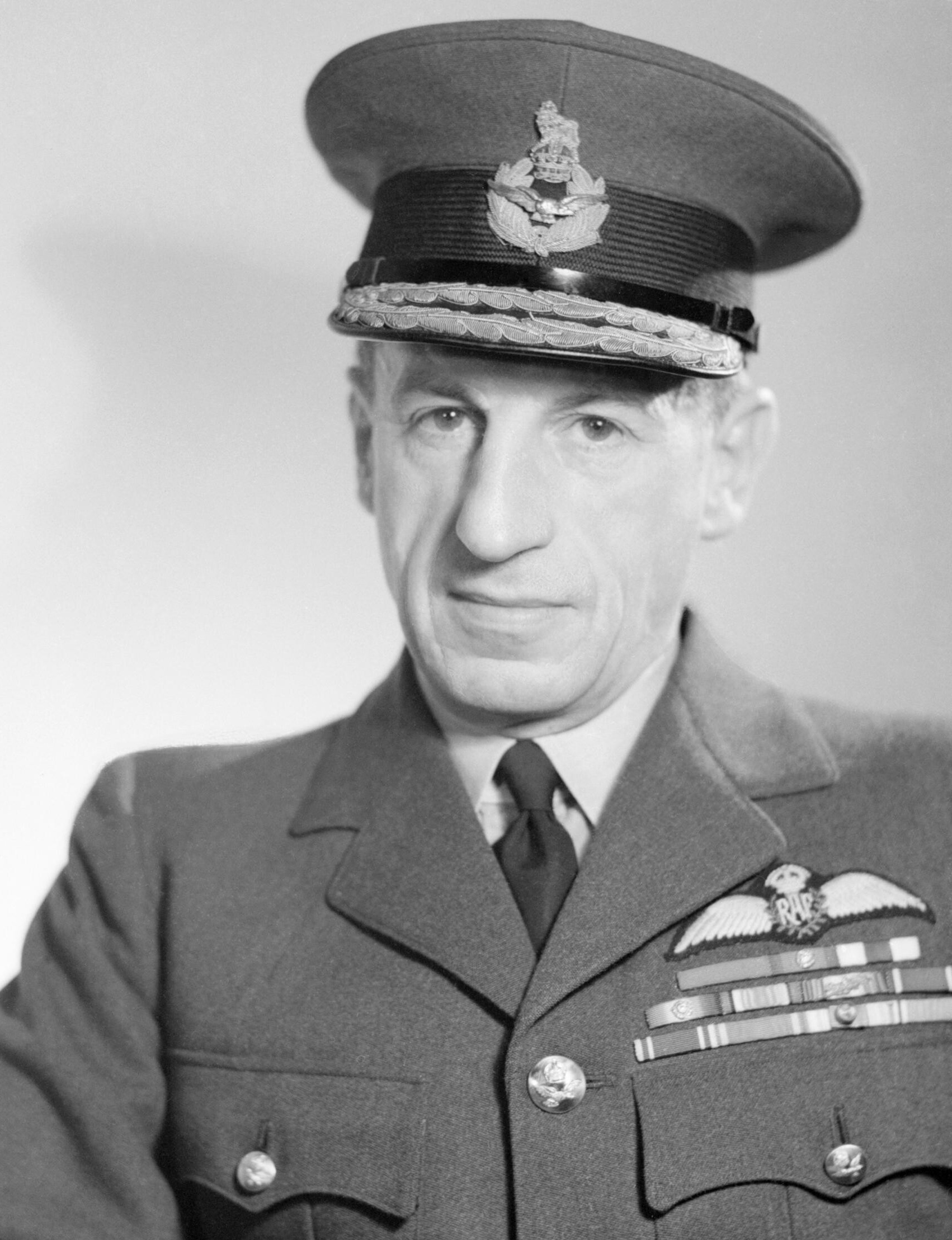
Lord Portal, Controller of Production, Atomic Energy

Attlee had created a cabinet sub-committee, the Gen 75 Committee (known informally by Attlee as the "Atomic Bomb Committee"), on 10 August 1945 to examine the feasibility of a nuclear weapons programme. To provide technical advice, Attlee created an Advisory Committee on Atomic Energy, with Anderson as its chairman. Anderson was an independent Member of Parliament for the Scottish Universities who sat on the Opposition Front Bench. As chairman of the Advisory Committee on Atomic Energy, Anderson had his own office in the Cabinet Office, and the services of its secretariat. He accompanied Attlee on his November 1945 trip to the United States. A 2 September 1945 Admiralty study of "The Influence of the Atomic Bomb on War" forecast that an enemy could build 500 bombs during ten years of peace, and warned that if 10 per cent of the arsenal was used on the United Kingdom, "over night the main base of the British Empire could be rendered ineffective", with enough left for other British forces around the world.

In October 1945, the Gen 75 Committee considered the issue of ministerial responsibility for atomic energy. The Cabinet Secretary, Sir Edward Bridges, and the Advisory Committee on Atomic Energy both recommended that it be placed within the Ministry of Supply. Developing atomic energy would require an enormous construction effort, which the Ministry of Supply was best equipped to undertake. The Tube Alloys Directorate was transferred from the Department of Scientific and Industrial Research to the Ministry of Supply effective 1 November 1945. To coordinate the atomic energy effort, it was decided to appoint a Controller of Production, Atomic Energy (CPAE). The Minister of Supply, John Wilmot, suggested Marshal of the Royal Air Force Lord Portal, the wartime Chief of the Air Staff. Portal was reluctant to accept the post, as he felt that he lacked administrative experience outside the Royal Air Force, but eventually accepted it for a two-year term, commencing in March 1946. In this role he had direct access to the Prime Minister. Portal ran the project until 1951, when he was succeeded by Sir Frederick Morgan. He established his headquarters at Shell Mex House on the Strand, London, where the wartime Tube Alloys had been. Special security barriers were installed to close off this section of the offices, giving the area the nickname "the Cage".

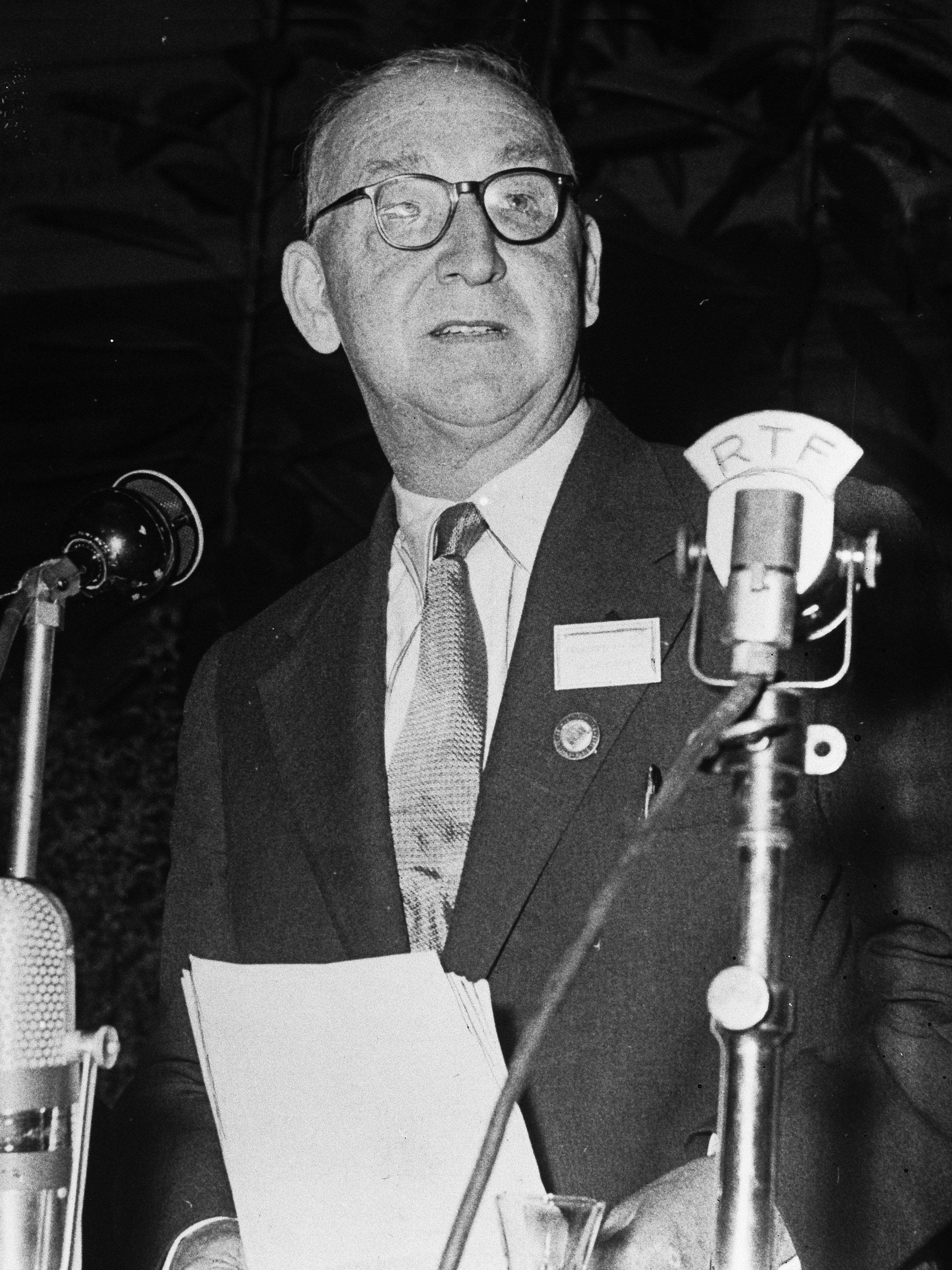
John Cockcroft, head of the Atomic Energy Research Establishment

With Portal's appointment came consideration of splitting Anderson's committee, which functioned as both an advisory and an interdepartmental body. In August 1946, a new standing committee was created, the Atomic Energy Official Committee, which assumed the interdepartmental function. In March 1947, Roger Makins became its chairman. Anderson's committee declined in influence, and was disbanded when he departed at the end of 1947. During the war, Christopher Hinton had been seconded from ICI to the Ministry of Supply and had become Deputy Director General of Filling Factories. He was due to return to ICI at the end 1945, but agreed to oversee the design, construction and operation of the new facilities at a salary far below that offered by ICI. He established his headquarters in a former Royal Ordnance Factory at Risley in Lancashire on 4 February 1946. Portal also created a position of Deputy Controller (Technical Policy), to which he appointed Michael Perrin. This created ill-feeling, as Perrin had been junior to Hinton at ICI. Portal also created a Technical Committee to replace the old Tube Alloys Technical Committee. To give the Ministry of Supply's control over atomic energy a legal form, a bill was introduced into the House of Commons on 1 May 1946 that became law as the Atomic Energy Act 1946 on 6 November 1946.

During the war, Chadwick, Cockcroft, Oliphant, Peierls, Harrie Massey and Herbert Skinner had met in Washington, D.C., in November 1944, and drawn up a proposal for a British atomic energy research establishment, which they had calculated would cost around £1.5 million. The Tube Alloys Committee endorsed their recommendation in April 1945, and Attlee announced its creation in the House of Commons on 29 October 1945, informing the House that it would cost about £1 million to build and £500,000 per annum to run. The obvious choices for a director of the new establishment were Chadwick and Cockcroft, and the former urged that the latter be appointed. Cockcroft agreed, subject to stipulation in writing that he would be answerable only to the Minister and his Permanent Secretary, and, except where subject to requirements for military secrecy, the establishment would be run like a university, with free exchange of views and the publication of papers. His appointment was announced in November 1945, although he did not leave Canada until September 1946. The Atomic Energy Research Establishment (AERE) did not come under Portal's control until January 1950. A committee selected a site for the AERE at RAF Harwell, an airfield about 13 miles (21 km) south of Oxford. The airfield was a modern one, with a long runway, and the Air Ministry was reluctant to release it until the Prime Minister intervened.

Responsibility for the development of atomic bombs lay outside the realm of the Ministry of Defence. One reason for this was that it was only created in October 1946, by which time Portal had already been appointed as CPAE. Tizard became the Chief Scientific Adviser to the Ministry of Defence in November 1946, and in January 1947 he also became the chairman of the Defence Research Policy Committee (DRPC), which was established to advise the Minister of Defence and the Chiefs of Staff on matters of scientific policy. Tizard attempted to gain some control over nuclear weapons policy. Anderson's advisory committee was abolished at the end of 1947, and two new committees were established in its place, the Atomic Energy (Defence Research) Committee AE(DR), which came under the DRPC, and was chaired by Tizard; and the Atomic Energy (Review of Production) Committee, which was answerable to Portal. But Tizard failed to gain control of atomic energy policy.

=== Decision ===
An early debate among the scientists was whether the fissile material for an atomic bomb should be uranium-235 or plutonium. Tube Alloys had performed much of the pioneering research on gaseous diffusion for uranium enrichment, and Oliphant's team in Berkeley were well-acquainted with the electromagnetic process. The staff that had remained in Britain strongly favoured uranium-235; but the scientists that had worked in the United States argued for plutonium on the basis of its greater efficiency as an explosive, despite the fact that they had neither the expertise in the design of nuclear reactors to produce it, nor the requisite knowledge of plutonium chemistry or metallurgy to extract it. However, the Montreal Laboratory had designed and was building pilot reactors, and had carried out some work on separating plutonium from uranium. The Manhattan Project had pursued both avenues, and the scientists who had worked at Los Alamos were aware of work there with composite cores that used both; but there were concerns that Britain might not have the money, resources or skilled manpower for this. In the end, it came down to economics; a reactor could be built more cheaply than a separation plant that produced an equivalent quantity of enriched uranium, and made more efficient use of uranium fuel. A reactor and separation plant capable of producing enough plutonium for fifteen bombs per year was costed at around £20 million. The facility was approved by the Gen 75 committee on 18 December 1945 "with the highest urgency and importance".

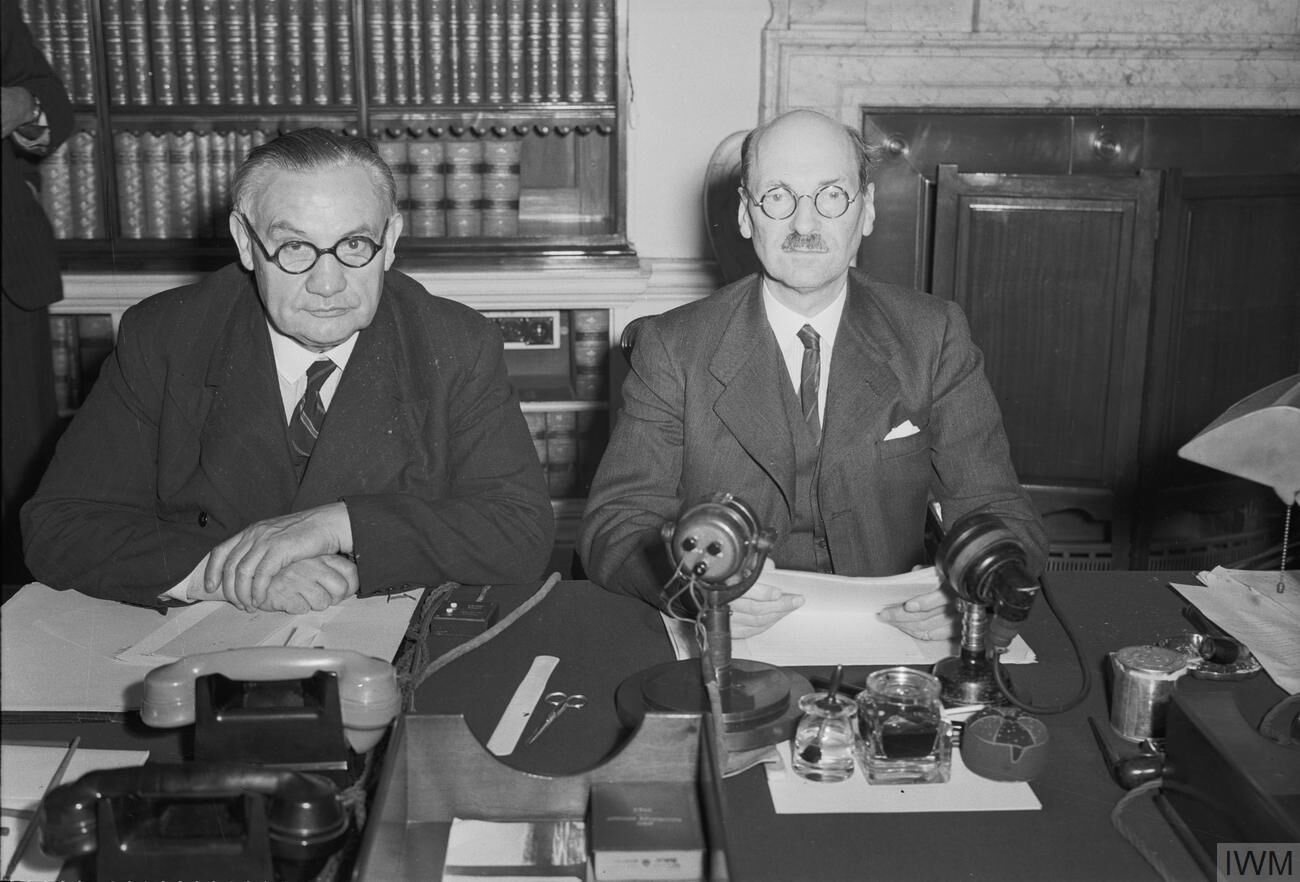
Prime Minister Clement Attlee (right) and his foreign secretary Ernest Bevin

A few months later, Portal, who had not been appointed when this decision was taken, began to have doubts. Word reached him of problems with the Hanford Site reactors, which had been all but completely shut down due to the Wigner effect. On a visit to the United States in May 1946, Groves advised Portal not to build a reactor. By this time, there was interest from the scientists in making better use of uranium fuel by re-enrichment of spent fuel rods. A gaseous diffusion plant was costed at somewhere between £30 and £40 million. The Gen 75 Committee considered the proposal in October 1946. Perrin, who was present, later recalled that:

The meeting was about to decide against it on grounds of cost, when [Ernest] Bevin arrived late and said "We've got to have this thing. I don't mind it for myself, but I don't want any other Foreign Secretary of this country to be talked at or to by the Secretary of State of the United States as I have just been in my discussion with Mr Byrnes. We've got to have this thing over here, whatever it costs ... We've got to have the bloody Union Jack flying on top of it."

Penney had joined the Los Alamos Laboratory in 1944, and had served on the Target Committee that had selected cities to be attacked. He had been in the observation plane Big Stink during the bombing of Nagasaki, and had done damage assessment on the ground following Japan's surrender. He had returned to England in November 1945 intending to resume his academic career, but was approached by C. P. Snow, one of the Civil Service Commissioners, and asked to become Chief Superintendent Armament Research (CSAR, pronounced "Caesar"), in charge of the Ministry of Supply's Armaments Research Department (ARD) at Fort Halstead in Kent. His appointment as CSAR was announced on 1 January 1946, but Groves asked him to assist in the American Operation Crossroads nuclear tests at Bikini Atoll. Penney left for the United States in March 1946, and did not return to Britain until October 1946. Portal then asked him to draw up a scheme for an Atomic Weapons Section within the Armaments Research Department which would design, develop and construct atomic bombs. In his 1 November 1946 report to Portal, which he had to type himself for security reasons, Penney provided a proposed organisation chart, detailed his staffing requirements, and listed his accommodation requirements, which he felt could be met at Fort Halstead, the Royal Arsenal at Woolwich, and Shoeburyness.

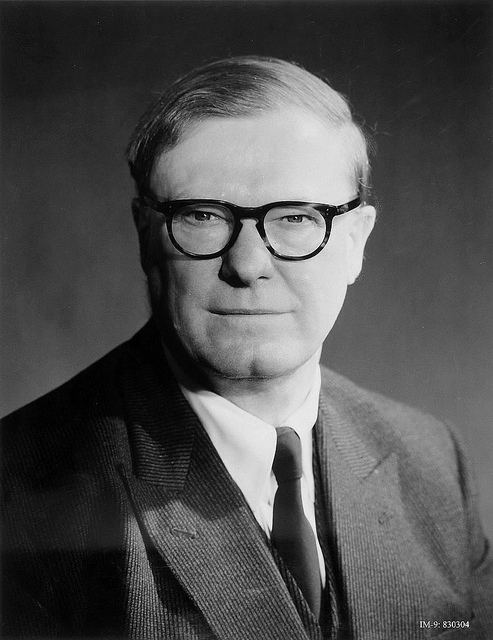
William Penney, Chief Superintendent Armament Research

In July 1946, the Chiefs of Staff Committee considered the issue of nuclear weapons, and recommended that Britain acquire them. This recommendation was accepted by the Cabinet Defence Committee on 22 July 1946. The Chief of the Air Staff, Lord Tedder, officially requested an atomic bomb on 9 August 1946. The Chiefs of Staff estimated that 200 bombs would be required by 1957. Despite this, and the research and construction of facilities that had already been approved, there was still no official decision to proceed with making atomic bombs. Portal submitted his proposal to do so at the 8 January 1947 meeting of the Gen 163 Committee, another ad hoc committee, which agreed to proceed with the development of atomic bombs. It also endorsed Portal's proposal to place Penney in charge of the bomb development effort, although Penney was not informed of this decision until May. Of the decision, Margaret Gowing wrote:

The British decision to make an atomic bomb had "emerged" from a body of general assumptions. It had not been a response to an immediate military threat but rather something fundamental and almost instinctive—a feeling that Britain must possess so climactic a weapon in order to deter an atomically armed enemy, a feeling that Britain as a great power must acquire all major new weapons, a feeling that atomic weapons were a manifestation of the scientific and technological superiority on which Britain's strength, so deficient if measured in sheer numbers of men, must depend.

This represented deep-rooted British political and strategic ideas. The war had left Britain impoverished. Its gold and dollar reserves had been depleted. A third of its merchant ships now lay on the bottom of the ocean. About 250,000 homes had been destroyed and another 3 million had been damaged while hardly any had been built for years. In early 1947, factories suspended production for want of coal. The United States had abruptly terminated Lend-Lease when the war ended. In its place was a $3.75 billion loan from the United States and a $1.25 billion loan from Canada, most of which had been spent by August 1947. Nonetheless, there remained an implacable belief that the future would be like the past. Bevin told the House of Commons on 16 May 1947 that:

His Majesty's Government does not accept the view ... that we have ceased to be a great power, or the contention that we have ceased to play that role. We regard ourselves as one of the powers most vital to the peace of the world, and we still have a historic part to play. The very fact we have fought so hard for liberty, and paid such a price, warrants our retaining that position; and indeed it places a duty upon us to continue to retain it. I am not aware of any suggestion, seriously advanced, that by a sudden stroke of fate, as it were, we have overnight ceased to be a great power.

In his 1961 memoirs, Attlee explained his decision:

At that time we had to bear in mind that there was always the possibility of [the United States] withdrawing and becoming isolationist again. The manufacture of a British atom bomb was therefore at that stage essential to our defence. You must remember this was all prior to NATO. NATO has altered things. But at that time although we were doing our best to make the Americans understand the realities of the European situation—the world situation—we couldn't be sure we'd succeed. In the end we did. But we couldn't take risks with British security in the meantime.

The decision was publicly announced in the House of Commons on 12 May 1948 by the Minister of Defence, Albert Alexander, albeit in an oblique answer to a pre-arranged question from George Jeger, a Labour Party backbencher. D notice No. 25 prohibited the publication of details on the design, construction or location of atomic weapons. The project was hidden under the cover name "Basic High Explosive Research". "Basic" was soon dropped and it became simply "High Explosive Research" (HER).

== Uranium ==
Uranium was the only known fuel for nuclear reactors, so securing an adequate supply was crucial to the British atomic energy programme. During the war, Britain took the lead in reopening the world's richest uranium mine, the Shinkolobwe mine in the Belgian Congo, which had been flooded and closed, as 30 per cent of the stock in Union Minière du Haut Katanga, the company that owned the mine, was controlled by British interests. In May 1944, Sir John Anderson and US Ambassador John Winant negotiated a deal with the Belgian government in exile and Edgar Sengier, the director of Union Minière, for the mine to be reopened and 1,720 long tons (1,750 t) of ore to be purchased at $1.45 a pound. American and British leaders concluded that it was in their best interest to gain control of as much of the world's uranium deposits as possible. The Combined Development Trust was established for this purpose on 14 June 1944. It consisted of three American, two British and one Canadian members, with an American, initially Groves, as chairman. By the end of the war, it had control of 97 per cent of the world's uranium and 65 per cent of the thorium.

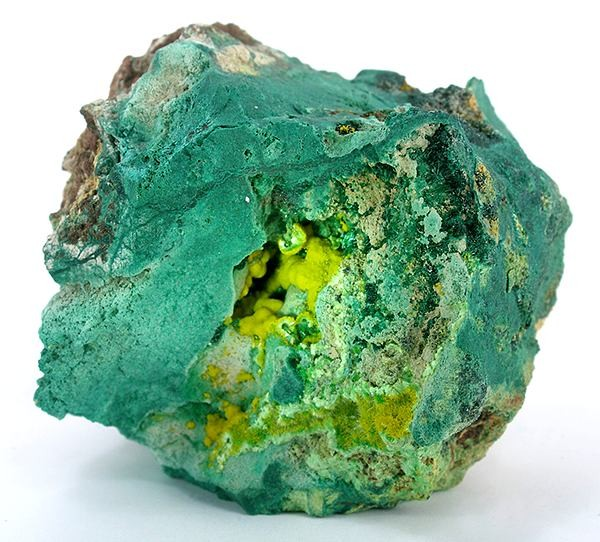
Uranophane in malachite specimen from the Shinkolobwe mine

During the war, all the uranium from the Congo had gone to the United States, as had that captured in Europe by the Alsos Mission, even though some of it passed through British hands. The entire output of the Shinkolobwe mine was contracted to the Combined Development Trust until 1956, but in March 1946 there were fears that the mine might be exhausted in 1947, resulting in a severe uranium shortage. After some negotiation, Groves and Chadwick agreed on a division of uranium ore production, with everything up to March 1946 going to the United States, and supplies being shared equally thereafter. At the Combined Policy Committee meeting on 31 July 1946, the financial arrangements were adjusted. Previously, the two countries had split the costs equally; henceforth each would pay for only what they actually received. Britain was therefore able to secure the uranium it needed without having to outbid the United States, and paid for it in sterling. Meanwhile, because the adjustment applied retrospectively to VJ Day, it received reimbursement for the supplies allocated to the United States, thus easing Britain's dollar shortage.

By the end of 1946, Britain had received 1,350 long tons (1,370 t), and another 500 was stockpiled for the Trust at Springfields, near Preston in Lancashire. Uranium ore was stockpiled in Britain because the McMahon Act did not permit it to be exported from the United States. Groves extended the arrangement into 1947, and another 1,400 long tons (1,400 t) was shipped to Britain, all of which was added to the Springfields stockpile. Its growing size was the principal reason the Americans reopened the negotiations resulting in the Modus Vivendi, which allowed for limited sharing of technical information between the United States, Britain and Canada. Under this agreement, all the Congo ore from 1948 and 1949 was shipped to the United States. The Trust was renamed the Combined Development Agency in January 1948.

The first Soviet atomic bomb test in August 1949 was embarrassing to the British (who had not expected a Soviet atomic weapon until 1954) for having been beaten, but it was for the Americans another reason for cooperation. The agreement on raw materials was due to expire at the end of the year. The Americans offered to make bombs in the United States available for Britain to use if the British agreed to end their atomic bomb programme. This offer was rejected on the grounds that it was not "compatible with our status as a first class power to depend on others for weapons of this supreme importance." Instead, the British suggested that there would be a full exchange of atomic information, and in return for ending the production of atomic bombs in Britain, American bombs would be stored in Britain under British control. This would have given Britain nuclear weapons much sooner than its own target date of late 1952. The opposition of several key officials, including the United States Atomic Energy Commission's Lewis Strauss, and Senators Bourke B. Hickenlooper and Arthur Vandenberg, coupled with security concerns aroused by the 2 February 1950 arrest of Fuchs, who was working at Harwell, as a Soviet spy, caused the proposal to be rejected.

By this time, most of the original 1,350 long tons (1,370 t) allocated to Britain had been used up, and the Americans agreed to allocate 505 long tons (513 t) from the Springfields stockpile. Britain was allocated a further 561 long tons (570 t) in 1951, and 500 long tons (510 t) in 1952. Due to increased production, and the discovery and development of new sources of uranium in Portugal, South Africa and Australia, there was sufficient uranium for the United States, British and Canadian programmes, although Britain had to cancel a reactor in 1949.

== Production facilities ==
Between January 1946 and March 1953, £44 million was spent on constructing nuclear weapons facilities. Staff were drawn from and recruited into the Civil Service, and were paid Civil Service salaries.

=== Uranium metal plant ===
During the war, Chadwick had arranged for ICI to build a small plant to produce uranium. By 1947, it was operational and producing 3,000 pounds (1,400 kg) per week. This would be used in BEPO, the experimental reactor built at Harwell, but the plant required uranium oxide feed, and the export of this from the United States was banned under the McMahon Act. Hinton and his staff at Risley built a new uranium plant at Springfields, on the site of a former poison gas plant, at a cost of £5.5 million. The first uranium metal was produced in October 1948.

Uranium ore was crushed and dissolved in acids. Impurities were separated and uranium oxide was precipitated. Radium was returned to Union Minière under the contract with the company. The uranium oxide was then purified. It was dissolved in nitric acid to produce uranyl nitrate. This was then dissolved in ether, drawn off and precipitated by the addition of ammonia, producing ammonium diuranate. The ammonium diuranate was heated in a furnace and reduced with hydrogen and hydrofluoric acid to produce uranium tetrafluoride. Heating and mixing with calcium metal reduced it to metallic uranium, leaving calcium fluoride behind as a slag. The metallic uranium was then cast into billets. These were extruded into rods and sealed in aluminium cans.

=== Nuclear reactors ===
The first nuclear reactor in the UK, a small 100 kW research reactor known as GLEEP, went critical at Harwell on 15 August 1947. It was fuelled by 12 long tons (12 t) of uranium metal and 21 long tons (21 t) of uranium dioxide, and used 505 long tons (513 t) of nuclear graphite as a neutron moderator. This was fine for some experimental work, but the production of radioactive isotopes required a more powerful 6,000 kW reactor with a higher neutron flux. British staff at the Montreal Laboratory had designed BEPO in 1945 and 1946; Risley handled the engineering and construction. The key choices in reactor design are the selection of the fuel, the neutron moderator, and the coolant. Since enriched uranium was unavailable, the only available fuel was natural uranium. Similarly, while the Montreal Laboratory had experience with designing and building the ZEEP heavy-water reactor in Canada, no heavy water was available in the UK, so graphite was the only choice for a neutron moderator. That left cooling, and for an experimental reactor, air cooling was the obvious choice. The resulting reactor was thus quite similar to the American X-10 Graphite Reactor. BEPO, which went critical on 5 July 1948, used 40 long tons (41 t) of metallic uranium and 850 long tons (860 t) of graphite, encased in 600 long tons (610 t) of steel and 3,000 long tons (3,000 t) of concrete.

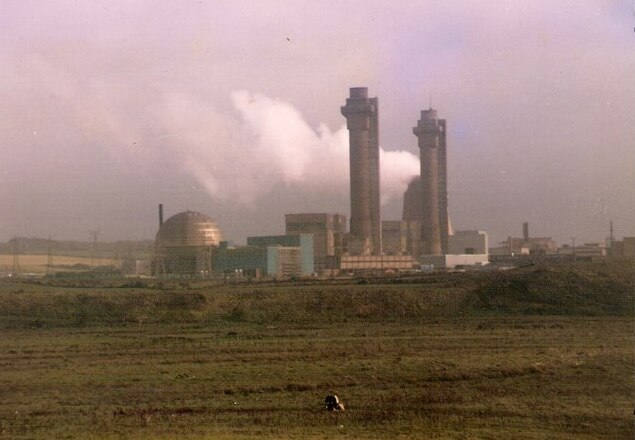
The Windscale Piles (centre and right)

For the plutonium-producing production reactors, the same reasons mandated the use of natural uranium fuel and graphite as a moderator; but it was originally assumed that they would be water-cooled like the American reactors at the Hanford Site. A water-cooled reactor of the required size would require about 30,000 imperial gallons (140,000 L; 36,000 US gal) of water per day, preferably very pure so as to avoid corroding the metal pipes. Moreover, there were concerns about safety. Water absorbs neutrons, so if there is a sudden loss of cooling water this will result in an increase in the neutron flux and the reactor temperature, and possibly a catastrophic nuclear meltdown. Such an event did indeed occur in the Chernobyl disaster in 1986. The American solution was to locate the facility in a remote location, but in the densely populated British Isles the only such locations were in the north and west of Scotland. By April 1947, Hinton had convinced Portal of the advantages of a gas-cooled system. Helium was at first the preferred choice as a coolant gas, but the main source of it was the United States, and under the McMahon Act, the United States would not supply it for nuclear weapons production, so, in the end, air cooling was chosen.

With the need for a remote site obviated, it was decided to build the facility on the coast of Cumberland at a former Royal Ordnance Factory, ROF Drigg. This was soon switched to a more suitable site at the nearby former ROF Sellafield. To avoid any confusion with Springfields, the name was changed to Windscale. Construction began in September 1947. The danger of the Wigner Effect was not overlooked. Walter Zinn visited Britain in 1948 and provided crucial information. New calculations based on this meant that the layout of the graphite blocks, which were already being machined, had to be changed. The two Windscale reactors became operational in October 1950 and June 1951. Due to faulty calculations at the design stage, the reactors did not produce the expected output. As a result, extraordinary measures had to be taken to provide Penney with a first shipment of plutonium in June 1952, and sufficient quantity for a core by the 1 August 1952 deadline. Improvements in the bomb design ultimately meant that he could get by with 15 per cent less plutonium. Starting in 1953, the Windscale reactors were able to use slightly enriched uranium as a fuel. They were shut down after the Windscale fire in October 1957.

=== Plutonium processing facility ===
Cartridges of uranium were irradiated in the Windscale reactors to produce plutonium. The cartridges were pushed through the reactor, and exited on the other side, where they fell into submerged steel skips which were pulled into a deep cooling pond. After being irradiated, each cartridge contained as many as 180 isotopes of 35 different chemical elements. Less than half of one per cent of the feed would have been converted to plutonium, but about 5 per cent was now radioactive fission products, the remainder being slightly depleted uranium. After being stored underwater for 150 days, the short-lived isotopes had decayed, leaving significant quantities of about 20 radioactive isotopes. Using remote handling, the cartridges were placed in lead-lined "coffins" and transported to the chemical separation plant.

At Hanford, the Americans had used a bismuth phosphate process to separate the plutonium from the uranium. This was wasteful; the plutonium was retrieved, but the uranium was left in a state from which it could not easily be recovered. A team at the Montreal Laboratory investigated this problem, and had devised a new process similar to that used with uranium. They had tried out the process, which they believed could be employed on an industrial scale, to extract 20 mg of plutonium from a spent Hanford fuel rod. The cartridges were dissolved in nitric acid and dibutyl carbitol was used to remove the plutonium.

After 1946, the only source of plutonium was from the NRX reactor in Canada, and irradiated rods from there did not arrive in Britain until mid-1948. Nor would Harwell have been able to handle them if they had; a "hot" radioactive laboratory was not built until 1949, although a small hot laboratory was pressed into service in 1948. A pilot plant was established at the Chalk River Laboratories in Canada, which ran until 1950. Despite concerns over whether the process would work, numerous minor changes, and construction problems related to the steel used, the plant was completed on schedule in April 1951. The first active material was fed into the plant on 25 February 1952. The plant performed well for twelve years, exceeding its designed production targets, and was only decommissioned when a larger facility was required. The first plutonium billet was cast on 31 March 1952, but it was impure, and could not be used in a bomb. Further work at Harwell and Windscale was required to perfect the process.

=== Gaseous diffusion plant ===
The gaseous diffusion plant was the most complicated of all from an engineering point of view. Uranium hexafluoride gas was pumped into a cascade, becoming richer in uranium-235 at each stage as it passed through a series of membranes. Procuring the nickel powder used by the Manhattan Project was not a problem, as it came from a British firm. Once again, a Royal Ordnance Factory was chosen as the site, in this case ROF Capenhurst at Capenhurst, near Chester, which had the advantage of being only 25 miles (40 km) from Risley. One decision was that instead of producing uranium hexafluoride using elemental fluorine, which was difficult and hazardous to transport, it was produced at Springfields from chlorine trifluoride. This process was untried and did not work properly, and when production commenced in February 1952, the hexafluoride plant did not perform adequately. It had to be redesigned at a cost of £250,000. The gaseous diffusion plant at Capenhurst, which cost £14 million, started production in 1953, but only produced low-enriched uranium, and did not produce highly enriched uranium until 1954. By 1957 it was capable of producing 125 kg of highly enriched uranium per annum. British designs at this time used large amounts of enriched uranium; 87 kg for Green Bamboo, 117 kg for Orange Herald. At the end of 1961, having produced between 3.8 and 4.9 tonnes of highly enriched uranium, it was switched over to low-enriched uranium production for civil nuclear power.

== Bomb design ==
Key staff recruited to work at Fort Halstead included John Challens, who commenced on 1 January 1948. By mid-1948, it became clear that Penney's initial estimate that he would require 220 staff was wide of the mark, and that he would need nearly 500. This meant not only taking personnel from other projects, but scrapping some entirely. In October 1948, Penney submitted a request for developing a new, separate site for HER on grounds of safety, security and economy. This was approved, but it took another six months to locate a suitable site. An airbase, RAF South Cerney in Gloucestershire was chosen, but the RAF refused to relinquish the site. A former airbase, RAF Aldermaston, was then selected. At the same time, it was decided to separate HER from the Armaments Research Establishment (ARE). This resulted in a painful bureaucratic battle over personnel like Challens, whose expertise was wanted for research on both nuclear weapons and guided missiles. In the end, HER kept 25 of the 30 key personnel that ARE wanted, including Challens. The site was taken over on 1 April 1950. Penney became Chief Superintendent High Explosive Research (CSHER). The first stage of work at Aldermaston was completed in December 1951, but the plutonium processing building was only handed over in April 1952, the month that the first plutonium was due to arrive from Windscale. At the peak of construction in 1953, over 4,000 personnel were working on the site.

Implosion-type nuclear weapon design. In the center is the polonium-beryllium neutron initiator (red), surrounded by the plutonium hemispheres. There is a small air gap (white) and then the uranium tamper. Around that is the aluminium pusher (purple). This is encased in the explosive lenses (ochre).

The choice of plutonium for the fissile component of the bomb meant that Penney's HER team at Fort Halstead had to design an implosion-type nuclear weapon. The Los Alamos Laboratory had solved the problem of doing this with explosive lenses. The involvement of several British scientists gave HER a solid base of experience to work from. The British design would hew to that of the American Fat Man as closely as possible. An important change would be the substitution of RDX, an ARD product, for Composition B as the fast explosive component of the lenses; Baratol would still provide the slow component. This was handled by the explosives experts at Woolwich, who devised the machining processes and produced prototypes of the lenses and moulds. Production was then handled by two Royal Ordnance Factories. The first lenses were delivered in 1952, and there were enough for two sets for the Operation Hurricane assemblies. Woolwich provided the supercharge, the spherical shell of explosive that encases the tamper. Test firings of explosive lenses were conducted at Foulness by a team under the direction of Roy Pilgrim. To achieve near-simultaneous detonations of the lenses, the Americans had developed the exploding-bridgewire detonator; this had to be duplicated. Ernest Mott and Cecil Bean developed them, while Challens devised the firing circuits.

Work on the plutonium core had to wait until Windscale delivered sufficient product, which was not until late 1951. The uranium tamper proved more of a challenge for the metallurgists than anticipated, due to a shortage of machine tools and moulds, and difficulty with the vacuum furnace. The first spheres were cast in December 1951, and while they were spherical to within 0.75 thou (0.019 mm), there were some casting defects, and it was feared they would hinder the implosion process. The defects were repaired, and two castings were prepared for Operation Hurricane. Work on plutonium chemistry and metallurgy was carried out at Harwell, as the hot laboratory at Aldermaston was not completed until May 1952. The first plutonium billet was cast there from plutonium nitrate from the Chalk River Laboratories in 1951. The metallurgists chose to alloy the plutonium with gallium to stabilise it in the malleable δ phase allotrope. Not until the first billet arrived from Harwell in 1951 were they able to confirm that this was practical. The first plutonium at Aldermaston was cast in an argon atmosphere in a cerium sulphide crucible.

The other radioactive element in use was polonium, which was used in the initiator. It was one of the parts of the Manhattan Project that the British mission had not been involved in, and little was known about its chemistry and properties, except that it had a half-life of 138 days. A disturbing discovery was that motes of polonium could propel themselves through the air using their own alpha particle emissions. Safety procedures had to be tightened. It was produced at Windscale by irradiation of bismuth. A special plant was built there to extract it, but it was not operational until June 1952. The final product was just 500 curies (18,000 GBq) of polonium, less than 1 mg. It was only just available on time for Operation Hurricane.

A small RAF team that eventually numbered ten men was assigned to liaise with HER, under the command of Wing Commander John Rowlands. He was answerable to a committee at the Air Ministry, codenamed "Herod". They considered how atomic bombing missions would be flown, and prepared training courses and manuals on how the production weapon, codenamed Blue Danube, would be stored, handled and maintained. The ballistic casing of the bomb was designed at Farnborough. Rowlands was responsible for an important design change. For safety reasons, he wanted the core inserted like a plug while the bomber was in flight. Fuchs performed calculations of the nuclear physics involved at Harwell in 1948, and produced an alternative design that, while untried, could be used. The new British design incorporated a levitated pit, in which there was an air gap between the uranium tamper and the plutonium core. This gave the explosion time to build up momentum, similar in principle to a hammer hitting a nail.

== Testing ==
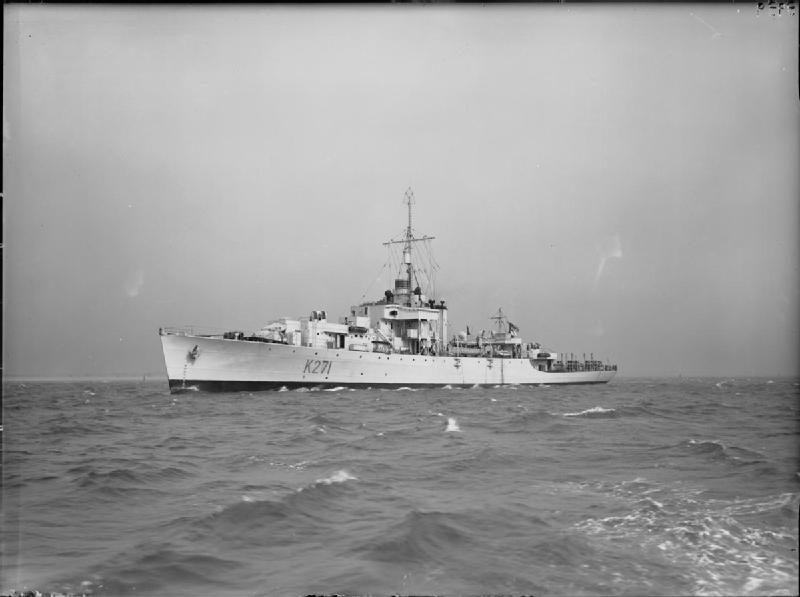
HMS Plym in 1943

Implicit in the decision to develop atomic bombs was the need to test them. The preferred site was the American Pacific Proving Grounds. As a fallback, sites in Canada and Australia were considered. In September 1950, the Admiralty suggested that the Monte Bello Islands in Australia might be suitable, so Attlee sent a request to the Prime Minister of Australia, Robert Menzies, for permission to send a survey party to have a look at the islands. Menzies agreed, and in November 1950, a three-man party headed by Air Vice Marshal E. D. Davis was sent out to the islands. The Australian government formally agreed to the islands being used in May 1951, and in December 1951 the new British government under Winston Churchill confirmed the choice of test site. On 26 February 1952 Churchill announced in the House of Commons that the first British atomic bomb test would occur in Australia before the end of the year.

A small fleet was assembled for Operation Hurricane that included the aircraft carrier HMS Campania, which served as the flagship, and the LSTs Narvik, Zeebrugge and Tracker, under the command of Rear Admiral A. D. Torlesse. Leonard Tyte from Aldermaston was appointed the technical director. The bomb assemblies for Operation Hurricane were assembled at Foulness, and then taken to the frigate HMS Plym on 5 June 1952 for transport to Australia. It took Campania and Plym eight weeks to make the voyage, as they sailed around the Cape of Good Hope to avoid traversing the Suez Canal, as there was unrest in Egypt at the time. The Monte Bello Islands were reached on 8 August. They were joined by eleven Royal Australian Navy ships, including the aircraft carrier HMAS Sydney. The plutonium core went by air, flying from RAF Lyneham to Singapore in a Handley Page Hastings aircraft via Cyprus, Sharjah and Ceylon. From Singapore they made the final leg of their journey in a Short Sunderland flying boat. Penney arrived by air on 22 September.

The bomb was successfully detonated on board Plym at 09:29:24 on 3 October 1952 local time (23:59:24 on 2 October 1952 UTC). The explosion occurred 2.7 metres (8 ft 10 in) below the water line, and left a saucer-shaped crater on the seabed 6 metres (20 ft) deep and 300 metres (980 ft) across. The yield was estimated at 25 kilotons of TNT (100 TJ).

== Delivery systems ==
A July 1945 Tizard Committee report foresaw the advent of long-range rockets and pilotless aircraft, but did not envision them as likely within ten years, and therefore urged the development of long-range jet bombers. In 1946, the RAF's front line bomber was the Avro Lincoln, a development of the wartime Avro Lancaster. It did not have the range to reach targets in the Soviet Union, nor could it deal with jet fighter interceptors. Operational Requirement (OR229) called for a high-altitude jet bomber with a range of 1,500 nautical miles (2,800 km; 1,700 mi) carrying an atomic bomb. The 9 August 1946 requirement for an atomic bomb (OR1001) specified that it be not more than 24 feet (7.3 m) in length or 5 feet (1.5 m) in diameter, and weigh no more than 10,000 pounds (4,500 kg).

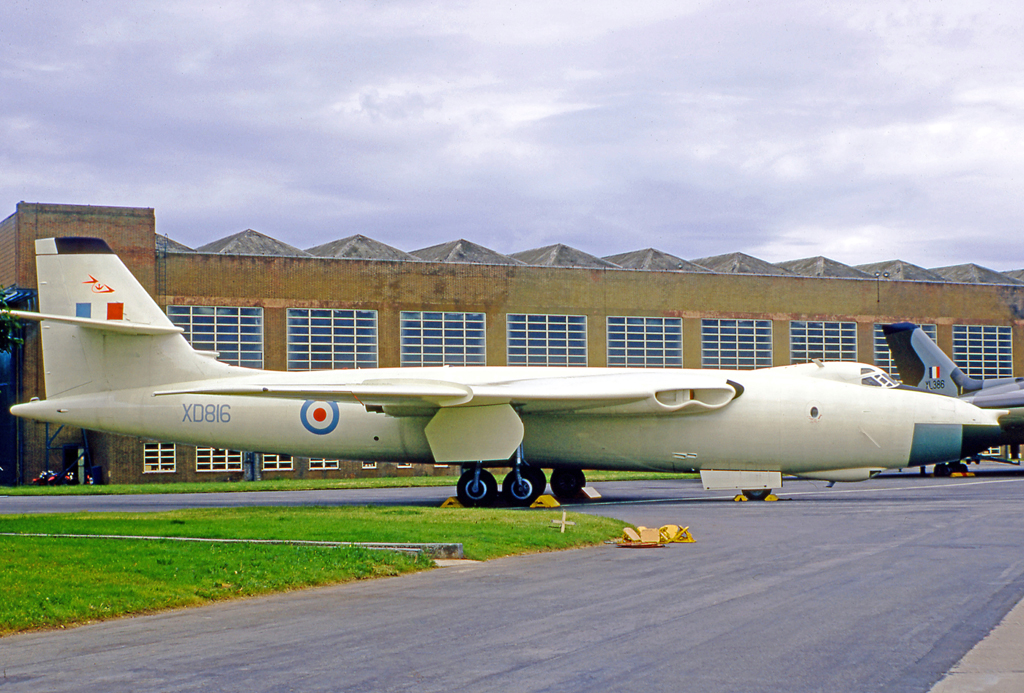
A Vickers Valiant in anti-flash white

OR229 was approved by the Operational Requirements Committee on 17 December 1946, and the Ministry of Supply sent out letters inviting tenders on 8 January 1947. Three bombers resulted from OR229: the Vickers Valiant, Avro Vulcan and Handley Page Victor, known as the V bombers. The high priority accorded to the atomic bomb programme was not shared by the V bomber programme. Vickers was given the first production order for 25 Valiants on 9 February 1951, and they were delivered on 8 February 1955. The Vulcan and Victor followed, entering service in 1956 and 1957 respectively. Thus, when the first Blue Danube atomic bombs were delivered to the Bomber Command Armaments School at RAF Wittering on 7 and 11 November 1953, the RAF had no bombers capable of carrying them. Penney noted that "the RAF has handled aircraft for a long time and can fly Valiants as soon as they come off the production line. But the Royal Air Force has not yet handled atomic weapons, therefore, we must get some bombs to the RAF at the earliest possible moment, so that the handling and servicing can be practised and fully worked out." For the time being, the United Kingdom remained dependent on the American nuclear umbrella.

On 5 November 1953, the Air and Naval Staffs therefore issued an Operational Requirement (OR1127) for a smaller, lighter atomic bomb capable of being carried by their English Electric Canberra, Gloster Javelin and Supermarine Scimitar aircraft. Aldermaston commenced work on the new bomb, codenamed Red Beard, in 1954. It had a composite uranium-plutonium core, and used air lenses to reduce its dimensions while still having a yield of 10 kilotons. Indeed, later boosted versions had yields of up to 100 kilotons. Red Beard weighed 1,650 pounds (750 kg), about a fifth of Blue Danube, was 12 feet 10 inches (3.91 m) long and 28 inches (710 mm) in diameter. It was tested in the Operation Buffalo British nuclear tests at Maralinga in September and October 1956, but various problems encountered meant that deliveries of production versions to the RAF and Royal Navy did not occur until 1960.

== Outcome ==
In 1951, Penney wrote that "the discriminative test for a first-class power is whether it has made an atomic bomb and we have either got to pass the test or suffer a serious loss of prestige both inside this country and internationally." There was fear of being left behind, and hope that the United States would be sufficiently impressed to resume the Special Relationship. The successful test of an atomic bomb represented an extraordinary technological achievement. Britain became the world's third nuclear power.

High Explosive Research achieved its objective with remarkable economy and efficiency, but the price was still high. Between 1946 and 1953, Risley spent £72 million, Harwell almost £27 million and the weapons establishment over £9.5 million. By comparison, British defence expenditure in 1948 was £600 million. HER accounted for 11 per cent of the Ministry of Supply's expenditure between 1946 and 1953. It had bi-partisan and popular support. Given Britain's dire financial position, thought turned to replacing conventional forces with atomic bombs. While certainly expensive, they could deliver extraordinary destructive power at relatively low cost. The concept of deterrence began to evolve, based on experiences dating back to the Great War. There were also technological spin-offs. The possession of nuclear reactors, the means to produce nuclear fuels and a repository of scientific knowledge led to the creation of a vast nuclear power industry.

Yet all the while Britain strived for independence, at the same time it sought interdependence in the form of a renewal of the Special Relationship with the United States. This was desired more than ever, as other countries recovered from the war and once again began to challenge Britain's status. As successful as it was, High Explosive Research fell short on both counts. The technology demonstrated at Monte Bello in October 1952 was already seven years old. The following month the United States tested Ivy Mike, a thermonuclear device. The British government would now have to decide whether to initiate its own hydrogen bomb programme. Penney, for one, feared that this would likely prove to be beyond the financial resources of Britain's war-ravaged economy. The successful British hydrogen bomb programme, and a favourable international relations climate caused by the Sputnik crisis, led to amendment of the United States Atomic Energy Act in 1958, and a resumption of the nuclear Special Relationship between America and Britain under the 1958 US–UK Mutual Defence Agreement.
