= K271 =

K271 or K-271 may refer to:

- K-271 (Kansas highway), a former state highway in Kansas
- HMS Plym (K271), a former UK Royal Navy ship
- Piano Concerto No. 9 (Mozart), (K. 271)
