= HMAS Limicola =

History

Australia
- Name: Limicola
- Namesake: Scolopacidae (eg Limicola falcinellus)

General characteristics
- Installed power: diesel engine

HMAS Limicola was a small ship of the Royal Australian Navy during World War II, serving as an Anti-submarine indicator loop repair ship. Limicola was a "ship taken up from trade" (STUFT) during the War.

It served until at least 1952 when, in October of that year, it was involved in Operation Hurricane, the British nuclear bomb test in the lagoon in the Montebello Islands off Western Australia’s Pilbara region.

Limicola is a name from the Latin meaning "one that dwells in the mud". There are various birds with this word in their scientific name, notably in the Scolopacidae (waders and shorebirds), such as the broad-billed sandpiper (Limicola falcinellus). Limicolaria are land snails.
