= Arthur David Torlesse =

Royal Navy Rear Admiral (1902–1995)

Rear-Admiral Arthur David Torlesse CB DSO
- Born: 24 January 1902; Bognor Regis, West Sussex
- Died: 19 July 1995 (aged 93); Lymington, Hampshire
- Military career
- Allegiance: United Kingdom
- Branch: Royal Navy
- Service years: 1915–1954
- Rank: Rear-Admiral
- Commands: Flag Officer, Ground Training (1953–54); HMS Triumph (1949–50); HMS Hunter (1944–45)
- Conflicts: First World War; Second World War; Korean War
- Awards: Companion of the Order of the Bath; Distinguished Service Order; Mentioned in Despatches; Officer of the Legion of Merit (United States)

Rear-Admiral Arthur David Torlesse, CB, DSO (24 January 1902 – 19 July 1995) was a Royal Navy officer. He commanded the escort carrier HMS Hunter during the latter part of the Second World War, and the aircraft carrier HMS Triumph during the early months of the Korean War. In 1952, he commanded the task force that supported Operation Hurricane, the first British nuclear weapons test.

== Early life and career ==
Arthur David Torlesse was born in Bognor Regis in West Sussex on 24 January 1902, the son of a Royal Navy officer, Captain Arthur Ward Torlesse, and his wife Harriet Mary (née Jeans). He had a brother, Ynyr John Torlesse. He was educated at Park High School, Stanmore, Royal Naval College, Osborne, which he entered in 1915, and Royal Naval College, Dartmouth. He served as a midshipman with the Grand Fleet during the First World War.

Torlesse was commissioned as a sub-lieutenant on 15 May 1922, and served on HMS Watchman. He was promoted to lieutenant on 15 June 1923. He joined the crew of the aircraft carrier HMS Hermes on 28 May 1925, and qualified as an air observer with the Fleet Air Arm. In this role he subsequently served on HMS Furious in 1927 and then joined HMS Courageous in 1928, where he was serving when promoted to lieutenant commander on 18 August 1931. He married Sheila Mary Susan Darroch, the daughter of Lieutenant Colonel Duncan Darroch, 6th of Gourock, a retired Army officer of the Argyll and Sutherland Highlanders, on 29 April 1933. They two sons, Charles David and Anthony John, and a daughter, Susan.

After attending the staff course at the Royal Naval College, Greenwich, Torlesse became operations officer on the staff of the Commander-in-Chief, Home Fleet, on the battleship HMS Nelson in July 1935. He was promoted to commander on 31 December. After attending a tactical course at HM Dockyard, Portsmouth, in 1936, he was served on the battlecruiser HMS Hood. This was followed by a posting to the Far East as the operations officer on the staff of Commodore, Malaya, based at the Singapore Naval Base, and for a time he was also the Naval Attaché to Thailand in Bangkok.

== Second World War ==
Returning to Britain, Torlesse became executive officer of the cruiser HMS Suffolk on 6 July 1939. He joined the staff of Rear Admiral, Naval Air Stations at HMNS Daedalus (also known as RNAS Lee-on-Solent) on 8 July 1940. On 12 January 1942, he became an Assistant Director of Naval Air Division at the Admiralty. He was promoted to captain on 30 June. On 1 February 1943, he became the Deputy Director of Naval Air Warfare and Flying Training Division at the Admiralty.

Torlesse's first command came on 10 November 1944, when he became captain of the escort carrier HMS Hunter, which became part of the Eastern Fleet. Hunter supported Operation Dracula, the amphibious attack on Rangoon, and, after the war ended, Operation Zipper, the reoccupation of Singapore. Hunter was present in Singapore for the Japanese surrender before returning to Britain in October 1945, and being returned to the United States Navy on 29 December. For his services, Torlesse was made a Companion of the Distinguished Service Order on 28 December.

== Korea ==
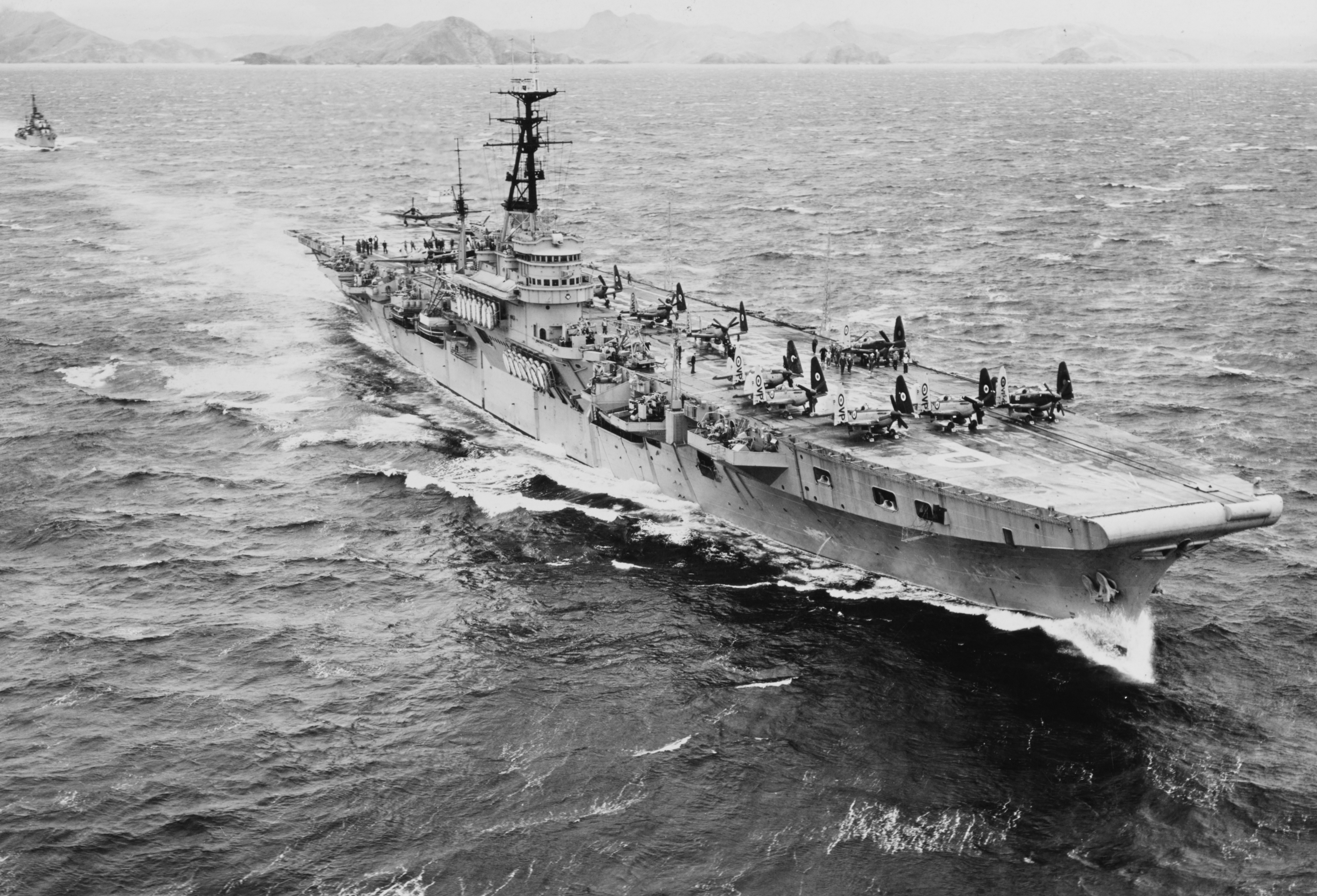
HMS Triumph underway off Subic Bay, Philippines, during exercises on 8 March 1950. Aircraft on her deck include Supermarine Seafires, forward, and Fairey Fireflys aft.

Torlesse returned to the Admiralty, where he became Director of the Airfields and Carrier Requirements Department on 1 March 1946, and then Director of the Air Equipment Department on 17 May 1948. On 7 December 1949, he became captain of the aircraft carrier HMS Triumph, which saw active service in the early months of the Korean War, including supporting Operation Chromite, the American landings at Incheon. Torlesse was mentioned in despatches on 30 January 1951, and was made an Officer of the American Legion of Merit on 13 August 1954.

== Operation Hurricane and after ==
Promoted to rear admiral on 7 July 1951, Torlesse was placed in change of a small fleet assembled for Operation Hurricane, the first test of a British atomic bomb. His command included the escort carrier HMS Campania, which served as his flagship, the LSTs Narvik, Zeebrugge and Tracker, and the River-class frigate HMS Plym, which would act as a target ship. The bomb was assembled at Foulness, and then taken to Plym on 5 June 1952 for transport to the Monte Bello Islands in Australia, where the test would take place. It took Campania and Plym eight weeks to make the voyage, as for security reasons they sailed around the Cape of Good Hope instead of traversing the Suez Canal. The Monte Bello Islands were reached on 8 August.

The bomb was successfully detonated on board Plym on 3 October 1952. For his part, Torlesse was made a Companion of the Order of the Bath on 30 December. His final posting was as Flag Officer, Ground Training. He retired on 16 December 1954. He served for a time as a regional director of civil defence.

Torlesse died in Lymington, Hampshire, on 19 July 1995.
