= Flag Officer, Ground Training =

- Ensign of the Royal Navy
- Admiralty, Ministry of Defence
- Reports to: Flag Officer, Air (Home), Flag Officer Naval Air Command
- Nominator: First Sea Lord
- Appointer: Prime Minister; Subject to formal approval by the Queen-in-Council
- Term length: Not fixed (typically 1–3 years)
- Inaugural holder: Rear-Admiral Douglas H. Everett
- Formation: January 1949–1957

The Flag Officer, Ground Training was a senior Royal Navy appointment responsible for all naval aviation ground training from 1949 to 1957.

== History ==
The post was established in January 1949 following the abolition of the office of Flag Officer, Carrier Training in 1945 that commands responsibilities were divided to creating subordinate commands each concentrating specific areas of responsibility. The post was abolished in 1957. The office holder reported to Flag Officer, Air (Home).

== Responsibilities ==
Included:

Administration of six Naval Air Stations at:

- RNAS Lee-on-Solent (HMS Daedalus)
- RNAS Arbroath – (HMS Condor)
- RNAS Bramcote – (HMS Gamecock)
- RNAS Gosport – (HMS Siskin)
- RNAS Worthy Down – (Kestral -HMS Ariel)
- RNAS St Merryn (HMS Vulture).

Administration of

- Royal Naval Barracks at Lee-on-the-Solent.

== Flag Officers, Ground Training ==
Post holders included:

- Rear-Admiral Douglas H. Everett: January 1949 – May 1951
- Rear-Admiral Cecil R.L. Parry: May 1951 – May 1953
- Rear-Admiral Arthur D. Torlesse: May 1953 – November 1954
- Rear-Admiral Ralph L. Fisher: November 1954 – 1957
