= Operation Hurricane =

1952 British atomic bomb test in Western Australia

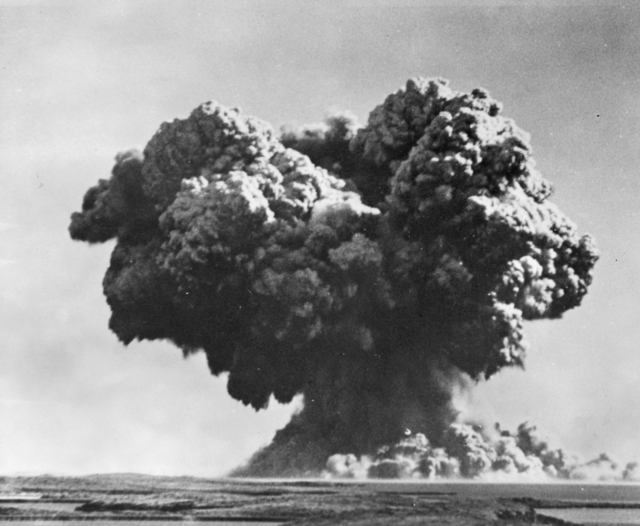
- The mud-laden cauliflower explosion
- Site of nuclear weapons test is about 220 metres (720 ft) off Trimouille Island, about 140 kilometres (87 mi) west-northwest of Karratha

Information
- Country: United Kingdom
- Test site: Trimouille Island, Montebello Islands, Western Australia; 20°24′19″S 115°33′59″E
- Date: 23:59:24 UTC, 2 October 1952
- Number of tests: 1
- Test type: Ship
- Max. yield: 25 kt (100 TJ)

Test series chronology

Operation Hurricane was the first test of a British atomic device. A plutonium implosion device was detonated on 3 October 1952 in Main Bay, Trimouille Island, in the Montebello Islands in Western Australia. With the success of Operation Hurricane, the United Kingdom became the third nuclear power, after the United States and the Soviet Union.

During the Second World War, Britain commenced a nuclear weapons project, code-named Tube Alloys, but the 1943 Quebec Agreement merged it with the American Manhattan Project. Several key British scientists worked on the Manhattan Project, but after the war the American government ended cooperation on nuclear weapons. In January 1947, a cabinet sub-committee decided to resume British efforts to build nuclear weapons, in response to an apprehension of American isolationism and fears of Britain losing its great power status. The project was called High Explosive Research, and was directed by Lord Portal, with William Penney in charge of bomb design.

Implicit in the decision to develop atomic bombs was the need to test them. The preferred site was the Pacific Proving Grounds in the US-controlled Marshall Islands. As a fallback, sites in Canada and Australia were considered. The Admiralty suggested that the Montebello Islands might be suitable, so the prime minister of the United Kingdom, Clement Attlee, sent a request to the prime minister of Australia, Robert Menzies. The Australian government formally agreed to the islands being used as a nuclear test site in May 1951. In February 1952, Attlee's successor, Winston Churchill, announced in the House of Commons that the first British atomic bomb test would occur in Australia before the end of the year.

A small fleet was assembled for Operation Hurricane under the command of Rear Admiral A. D. Torlesse; it included the escort carrier HMS Campania, which served as the flagship, and the LSTs Narvik, Zeebrugge and Tracker. Leonard Tyte from the Atomic Weapons Research Establishment at Aldermaston was appointed the technical director. The bomb for Operation Hurricane was assembled (without its radioactive components) at Foulness and taken to the frigate HMS Plym for transport to Australia. On reaching the Montebello Islands, the five Royal Navy ships were joined by eleven Royal Australian Navy ships, including the aircraft carrier HMAS Sydney. To test the effects of a ship-smuggled atomic bomb on a port (a threat of great concern to the British at the time), the bomb was exploded inside the hull of Plym, anchored 350 metres (1,150 ft) off Trimouille Island. The explosion occurred 2.7 metres (8 ft 10 in) below the water line and left a saucer-shaped crater on the seabed 6 metres (20 ft) deep and 300 metres (980 ft) across.

== Background ==
Location of the Montebello Islands

The December 1938 discovery of nuclear fission by Otto Hahn and Fritz Strassmann—and its explanation and naming by Lise Meitner and Otto Frisch—raised the possibility that an extremely powerful "atomic bomb" could be created. During the Second World War, Frisch and Rudolf Peierls at the University of Birmingham calculated the critical mass of a metallic sphere of pure uranium-235, and found that instead of tonnes, as everyone had assumed, as little as 1 to 10 kilograms (2 to 22 lb) would suffice, which would explode with the power of thousands of tonnes of dynamite. In response, Britain initiated an atomic bomb project, codenamed Tube Alloys.

At the Quebec Conference in August 1943, the prime minister of the United Kingdom, Winston Churchill, and the president of the United States, Franklin Roosevelt, signed the Quebec Agreement, which merged Tube Alloys with the American Manhattan Project to create a combined British, American and Canadian project. The British contribution to the Manhattan Project included assistance in the development of gaseous diffusion technology at the SAM Laboratories in New York, and the electromagnetic separation process at the Berkeley Radiation Laboratory. John Cockcroft became the director of the joint British-Canadian Montreal Laboratory. A British mission to the Los Alamos Laboratory led by James Chadwick, and later Peierls, included scientists such as Geoffrey Taylor, James Tuck, Niels Bohr, William Penney, Frisch, Ernest Titterton, and Klaus Fuchs, who was later revealed to be a spy for the Soviet Union. As overall head of the British Mission, Chadwick forged a close and successful partnership with Brigadier General Leslie R. Groves, the director of the Manhattan Project, and ensured that British participation was complete and wholehearted.

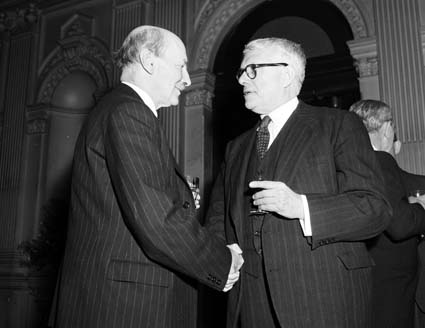
Clement Attlee (left) with the Leader of the Australian Federal Opposition, Dr H. V. Evatt in 1954

With the end of the war the Special Relationship between Britain and the United States "became very much less special". The British government had trusted that America would share nuclear technology, which the British saw as a joint discovery, but the terms of the Quebec Agreement remained secret. Senior members of the United States Congress were horrified when they discovered that it gave the British a veto over the use of nuclear weapons. On 9 November 1945, the new prime minister of the United Kingdom, Clement Attlee, and the prime minister of Canada, William Lyon Mackenzie King, went to Washington, D.C., to confer with Truman about future cooperation in nuclear weapons and nuclear power. They signed a Memorandum of Intention that replaced the Quebec Agreement. It made Canada a full partner, and reduced the obligation to obtain consent for the use of nuclear weapons to merely requiring consultation. The three leaders agreed that there would be full and effective cooperation on civil and military applications of atomic energy, but the British were soon disappointed; the Americans made it clear that cooperation was restricted to basic scientific research. The Atomic Energy Act of 1946 (McMahon Act) ended technical cooperation. Its control of "restricted data" prevented the United States' allies from receiving any information.

Attlee set up a cabinet sub-committee, the Gen 75 Committee (known informally as the "Atomic Bomb Committee"), on 10 August 1945 to examine the feasibility of a nuclear weapons program. In October 1945, it accepted a recommendation that responsibility be placed within the Ministry of Supply. The Tube Alloys Directorate was transferred from the Department of Scientific and Industrial Research to the Ministry of Supply on 1 November 1945. To coordinate the effort, Lord Portal, the wartime Chief of the Air Staff, was appointed Controller of Production, Atomic Energy (CPAE), with direct access to the prime minister. An Atomic Energy Research Establishment (AERE) was established at RAF Harwell, south of Oxford, under the directorship of Cockcroft. AERE moved to Aldermaston in 1952. Christopher Hinton agreed to oversee the design, construction and operation of the new atomic weapons facilities. These included a new uranium plant at Springfields in Lancashire, and nuclear reactors and plutonium processing facilities at Windscale in Cumbria. Hinton established his headquarters in a former Royal Ordnance Factory at Risley in Lancashire on 4 February 1946.

In July 1946, the Chiefs of Staff Committee recommended that Britain acquire nuclear weapons. They estimated that 200 bombs would be required by 1957. Despite this, and the research and construction of production facilities that had already been approved, there was still no official decision to proceed with making atomic bombs. Portal submitted a proposal to do so at the 8 January 1947 meeting of the Gen 163 Committee, a subcommittee of the Gen 75 Committee, which agreed to proceed with the development of atomic bombs. It also endorsed his proposal to place Penney, now the Chief Superintendent Armament Research (CSAR) at Fort Halstead in Kent, in charge of the bomb development effort, which was codenamed High Explosive Research. Penney contended that "the discriminative test for a first-class power is whether it has made an atomic bomb and we have either got to pass the test or suffer a serious loss of prestige both inside this country and internationally."

Although the British government had committed to the development of an independent nuclear deterrent, it still hoped for a restoration of the nuclear Special Relationship with the Americans. It was therefore important that nothing be done that would jeopardise this.

== Site selection ==
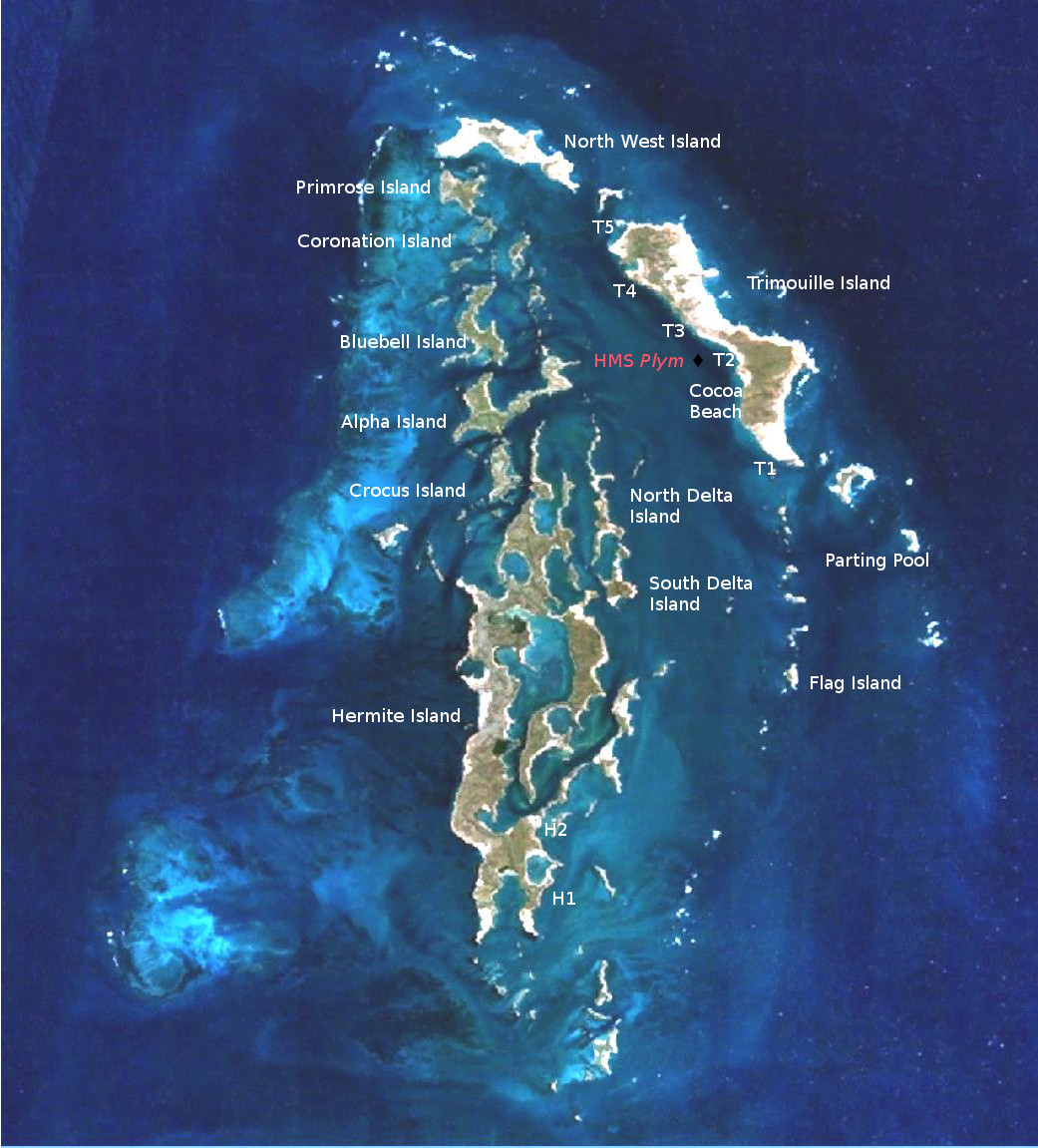
Captioned satellite image of the Montebello Islands

Implicit in the decision to develop atomic bombs was the need to test them. Lacking open, thinly-populated areas, British officials considered locations overseas. The preferred site was the American Pacific Proving Grounds. A request to use it was sent to the American Joint Chiefs of Staff in 1949. In October 1950 the Americans turned down the request. As a fallback, sites in Canada and Australia were considered. Penney spoke to Omond Solandt, the chairman of the Canadian Defence Research Board, and they arranged for a joint feasibility study.

The study noted several requirements for a test area:

- an isolated area with no human habitation 160 kilometres (100 mi) downwind;
- large enough to accommodate a dozen detonations over a period of several years;
- with prevailing winds that would blow fallout out to sea but away from shipping lanes;
- a temporary camp site at least 16 kilometres (10 mi) upwind of the detonation area;
- a base camp site at least 40 kilometres (25 mi) upwind of the detonation area, with room for laboratories, workshops and signals equipment;
- ready for use by mid-1952.

The first test would probably be a ground burst, but consideration was also given to an explosion in a ship to measure the effect of a ship-borne atomic bomb on a major port. Such data would complement that obtained about an underwater explosion by the American Operation Crossroads nuclear test in 1946, and would therefore be of value to the Americans. Seven Canadian sites were assessed, the most promising being Churchill, Manitoba, but the waters were too shallow to allow ships to approach close to shore.

In September 1950, the Admiralty suggested that the uninhabited Montebello Islands in Australia might be suitable, so Attlee obtained permission from the prime minister of Australia, Robert Menzies, to send a survey party to look at the islands, which are about 80 kilometres (50 mi) and 130 kilometres (81 mi) from Onslow. Major General James Cassels, the Chief Liaison Officer with the United Kingdom Services Liaison Staff (UKSLS) in Melbourne, was designated the principal British contact in Australia, and Menzies nominated Sir Frederick Shedden, the Secretary of the Department of Defence, as the person with whom Cassels should deal.

At the time Britain was still Australia's largest trading partner; it would be overtaken by Japan and the United States by the 1960s. Britain and Australia had strong cultural ties, and Menzies was strongly pro-British. Most Australians were of British descent, and Britain was still the largest source of immigrants to Australia, largely because British ex-servicemen and their families qualified for free passage, and other British migrants received subsidised passage. Australian and British troops were fighting communist forces together in the Korean War and the Malayan Emergency. Australia still maintained close defence ties with Britain through the Australia New Zealand and Malaya (ANZAM) area, which was created in 1948. Australian war plans of this era continued to be closely integrated with those of Britain, and involved reinforcing the British forces in the Middle East and Far East.

Australia was particularly interested in developing atomic energy as the country was then thought to have no oil and only limited supplies of coal. Plans for atomic power were considered along with hydroelectricity as part of the post-war Snowy Mountains Scheme. There was also interest in the production of uranium-235 and plutonium for nuclear weapons. The Australian government had hopes of collaboration with Britain on nuclear energy and nuclear weapons, but the 1948 Modus Vivendi cut Australian scientists off from information they had formerly had access to. Unlike Canada, Australia was not a party to the Quebec Agreement or the Modus Vivendi. Britain would not share technical information with Australia for fear that it might jeopardise its far more important relationship with the United States, and the Americans were reluctant to share secret information with Australia after the Venona project revealed the extent of Soviet espionage activities in Australia. The creation of NATO in 1949 excluded Australia from the Western Alliance.

The three-man survey party, headed by Air Vice Marshal E. D. Davis, arrived in Sydney on 1 November 1950, and embarked on HMAS Karangi, under the command of Commander A. H. Cooper, who carried out a detailed hydrographic survey of the islands. The charts at the Admiralty had been made by HMS Beagle in August 1840. Soundings were taken of the depths of coastal waters to measure the tides, and samples of the gravel and sand were taken to assess whether they could be used for making concrete. The work afloat and ashore was complemented by Royal Australian Air Force (RAAF) aerial photography of the islands. The British survey team returned to London on 29 November 1950. The islands were assessed as suitable for atomic testing, but, for climatic reasons, only in October.

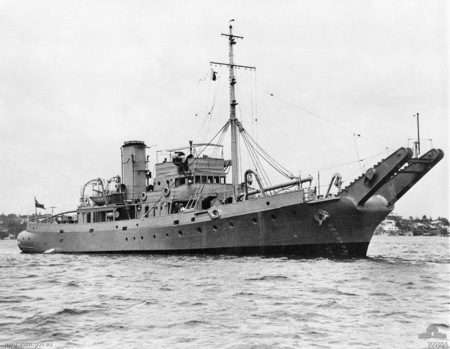
HMAS Karangi was used as a survey ship.

On 27 March 1951, Attlee sent Menzies a personal message saying that, while negotiations with the United States for use of the Nevada Test Site were ongoing, work would need to begin if the Montebello Islands were to be used in October 1952. Menzies replied that he could not authorise the test until after the Australian federal election, to be held on 28 April 1951, but was willing to allow work to continue. Menzies was re-elected, and the Australian government formally agreed in May 1951. On 28 May, Attlee sent a comprehensive list of assistance that it hoped that Australia would provide. A more detailed survey was requested, which was carried out by HMAS Warrego in July and August 1951. The British government emphasised the importance of security, so as not to imperil its negotiations with the United States. The Australian government gave all weapon design data a classification of "Top Secret", other aspects of the test being "Classified". Nuclear weapons design was already covered by a D notice in the United Kingdom. Australian D Notice No. 8 was issued to cover nuclear tests.

Meanwhile, negotiations continued with the Americans. Oliver Franks, the British Ambassador to the United States, lodged a formal request on 2 August 1951 for use of the Nevada Test Site. This was looked upon favourably by the United States secretary of state, Dean Acheson, and the chairman of the United States Atomic Energy Commission, Gordon Dean, but opposed by Robert A. Lovett, the American Deputy Secretary of Defense and Robert LeBaron, the Deputy Secretary of Defence for Atomic Energy Affairs. The British government had announced on 7 June 1951 that Donald Maclean, who had served as a British member of the Combined Policy Committee from January 1947 to August 1948, had been a Soviet spy. In view of security concerns, Lovett and LeBaron wanted the tests to be conducted by Americans, British participation being limited to Penney and a few selected British scientists. Truman endorsed this counterproposal on 24 September 1951.

The Nevada Test Site would be cheaper than Montebello, although the cost would be paid in scarce dollars. Information gathered would have to be shared with the Americans, who would not share their own data. It would not be possible to test from a ship, and the political advantages in demonstrating that Britain could develop and test nuclear weapons without American assistance would be foregone. The Americans were under no obligation to make the test site available for subsequent tests. Also, as Lord Cherwell noted, an American test meant that "in the lamentable event of the bomb failing to detonate, we should look very foolish indeed."

A final decision was deferred until after the UK's 1951 election. This resulted in a change of government, the Conservative Party returning to power and Churchill replacing Attlee as prime minister. On 27 December 1951, the High Commissioner of the United Kingdom to Australia informed Menzies of the British government's decision to use Montebello. On 26 February 1952, Churchill announced in the House of Commons that the first British atomic bomb test would occur in Australia before the end of the year. When queried by a UK Labour Party backbencher, Emrys Hughes, about the impact on the local flora and fauna, Churchill joked that the survey team had only seen some birds and lizards. Among the AERE scientists was an amateur biologist, Frank Hill, who collected samples of the flora and fauna on the islands, teaming up with Commander G. Wedd, who collected marine specimens from the surrounding waters. In a paper published by the Linnean Society of London, Hill catalogued over 400 species of plants and animals. This included 20 new species of insects, six of plants, and a new species of legless lizard.

== Preparations ==
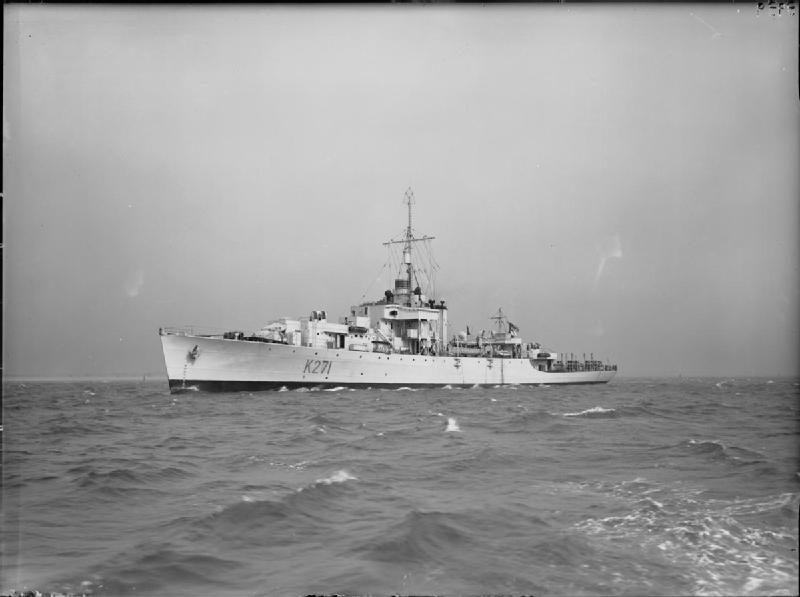
HMS Plym in 1943. The atomic bomb was exploded in her hull.

To coordinate the test, codenamed "Operation Hurricane", the British government established a Hurricane Executive Committee chaired by the Deputy Chief of the Naval Staff, Vice Admiral Edward Evans-Lombe. It held its first meeting in May 1951. To deal with it, an Australian Hurricane Panel was created, chaired by the Australian Deputy Chief of the Naval Staff, Captain Alan McNicoll. Its other members were Colonel John Wilton from the Australian Army, Group Captain Alister Murdoch from the RAAF and Charles Spry from Australian Security Intelligence Organisation (ASIO). Cassels or his representative was invited to attend its meetings. A pressing question was that of observers. Churchill decided to exclude the media and members of the UK parliament. As Canada was a party to the 1948 Modus Vivendi, Canadian scientists and technicians would have access to all technical data, but Australians would not.

Penney was anxious to secure the services of Titterton, who had recently emigrated to Australia, as he had worked on the American Trinity and Crossroads tests. Menzies asked the vice-chancellor of the Australian National University, Sir Douglas Copland, to release Titterton to work on Operation Hurricane. Cockcroft also wanted assistance from Leslie Martin, the Department of Defence's Science Advisor, who was also a professor of physics at the University of Melbourne, to work in the health physics area. The two men knew each other from their time at Cambridge University before the war. After some argument, Martin was accepted as an official observer, as was W. A. S. Butement, the Chief Scientist at the Department of Supply. The only other official observer was Solandt from Canada.

An advance party of No. 5 Airfield Construction Squadron from RAAF Base Williamtown, New South Wales, moved to Onslow in August 1951 with heavy construction equipment, taking the train to Geraldton and then the road to Onslow. This was then transported to the Montebello Islands. A prefabricated hut was taken across by Karangai, along with equipment for establishing a meteorological station. Other materiel was moved from Onslow to the islands in 45-cubic-metre (40 MTON) lots in an ALC-40 landing craft manned by the Australian Army and towed by Karangai. This included two 25-tonne (25-long-ton) bulldozers, a grader, tip trucks, portable generators, 1,800-litre (480 US gal) water tanks and a mobile radio transceiver. The hut was erected, and the meteorological station henceforth manned by an RAAF officer and four assistants. Roads and landings were constructed, and camp sites established.

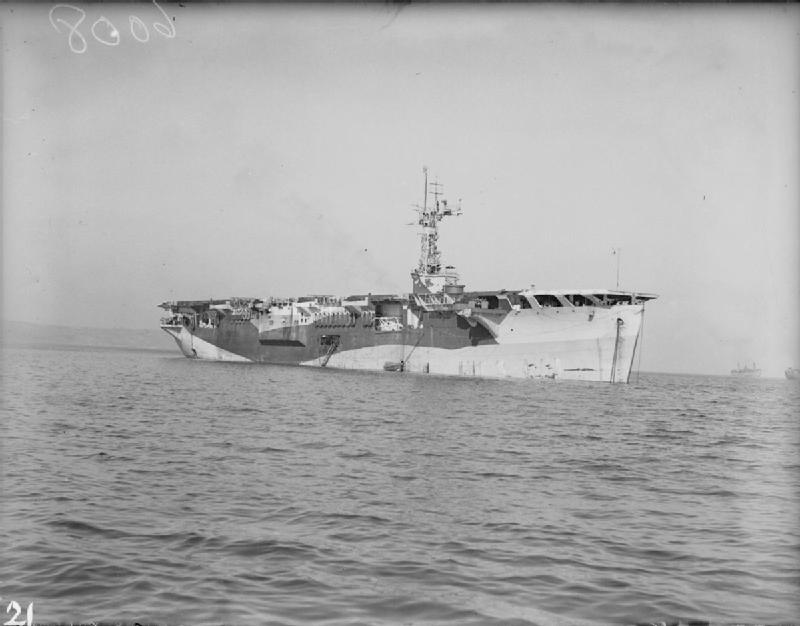
HMS Campania was the task force flagship.

The next stage of work began in February 1952, in the wake of the December decision to proceed with the test. A detachment of No. 5 Airfield Construction Squadron was flown to Onslow from RAAF Bankstown in two RAAF Dakota aircraft, and were then taken to the islands by the Bathurst-class corvette HMAS Mildura. Karangai fetched 100 cubic metres (90 MTON) of Marston Mat from Darwin that was used for road works and hardstands. The SS Dorrigo brought in another 100 cubic metres (90 MTON) three weeks later. A water supply was also developed. To bring water from the Fortescue River, a quantity of 100-millimetre (4 in) Victaulic-coupling pipe was brought from the Department of Works in Sydney and the Woomera Rocket Range in South Australia. Because the pipe was laid around obstacles, this proved to be insufficient. No more pipe was in storage, so a firm in Melbourne was asked to make some. An order was placed on a Friday evening, and the pipe was shipped the following Thursday morning, making its way to the Fortescue River by road and rail. The system delivered up to 15,000 litres (4,100 US gal) per hour to a jetty on the Fortescue estuary, from which it was taken to the islands by the 120ft Motor Lighter MWL 251.

The British assembled a small fleet for Operation Hurricane that included the escort carrier HMS Campania, which served as the flagship, and the LSTs Narvik, Zeebrugge and Tracker, under the command of Rear Admiral A. D. Torlesse. Leonard Tyte from the AERE was appointed the technical director. Campania had five aircraft embarked, three Westland WS-51 Dragonfly helicopters and two Supermarine Sea Otter amphibians. Between them, the LSTs carried five LCMs and twelve LCAs. The bomb, less its radioactive components, was assembled at Foulness, and then taken to the River-class frigate HMS Plym on 5 June 1952 for transport to Australia. It took Campania and Plym eight weeks to make the voyage, as they sailed around the Cape of Good Hope instead of traversing the Suez Canal to avoid the ongoing unrest in Egypt.

The Montebello Islands were reached on 8 August. Plym was anchored in 12 metres (39 ft) of water, 350 metres (1,150 ft) off Trimouille Island. The radioactive components, the plutonium core and polonium-beryllium neutron initiator, went by air, flying from RAF Lyneham to Singapore in Handley Page Hastings aircraft via Cyprus, Sharjah and Ceylon. From Singapore they made the final leg of their journey in a Short Sunderland flying boat. The British bomb design was similar to that of the American Fat Man, but for reasons of safety and efficiency the British design incorporated a levitated pit, in which there was an air gap between the uranium tamper and the plutonium core. This gave the explosion time to build up momentum, similar in principle to a hammer hitting a nail, enabling less plutonium to be used.

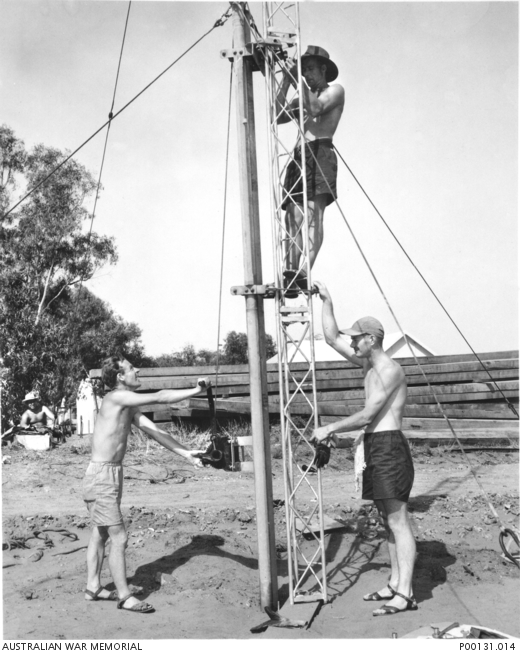
A radio antenna is erected for the test.

The British fleet was joined by eleven RAN ships, including the aircraft carrier HMAS Sydney with 805 and 817 Squadrons embarked, and its four escorts, the destroyer HMAS Tobruk, and frigates Shoalhaven, Macquarie and Murchison. The Defence (Special Undertakings) Act (1952) was passed through the Parliament of Australia between 4 and 6 June 1952, and received assent on 10 June. Under this act, the area within a 72-kilometre (45 mi) radius of Flag Island was declared a prohibited area for safety and security reasons. That some of this was outside Australia's 4.8-kilometre (3 mi) territorial waters attracted comment. The frigate HMAS Hawkesbury was tasked with patrolling the prohibited area, while its sister ship HMAS Culgoa acted as a weather ship. Logistical support was provided by HMAS Warreen, Limicola and Mildura, the motor water lighter MWL 251 and the motor refrigeration lighter MRL 252, and the tugboat HMAS Reserve, which towed a fuel barge. Dakotas of No. 86 Wing RAAF provided air patrols and a weekly courier run.

== Operation ==
The main site, known as H1, was established on the south-east corner of Hermite Island. This was the location of the control room from which the bomb would be detonated, along with the equipment to monitor the firing circuits and telemetry. It was also the location of the generators that provided electric power and recharged the batteries of portable devices, and ultra-high-speed cameras operating at up to 8,000 frames per second. Other camera equipment was set up on Alpha Island and Northwest Island. Most of the monitoring equipment was positioned on Trimouille Island, closer to the explosion. Here, there were a plethora of blast, pressure and seismographic gauges. There were also some 200 empty fuel containers for measuring the blast, a technique that Penney had employed on Operation Crossroads. There were thermometers and calorimeters for measuring the flash, and samples of paints and fabrics for determining the effect on them. Plants would be studied to measure their uptake of fission products, particularly radioactive iodine and strontium. Stores were unloaded at beachhead H2 on Hermite Island, between Brandy Bay and Buttercup Island, whence the RAAF had built a road to H1. A stores compound was established at Gladstone Beach on Trimouille Island, known as T3.

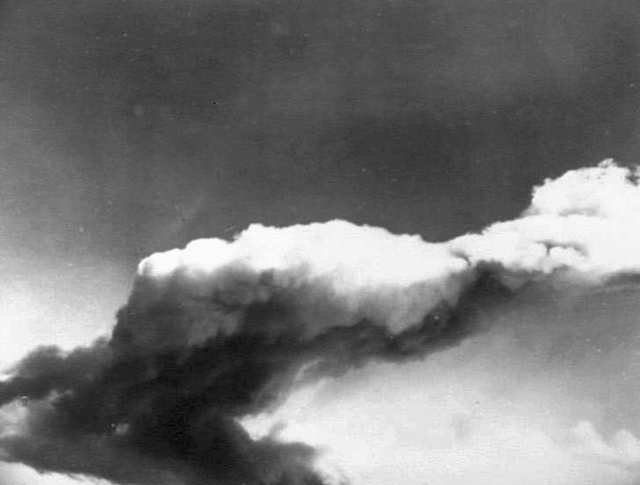
Cloud from Britain's first atomic bomb 30 minutes after the detonation

The original intention was that the scientists would stay on Campania, commuting to the islands each day, but the survey party had misjudged the tides; Campania could not enter the lagoon, and had to anchor in the Parting Pool. The pinnaces could not tie up alongside Campania at night, and had to be moored several miles away. Transferring to the boats in choppy waters was hazardous. One scientist fell in the sea and was rescued by Commander Douglas Bromley, Campania's executive officer. Rough seas prevented much work being done between 10 and 14 August. It took about an hour and a half to get from Campania to H2, and travelling between Plym and Campania took between two and three hours. Even when a boat was on call it could take 45 minutes to respond. Boat availability soon became a problem with only five LCMs, leaving personnel waiting for one to arrive. The twelve smaller LCAs were also employed; although they could operate when the tides made waters too shallow for the pinnaces, their wooden bottoms were easily holed by coral outcrops. On 15 August, some men were transferred from Campania by one of its three Dragonfly helicopters, but the weather closed in and they could not be picked up again, having to find shelter on Tracker and Zeebrugge, which were moored in the lagoon. To get around these problems, tented camps were established for the scientists at H1 on Hermite Island and Cocoa Beach (also known as T2) on Trimouille Island.

Scientific rehearsals were held on 12 and 13 September. This was followed by an operational rehearsal on 19 September, which included fully assembling the bomb, since the radioactive components had arrived the day before on a Sunderland. Penney arrived by air on 22 September. Everything was ready by 30 September, and the only remaining factor was the weather. This was unfavourable on 1 October but improved the following day, when Penney designated 3 October as the date for the test. The final countdown commenced at 07:45 local time on 3 October 1952. Plym was moored a few hundred metres west of T2 (approximately 20°24′16″S 115°34′00″E). The bomb was successfully detonated at 7:59:24 am on 3 October 1952 local time, which was 11:59:24 pm on 2 October 1952 UTC, 0:59:24 am on 3 October in London, and 7:59:24 am on 3 October in Perth. The explosion occurred 2.7 metres (8 ft 10 in) below the water line, and left a saucer-shaped crater on the seabed 6 metres (20 ft) deep and 300 metres (980 ft) across. The yield was estimated at 25 kilotons of TNT (100 TJ). All that was left of Plym was a "gluey black substance" that washed up on the shore of Trimouille Island. Derek Hickman, a Royal Engineer observing the blast aboard Zeebrugge, later said of Plym, "all that was left of her were a few fist-sized pieces of metal that fell like rain, and the shape of the frigate scorched on the sea bed." The bomb had performed exactly as expected.

Two Dragonfly helicopters flew in to gather a sample of contaminated seawater from the lagoon. Scientists in gas masks and protective gear visited points in pinnaces to collect samples and retrieve recordings. Tracker controlled this aspect, as it had the decontamination facilities. Air samples were collected by RAAF Avro Lincoln aircraft. Although the feared tidal surge had not occurred, radioactive contamination of the islands was widespread and severe. It was clear that had an atomic bomb exploded in a British port, it would have been a catastrophe worse than the bombing of Hiroshima and Nagasaki. The fallout cloud rose to 3,000 metres (10,000 ft) and was blown out to sea, as intended; but later reversed direction and blew over the Australian mainland. Very low levels of radioactivity were detected as far away as Brisbane.

Penney and some of his staff returned by air on 9 October. He was appointed a Knight Commander of the Order of the British Empire on 23 October 1952 for his role in Operation Hurricane. Torlesse was supposed to accompany him, but in view of the degree of radioactive contamination, he felt he could not leave his command. He sent Captain D. P. Willan, the skipper of Narvik in his stead. The Royal Navy ships departed the Montebello Islands on 31 October. Most of the scientific staff were dropped off at Fremantle, and returned to Britain on RAF Transport Command aircraft. The rest returned on Campania, which arrived in the United Kingdom on 15 December. Hawkesbury continued to patrol the area until 15 January 1953.

== Outcome ==
Two more nuclear tests were conducted in the Montebello Islands as part of Operation Mosaic in 1956, the detonations taking place on Alpha and Trimouille Islands. By the 1980s the radioactivity had decayed to the point where it was no longer hazardous to the casual visitor, but there were still radioactive metal fragments containing cobalt-60, the remains of Plym. The island remained a prohibited area until 1992. A 2006 zoological survey found that the wildlife had recovered, and that the Aprasia rostrata, the legless lizard discovered by Hill, was not extinct. As part of the Gorgon gas project, rats and feral cats were eradicated from the Montebello Islands in 2009, and birds and marsupials were transplanted from nearby Barrow Island to Hermite Island. Today, the Montebello Islands are a park. Visitors are advised not to spend more than an hour per day at the test sites, nor to take relics of the tests as souvenirs. A pyramid-shaped obelisk marks the site of the explosion on Alpha Island.

In 1992, Australian scientists Keith Wise and John Moroney of the Australian Radiation Laboratory estimated that the collective dose to the Australian population due to the test was 110 person sieverts (11,000 person rem), statistically enough to have caused one death from cancer. Of the 1,518 personnel involved who were issued with film badges, 1,263 recorded no measurable amount of radiation, and 14 recorded 5 millisieverts (0.50 rem) over the course of the whole operation. None recorded more than 50 millisieverts (5.0 rem). Dosimeters and film badges were not issued to the crews of the RAAF Lincolns who gathered radioactive samples, but later experience showed that exposure would not have been medically significant. Studies of British veterans of all nuclear tests in 1983, 1988, 1993 and 2003 did not find conclusive evidence of increased mortality or health effects. A 2006 study of nearly 11,000 Australian participants of the British nuclear testing program showed that participants had an 18% increased mortality from cancers and a 23% increase in overall cancer incidence, but the increase in cancer mortality and incidence could not be linked to the radiation exposure from nuclear testing, but rather to solar radiation.

With the success of Operation Hurricane, Britain became the third nuclear power after the United States and the Soviet Union. The first production bombs, of the Blue Danube design, based on the Hurricane device, were delivered to the RAF in November 1953 and, two years later, the RAF had bombers capable of carrying them. In the interim, the UK relied on the US Strategic Air Command (SAC) for its nuclear deterrent. SAC began deploying nuclear-capable bombers to the UK in April 1949. Four weeks after Operation Hurricane, the United States successfully demonstrated a hydrogen bomb. The technology mastered in Operation Hurricane was six years old, and with the hydrogen bomb in hand, the US Congress saw no benefit in renewing cooperation. All the while Britain strove for independence, at the same time it sought interdependence in the form of a renewal of the Special Relationship with the United States. As successful as it was, Operation Hurricane fell short on both counts.

== Summary ==
United Kingdom's Hurricane series tests and detonations
Name	Date and time	Location	Elevation + height	Delivery, purpose	Device	Yield	Fallout	Notes
Hurricane	23:59:24 2 October (UTC); 07:59:24 3 October (AWST)	Trimouille Island, Montebello Islands, Western Australia 20°24′19″S 115°33′59″E	0–2.7 metres (0.0–8.9 ft)	Barge, weapon effect	British Blue Danube design, levitated pit	25 kt	Unknown	Exploded in the hull of HMS Plym
