= HMS Plym (K271) =

River-class frigate of the Royal Navy

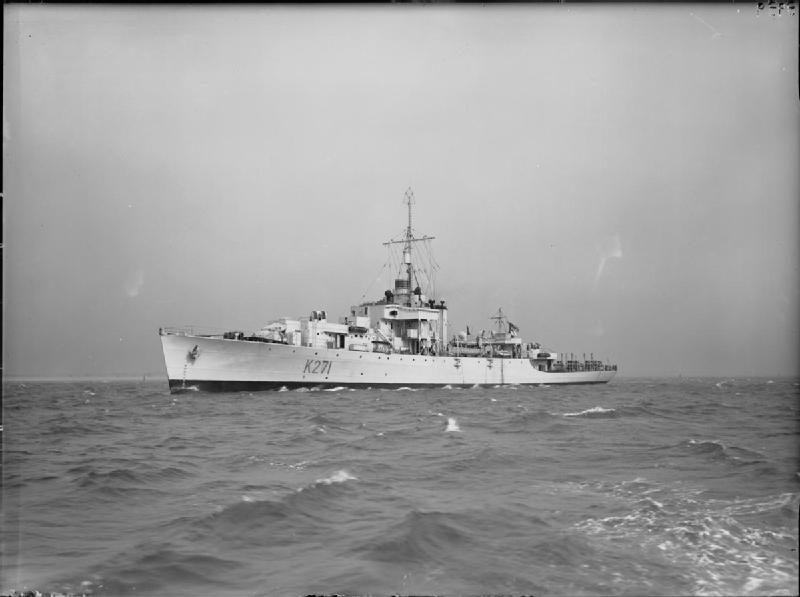
- HMS Plym under way on 12 May 1943

History

United Kingdom
- Name: Plym
- Namesake: River Plym
- Builder: Smiths Dock Co., South Bank-on-Tees
- Laid down: 1 August 1942
- Launched: 4 February 1943
- Commissioned: 16 May 1943
- Decommissioned: 1952
- Identification: Pennant number: K271
- Fate: Destroyed on 3 October 1952 in the Operation Hurricane nuclear bomb test in the Montebello Islands, Western Australia.

General characteristics
- Class & type: River-class frigate
- Displacement: 1,370 long tons (1,390 t); 1,830 long tons (1,860 t) (deep load)
- Length: 283 ft (86.26 m) p/p; 301.25 ft (91.82 m)o/a
- Beam: 36.5 ft (11.13 m)
- Draught: 9 ft (2.74 m); 13 ft (3.96 m) (deep load)
- Propulsion: 2 × Admiralty 3-drum boilers, 2 shafts, reciprocating vertical triple expansion, 5,500 ihp (4,100 kW)
- Speed: 20 knots (37 km/h; 23 mph)
- Range: 7,500 nautical miles (13,890 km) at 15 knots (27.8 km/h)
- Endurance: 646 long tons (656 t) oil fuel
- Complement: 140
- Armament: 2 × QF 4 in (102 mm)/40 Mk.XIX, single mounts CP Mk.XXIII; up to 10 × QF 20 mm Oerlikon A/A on twin mounts Mk.V and single mounts Mk.III; 1 × Hedgehog 24 spigot A/S projector; up to 150 depth charges

HMS Plym (K271) was a River-class frigate that served in the Royal Navy between 1943 and 1952. The ship was destroyed in the United Kingdom's first nuclear weapon test, Operation Hurricane in 1952.

== Construction ==
Plym was built to the Royal Navy's specifications as a Group II River-class frigate. She was laid down by Smiths Dock Co. at their yard in South Bank-on-Tees on 1 August 1942 and launched on 4 February 1943. She was commissioned into the Royal Navy on 16 May 1943 as HMS Plym (K271) and was named after the River Plym in Devon, England which flows into the English Channel at Plymouth.

== Service history ==
Plym saw extensive service on Atlantic convoy escort missions. Plym, along with HMS Bann, HMS Teviot and HMS Trent, provided anti-submarine escort to the convoy WS-33 which arrived in South Africa from the United Kingdom on 9 October 1943 with critical reinforcements for service in Burma.

=== Operation Hurricane ===
Plym was used as the detonation platform for the UK's first nuclear weapon in Operation Hurricane. A 25-kiloton atom bomb was detonated a few seconds before 09:30 local time on 3 October 1952 approximately 400 metres (440 yd) from the island of Trimouille in the Monte Bello Islands, Western Australia.

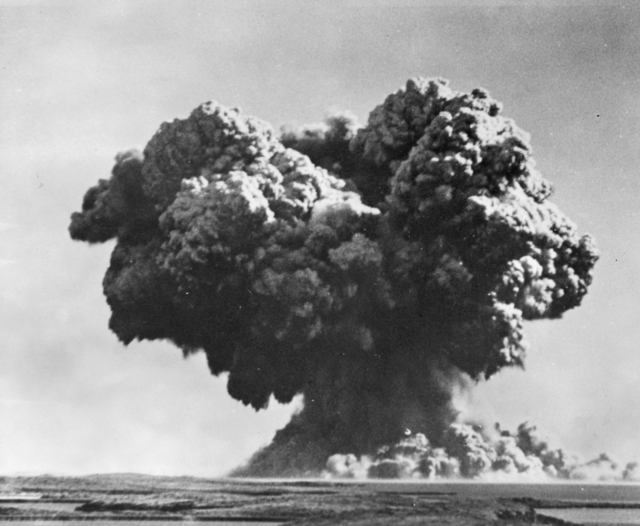
Plym exploding during Operation Hurricane on 3 October 1952

Although data acquisition would have been simplified by detonating the bomb from a tower above the ground or sea surface, it was conducted aboard Plym in order to simulate the effects of a nuclear weapon being smuggled into a British harbour aboard a ship.
