= Montebello Islands =

Island group in Western Australia

Coordinates: 20.46°S 115.54°E

Location of the Montebello Islands

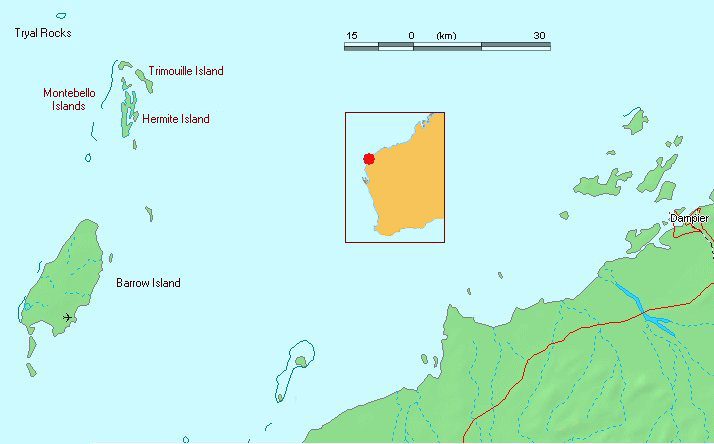
Map of the Montebellos and Barrow Island

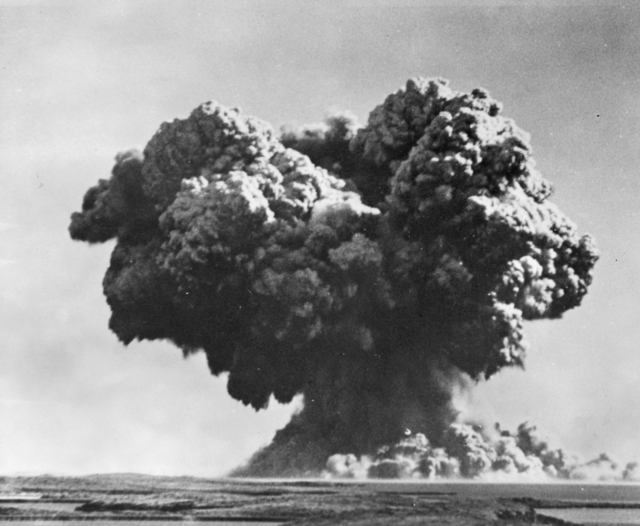
The mushroom cloud resulting from the Operation Hurricane detonation on Trimouille Island

The Montebello Islands, also rendered as the Monte Bello Islands, are an archipelago of around 174 small islands, about 92 of which are named, lying 20 km (12 mi) north of Barrow Island and 130 km (81 mi) off the Pilbara coast of north-western Australia. The islands form a marine conservation reserve of 58,331 ha (144,139 acres) administered by the Western Australian Department of Environment and Conservation. The islands were the site of three British atmospheric nuclear weapons tests, in 1952 and 1956.

== Description ==
The islands of the archipelago have a collective land area of about 22 km^{2} (8.5 sq mi). The largest islands, Hermite and Trimouille, have an area of 1,022 ha (2,525 acres) and 522 ha (1,290 acres) respectively. They consist of limestone rock and sand. The rocky parts are dominated by Triodia hummock grassland with scattered shrubs, while the sandy areas support grasses such as sedges, and shrubs, mainly Acacia. Patches of mangroves grow in sheltered bays and channels of the archipelago, especially on Hermite Island. The climate is hot and arid with an annual average rainfall of about 320 mm.

=== Wildlife ===
==== Birds ====
The islands have been identified by BirdLife International as an Important Bird Area (IBA) because they support over 1% of the world populations of fairy and roseate terns, and of sooty oystercatchers. Greater crested terns breed there irregularly, sometimes in large numbers. Other birds breeding on the islands include ospreys, white-bellied sea eagles, pied oystercatchers, Caspian terns and bridled terns. The islands support 12–15 breeding pairs of beach stone-curlews. Yellow white-eyes have been recorded.

==== Mammals ====
Invasive feral cats and black rats have been eradicated from the islands, allowing endangered rufous hare-wallabies (mala) and Shark Bay mice to be translocated to the islands under the conservation management strategy for those threatened species, and they are now common on many of the larger islands.

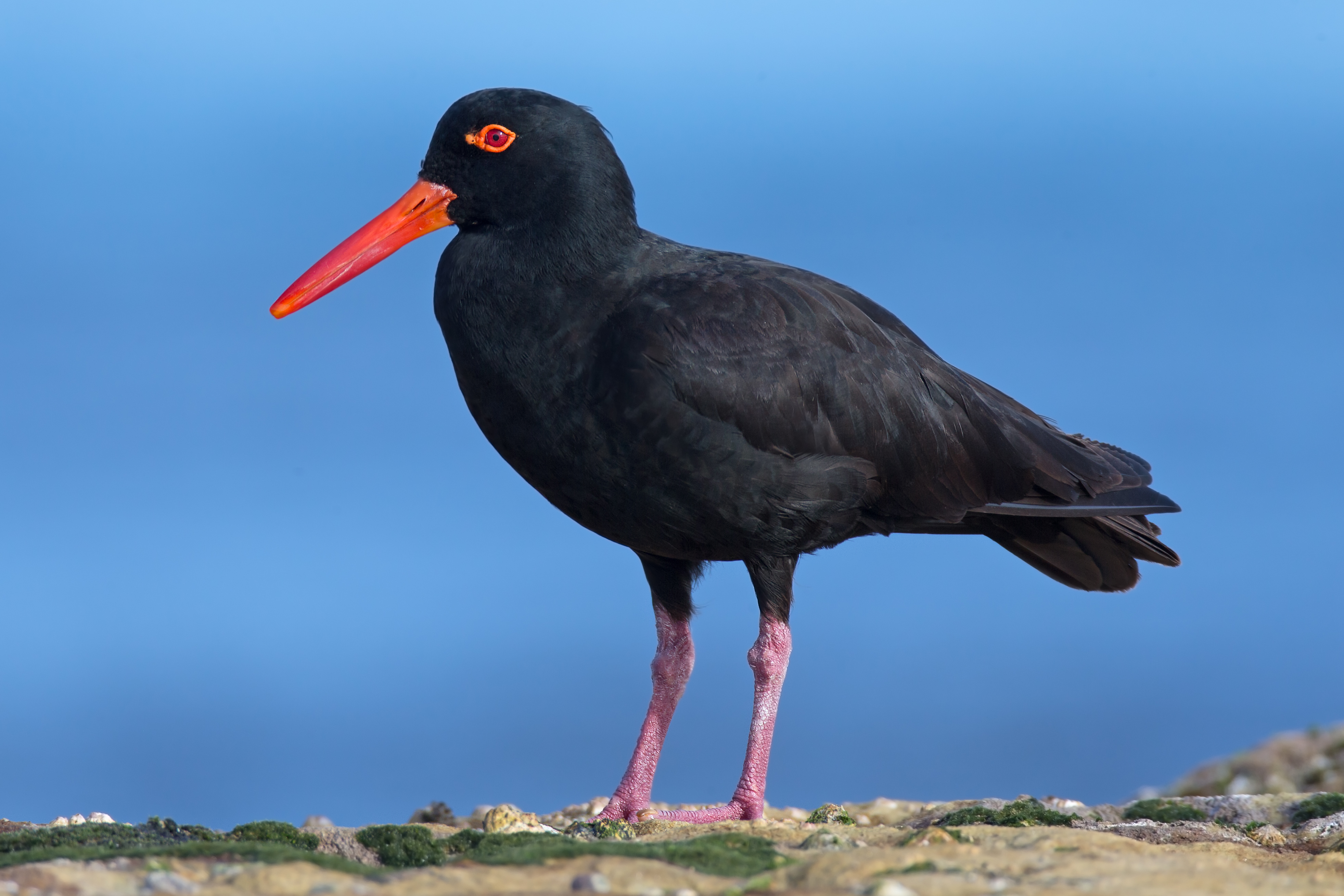
The islands are an important site for sooty oystercatchers

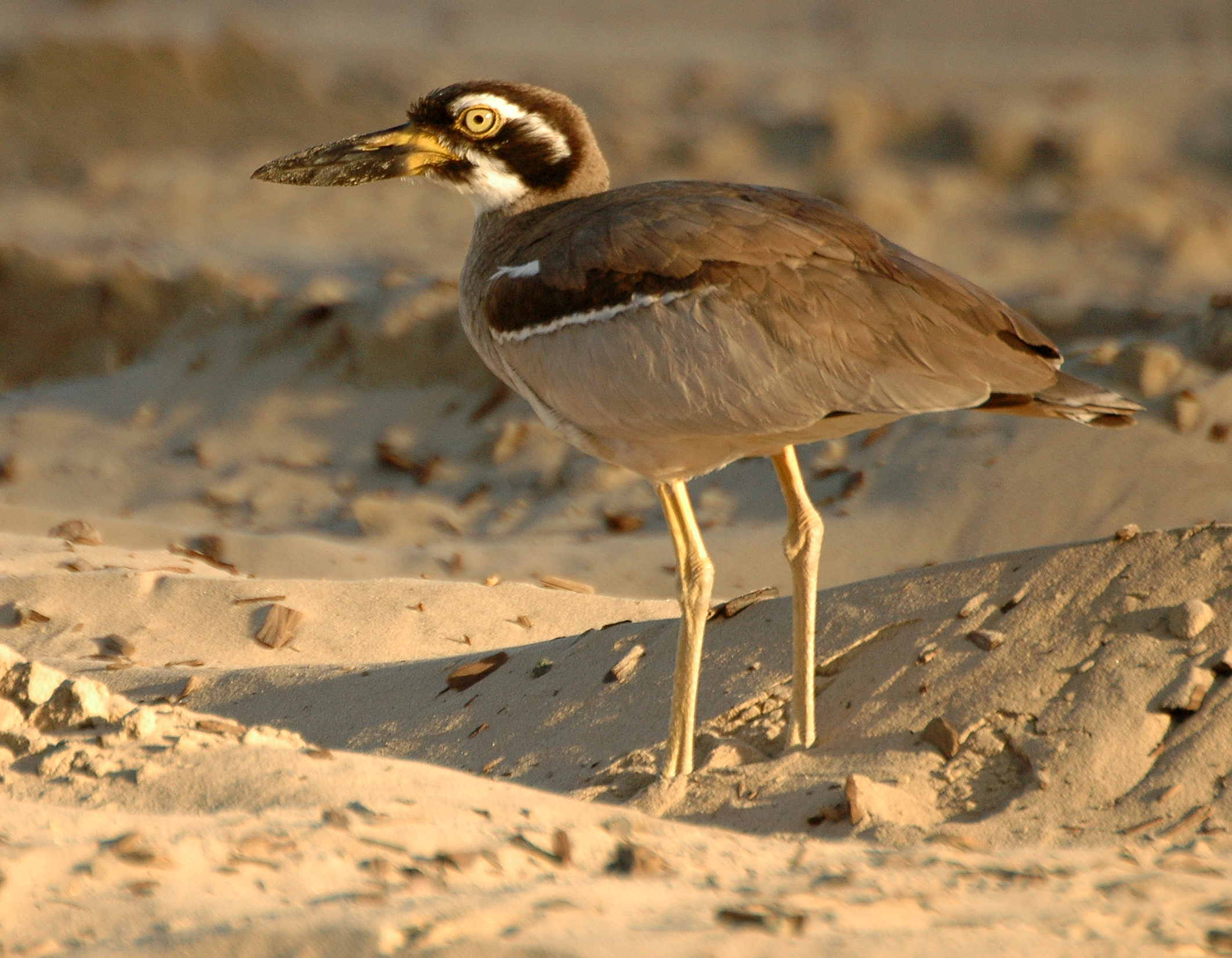
Beach stone-curlews inhabit the islands

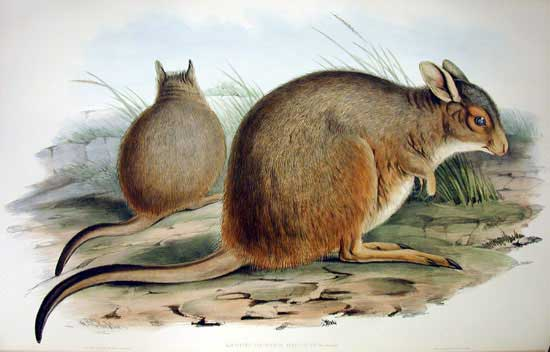
Mala have been introduced to the islands

== History ==
Archaeological remains show that the islands were visited by indigenous Australians until about 8248 BP, when a period of global warming and rising sea levels caused the Montebellos to become separated from the mainland, and forced their abandonment.

In 1622 Tryall, an English East India Company-owned East Indiaman, was wrecked on the Tryal Rocks, a reef of uncharted submerged rocks about 32 kilometres (20 mi) north-west of the outer edge of the Montebello Islands. The ship's factor, Thomas Bright, along with 35 others, sailed a longboat to the Montebello Islands and spent seven days ashore there, before sailing the longboat to Bantam in Java. It was the first recorded shipwreck in Australian waters and the first extended stay in Australia by Europeans.

In 1801, Nicolas Baudin, leading a French Navy exploration expedition, named the island group after the Battle of Montebello of 1800, Hermite Island after Admiral Jean-Marthe-Adrien L'Hermite, and Trimouille Island after French general Louis II de la Trémoille.

The islands were economically significant for pearl fishing from the end of the 19th century until the outbreak of the Second World War.

=== British nuclear weapons tests ===
The Montebello Islands were the site of three atmospheric nuclear weapon tests by the British military: one in 1952, and two in 1956.

HMS Plym, moored in Main Bay on Trimouille Island, was the site of Operation Hurricane, the first atomic weapon tested by the United Kingdom, on 3 October 1952.

While subsequent British tests were conducted at sites on mainland Australia, in 1956 there were two land-sited tower-mounted tests, on Trimouille and Alpha Islands. The second of those, codenamed "Mosaic G2", was the largest nuclear explosion in Australia, with an official yield of 60 kilotons. Mosaic G2 was later described as an "exceptionally dirty explosion", the fallout from which contaminated large areas of mainland Australia, as far away as the Queensland towns of Mount Isa, Julia Creek, Longreach and Rockhampton.

== Islands ==
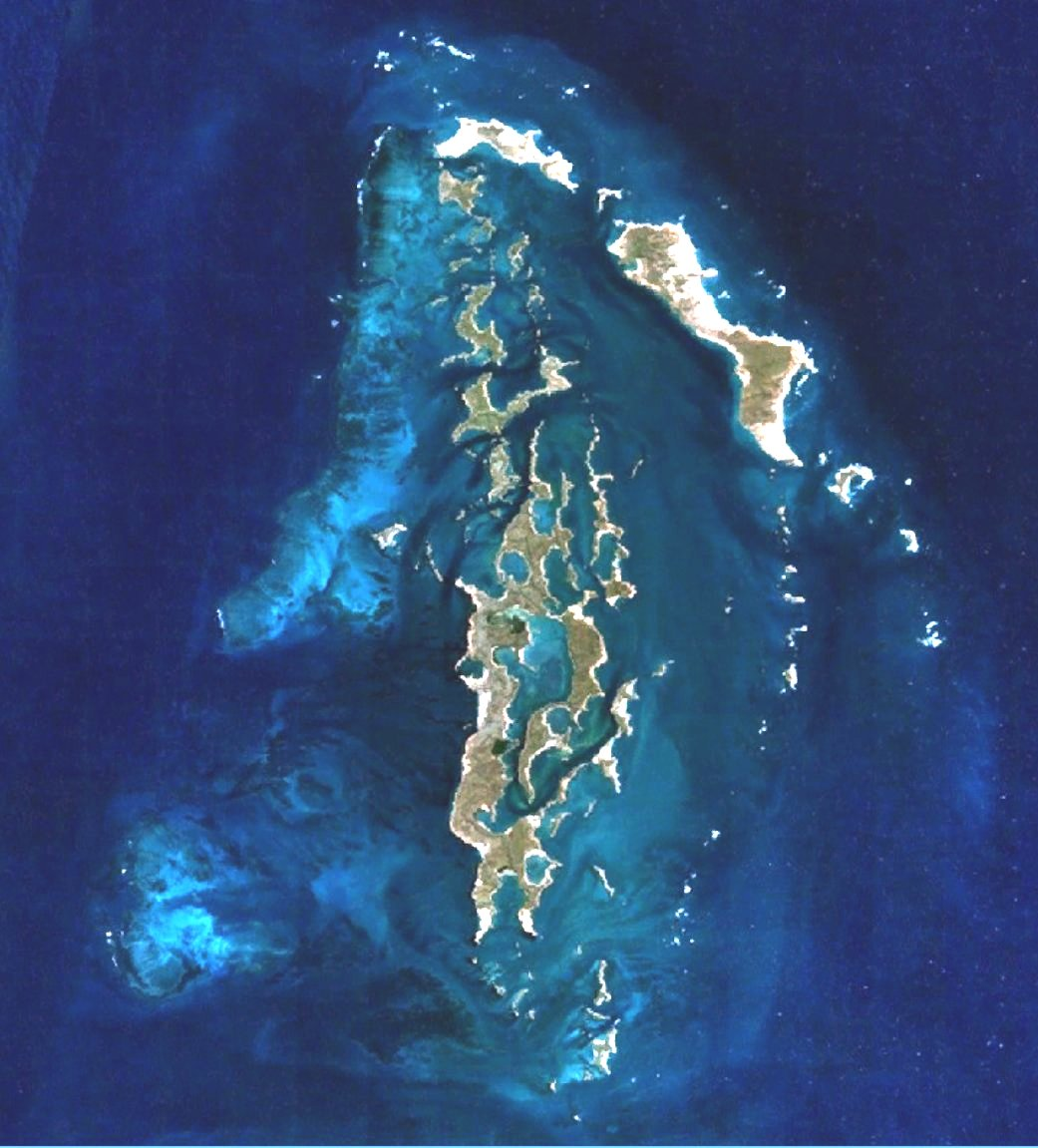
NASA World Wind satellite image of the main Montebello Island group (2006)

Of the smaller islands, the largest are:

- North-West Island
- Primrose Island
- Bluebell Island
- Alpha Island
- Crocus Island
- Campbell Island
- Delta Island
- Renewal Island
- Ah Chong Island

There are also 10 named groups of small islets, whose individual islands have not yet been named:

- Corkwood Islands
- Fig Islands
- Hakea Islands
- Jarrah Islands
- Jasmine Islands
- Karri Islands
- Marri Islands
- Minnieritchie Islands
- Mulga Islands
- Quandong Islands
