= Ieuan Maddock =

Welsh scientist and nuclear researcher

Sir Ieuan Maddock CB, OBE, FRS
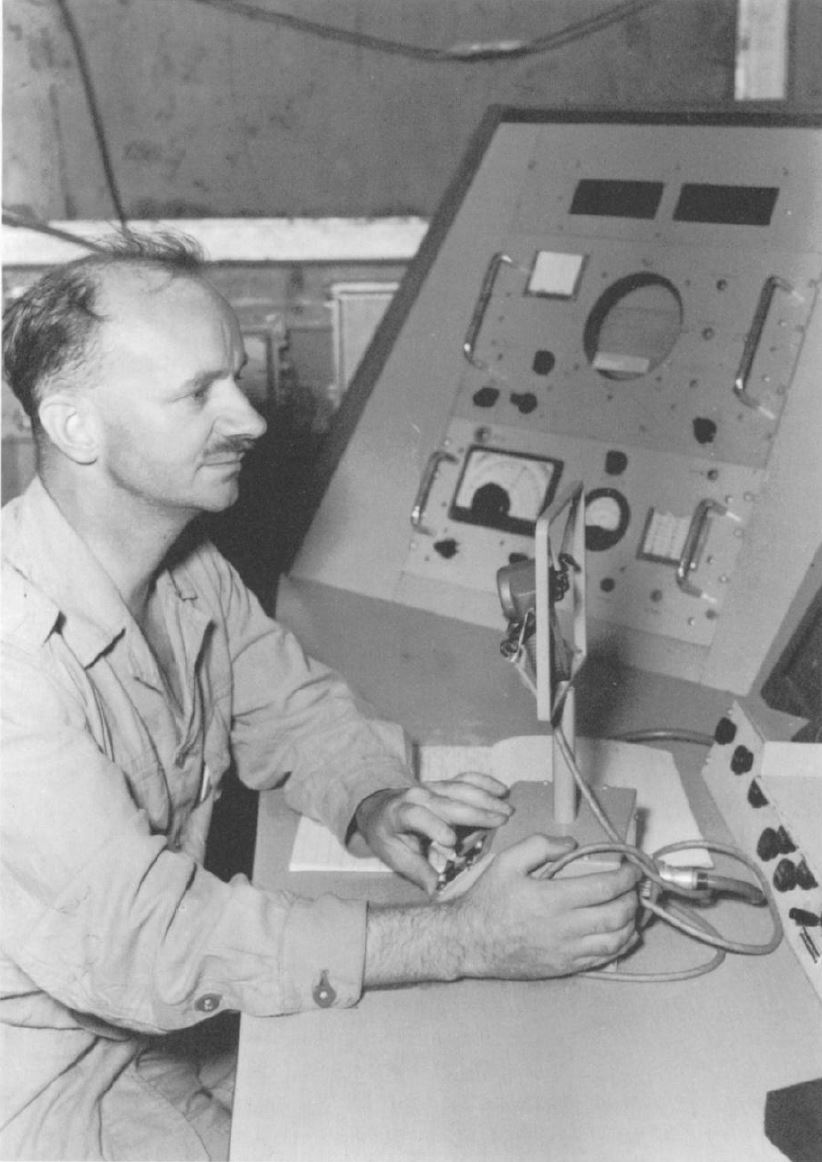
- At the control desk on Hermite Island for Operation Mosaic
- Born: Ieuan Maddock; 29 March 1917; Gorseinon, Glamorganshire, Wales
- Died: 29 December 1988 (aged 71); Caversham, Reading, Berkshire, England
- Education: University of Wales, Swansea
- Awards: Knight Bachelor (1975); Companion of the Order of the Bath (1968); Officer of the Order of the British Empire (1953); Fellow of the Royal Society (1967)
- Scientific career
- Fields: Physicist
- Workplaces: Armament Research Department, Fort Halstead; Atomic Weapons Research Establishment

Sir Ieuan Maddock (29 March 1917 – 29 December 1988) was a Welsh scientist and nuclear researcher. He played a role in the nuclear weapons tests in Australia in the 1950s and the 1973 Partial Test-Ban treaty.

== Early life ==
Ieuan Maddock was born in Gorseinon, Glamorganshire, Wales, the son of Evan Maddock, a miner, and his wife, a primary school teacher. He studied at Gowerton Grammar School before graduating from the University of Wales, Swansea in 1937 with a BSc in physics. With his First class honours, he received a postgraduate scholarship. His PhD, in which he was researching optical measurements, was postponed in 1940 when the government Department of Explosives Research and Development evacuated to Swansea during the Second World War.

Maddock worked for this department as an experimental officer until 1944 when he transferred to the Armament Research Department in Fort Halstead. Initially, he studied the creation of common explosions here, and in 1947 he specialised in appliances for nuclear explosions. Following the invention of the transistor in 1947, along with Maddock's application of electronic instruments, he obtained measurements of the speed of detonation and time of the projectiles' flight with greater accuracy.

When William Penney returned from the American Operation Crossroads nuclear tests in the Pacific to become Chief Superintendent Armament Research (CSAR), in charge of the Ministry of Supply's Armaments Research Department (ARD) at Fort Halstead in Kent, he chose Maddock to head his instrumentation team. Maddock was made an Officer of the Order of the British Empire in the 1953 New Year Honours, having been crucial to the success of firing and collecting data on the Operation Hurricane atomic bomb test in the Monte Bello Islands on 3 October 1952. He subsequently participated in the Operation Totem tests at Emu Field, Operation Mosaic tests at Monte Bello in 1956, and the Operation Buffalo British nuclear tests at Maralinga.

== Career in the Civil Service ==
Maddock was appointed Head of the Field Experiments Division of the Atomic Weapons Research Establishment in 1960, ensuring a continued role in British bomb tests of the 1950s and 1960s. In this role, Maddock directed the Research scheme in the UK for a Nuclear Test Ban Treaty. He headed research into refining instruments and developing a strategy for their utilization at the centre of seismology near Aldermaston. While the detection of nuclear explosives in the atmosphere far from a test site, and in space, was not an issue, underground explosions had the potential to be muffled or detected as an earthquake. Maddock thus enhanced instruments to amplify the signal caused by an explosion, allowing for detection of explosions thousands of kilometres away. In order to attain political control of nuclear explosions, such equipment would be required in multitudes, resulting in the 1973 Partial Test-Ban Treaty, which was signed by 150 countries.

Maddock was removed from Aldermaston in 1965 to serve as Deputy Controller B at the Ministry of Technology, being made Controller in 1967. This was a new department, created by the Labour government, with Frank Cousins, and later Tony Benn, as his minister. In this role, Maddock worked on engineering improvements and developing technical skills in design and manufacture, but was often frustrated by unreasoning resistance to change among British management and workers, and within the Civil Service itself. He was elected a Fellow of the Royal Society in 1967, and appointed a Companions of the Order of the Bath in the 1968 New Year Honours.

In 1971, Maddock was appointed Chief Scientist in the Department of Trade and Industry when it replaced the Ministry of Technology, and then became Chief Scientist in the Department of Industry from 1974 to 1977 following the department split. Maddock was also made Director of the National Physical Laboratory in 1975, before his retirement from the Civil Service in 1977.

== Later career ==
Following his departure from the Civil Service, Maddock served as an advisor on committees of Cranfield, Surrey, Brunel and Swansea colleges from 1969 to 1987. In 1979, he became Principal at St Edmund Hall, Oxford, fulfilling this role for three years. He was involved as chairman, president or member of many scientific organisations, namely the Scientific Instruments Research Association and Fulmer Research Institute Ltd., both from 1978 to 1987. He also was granted honorary doctorates from the Council for National Academic Awards and the Universities of Bath, Reading, Salford, Surrey and Wales, and was honorary Fellow of Manchester Polytechnic, Polytechnic of Wales, St Edmund Hall, Oxford, Swansea, Institute of Quality Assurance and the Institute of Electrical and Radio Engineers. He produced various publications in academic journals and was thus a visiting professor at Imperial College London from 1977 to 1979, and secretary of the British Association for the Advancement of Science from 1977 to 1981. He was knighted in the 1975 New Year Honours.

== Personal life ==
Ieuan Maddock married Eurfron May Davies, also from Gorseinon, in 1943, and they had a son named Robert. Maddock lived at 13 Darell Road, Caversham, Reading, Berkshire, from 1962 until his death on 29 December 1988, aged 71.
