= Operation Mosaic =

1956 British nuclear tests in Western Australia

Mosaic
- Second Mosaic test, called G2

Information
- Country: United Kingdom
- Test site: Montebello Islands, Western Australia
- Period: May–June 1956
- Number of tests: 2
- Test type: Tower
- Max. yield: 60 kilotonnes of TNT (250 TJ)

Test series chronology

Montebello Islands

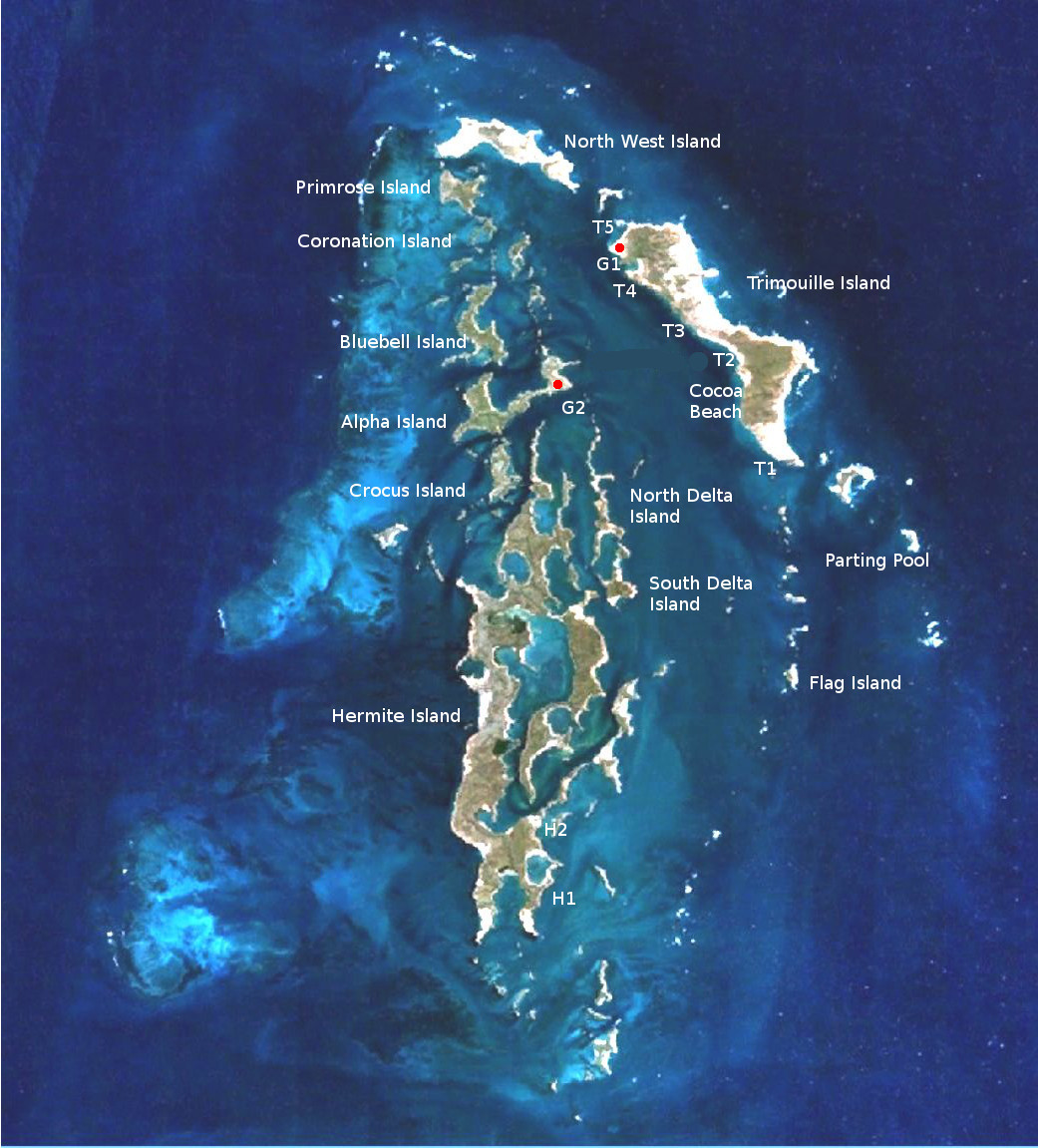
Satellite photo of the Montebello Islands, indicating the sites of the Operation Mosaic nuclear test detonations (G1 and G2)

Operation Mosaic was a series of two British nuclear tests, called G1 and G2, conducted in the Montebello Islands in Western Australia on 16 May and 19 June 1956. These tests followed the Operation Totem series and preceded the Operation Buffalo series. The second test in the series, G2, remains the largest ever conducted in Australia.

The purpose of the tests was to explore increasing the yield of British nuclear weapons through boosting with lithium-6 and deuterium, and the use of a natural uranium tamper. Although a boosted fission weapon is not a hydrogen bomb, which the British Government had agreed would not be tested in Australia, the tests were connected with the British hydrogen bomb programme. The Operation Totem tests of 1953 had been carried out at Emu Field in South Australia, but Emu Field was considered unsuitable for Operation Mosaic. A new, permanent test site was being prepared at Maralinga in South Australia, but would not be ready until September 1956. It was decided that the best option was to return to the Montebello Islands, where Operation Hurricane had been conducted in 1952.

To allow the task force flagship, the tank landing ship HMS Narvik, to return to the UK and refit in time for Operation Grapple, the planned first test of a British hydrogen bomb, the terminal date for Operation Mosaic was set as 15 July. The British Government was anxious that Grapple should take place before a proposed moratorium on nuclear testing came into effect. The second test was therefore conducted under time pressure. During the Royal Commission into British nuclear tests in Australia it was claimed that the second test was of a significantly higher yield than suggested by the official figures: 98 kilotonnes of TNT (410 TJ) as compared to 60 kilotonnes of TNT (250 TJ), but this is unsubstantiated.

== Background ==
Early in the Second World War, Britain had a nuclear weapons project, code-named Tube Alloys. The 1943 Quebec Agreement merged it with the American Manhattan Project to create a combined American, British, and Canadian undertaking. After the war, the British Government expected that the United States would continue to share nuclear technology, which Britain regarded as a joint discovery, but the United States Atomic Energy Act of 1946 (McMahon Act) ended technical cooperation. Fearing a resurgence of United States isolationism, and of Britain's losing its great power status, the British Government restarted its own development effort, which was given the cover name "High Explosive Research". The first British atomic bomb was tested in Operation Hurricane at the Montebello Islands in Western Australia on 3 October 1952.

Britain thereby became the third nuclear power, after the United States and the Soviet Union but, just four weeks after Operation Hurricane, the United States successfully tested a hydrogen bomb. The technology mastered in Operation Hurricane was six years old and, with the hydrogen bomb in hand, the US Congress saw no benefit in renewing cooperation with the UK. Although Britain strove for independence, at the same time it sought interdependence, in the form of a renewal of the nuclear Special Relationship with the United States. Therefore, on 27 July 1954, the British Government resolved to initiate a British hydrogen bomb programme. Simultaneously, momentum was gathering, both domestically and internationally, for a moratorium on nuclear testing. The British Government was anxious that this should not occur before Britain had developed a hydrogen (thermonuclear) bomb, which it expected to achieve in 1957.

== Purpose and site selection ==
In contemplating thermonuclear designs, the British scientists at the Atomic Weapons Research Establishment at Aldermaston considered boosted fission weapons. This is a type of nuclear device in which isotopes of light elements, such as lithium-6 and deuterium, are added. The resulting nuclear fusion reactions produce neutrons, increasing the rate of fission and therefore the yield. The British had no practical experience with boosting, so a test of the concept was required. The scientists had also heard a rumour from American sources that the yield could be improved by up to 50 per cent through the use of a natural uranium tamper. Two tests were therefore scheduled: one with a lead tamper to investigate the effect of lithium deuteride, and one with a natural uranium one to investigate effect of the tamper. It was hoped that the two tests would facilitate the development of a British hydrogen bomb.

The need for speed dictated the location. The Operation Totem tests of 1953 had been carried out at Emu Field in South Australia, but that location was considered unsuitable. It was too isolated, with the nearest road over 160 kilometres (100 mi) away, and only tracked vehicles, or those with special tyres, could traverse the intervening sand dunes. Emu Field therefore relied on air transport, but dust storms were a problem. Moreover, a shortage of water severely limited the number of personnel at the site. A new, permanent test site was being prepared at Maralinga in South Australia, but it would not be ready until September 1956, and the Operation Buffalo tests were already scheduled to be held there. So it was decided that the best option was to return to the Montebello Islands, where the operation could be supported by the Royal Navy. There were also doubts as to whether the Australian Government would allow a 50-kilotonne-of-TNT (210 TJ) test at Maralinga.

That was a sensitive matter, because there was an agreement with Australia that no thermonuclear testing would be carried out there. The Australian minister for supply, Howard Beale, responding to rumours reported in the newspapers, asserted that "the Federal Government has no intention of allowing any hydrogen bomb tests to take place in Australia. Nor has it any intention of allowing any experiments connected with hydrogen bomb tests to take place here." Although a boosted fusion weapon is not a hydrogen bomb, the tests were indeed connected with the development of a hydrogen bomb.

The prime minister of the United Kingdom, Sir Anthony Eden, cabled the prime minister of Australia, Robert Menzies, on 16 May 1955. Eden detailed the nature and purpose of the tests. He explained that the experiments would include the addition of light elements as a boost, but promised that the yield of neither test would exceed two and a half times that of the Operation Hurricane test. Neither the anticipated nor the actual yield of the Hurricane test had been officially disclosed to Australian officials, but the yield was 25 kilotonnes of TNT (100 TJ), so that implied an upper limit was about 60 kilotonnes of TNT (250 TJ). Later an 80-kilotonne-of-TNT (330 TJ) limit was agreed to. Eden informed Menzies that the two shots would be from towers, which would produce a fifth of the fallout of that of Operation Hurricane, and there would be no danger to people or animals on the mainland. He explained that the use of the Montebello Islands would save as much as six months of development time. Menzies wrote to Eden on 20 June and gave his approval for the tests.

== Preparations ==
Like Operation Hurricane before it, the test was a Royal Navy responsibility. Planning commenced in February 1955 under the codename Operation Giraffe. In June 1955, the Admiralty adopted the codename Operation Mosaic. The Atomic Trials Executive in London, chaired by Lieutenant General Sir Frederick Morgan, had already begun planning Operation Buffalo. It assumed responsibility for Operation Mosaic as well, sitting as the Mosaic Executive (Mosex) or Buffalo Executive (Buffalex) as appropriate. Captain Hugh Martell was in charge as commander Task Force 308, with the temporary rank of commodore. Charles Adams, from Aldermaston, who had been the deputy technical director to Leonard Tyte for Operation Hurricane, and to William Penney on Operation Totem, was appointed the scientific director for Operation Mosaic, with Ieuan Maddock as the scientific superintendent. Group Captain S. W. B. (Paddy) Menaul would command the Air Task Group. Planning was conducted at Aldermaston.

On 18 July 1955, a five-man mission, headed by Martell, that included Adams, Menaul and Lieutenant Commanders A. K. Dodds and R. R. Fotheringham, departed the UK for Australia. They arrived on 22 July, and began a series of discussions. The Australian Government created a Montebello Working Party as a subcommittee of the Maralinga Committee, a counterpart to the British Mosex. Adams met with W. A. S. Butement of the recently formed Atomic Weapons Tests Safety Committee (AWTSC), an organisation created by the Australian Government to oversee the safety of nuclear tests. Mosex agreed that at least two members of the AWTSC would be present on board the Task Force 308 flagship, the Landing Ship, Tank, HMS Narvik, when the decision to fire was taken. He also had discussions with Leonard Dwyer, the Director of the Australian Bureau of Meteorology, about the weather conditions that could be expected for the test. It was agreed that a Royal Australian Navy (RAN) frigate would act as a weather ship for the test series, and that a second weather ship might be required to give warnings of willy willies and cyclones.

A small fleet of ships was assembled for Operation Mosaic. Narvik began a refit at HM Dockyard, Chatham, in July 1955, which was completed by November. She departed the UK on 29 December 1955, and travelled via the Suez Canal, reaching Fremantle on 23 February 1956. The frigate HMS Alert, normally the yacht of the Commander-in-Chief, Far East Fleet, was loaned to act as an accommodation ship for scientists and VIPs. Along with the tanker RFA Eddyrock, they formed Task Group 308.1. The Far East Fleet also supplied the cruiser HMS Newfoundland, and destroyers HMS Cossack, Concord, Consort and Comus. These formed Task Group 308.3, which was mainly responsible for weather reporting. The destroyer HMS Diana was detailed to carry out scientific tests, and formed Task Group 308.4.

They were augmented by RAN vessels, designated Task Group 308.2. The sloop HMAS Warrego and boom defence vessel Karangi carried out a hydrographic survey of the Montebello Islands, laying marker buoys for moorings. Care had to be taken with that, because Operation Hurricane had left some parts of the islands dangerously radioactive. The corvettes HMAS Fremantle and HMAS Junee provided logistical support, ferried personnel between the islands and the mainland, and accommodated 14 Australian and British media representatives during the first test. They were replaced by Karangi for the second test. A pair of RAN 120-foot (37 m) motor lighters, MWL251 and MRL252, provided water and refrigeration respectively. The two barges were visited by the First Sea Lord, Admiral Lord Mountbatten, and Lady Mountbatten, who flew out to the islands on a Whirlwind helicopter on 15 April.

Only a small party of Royal Engineers, along with two Aldermaston scientists, travelled on Narvik. The main scientific party left London by air on 1 April. The Air Task Group consisted of 107 officers and 407 other ranks. Most were based at Pearce near Perth and Onslow in the Pilbara region, although four Royal Air Force (RAF) Shackletons and about 70 RAF personnel were based at RAAF Base Darwin, from whence the Shackletons daily flew weather reconnaissance flights, commencing on 2 March. Three Royal Australian Air Force (RAAF) Neptunes flew safety patrols, five RAF Varsity aircraft tracked clouds and flew on low-level radiological survey missions, five RAF Canberra bombers were tasked with collecting radioactive samples, four RAF Hastings aircraft flew between the UK and Australia, and two Whirlwind helicopters provided a taxi service. The United States Air Force (USAF) provided a pair of C-118 Liftmasters to collect radioactive samples. The USAF wanted to monitor the British tests with their own aircraft to practice their techniques for monitoring Soviet ones. The British readily agreed, as it would demonstrate their nuclear capabilities to the Americans. Lieutenant-Colonel R. N. B. Holmes was in charge of the Royal Engineers, whose task including erecting the 91-metre (300 ft) aluminium towers for the shots.

== G1, the first test ==
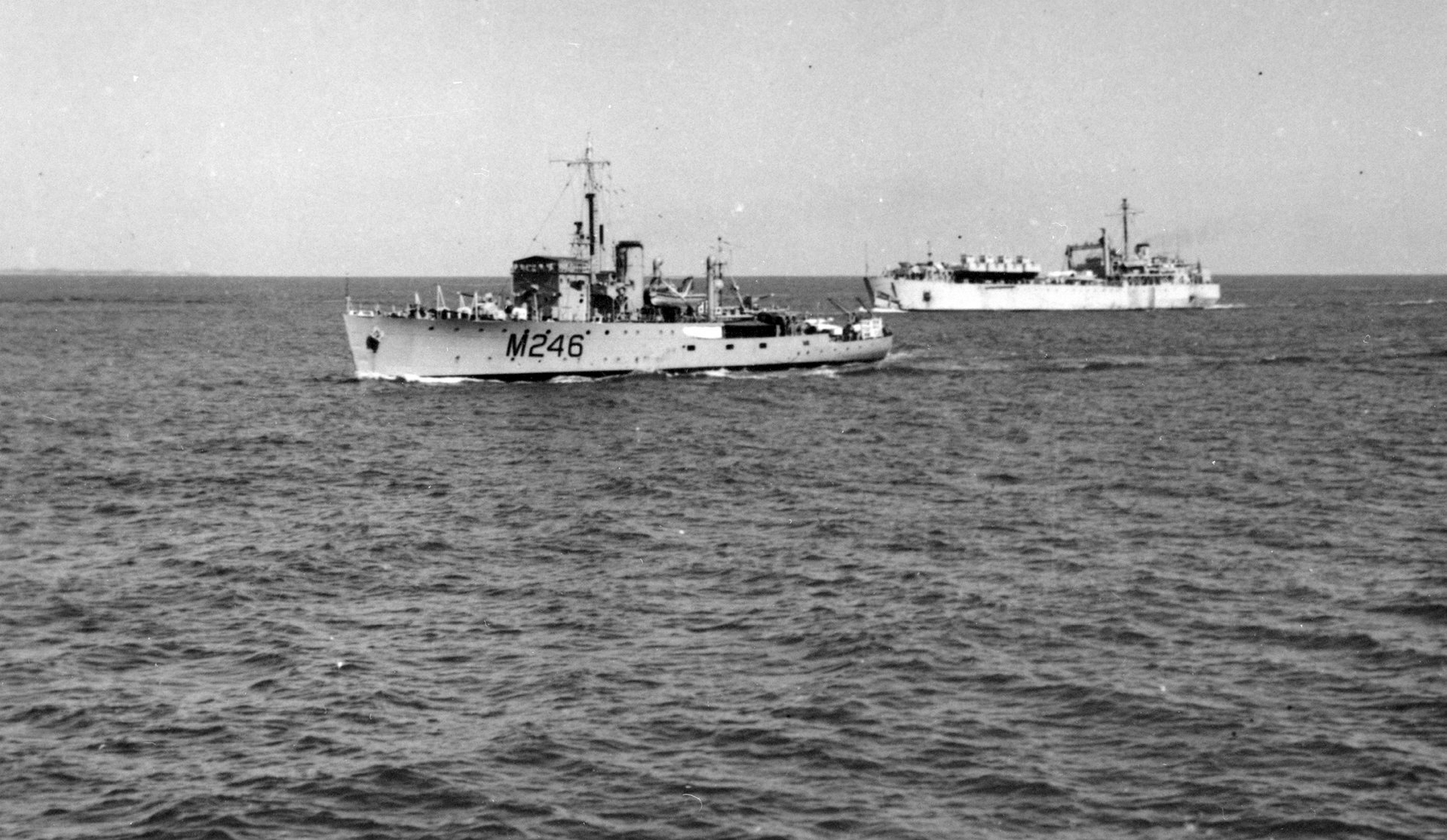
Corvette HMAS Fremantle (left) and Landing Ship, Tank, HMS Narvik (right), bound for Montebello Islands

Adams arrived at the Montebello Islands on 22 April, and was sufficiently impressed with the progress of works to schedule a scientific rehearsal (involving only the scientific party) for 27 April. A second scientific rehearsal was held on 2 May, followed by a full rehearsal (involving all personnel) on 5 May. The fissile material was delivered by an RAF Hastings to Onslow, from where it was collected by HMS Alert on 11 May, and delivered to the Montebello Islands the following day. Five members of the AWTSC, Leslie H. Martin, Ernest Titterton, Cecil Eddy, Butement and Dwyer, arrived at Onslow and were flown to Narvik by helicopter on 14 May. The following day, Martell set 16 May as the date for the test. The nuclear test series generated protests in Perth, and the deputy premier of Western Australia, John Tonkin, promised to discuss demands for an end to them. Martin and Titterton confronted Martell and Adams, and Martin told them that without sufficient information about the nature of the tests, the AWTSC could not approve them. That it had a veto came as a surprise, because that was not what their orders from London said. Penney sent a message to Adams 10 May:

Strongly advise not showing Safety Committee any significant weapon details, but would not object to their seeing outside of cabled ball in centre section. They could be told that fissile material is at centre of large ball of high explosive and that elaborate electronics necessary to get symmetrical squash. No details of explosives configuration or inner components must be revealed. Appreciate that the position is awkward for you and that you must make minor concessions.

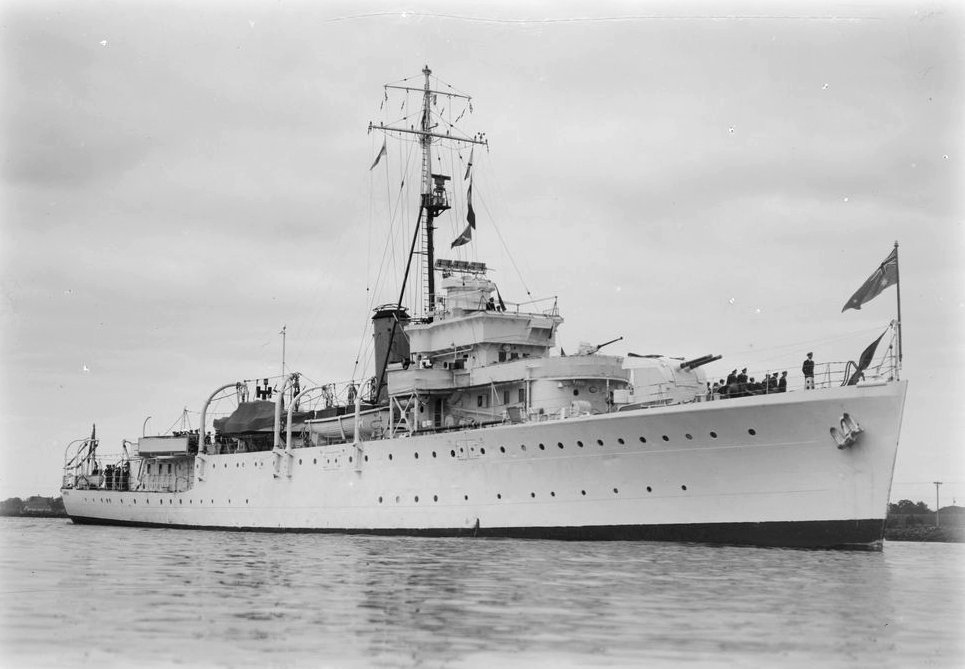
The sloop HMAS Warrego conducted a hydrographic survey of the Montebello Islands.

Rather than stonewall, Adams and Martell disclosed the same information that had been given to Menzies, on condition that they kept it to themselves. That mollified them, and the G1 test went ahead. The device was detonated on Trimouille Island at 03:50 UTC (11:50 local time) on 16 May. Soon afterwards, Narvik and Alert sailed into the Parting Pool in the Montebello Islands. The Radiological Group, wearing full protective clothing, entered the lagoon in a cutter. They retrieved measuring instruments and conducted a ground survey. A tent with a decontamination area was established ashore, and a water pump allowed the Radiological Group to wash themselves before they returned to Narvik. The main danger to the ships' crews was considered to be from radioactive seaweed, so they were prohibited from catching or eating fish, and the ships' evaporators were not run. Spot checks were made to verify that there was no contamination on board. Most of the sample collection was completed by 20 May. An extra run was made to collect film badges from Hermite Island, and Maddock paid the crater a visit on 25 May to collect further samples. Two RAF Canberra bombers flew through the cloud to collect samples, one of which was flown by Menaul.

The results of the test were mixed. The yield was between 15 and 20 kilotonnes of TNT (63 and 84 TJ), as had been anticipated, although the mushroom cloud rose to 6,400 metres (21,000 ft) instead of 4,300 metres (14,000 ft) as predicted. Valuable data was obtained. The implosion system had performed flawlessly, but the boosting effect of the small quantity of lithium deuteride had been negligible. HMS Diana, about 9.7 kilometres (6 mi) from ground zero, was quickly decontaminated, and sailed for Singapore on 18 May. The fallout cloud initially moved out to sea as predicted, but then reversed direction and drifted across northern Australia. Tests on the aircraft at Onslow had detected signs of radioactive contamination from G1, indicating that some fallout had been blown over the mainland.

== G2, the second test ==
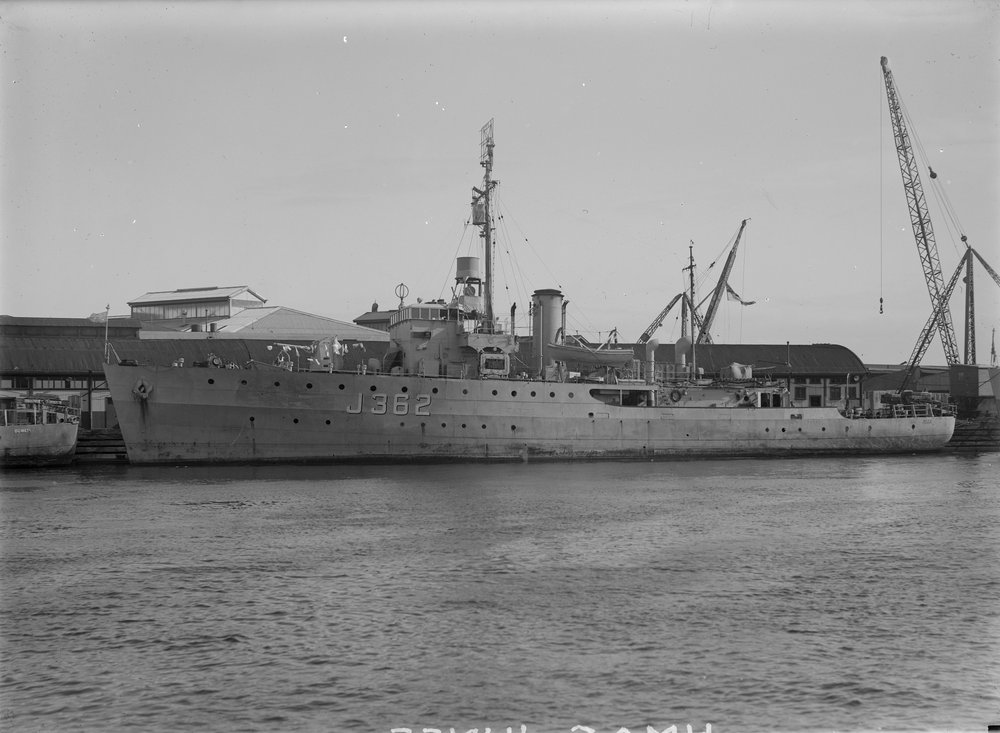
The corvette HMAS Junee provided logistical support.

The results of G1 meant that a natural uranium tamper could be used in G2 without exceeding the planned 80 kilotonnes of TNT (330 TJ) limit agreed to with the AWTSC. For safety purposes, such as how far away people could be, 100 kilotonnes of TNT (420 TJ) was used as the benchmark to provide an additional margin. Scientific rehearsals for G2 were held on 28 and 31 May, followed by a full rehearsal on 4 June. The fissile core of the device was delivered to Onslow by RAF Hastings on 6 June and, once again, was couriered to the Montebello Islands by HMS Alert. Then followed a period of waiting for suitable weather conditions. The idea was to avoid, as far as possible, fallout being blown over the mainland. At that time of year, winds at low altitudes were mainly subject to coastal influences but, above 3,000 metres (10,000 ft), the prevailing winds were from the west. What was required was an interval during which the prevailing wind pattern was interrupted.

That was not common at this time of the year. At the start of Operation Mosaic, it had been estimated that conditions favourable for G2 would occur on only three days per month. Owing to the need for days of preparation, the tests could only proceed on days when meteorologists forecast good weather and the weather was actually good. Since Narvik's arrival in March, not one day had met both conditions, because although several days were good, they had not been forecast to be. To allow Narvik to return to the UK and refit for Operation Grapple, the first test of a British hydrogen bomb, 15 July was set as the terminal date for Mosaic. As the deadline approached, William Cook — the scientist in charge of the hydrogen bomb project at Aldermaston — determined that, in view of the results of G1, G2 was now more important than ever. He agreed that Grapple could, if necessary, be delayed to conduct G2. With time running short, the test procedures were altered to allow for a break in the weather to be exploited, with an earlier firing time and a shorter countdown.

Another complication was safety. While the test of a larger device would normally mandate a larger safety area, Beale had announced that the G2 test was going to be smaller than G1. To avoid embarrassing him, the safety area was not enlarged, and no official announcement was made to the contrary. The weather improved on 8 June, and Martell ordered the countdown to begin the following day, but Beale objected to a test being carried out on a Sunday. During Operation Totem there was an agreement that no tests would be conducted on Sundays. Mosex considered that matter in London, and directed Martell not to test on 10 June. The following 48 hours were unsuitable. On 17 June, the meteorologists predicted a break in the weather and Martell ordered the countdown to recommence. Weather balloons indicated that conditions were stable between 1,500 and 7,500 metres (5,000 and 24,500 ft), with an anomaly between 5,800 and 7,500 metres (19,000 and 24,500 ft) that was not considered significant.

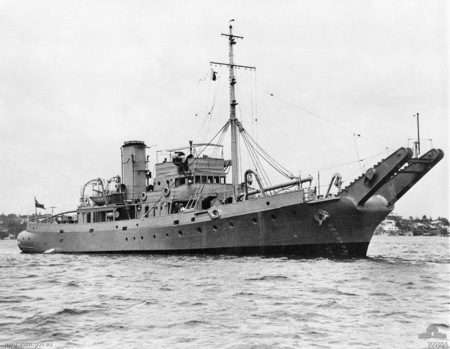
The boom defence vessel Karangi carried out a hydrographic survey of the Montebello Islands

G2 was detonated from a tower on Alpha Island at 02:14 UTC (10:14 local time) on 19 June. It produced a yield of 60 kilotonnes of TNT (250 TJ), making it the largest nuclear device ever detonated in Australia. During the Royal Commission into British nuclear tests in Australia in 1985, Joan Smith, a British investigative journalist, published a book, Clouds of Deceit: Deadly Legacy of Britain's Bomb Tests, in which she alleged that the G2 test had a significantly higher yield than suggested by available figures—98 kilotonnes of TNT (410 TJ) as compared to the official figure of 60 kilotonnes of TNT (250 TJ). She based that claim on "secret documents released to the Public Record Office in 1985", but the text was uncited and the documents have never been found. Lorna Arnold, the official historian at the United Kingdom Atomic Energy Authority, reported that she had never seen any such documents.

The cloud rose to 14,000 metres (47,000 ft), considerably higher than the predicted 11,000 metres (37,000 ft). The procedure for collecting samples was far more limited than that of G1. A Land Rover was put ashore from a Landing Craft Assault (LCA) and driven by a party wearing protective clothing to within 120 metres (400 ft) of ground zero to collect samples and recover the blast measurement equipment. Another sortie was made to collect film badges from Hermite Island, and Maddock collected a sample from the G2 crater. The Canberra sent to fly through the cloud had trouble finding it and, only after some searching, located it about 130 kilometres (80 mi) from where it was supposed to be. The following day, the Canberra sent to track the cloud and collect more samples could not locate it at all. The bulk of the fallout drifted over the Arafura Sea but, owing to different winds at different altitudes, part of it again drifted over the mainland.

Beale had announced that the G2 test was going to be smaller than G1, so when fallout was detected over northern Australia by monitoring stations, newspapers reported something must have gone horribly wrong. The acting prime minister, Sir Arthur Fadden, ordered an inquiry. Seamen in Fremantle demanded that SS Koolinda, a cattle transport on which 75 cattle had died, be inspected, because it was feared that they had died from radioactive poisoning. The seamen refused to unload the remaining 479 cattle. A physicist from the Commonwealth X-Ray and Radium Laboratory (CXRL), using a Geiger counter, found no evidence of radioactive contamination, and the deaths were determined to have resulted from red water disease caused by a malaria-like parasite. It was estimated that someone living in Port Hedland, where the contamination was highest, would have received a dose of 580 microsieverts (0.058 rem) over a period of 50 years, assuming that they wore no clothes. An annual exposure of 150 millisieverts (15 rem) is normally considered acceptable for occupational purposes.

== Aftermath ==
By the 1980s, the radioactivity in the Montebello area had decayed to the point where it was no longer hazardous to the casual visitor, but there were still radioactive metal fragments. The island remained a prohibited area until July 1992. Feral cats were eradicated from the Montebello Islands in 1999, and rats were eradicated in 2003. The feral cats had been introduced to the islands in the 19th century, possibly from a shipwreck or pearling lugger; the black rats are believed to have come to the islands from a shipwreck in 1900. A 2006 zoological survey found that the wildlife had recovered. As part of the Gorgon gas project, birds and marsupials were translocated from nearby Barrow Island to Hermite Island. Today, the Montebello Islands are a park. Visitors are advised not to spend more than one hour per day at the test sites, or to take relics of the tests as souvenirs. An obelisk marks the site of the G2 explosion on Alpha Island.

== Summary ==
United Kingdom's Mosaic series tests and detonations
Name	Date time (UTC)	Local time zone	Location	Elevation + height	Delivery	Yield	References	Notes
G1	16 May 1956 03:50	AWST (+8 hrs)	Trimouille Island, Montebello Islands, Western Australia 20.38°S 115.55°E	4 m (13 ft) + 31 m (102 ft)	tower, weapons development	15 kt		Boosted fission weapon design with lithium deuteride
G2	19 June 1956 02:14	AWST (+8 hrs)	Alpha Island, Montebello Islands, Western Australia 20.41°S 115.54°E	8 m (26 ft) + 31 m (102 ft)	tower, weapons development	60 kt		Boosted fission with lithium deuteride and natural uranium tamper
