= Leonard Cuthbert Lucas =

Soldier, architect and public servant

- Born: 6 November 1894; Townsville, Queensland
- Died: 3 September 1978 (aged 83); St Leonards, New South Wales
- Military career
- Allegiance: Australia
- Branch: Australian Army
- Service years: 1912–1945
- Rank: Brigadier
- Service number: DX200
- Commands: Royal Australian Engineers, 6th Division; Royal Australian Engineers Training Centre
- Conflicts: First World War; Gallipoli campaign; Western Front; Second World War; Western Desert Campaign; Greek campaign; New Guinea campaign
- Awards: Distinguished Service Order; Officer of the Order of the British Empire; Military Cross; Colonial Auxiliary Forces Officers' Decoration; Mentioned in Despatches

Brigadier Leonard Cuthbert Lucas, DSO, OBE, MC, VD (6 November 1894 – 3 September 1978), was an Australian architect, public servant, and army officer. During the First World War, he served at Gallipoli and on the Western Front. During the Second World War, he served with the 6th Division in Libya, Greece and Ceylon and was Deputy Engineer-in-Chief at Advanced Land Headquarters, South West Pacific Area. After the war, he was in charge of the construction effort supporting the Operation Totem British nuclear weapons tests in Australia in 1953.

== Early life ==
Leonard Cuthbert Lucas was born in Townsville, Queensland, on 6 November 1894, the son of Robert Lucas, a sawmill manager, and his wife, Thomasina née Cuthbert. He attended a state school in Charters Towers, where he served in the Senior Cadets. He then worked as a sugar cane cutter and then a journalist, and studied engineering at the local school of mines. He joined the 2nd Infantry (Kennedy Regiment) on 1 July 1912, and was promoted to corporal and then sergeant the following year. On 24 September 1913, he was commissioned as a second lieutenant.

== First World War ==
On the outbreak of the First World War in August 1914, the Kennedy Regiment was dispatched to Thursday Island. He returned to the mainland, where he enlisted in the Australian Imperial Force (AIF) as a signaller in Sydney on 9 March 1915 and joined the 18th Battalion on 21 June 1915. He was promoted to sergeant on 25 June, the day on which the 18th Battalion embarked for Egypt on the troop ship SS Ceramic. He served at Gallipoli, where he was wounded by a gun shot in the arm, and evacuated to hospital on Mudros. He returned to his unit on 28 September, but was hospitalised with jaundice on 13 October and evacuated, this time to Malta.

Instead of returning directly to the 18th Battalion, Lucas was sent to Egypt, where he disembarked on 6 December 1915. He rejoined the 18th Battalion on 15 January 1916 after it had returned from Gallipoli. He was promoted to second lieutenant on 24 February 1916. As part of the 2nd Division, the 18th Battalion embarked at Alexandria on 18 March 1916, bound for Marseille and the Western Front, where he was promoted to the temporary rank of lieutenant on 16 June 1916. On 13 February 1917, this became substantive, and he was transferred to the 2nd Division Signal Company. He was mentioned in despatches on 1 June 1917, and awarded the Military Cross on 18 July 1917. His citation read:

For conspicuous gallantry and devotion. When all forward lines, including buried cable, had gone, he went forward to test, and with great skill and courage laid new lines under continual heavy shelling.

Lucas was wounded in the legs and feet by shell fragments on 5 November 1917, and was evacuated to England, where he was treated at the 3rd London General Hospital in Wandsworth. He returned to duty with the 2nd Division Signal on 11 April 1918. He was promoted to captain on 14 June 1918. On 28 March 1919, he married his cousin, Whilhemina Shields, a 19-year-old typist, at St John's parish church in Glasgow, Scotland. On 16 April 1919, he took non-military employment leave to work at Bridgman & Bridgman, a firm of architects and surveyors in Torquay, England, where he was able to pursue his technical qualifications. This ended on 21 July 1919, and the following day he boarded the SS Wahehe to return to Australia, arriving on 30 October 1919. His AIF appointment was terminated on 13 March 1920.

== Between the wars ==
Lucas took a job as an assistant at H. J. Brownlee, a Sydney architectural firm. In 1922, he joined the War Service Homes Commission as a draughtsman. He was officially registered as an architect on 26 June 1923. He also returned to the Militia. He had been promoted to lieutenant in the 2nd Battalion, 31st Infantry Regiment on 1 October 1918. In Sydney he joined the 2nd Battalion, 1st Infantry Regiment as a signals officer. He was posted to the 8th Double Field Company on 31 March 1921 and promoted to captain in the Australian Engineers on 1 July 1924. He served with the 1st Division Engineers from 22 November 1926 to 30 June 1927, and was promoted to major on 13 March 1930. He became a lieutenant colonel on 1 June 1933 and commanded the 1st Division Engineers until 1 August 1939, when he was placed on the unattached list.

== Second World War ==
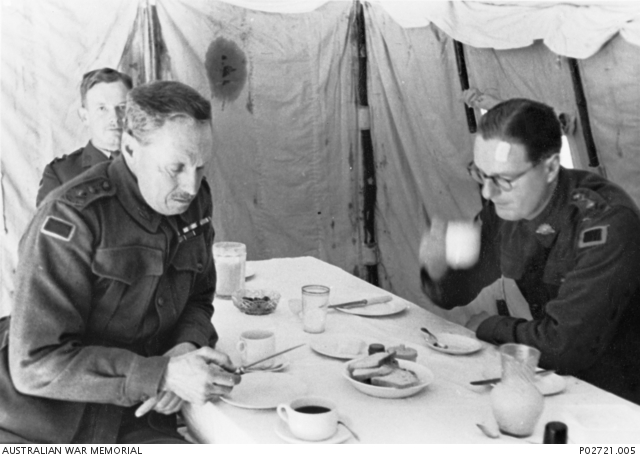
Lieutenant Colonel L C Lucas having tea with Gunner Read opposite. Captain Colin Dossetor is in the background. Dossetor died on 23 August 1943 making an experimental parachute jump; he landed in the Cataract Dam, and drowned.

On 15 August 1939, Lucas was appointed Deputy Assistant Quartermaster General of the 7th Military District, the military district encompassing the Northern Territory. On 4 September 1939, the day after Australia declared war on Germany, he was called back to full-time duty. He joined the Second AIF as a lieutenant colonel, with the AIF service number DX200, on 2 April 1940, and assumed command of the 6th Division Engineers. He embarked for the Middle East on 15 April 1940. He participated in the campaigns in Libya and Greece, and was awarded the Distinguished Service Order for the former. His citation read:

Commanded Engineers, 6 Aust Div throughout the Cyrenaica Campaign from the opening engagement at Bardia to the final defeat of the enemy on February 7th. Under his direction the engineers have done most valuable work of every conceivable kind, from breaching enemy wire, removing roads, railways, power and water installations. The work of the engineers under Lt Col Lucas contributed very materially to the success of the attacks and the rapidity of the pursuit.

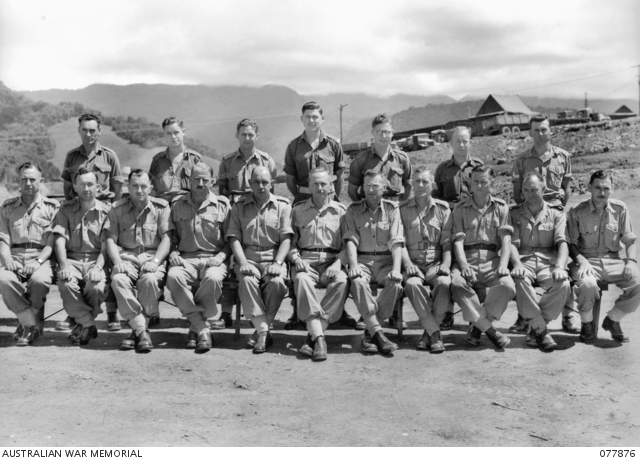
Group portrait of personnel from Advance Land Headquarters at Hollandia on 18 December 1944. Lucas is in the front row, sixth from the left.

On 12 March 1942, the 6th Division embarked for the Far East, but was diverted to defend Ceylon. On 6 April 1942, he relinquished command of the 6th Division Engineers and became the Chief Engineer of the garrison of Ceylon with the temporary rank of brigadier. He finally embarked for Australia on 24 April, reaching Adelaide on 27 May. He was posted to the G staff at Second Army Headquarters.

On 5 June, he became Deputy Engineer-in-Chief at Advanced Land Headquarters (LHQ), South West Pacific Area, with the substantive rank of colonel from 1 September, although he retained the temporary rank of brigadier. On 18 May 1945, he became Chief Engineer of Second Army and commander of the Royal Australian Engineers Training Centre at Kapooka. He was the co-author of a booklet, The Royal Australian Engineers—Lessons from The War 1939–45.

After the war ended, he relinquished these appointments on 8 November 1945, and was placed on the supernumerary list. On 18 December he was transferred to the Reserve of Officers with the rank of colonel, retaining brigadier as an honorary rank. He served as an aide-de-camp to the Governor General of Australia from 17 January 1946 to 9 January 1947.

== Later life ==
Returning to civilian life, Lucas became the Commonwealth Director of Works in the Northern Territory. He was a member of the Northern Territory Legislative Council in 1948. In 1950 he was transferred to Western Australia. In 1953 he was placed in charge of construction of facilities for the British Operation Totem nuclear tests at Emu Field in South Australia. For this work, he was made an Officer of the Order of the British Empire on 1 January 1954. He retired in 1957.

Lucas died in St Leonards, New South Wales, on 3 September 1978, and his remains were cremated. He was survived by his daughter and one of his two sons.

== List of honours ==
Distinguished Service Order
Officer of the Order of the British Empire
Military Cross
1914–15 Star
British War Medal
Victory Medal with Mention in Despatches
1939–1945 Star
Africa Star
Pacific Star
Defence Medal
War Medal 1939–1945
Australia Service Medal 1939–1945
King George V Silver Jubilee Medal
Colonial Auxiliary Forces Officers' Decoration
