= William Penney, Baron Penney =

English mathematician and physicist (1909–1991)

The Right Honourable The Lord Penney OM KBE FRS FRSE
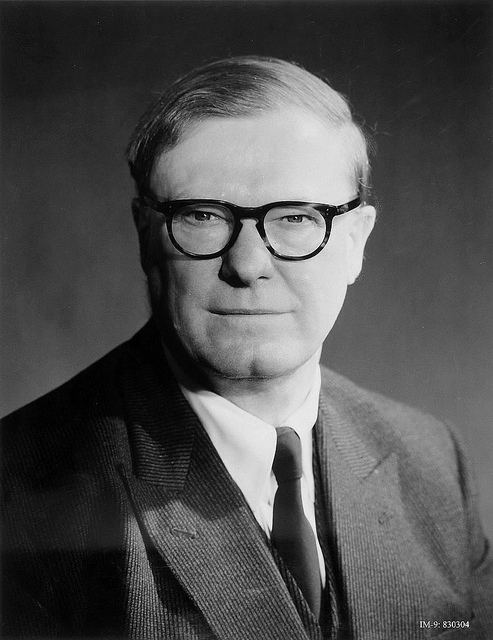
- Born: William George Penney; 24 June 1909; Gibraltar
- Died: 3 March 1991 (aged 81); East Hendred, Oxfordshire, England
- Education: Imperial College London; University of Cambridge; University of Wisconsin–Madison; University of London
- Known for: Britain's nuclear programme; damage effects of nuclear weapons; Tube Alloys; Kronig-Penney model
- Awards: Officer of the Order of the British Empire (1946); Knight Commander of the Order of the British Empire (1952); Life peer (1967); Order of Merit (1969); Wilhelm Exner Medal (1967); Rumford Medal (1969); Medal of Freedom (1946) (US)
- Scientific career
- Fields: Mathematics
- Workplaces: Atomic Weapons Research Establishment; UK Atomic Energy Authority; Los Alamos Laboratory; Imperial College London; University of Oxford; University of Cambridge

William George Penney, Baron Penney, OM, KBE, FRS, FRSE (24 June 1909 – 3 March 1991) was an English mathematician and professor of mathematical physics at the Imperial College London and later the rector of Imperial College London. He had a leading role in the development of High Explosive Research, Britain's clandestine nuclear programme that started in 1942 during the Second World War which produced the first British atomic bomb in 1952.

As the head of the British delegation working on the Manhattan Project at Los Alamos Laboratory, Penney initially carried out calculations to predict the damage effects generated by the blast wave of an atomic bomb. Upon returning home, Penney directed the British nuclear weapons directorate, codenamed Tube Alloys and directed scientific research at the Atomic Weapons Research Establishment which resulted in the first detonation of a British nuclear bomb in Operation Hurricane in 1952. After the test, Penney became chief advisor to the new United Kingdom Atomic Energy Authority (UKAEA). He was later chairman of the authority, which he used in international negotiations to control nuclear testing with the Partial Nuclear Test Ban Treaty.

Penney's notable scientific contributions included the mathematics for complex wave dynamics, both in shock and gravity waves, proposing optimisation problems and solutions in hydrodynamics (which plays a major role in materials science and metallurgy.) During his later years, Penney lectured in mathematics and physics; he was the Rector of Imperial College London 1967–1973.

== Early life and education ==
William George Penney was born in Gibraltar on 24 June 1909, the oldest child and only son of William Alfred Penney, a sergeant-major in the British Army's Ordnance Corps who was then serving overseas, and Blanche Evelyn Johnson, who had worked as a cashier before her marriage. His parents moved about frequently, but Penney did not always accompany them. After the outbreak of the First World War, Penney, his mother and his sisters moved to Sheerness, Kent, where he went to primary school. He then attended a school near Colchester, and finally, was at Sheerness Technical School for Boys from 1924 to 1926, where he displayed a talent for science. He participated in boxing and athletics, winning the school's 100-yard (91 m) dash. He also played cricket, and he was centre-forward on the school football team.

In 1927, Penney's passion for science landed him in a local science laboratory where he worked for 10 shillings a week (equivalent to £27 in 2025) as a laboratory assistant. This helped him to gain a Kent county scholarship and a royal scholarship to the Royal College of Science (RCS), a constituent college of Imperial College London. He played centre-forward on the RCS soccer team. He was permitted to skip the first year of the course, and graduated in 1929, obtaining his Bachelor of Science degree in mathematics with First Class Honours at age 20. His talent was recognised by the Governor's Prize for Mathematics from the faculty of science.

Penney was offered a research position at the London University, where he studied for a doctorate. He spent a term at the University of Groningen in the Netherlands, where he worked with Ralph Kronig. Together, they developed the Kronig–Penney model, which described the motions of electrons in periodic fields. Penney was awarded his Doctor of Philosophy (PhD) in Mathematics in 1931. He accepted a Commonwealth Fund Fellowship and travelled to the United States, where he became foreign research associate at the University of Wisconsin–Madison, studying under John H. Van Vleck, and was awarded a Master of Arts degree. While in the United States he visited Carl Anderson's laboratory at the California Institute of Technology and Ernest Lawrence's Radiation Laboratory at the University of California. He was a guest at Robert Oppenheimer's ranch in New Mexico, saw Babe Ruth play baseball, and was a spectator at the 1932 Los Angeles Olympics.

On returning to England in 1933, Penney was granted the 1851 Exhibition Scholarship to attend Trinity College, Cambridge. He changed his mathematical career to physics, and conducted a thorough research and theoretical investigation into the structure of metals and the magnetic properties of crystals with John Lennard-Jones. In 1935, Penney submitted his final thesis, which contained the fundamental work in the applications of quantum mechanics to the physics of crystals. The University of Cambridge awarded him a PhD in 1935 and a Doctor of Science in Mathematical Physics in 1936. In 1936, he was elected to the Stokes studentship at Pembroke College, Cambridge, but in the same year he returned to London and was appointed Reader in Mathematics at Imperial College London, a post he held from 1936 to 1945. On 27 July 1935, Penney married Adele Minnie Elms, a university student from Kent he had known since his days in Sheerness. They had two sons, Martin, who was born in 1938, and Christopher, who was born in 1941.

== Second World War ==
=== Physex ===
Penney registered himself as available for scientific war work, but heard nothing for several months after the outbreak of the Second World War in September 1939. He was then approached by Geoffrey Taylor. Taylor was an expert on fluid dynamics, and was dealing with more questions from government departments regarding the effects of explosions than he had time to answer. He asked Penney if he could investigate the behaviour of an underwater explosion. Penney became a member of the Physics of Explosives Committee (Physex), and reported his results to another committee, Undex, which was run by the Admiralty and was interested in underwater explosions such as those created by mines, torpedoes and depth charges, and their effects on the hulls of ships and submarines. Most of the data on underwater explosions was from the First World War.

With Royal Navy engineer officers Penney designed and supervised development of Bombardon breakwaters, steel structures that formed part of the Mulberry harbours that were placed off the Normandy beaches after the D-Day invasion. These mobile breakwaters protected landing craft and troops from the Atlantic rollers. Penney's job was to calculate the effects of waves on the Bombardons and devise the most efficient arrangement of them.

=== Manhattan Project ===
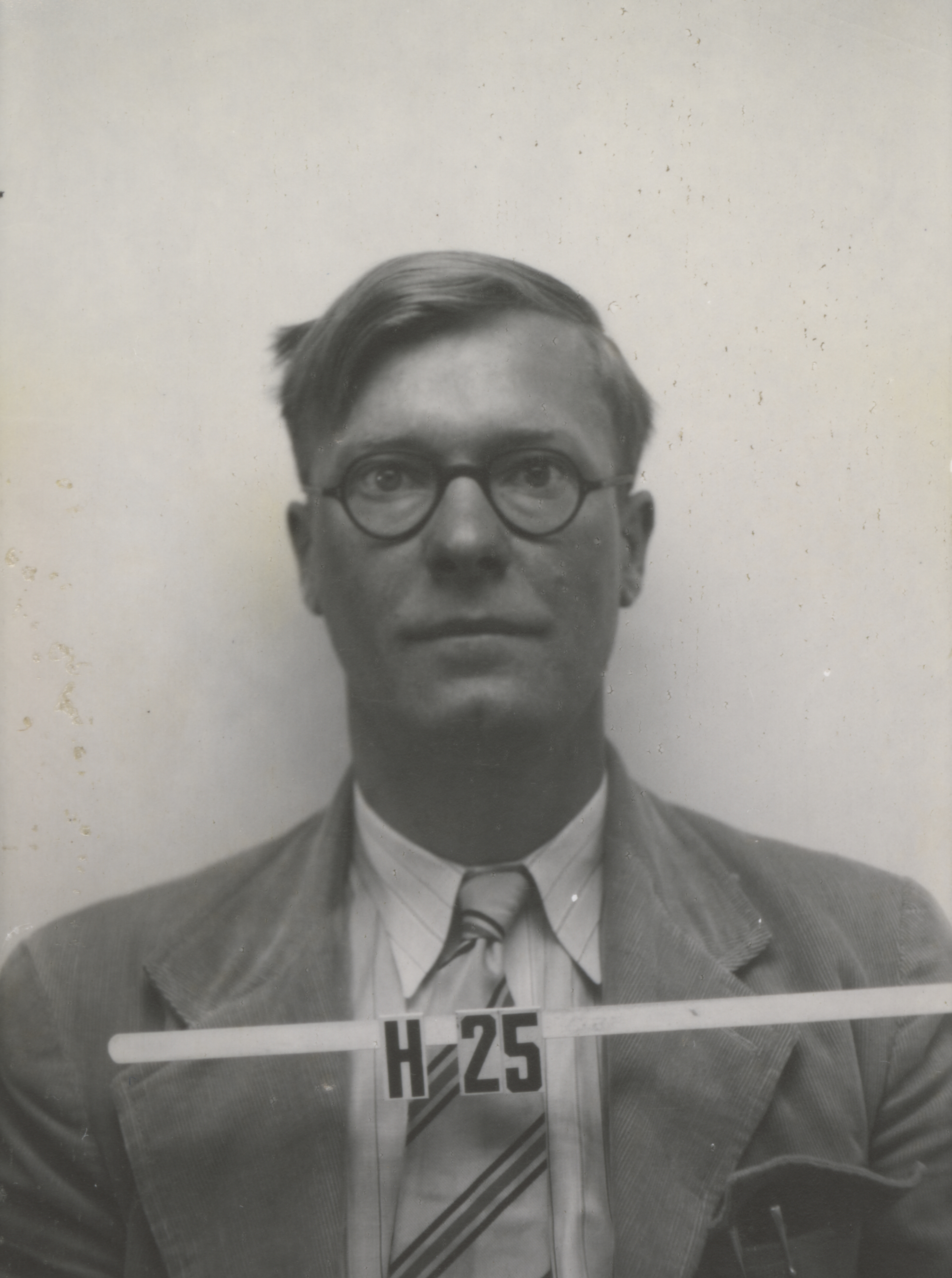
Penney's ID badge photo from Los Alamos National Laboratory of the United States.

The August 1943 Quebec Agreement provided for British support of the American Manhattan Project, which aimed to develop atomic bombs. Over the objections of the Admiralty and Imperial College, Penney was sent to join the team of British scientists at the Manhattan Project's Los Alamos Laboratory in New Mexico, where expertise on explosions and their effects was in demand. At Los Alamos Penney gained recognition for his scientific talents, and also for his leadership qualities and ability to work in harmony with others. Within a few weeks of his arrival he was added to the core group of scientists making key decisions in the direction of the programme. Major General Leslie Groves, the director of the Manhattan Project, later wrote:

Throughout the life of the project, vital decisions were reached only after the most careful consideration and discussion with the men I thought were able to offer the soundest advice. Generally, for this operation, they were Oppenheimer, Von Neumann, Penney, Parsons and Ramsey.

One of Penney's assignments at Los Alamos was to predict the damage effects from the blast wave of an atomic bomb. Soon after he arrived at Los Alamos, he gave a talk on the subject. Fellow Manhattan Project scientist Rudolf Peierls recalled that:

Soon after his arrival he gave a talk about the effect of blast waves on people, including many gruesome details to which his American audience was not accustomed. He presented all this with his usual cheerful manner, and so acquired for a time the sobriquet "the smiling killer."

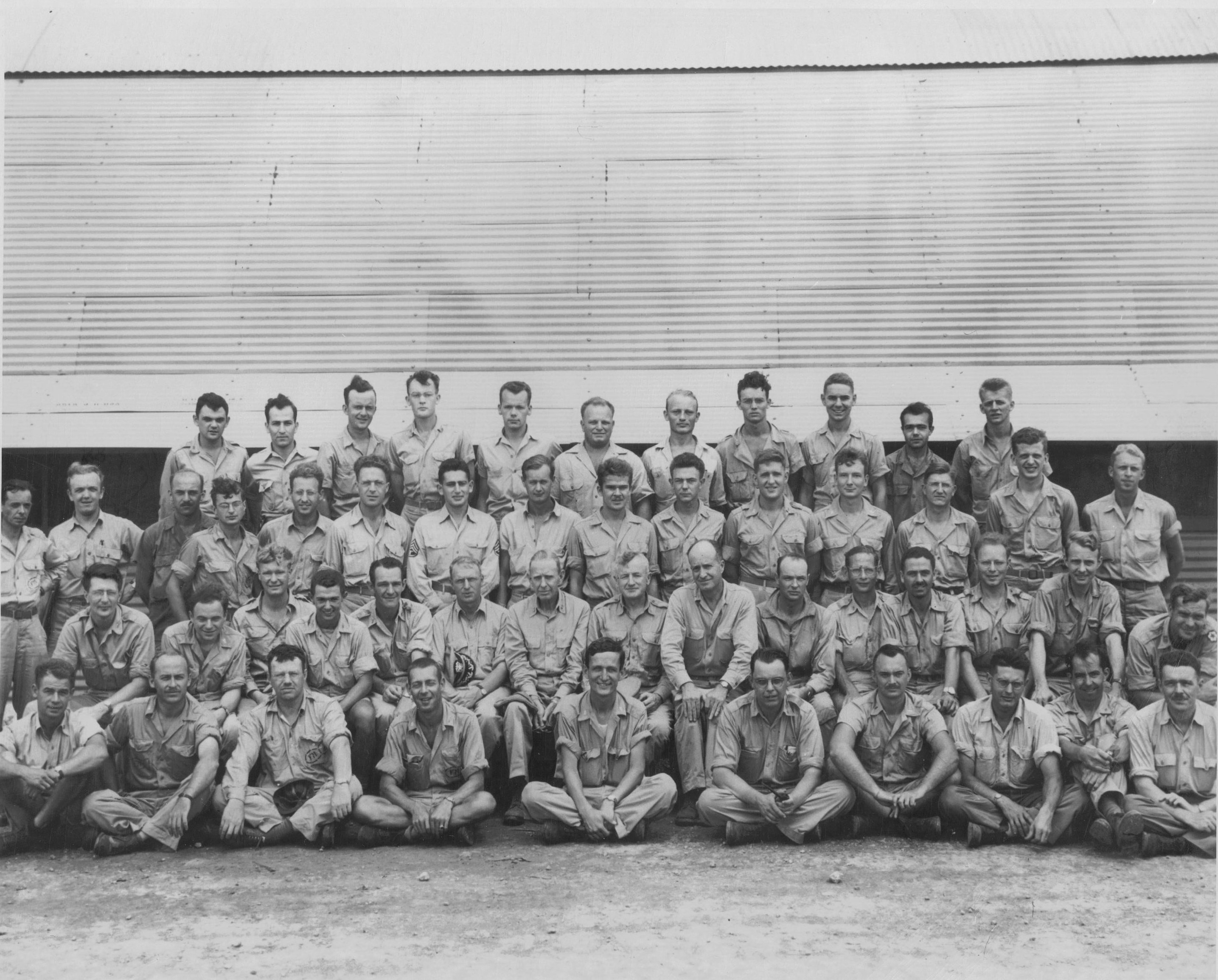
Project Alberta. Penney is in the second row from the front, third from the left

Penney's wife never recovered from post-natal depression after Christopher's birth, and died on 18 April 1945. He arranged for Joan Quennell, a nurse, to look after the boys. He wanted to return home, but Groves told James Chadwick, the British liaison to Manhattan Project in Washington, D.C., that Penney was too important to the project to be released. On 27 April 1945 Penney went to Washington for a target selection meeting. He gave advice regarding the height of the detonation which would ensure optimum destructive effects, whilst ensuring the fireball did not touch the earth, thereby avoiding permanent radiation contamination on the ground. The committee selected four cities from a list of seventeen. Penney attempted to forecast casualties and damage effects, but this was difficult because the exact energy of the bombs was not known. This was answered by the Trinity test detonation on 16 July 1945. Penney was assigned as an observer on an aircraft, but the flight was cancelled due to bad weather, and he did not witness the test. Five days later, Penney gave a presentation on the results of the test, during which he predicted that the bomb would level a city of three or four hundred thousand people.

The following month Penney went to Tinian Island as part of Project Alberta, the group of scientists and military personnel that assembled the atomic bombs. Along with Royal Air Force (RAF) Group Captain Leonard Cheshire from the British Joint Staff Mission in Washington, he represented the United Kingdom. The American authorities stopped them observing the bombing of Hiroshima but, after an appeal to Chadwick, they were permitted to accompany the second mission. On 9 August 1945 Penney witnessed the bombing of Nagasaki, flying with Cheshire in the B-29 observation plane Big Stink. Big Stink missed its rendezvous with the bomber Bockscar, so they witnessed the flash of the Nagasaki detonation from the air at too great a distance to photograph the fireball and the target was obscured by clouds. As the leading expert on the effects of explosions, Penney was a member of the team of scientists and military analysts who entered Hiroshima and Nagasaki following the Japanese surrender on 15 August 1945 to assess the effects of nuclear weapons.

Penney returned to the United Kingdom on a civilian flight from the United States in September 1945. He brought artefacts from Hiroshima and Nagasaki with him, and was charged £450 (equivalent to £17,000 in 2025) for excess baggage. He married Joan Quennell on 3 November 1945. Penney returned to Imperial College, where he wrote a report on Hiroshima and Nagasaki. He estimated that the bomb dropped on the former had a yield of 10 kilotons of TNT (42 TJ) and that of the Nagasaki bomb of about 30 kilotons of TNT (130 TJ). He wanted to return to academic life, and he was offered a chair of mathematics at the University of Oxford.

== British Nuclear Weapons Programme ==
At the end of the war the British government, now under the Labour Prime Minister, Clement Attlee, believed that America would share the technology that British leaders saw as a joint discovery under the terms of the 1943 Quebec Agreement and the 1944 Hyde Park Agreement. In December 1945, Attlee ordered the construction of an atomic pile to produce plutonium and requested a report to detail requirements for Britain's atomic bombs. Penney was approached by C. P. Snow and asked to take up post as Chief Superintendent Armament Research (CSAR, called "Caesar") at Fort Halstead in Kent, as he suspected Britain was going to build an atomic bomb of its own and he wanted Penney in this job. As CSAR he was responsible for all types of armaments research.

In 1946, at the request of Groves and the United States Navy, Penney returned to the United States where he was put in charge of the blast effects studies for Operation Crossroads at Bikini Atoll in the Marshall Islands in July 1946. He wrote the after action reports on the effects of the two nuclear detonations. His reputation was further enhanced when, after the sophisticated test gauges failed in the Able test due to the bomb missing the intended target, he was able to determine the yield using observations from simple devices made from petrol tins. The second test, Baker, was an underwater test, and it impressed Penney greatly. He speculated on the possible effects if an atomic bomb was exploded near a port city in the UK.

The passage of the McMahon Act (Atomic Energy Act) in August 1946 made it clear that Britain would no longer be allowed access to US atomic research. Penney left the United States and returned to the United Kingdom where he drew up plans for an atomic weapons section in his department, submitting them to the Controller of Production, Atomic Energy, Marshal of the Royal Air Force Lord Portal, in November 1946. In January 1947, Penney went to the United States to attend a symposium on the Crossroads tests. With almost all other aspects of atomic co-operation between the countries at an end, his personal role was seen as keeping the contact alive between the parties. He returned to the UK at the end of February 1947.

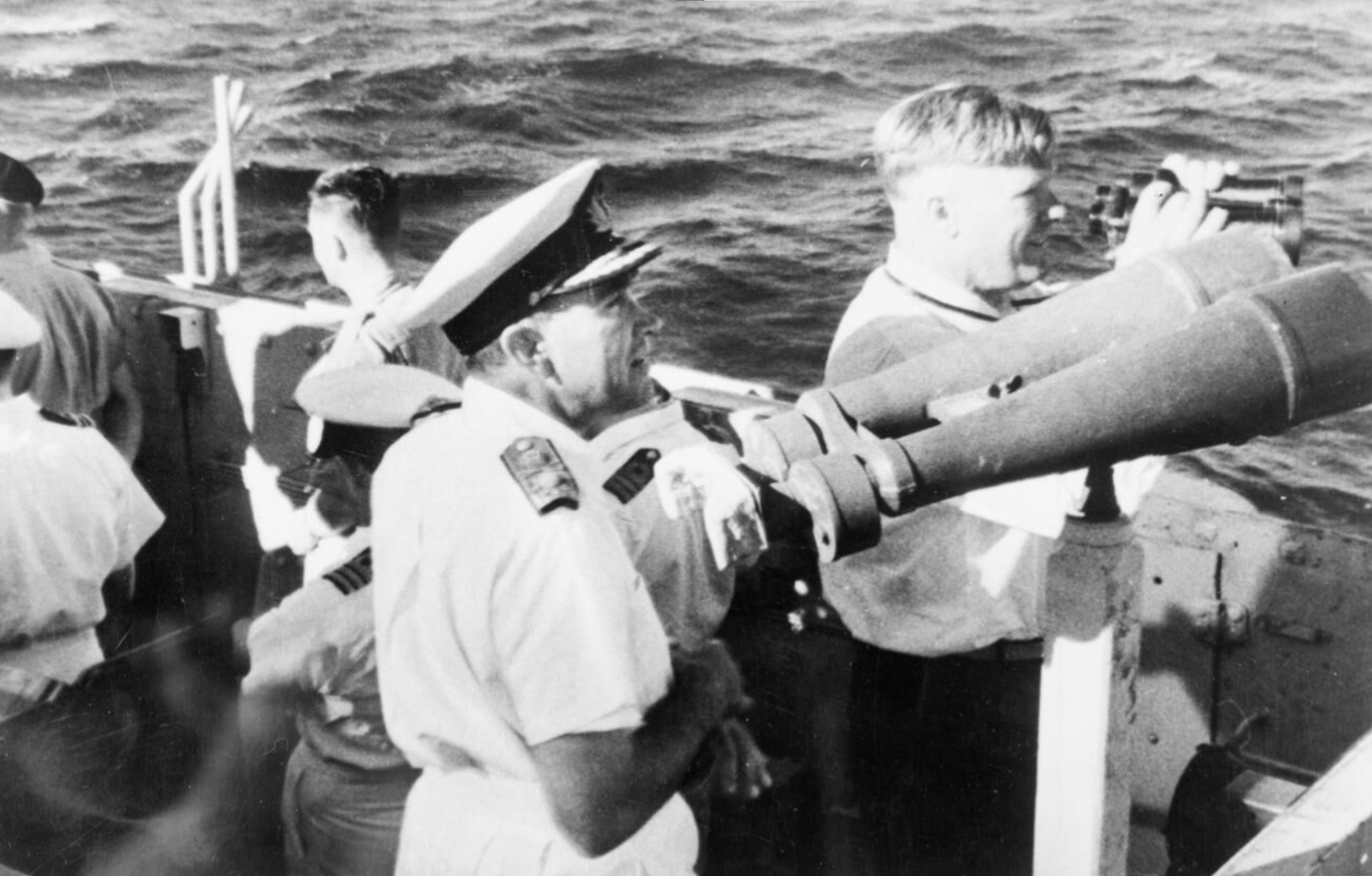
Penney (right) watches the Operation Hurricane nuclear test after the initial flash. With him is Rear Admiral Arthur David Torlesse, the task force commander.

Attlee's government decided that Britain required the atomic bomb to maintain its great power status. In the words of the Foreign Secretary, Ernest Bevin, "We've got to have this thing over here, whatever it costs ... We've got to have the bloody Union Jack flying on top of it." Officially, the decision to proceed with the British atomic bomb project was made in January 1947. The government also endorsed Portal's proposal to place Penney in charge of the bomb development effort. The project was based at the Royal Arsenal, Woolwich, and was code-named "High Explosive Research" (HER). In May 1947, Penney was officially named to head the HER project. The following month he began assembling teams of scientists and engineers to work on the new technologies that had to be developed. He gathered 34 senior members of his fledgling team in the library at the Royal Arsenal and gave a two-hour talk on the principles of how to build an atomic bomb.

By mid-1948, it was clear that Penney's initial estimate that he would require 220 staff was wide of the mark, and that he would need nearly 500. This meant not only taking personnel from other projects, but scrapping some entirely. In October 1948, he submitted a request for developing a new, separate site for HER on grounds of safety, security and economy. This was approved, but it took another six months to locate a suitable site. A former airbase, RAF Aldermaston, was selected.

At the same time, it was decided to separate HER from the Armaments Weapons Research Establishment (AWRE). This resulted in a painful bureaucratic battle over personnel whose expertise was wanted for research on both nuclear weapons and guided missiles. In the end, HER kept 25 of the 30 key personnel that AWRE wanted. The site was taken over on 1 April 1950. Penney became Chief Superintendent High Explosive Research (CSHER). The first stage of work at Aldermaston was completed in December 1951, but the plutonium processing building was only handed over in April 1952, the month that the first plutonium was due to arrive from Windscale. At the peak of construction in 1953, over 4,000 personnel were working on the site. On 3 October 1952, under the code-name "Operation Hurricane", the first British nuclear device was successfully detonated off the west coast of Australia in the Monte Bello Islands.

== British hydrogen bomb ==
Hurricane was but the first series of British nuclear weapons tests in Australia. Further tests required a site on land, so Penney visited Australia and chose a site at Emu Field in South Australia for the Operation Totem test series in 1953. Emu Field proved too remote, so Penney selected a more accessible site at Maralinga. The decision to develop a British hydrogen bomb meant that certain scientific information was urgently required and Maralinga was not yet ready, so a second series of tests, Operation Mosaic, was conducted in the Monte Bello Islands in 1956. The subsequent Operation Buffalo tests were carried out at Maralinga in September and October 1956. Penney personally supervised the Totem and Buffalo tests.

Penney was aware of the public relations issues associated with the tests, and made clear-speaking presentations to the Australian press. Before one series of tests, Lord Carrington, the High Commissioner of the United Kingdom to Australia, described Penney's press presence: "Sir William Penney has established in Australia a reputation which is quite unique: his appearance, his obvious sincerity and honesty, and the general impression he gives that he would rather be digging his garden – and would be, but for the essential nature of his work – have made him a public figure of some magnitude in Australian eyes".

Britain felt the need to quickly develop megaton-class weapons because it seemed that atmospheric testing could soon be outlawed by treaty. As a result, the UK wanted to demonstrate its ability to manufacture megaton-class weapons by proof-testing them before any legal prohibitions were in place. The Prime Minister, Harold Macmillan, hoped to convince the US to change the McMahon Act, which prohibited sharing information even with the British, by demonstrating that the UK had the technology to make a thermonuclear weapon (an H-bomb), and he put Penney in charge of developing this bomb. The Orange Herald bomb was developed and was passed off as a thermonuclear bomb, when in fact it was a boosted fission weapon in which little of the energy came from fusion. The reports were unlikely to have fooled the American observers. The subsequent successful development of British thermonuclear weapons, which coincided with the Sputnik crisis led to the amendment of the McMahon Act, and the re-establishment of the nuclear Special Relationship with the United States.

In the late 1950s there was domestic and international pressure to discontinue atmospheric nuclear testing. Penney headed the UK delegation at a conference convened in Geneva on 1 July 1958. Macmillan took Penney along as an advisor to the conference in Bermuda in December 1961, where Macmillan met with President John F. Kennedy and concluded the Nassau Agreement. Penney continued as the government's advisor on arms control and participated in the preliminary discussion leading up to, and the signing of, the Partial Test Ban Treaty in Moscow in July 1963.

Nuclear development was transferred from the Ministry of Supply (MoS) to the newly formed United Kingdom Atomic Energy Authority (UKAEA). Penney became a member of the UKAEA Board in 1954, and he chaired its official inquiry in the 1957 Windscale fire. When Sir John Cockcroft left in 1959 to become the master of Churchill College, Cambridge, Penney succeeded him as the Member for Scientific Research. He became deputy chairman in 1961 and chairman in 1964. The UKAEA had a difficult working relationship with the Central Electricity Generating Board (CEGB). Penney's management style was to avoid confrontation and seek consensus whenever possible, and the role of the UKAEA in the nuclear power industry was an advisory one. He endorsed the CEGB's 1966 decision to develop the Advanced Gas-cooled Reactor. He took the decision to proceed with the Prototype Fast Reactor at Dounreay and to upgrade the uranium enrichment plant at Capenhurst.

== Imperial College ==
Penney was Rector of Imperial College London from 1967 to 1973. The job was far more trying than he anticipated, and there was no time for personal research. The university sector had expanded rapidly in the 1960s, and there were many personnel and financial difficulties to contend with. There was staff and student unrest that he had to deal with. Penney agreed to have student observers on the Board of Studies, and he brokered deals with the Association of University Teachers. Imperial College now had direct access to University Grants Committee funding and was no longer dependent on the University of London but money was still tight. Careful financial management created a surplus of income over expenditure. The college named the William Penney Laboratory at the South Kensington campus, which opened in 1988, in his honour. He served as the first chairman of the UK's Standing Committee on Structural Safety from 1976 to 1982.

== Honours and awards ==
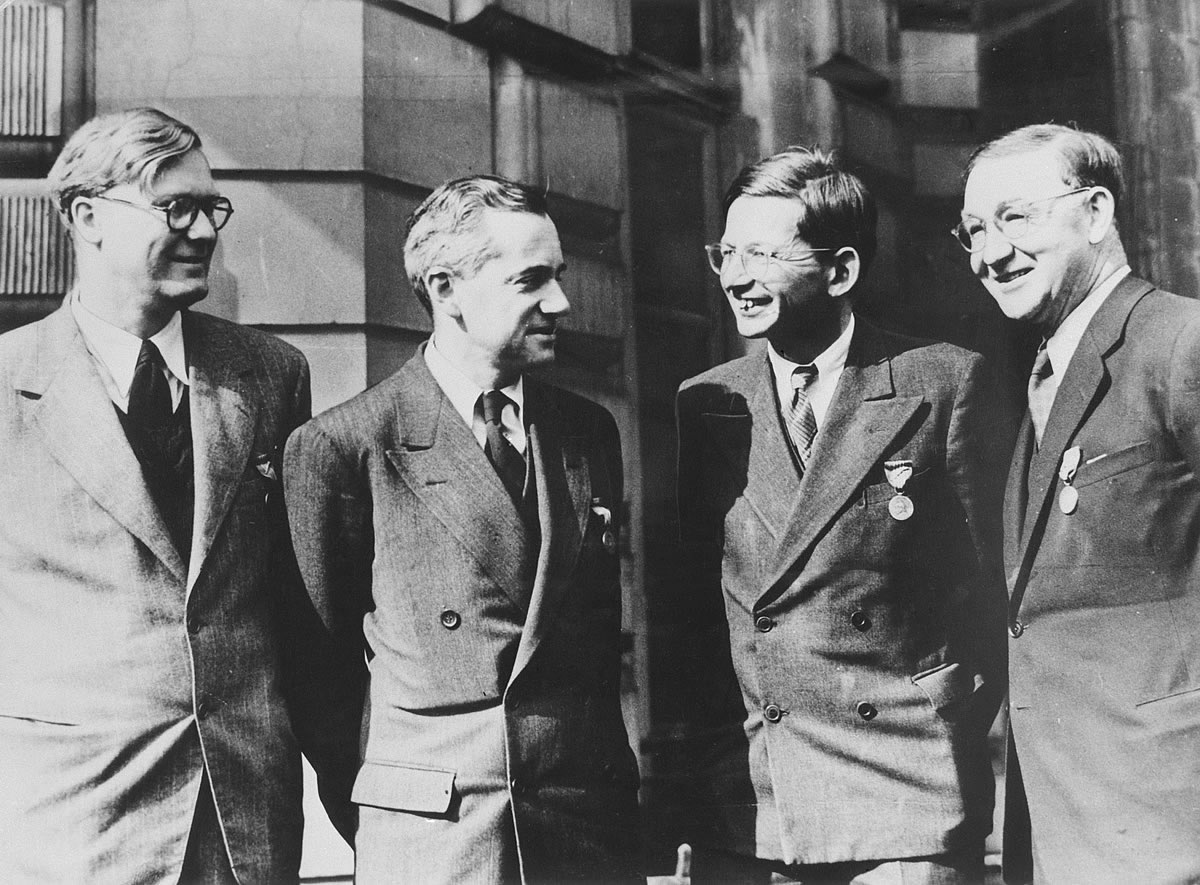
Penney (left) with Otto Frisch, Rudolf Peierls and John Cockcroft after receiving their American Medals of Freedom in 1946.

Penney was made a Fellow of the Royal Society in 1946. He was its treasurer from 1956 to 1960 and vice-president from 1958 to 1969. He became a member of the United States National Academy of Sciences in 1962, a Fellow of the Royal Society of Edinburgh in 1970, and a member of the American Philosophical Society in 1973. He received the Wilhelm Exner Medal in 1967. Among the honours he received in 1969 was the Rumford Medal by the Royal Society, the Glazebrook Medal and Prize of the Institute of Physics and the James Alfred Ewing Medal of the Institution of Civil Engineers, and he was awarded the Kelvin Gold Medal the following year. He was awarded an honorary degree by the University of Melbourne in 1956, the University of Durham in 1957, the University of Oxford in 1959, the University of Bath in 1966 and by the University of Reading in 1970. For his services to the United States, he was awarded the Medal of Freedom in 1946. Penney was appointed an Officer of the Order of the British Empire in 1946, and was raised to Knight Commander of the order in 1952. He was made a life peer, taking the title Baron Penney, of East Hendred in the Royal County of Berkshire on 7 July 1967, and was awarded the Order of Merit in 1969. As a life peer he was entitled to sit in the House of Lords, but did so only twelve times between 1967 and 1973, and voted for only three bills: for sanctions on Rhodesia in 1968, for an amendment to the redistribution bill in 1969, and for the accession of the United Kingdom to the European Communities in 1970.

== Death and legacy ==
In later years he admitted to qualms about his work but felt it was necessary. When aggressively questioned by the McClelland Royal Commission investigating the test programmes at Monte Bello and Maralinga in 1985, he acknowledged that at least one of the twelve tests had unsafe levels of fallout. However, he maintained that due care was taken and that the tests conformed to the internationally accepted safety standards of the time. Jim McClelland broadly accepted Penney's view but anecdotal evidence to the contrary received wide coverage in the press. By promoting a more Australian nationalist view, then current in the government of Bob Hawke, McClelland had also identified "villains" in the previous Australian and British administrations. As a senior witness Penney bore the brunt of the allegations, and his health was badly affected by the experience. He was diagnosed with cancer in 1991, and died on 3 March 1991 at his home in the village of East Hendred, aged 81. He burned his personal papers before he died.

In Penney's obituary in the New York Times he was credited as the "father of the British bomb". The Guardian described him as its "guiding light" and his scientific and administrative leadership was said to be crucial in its successful and timely creation. His leadership of the team that exploded the first British hydrogen bomb at Christmas Island was instrumental in restoring the exchange of nuclear technology between Britain and the US in 1958, and he was credited as playing a leading part in the negotiations which led to the Partial Test Ban Treaty in 1963. His Kronig-Penney model for the behaviour of an electron in a periodic potential is still taught and used today in solid-state physics and is used to explain the origin of band gaps.

== Notes ==
Academic offices
Preceded by Owen Saunders	Rector of Imperial College London; 1967–1973	Succeeded by Brian Flowers
