= Shinkle =

Shinkle is a surname an Americanized form of Schinkel. Notable people with the surname include:

- John G. Shinkle (1912–1995), American major general, first commander of Army Rocket and Guided Missile Agency
- Norm Shinkle (born 1950), American Republican member of Michigan Board of Canvassers
- Caroline Shinkle (born 1993), American attorney (2026 United States House of Representatives elections in New York#District 12)
