= Schinkel =

Schinkel may refer to:

- Schinkel (surname)
- Schinkel (river), river in Amsterdam
- Schinkel, Schleswig-Holstein, municipality in Schleswig-Holstein, Germany
- 5297 Schinkel, main-belt asteroid
- Karl Friedrich Schinkel, Prussian architect, city planner, and painter
- Schinkel Gate, gate in Leipzig, designed by Karl Friedrich Schinkel
