= British nuclear tests at Maralinga =

Atomic weapons tests in Australia, 1956–1963

Maralinga Atomic Test Site in South Australia
- Near Maralinga in Australia

Site information
- Type: Nuclear test range
- Operator: United Kingdom
- Status: Inactive

Location
- Map showing nuclear test sites in Australia
- Coordinates: 30°10′S 131°37′E

Site history
- In use: 1955–1963

Test information
- Nuclear tests: 7
- Remediation: Completed in 2000

Between 1956 and 1963, the United Kingdom conducted seven nuclear tests at the Maralinga site in South Australia, part of the Woomera Prohibited Area about 800 kilometres (500 mi) north-west of Adelaide. Two major test series were conducted: Operation Buffalo in 1956 and Operation Antler the following year. Approximate weapon yields ranged from 1 to 27 kilotons of TNT (4 to 100 TJ). The Maralinga site was also used for minor trials, tests of nuclear weapons components not involving nuclear explosions. The tests codenamed "Kittens" were trials of neutron initiators; "Rats" and "Tims" measured how the fissile core of a nuclear weapon was compressed by the high explosive shock wave; and "Vixens" investigated the effects of fire or non-nuclear explosions on atomic weapons. The minor trials, numbering around 550, ultimately generated far more contamination than the major tests.

Operation Buffalo consisted of four tests; One Tree (12.9 kilotons of TNT (54 TJ)) and Breakaway (10.8 kilotons of TNT (45 TJ)) were detonated on towers, Marcoo (1.4 kilotons of TNT (5.9 TJ)) at ground level, and the Kite (2.9 kilotons of TNT (12 TJ)) was released by a Royal Air Force (RAF) Vickers Valiant bomber from a height of 11,000 metres (35,000 ft). This was the first drop of a British nuclear weapon from an aircraft. Operation Antler in 1957 tested new, light-weight nuclear weapons. Three tests were conducted in this series: Tadje (0.93 kilotons of TNT (3.9 TJ)), Biak (5.67 kilotons of TNT (23.7 TJ)) and Taranaki (26.6 kilotons of TNT (111 TJ)). The first two were conducted from towers, while the last was suspended from balloons. Tadje used cobalt pellets as a tracer for determining yield, resulting in rumours that Britain was developing a cobalt bomb.

The site was left contaminated with radioactive waste, and an initial cleanup was attempted in 1967. The McClelland Royal Commission, an examination of the effects of the minor trials and major tests, delivered its report in 1985, and found that significant radiation hazards still existed at many of the Maralinga sites. It recommended another cleanup, which was completed in 2000 at a cost of AUD $108 million (equivalent to $192 million in 2022). Debate continued over the safety of the site and the long-term health effects on the traditional Aboriginal custodians of the land and former personnel. In 1994, the Australian Government paid compensation amounting to $13.5 million (equivalent to $26.6 million in 2022) to the traditional owners, the Maralinga Tjarutja people. The last part of the land remaining in the Woomera Prohibited Area was returned to free access in 2014.

By the late 1970s there was a marked change in how the Australian media covered the British nuclear tests. Some journalists investigated the subject and political scrutiny became more intense. Journalist Brian Toohey ran a series of stories in the Australian Financial Review in October 1978, based in part on a leaked Cabinet submission. In June 1993, New Scientist journalist Ian Anderson wrote an article titled "Britain's dirty deeds at Maralinga" and several related articles. In 2007, Maralinga: Australia's Nuclear Waste Cover-up by Alan Parkinson documented the unsuccessful clean-up at Maralinga. Popular songs about the Maralinga story have been written by Paul Kelly and Midnight Oil.

== Background ==
During the early part of the Second World War, Britain had a nuclear weapons project, code-named Tube Alloys, which the 1943 Quebec Agreement merged with the American Manhattan Project to create a combined American, British, and Canadian project. The British Government expected that the United States would continue to share nuclear technology, which it regarded as a joint discovery, after the war, but the US Atomic Energy Act of 1946 (McMahon Act) ended technical co-operation. Fearing a resurgence of United States isolationism, and Britain losing its great power status, the British Government restarted its own development effort, under the cover name "High Explosive Research".

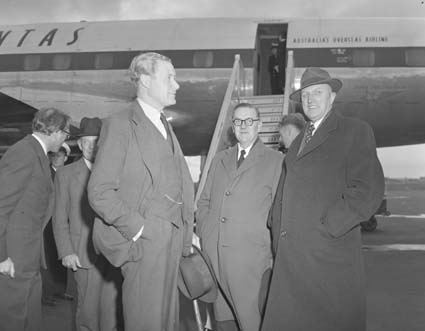
The United Kingdom Minister of Defence, Duncan Sandys (centre), meets with Howard Beale (right), the Australian Minister for Supply, in August 1957

In the 1950s Britain was still Australia's largest trading partner, although it was overtaken by Japan and the United States by the 1960s. Britain and Australia still had strong cultural ties, and Robert Menzies, the Prime Minister of Australia from 1949 to 1966, was strongly pro-British. Most Australians were of British descent, and Britain was still the largest source of immigrants to Australia, mainly because British ex-servicemen and their families qualified for free passage, and other British migrants received subsidised passage on ships from the UK to Australia. Australian and British troops fought together in the Korean War from 1950 to 1953 and the Malayan Emergency that lasted from 1948 to 1960. Australia still maintained close defence ties with Britain through the Australia New Zealand and Malaya (ANZAM) area, which was created in 1948. Australian war plans of this era continued to be integrated with those of Britain, and involved reinforcing British forces in the Middle East and Far East.

The Australian Government had hopes of collaboration with Britain on both nuclear power and nuclear weapons, and was particularly interested in developing the former, for at that time the country was thought to have no oil and only limited supplies of coal. Plans for nuclear power were considered along with hydroelectricity as part of the post-war Snowy Mountains Scheme, but Australia was not a party to the 1948 Modus Vivendi, the nuclear agreement between the US and UK which superseded the wartime Quebec Agreement. This cut Australian scientists off from technical information to which they formerly had access. Britain would not share it with Australia for fear that it might jeopardise the far more important relationship with the United States, and the Americans were reluctant to do so after the Venona project revealed the extent of Soviet espionage activities in Australia. The creation of North Atlantic Treaty Organization (NATO) in 1949 excluded Australia from the Western Alliance.

On 3 October 1952 the United Kingdom tested its first nuclear weapon in Operation Hurricane in the Montebello Islands off the coast of Western Australia. A year later the first nuclear tests on the Australian mainland were carried out in Operation Totem at Emu Field in the Great Victoria Desert in South Australia, with a detonation on 15 October and a second one, two weeks later, on 27 October. The Australian Minister for Supply, Howard Beale, stated in 1955 that "England has the know how; we have the open spaces, much technical skill and a great willingness to help the Motherland. Between us we should help to build the defences of the free world, and make historic advances in harnessing the forces of nature."

== Maralinga site ==
=== Selection ===
Neither the Montebello Islands nor Emu Field were considered suitable as permanent test sites, although Montebello was used again in 1956 for Operation Mosaic. Montebello could be accessed only by sea, and Emu Field had problems with its water supply and dust storms. The British Government's preferred permanent test site remained the Nevada Test Site in the United States, but by 1953 it was no closer to securing access to it than it had been in 1950. When William Penney, the Chief Superintendent Armament Research, visited South Australia in October 1952, he gave the Australian Government a summary of the requirements of a permanent test site. In May 1953, the UK Chiefs of Staff Committee were advised that one was needed. They delegated the task of finding one to Air Marshal Sir Thomas Elmhirst, the chairman of the Totem Executive (Totex), which had been formed in the UK to coordinate the Operation Totem tests. He wrote to J. E. S. Stevens, the permanent secretary of the Australian Department of Supply, and the chairman of the Totem Panel that coordinated the Australian contribution to Operation Totem, and outlined the requirements of a permanent test site, which were:

- A 160 kilometres (100 mi) radius free of human habitation;
- Road and rail communications to a port;
- A nearby airport;
- A tolerable climate for staff and visitors;
- Low rainfall;
- Predictable weather conditions;
- Winds that would carry the fallout safely away from inhabited areas; and
- Reasonably flat terrain;
- Isolation for security.

Elmhirst suggested that a site might be found in Groote Eylandt in the Gulf of Carpentaria or north of Emu Field, where it could be connected by road and rail to Oodnadatta, and where water could more easily be found than at Emu Field. Stevens rated both as unsuitable; Groote Eylandt was wooded and rocky, with a pronounced rainy season, no port facilities, and a long way from the nearest major settlements of Darwin and Cairns; while the area north of Emu Field had scarce water, few roads and was on the axis of the Long Range Weapons Establishment (LRWE), which meant that there would be a competing claim on the use of the area. Group Captain George Pither conducted an aerial survey of the area north of the Trans-Australian Railway between Ooldea and Cook, South Australia. This was followed by a ground reconnaissance in four land rovers and two four-wheel drive trucks by Pither, Wing Commander Kevin Connolly, Frank Beavis (an expert in soil chemistry), Len Beadell and the two truck drivers. An area was found north of Ooldea, and a temporary airstrip was created in two days by land rovers dragging a length of railway line to level it, where Penney, Flight Lieutenant Charles Taplin and Chief Scientist Alan Butement landed in a Bristol Freighter on 17 October 1953, two days after the Totem 1 test at Emu Field.

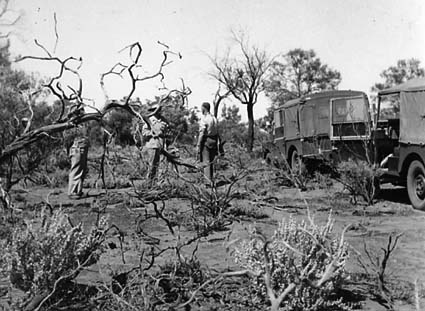
Emu-Ooldea-Tietkens Well reconnaissance

The site, initially known as X.300, was nowhere near as good as the Nevada Test Site, with its excellent communications, but was considered acceptable. It was flat and dry, but not affected by dust storms like Emu Field, and the geologists were confident that the desired 2.5 million imperial gallons (10 megalitres) per annum could be obtained by boring. Rainwater tanks were recommended, and it was estimated that if bore water could not be obtained, a water pipeline could be laid to bring water from Port Augusta. This was estimated to cost AU £53,000 to construct and AU £50,000 per annum to operate. On 25 November, Butement officially named the X.300 site "Maralinga" in a meeting at the Department of Supply. This was an Aboriginal word meaning "thunder", but not in the Western Desert language of the local people; it came from Garik, an extinct language originally spoken around Port Essington in the Northern Territory.

On 2 August 1954, the High Commissioner of the United Kingdom to Australia lodged a formal request for a permanent proving ground for multiple series of nuclear tests expected to be conducted over the course of the next decade and a preliminary agreement between the Australian and British Governments was reached on 26 August. A mission consisting of six officials and scientists headed by J. M. Wilson, the under-secretary of the UK Ministry of Supply (MoS) visited Australia in December to evaluate the Maralinga site, and reported that it was excellent. The new site was officially announced by Beale on 4 April 1955, and the Australian Cabinet gave its assent on 4 May. A formal Memorandum of Arrangements for use of Maralinga was signed on 7 March 1956. It specified that the site would be available for ten years; that no thermonuclear tests would be carried out; that the British Government would be liable for all claims of death or injury to people or damage to property as a result of the tests, except those to British Government personnel; that Australian concurrence would be required before any test could be carried out; and that the Australian authorities would be kept fully informed.

Maralinga was to be developed as a joint facility, co-funded by the British and Australian Governments. The range covered 52,000 square kilometres (20,000 sq mi), with a 260-square-kilometre (100 sq mi) test area. With savings arising from the relocation of buildings, stores and equipment from Emu Field taken into account, the cost of developing Maralinga as a permanent site was estimated to cost AU £1.9 million, compared with AU £3.6 million for Emu Field. The British Government welcomed Australian financial assistance, and Australian participation avoided the embarrassment that would have come from building a UK base on Australian soil. On the other hand, it was recognised that Australian participation would likely mean that the Australians would demand access to even more information than in Operation Totem. This had implications for Britain's relationship with the United States. Sharing information with the Australians would make it harder to secure Britain's ultimate goal, of restoring the wartime nuclear Special Relationship with the United States, and gaining access to information pertaining to the design and manufacture of US nuclear weapons.

=== Development ===
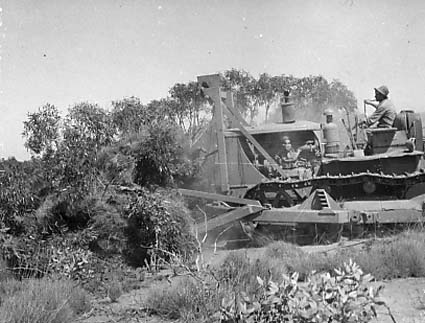
Cutting a temporary access road from Watson to Tietkens Well

A railhead and a quarry were established at Watson, about 40 km (25 mi) west of Ooldea, and Beadell's bush track from Watson to Emu became the main line of communications for the project. It ran north to the edge of the Nullarbor Plain, then over sand hills and the Leisler Range, a mallee, spinifex and quandong covered escarpment, rising to an altitude of 300 metres (1,000 ft). Range headquarters, known as The Village, and an airstrip with a 2,000-metre (6,500 ft) runway were built near the 42-kilometre (26 mi) peg. The track continued north over scrub-cover sand hills to the Teitkins Plain. There at a point that came to be known as Roadside, a control point was established for entry to the forward area where bombs were detonated.

The UK MoS engaged a firm of British engineering consultants, Sir Alexander Gibb & Partners, to design the test facilities and supervise their construction. The work was carried out by the Kwinana Construction Group (KCG) under a cost-plus contract. It had just finished the construction of an oil refinery near Fremantle, and it was hoped that it could move on to the new venture immediately, but the delay in obtaining Cabinet's approval meant that work could not start until mid-1955, by which time most of its work force had dispersed. The need to create a new work force caused a cascading series of delays. Assembling a labour force of 1,000 from scratch in such a remote location proved difficult, even when KCG was offering wages as high as AU £40 a week (equivalent to AUD$3,182 in 2022).

The Australian Government elected to create a tri-service task force to construct the test installations. The Australian Army's Engineer in Chief, Brigadier Ronald McNicoll designated Major Owen Magee, the Commander, Royal Australian Engineers, Western Command, to lead this task force. He joined a party headed by Lieutenant Colonel John Blomfield, the MoS Atomic Weapons representative in Australia, on a site inspection, and then flew to the Atomic Weapons Research Establishment (AWRE) at Aldermaston in the UK in a Royal Air Force (RAF) Handley Page Hastings to review the plans. These were still incomplete, but it gave Magee sufficient information to prepare estimates of the labour and equipment that would be required. The job involved the erection of towers, siting of instrument mounts, grading of 310 km (190 mi) of tracks, laying control cables and power lines, and construction of bunkers and other facilities dispersed over an area of 210 km^{2} (80 mi^{2}) but sited to within an accuracy of 30 cm (1 ft). The work force could not be fully assembled before 1 March 1956, but the facilities had to be ready for use by the end of July. Magee provided Bloomfield with a list of required stores and equipment. These ranged from timber and nails to drafting gear and two 10-centimetre (4 in) wagon drills.

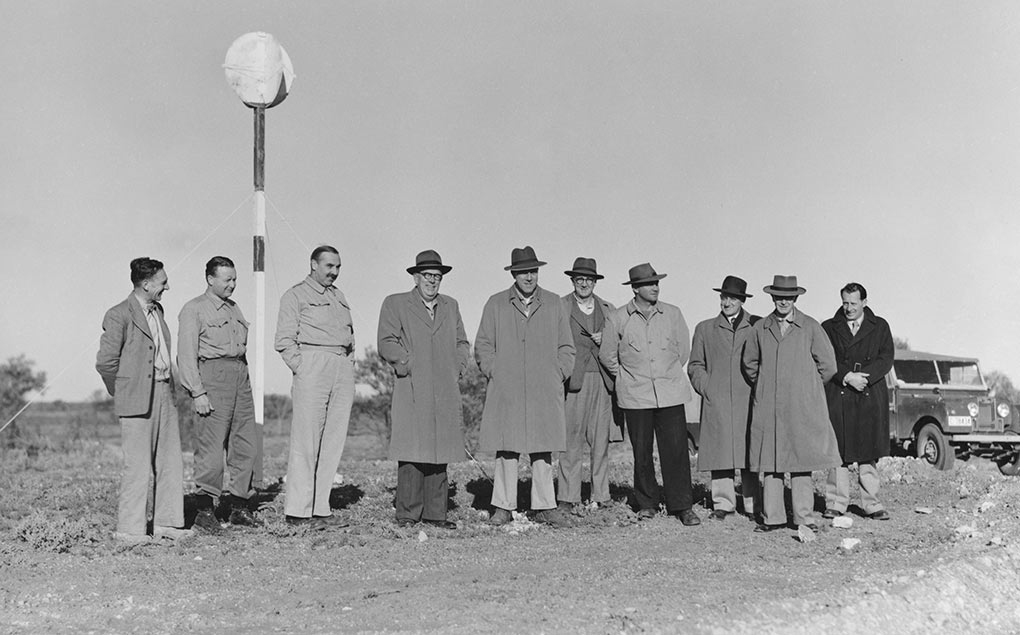
Maralinga Committee visits the site. Butement is third from the left.

The task force, which began assembling in February 1956, included a section from the Royal Australian Survey Corps, a troop of the 7th Field Squadron, detachments from the Royal Australian Navy (RAN) and Royal Australian Air Force (RAAF), and a civilian from the Department of Works and Housing. Their first task was establishing their own camp, with tents, showers and toilets. A team from the South Australian Department of Mines sank a series of 90-to-350-metre (300 to 1,150 ft) bores to provide water. Like that at Emu Field, the bore water was brackish. Two Army skid-mounted 11-kilolitre-per-day (3,000 US gal/d) Cleaver-Brooks thermocompression distillation units provided water for drinking and cooking. Work on the facilities themselves got off to a slow start, as KCG was running behind schedule, and unable to release promised earthmoving plant. Some graders were used by day by KCG and by night by the task force. A call to Blomfield resulted in a grader being shipped from Adelaide to Watson two days later. The arrival of a 23-man detachment of the Radiation Detection Unit of the Corps of Royal Canadian Engineers was expedited so they arrived in June, and were able to pitch in with the construction effort. In July, supplies coming from the UK were delayed by industrial action at the port of Adelaide.

The work involved laying, testing and burying some 310 kilometres (190 mi) of control cable. Each 490-metre (1,600 ft) spool of cable weighed about 1 tonne (1 long ton), so where possible they were pre-positioned. The trenches were dug by a cable plough towed by a Caterpillar D8 tractor. In some cases the limestone was too hard for the plough and the cable was buried by using a grader to cover the cable to the required depth. A similar procedure was followed for laying 2,400 metres (8,000 ft) of power cable. Some 1,300 scaffold frames were erected for mounting instrumentation, held in place by 33,000 anchor pipes. Bunkers ranging in size up to 45 cubic metres (1,600 cu ft) were excavated with explosives and a 10-kilolitre-per-minute (350 cu ft/min) compressor mounted on a four-wheel drive 3-ton Bedford truck connected to the jackhammer part of the 4-inch wagon drill. Explosives were in the form of 2.3-kilogram (5 lb) tubes of plastic explosive left over from a Bureau of Mineral Resources seismic survey of the area. The bunker work proceeded so well that the task force was able to assist KCG with its pit excavation work. Some instrument bunkers contained 3-metre (10 ft) steel cubes. Getting them into the holes was tricky because they weighed 30 long tons (30 t), and the largest available crane was a 25-long-ton (25 t) Coles crane. They were manoeuvred into place with the assistance of a TD 24 bulldozer. The Coles crane was also used to erect the two 30-metre (100 ft) shot towers. Concrete was made in situ, using local quarry dust, limestone and bore water. The Canadians erected metal sheds of a commercial design, which were used to assess blast damage. A tented camp was built for observers at the 11-mile (18 km) post by the 23rd Construction Squadron.

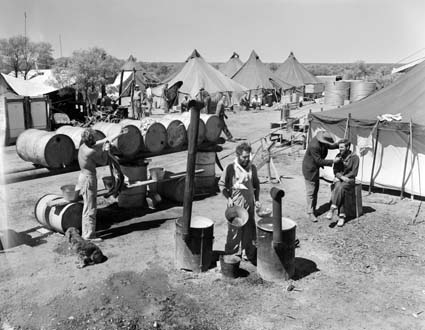
Giles Weather Station in 1955. The 44-gallon drums hold bore water.

Pressed for time, Magee became involved in a series of disputes with the Woomera Range commander, who tried to divert his sappers onto other tasks. In June, the range commander ordered the surveyors to return to Adelaide, which would have brought the work at Maralinga to a halt. Magee went over his head and appealed to the commander of Central Command, Major General Arthur Wilson, who flew up from Adelaide and sacked the range commander. Impressed by what he saw at Maralinga, Wilson arranged for the task force to receive a special Maralinga allowance of 16 Australian shillings per day (equivalent to AUD$64 in 2022), and additional leave of two days per month. The British Government added a generous meal allowance of GBP £1 (equivalent to AUD$127 in 2022) per day, resulting in a diet of steak, ham, turkey, oysters and crayfish. In June, Beale flew in two planeloads of journalists, including Chapman Pincher and Hugh Buggy for a press conference. The task force completed all its work on 29 July, two days ahead of schedule, although KCG still had a few remaining tasks.

By 1959, the Maralinga village would have accommodation for 750 people, with catering facilities that could cope with up to 1,600. There were laboratories and workshops, shops, a hospital, church, power station, post office, bank, library, cinema and swimming pool. There were also playing areas for tennis, Australian football, cricket and golf.

== Atomic Weapons Tests Safety Committee ==
Leslie Martin, the scientific adviser at the Department of Defence, could see no issues with the proposed tests, but recommended that in view of the prospect of tests being conducted at Maralinga on a regular basis, and rising concern worldwide over radioactive fallout from nuclear tests, that a permanent body be established to certify the safety of the tests. This was accepted, and the acting secretary of the Department of the Prime Minister and Cabinet, Frederick Chilton, put forward the names of five scientists: Butement; Martin; Ernest Titterton from the Australian National University in Canberra; Philip Baxter from the Australian Atomic Energy Commission; and Cecil Eddy from the Commonwealth X-ray and Radium Laboratory. Butement, Martin and Titterton had already been observers at the Operation Mosaic and Operation Totem tests. The Department of Defence favoured a committee of three, but Menzies felt that such a small committee would not command sufficient public confidence, and accepted all five. A notable omission was the lack of a meteorologist, and Leonard Dwyer, the director of the Bureau of Meteorology was later added. The Atomic Weapons Tests Safety Committee (AWTSC) was officially formed on 21 July 1955.

== Aboriginal affairs ==
Menzies told parliament that "no conceivable injury to life, men or property could emerge from the tests". The Maralinga site was inhabited by the Pitjantjatjara and Yankunytjatjara Aboriginal people, for whom it had a great spiritual significance. They lived through hunting and gathering activities, and moved over long distances between permanent and semi-permanent locations in groups of about 25, but coming together for special occasions. The construction of the Trans-Australian Railway in 1917 had disrupted their traditional patterns of movement. Walter MacDougall had been appointed the Native Patrol Officer at Woomera on 4 November 1947, with responsibility for ensuring that Aboriginal people were not harmed by the LRWE's rocket testing program. He was initially assigned to the Department of Works and Housing but was transferred to the Department of Supply in May 1949. As the range of the rockets increased, so too did the range of his patrols, from 576 kilometres (358 mi) in October 1949 to 3,486 kilometres (2,166 mi) in March and April 1952. MacDougall felt that his situation was not appreciated by his superiors, who did not supply him with a vehicle for his own use for three years.

MacDougall estimated that about 1,000 Aboriginal people lived in the Central Australian reserve, which extended to the border with Western Australia. He found them reluctant to reveal important details such as the location of water holes and sacred sites. His first concern was for their safety, and for that he needed to keep them away from the test site. For this he employed three strategies. The first was to remove the incentive to go there. An important lure was the availability of rations at Ooldea and surrounding missions, so he had them closed. The Ooldea mission was closed in June 1952, and the reserve was revoked in February 1954. The inhabitants were moved to a new settlement at Yalata, but many ritual objects had been concealed and left behind. They preferred the landscape of the desert, and many left Yalata to return to their traditional lands. A more successful tactic was to frighten them. The desert was said to be inhabited by wanampi, dangerous rainbow serpent spirits that lived in blowholes in the area. The noise of the nuclear tests was attributed to wanampi, as were the dangers of radiation. The decision to establish the Giles Weather Station in the Rawlinson Ranges was a complicating factor because it was outside MacDougall's jurisdiction, being just across the border in Western Australia, where the legal environment was different, and the Aboriginal people there had little contact with white people. Another patrol officer position was created, one with powers under the 1954 Western Australian Native Welfare Act, which was filled by a Sydney University graduate, Robert Macaulay.

== Operation Buffalo ==
Buffalo
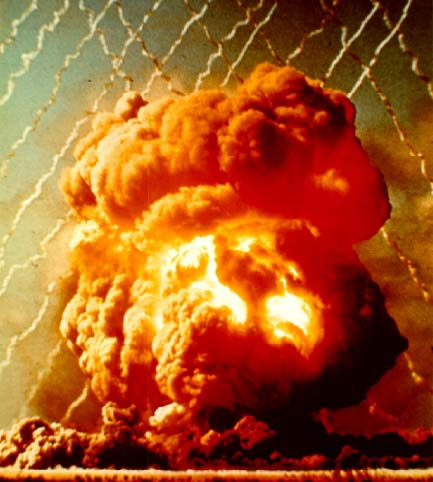
- Buffalo R4/Breakaway nuclear test

Information
- Country: United Kingdom
- Test site: Maralinga Range, SA
- Period: 27 September – 22 October 1956
- Number of tests: 4
- Test type: air drop, dry surface, tower
- Max. yield: 15 kilotons of TNT (63 TJ)

Test series chronology

=== Planning and purpose ===
Operation Buffalo was the first nuclear test series to be conducted at Maralinga, and the largest ever held in Australia. Planning for the series, initially codenamed Theta, began in mid-1954. It was initially scheduled for April and May 1956, but was pushed back to September and October, when meteorological conditions were most favourable. Ultimately all tests on the Australian mainland were conducted at this time of year. The 1954 plan for Operation Theta called for four tests, each with a different purpose.

The UK's first nuclear weapon, Blue Danube, was large and cumbersome, being 7.3 metres (24 ft) long and 1.5 metres (5 ft) wide, and weighed 4,500 kilograms (10,000 lb), so only the Royal Air Force (RAF) V-bombers could carry it. In November 1953, the RAF and Royal Navy issued an Operational Requirement, OR.1127, for a smaller, lighter weapon with similar yield that could be carried by tactical aircraft. A second requirement for a light-weight bomb arose with the British Government's decision in July 1954 to proceed with a British hydrogen bomb programme. Hydrogen bombs required an atomic bomb as a primary, and one was incorporated in the British hydrogen bomb design, known as Green Granite.

In response, Aldermaston developed a new warhead called Red Beard that was half the size of Blue Danube and weighed one-fifth as much, mainly through innovation in the pit design, principally the use of an "air lens". Instead of the core being immediately inside the tamper, there was an air gap between them, with the core suspended on thin wires. This allowed the tamper to gain more momentum before striking the core. The concept had been developed by the Manhattan Project in 1945 and 1946, and permitted a reduction in both the size of the core and the amount of explosives required to compress it.

The first test on the agenda was therefore of the new Red Beard design. OR.1127 also specified a requirement for the device to have variable yields, which Aldermaston attempted to achieve through the addition of small amounts of thermonuclear material, a process known as "boosting". A 91-metre (300 ft) tower was built at Maralinga for a boosted weapon test in case sufficient lithium deuteride could not be produced in time for the Operation Mosaic G2 test. In the event, it was available, and G2 went ahead as scheduled. Various tests of the effects of nuclear weapons were considered, but only one thought to be worth the effort was a test of a ground burst. These were known to produce more fallout and less effect than air bursts, and had therefore been avoided by the Americans, but such a test might produce useful information that the UK might trade with them. A ground test was therefore included in the schedule. A fourth test was an operational test. While the physics package of Blue Danube had been tested, there had been no test of the device in its operational form, so one was included in the Operation Buffalo program.

The interdepartmental Atomic Trials Executive in London, chaired by Lieutenant General Sir Frederick Morgan, assumed responsibility for both Operation Mosaic and Operation Buffalo, sitting as the Mosaic Executive (Mosex) or Buffalo Executive (Buffalex) as appropriate. Sir William Penney was appointed scientific director for Operation Buffalo, with Roy Pilgrim, the head of Aldermaston's Trials Division, as his deputy. Group Captain Cecil (Ginger) Weir was appointed Task Force Commander. Planning was completed by June 1956. Except for the air drop, all tests were scheduled for 07:00 Central Standard Time. About 1,350 personnel would be present, including 200 scientists from Aldermaston and Harwell, 70 from other UK departments, 50 Canadians and 30 Australians. There would be 500 RAF and RAAF personnel, and 250 Australian Army servicemen to run the camp. Observers would include politicians, journalists, and six American officials, including Major General Leland S. Stranathan from the Armed Forces Special Weapons Project, Alvin C. Graves from the Los Alamos Scientific Laboratory, Frank H. Shelton from Sandia Laboratories and Brigadier General John G. Shinkle from the White Sands Missile Range.

=== Test 1: One Tree ===
The first test, codenamed One Tree, was a tower-mounted test of Red Beard, scheduled for 12 September. This was the main test to which the media were invited. Butement, Dwyer, Martin and Titterton from the AWTSC were present, and Beale arrived from Canberra with a delegation of 26 politicians, but weather conditions were unfavourable, and the test had to be postponed.

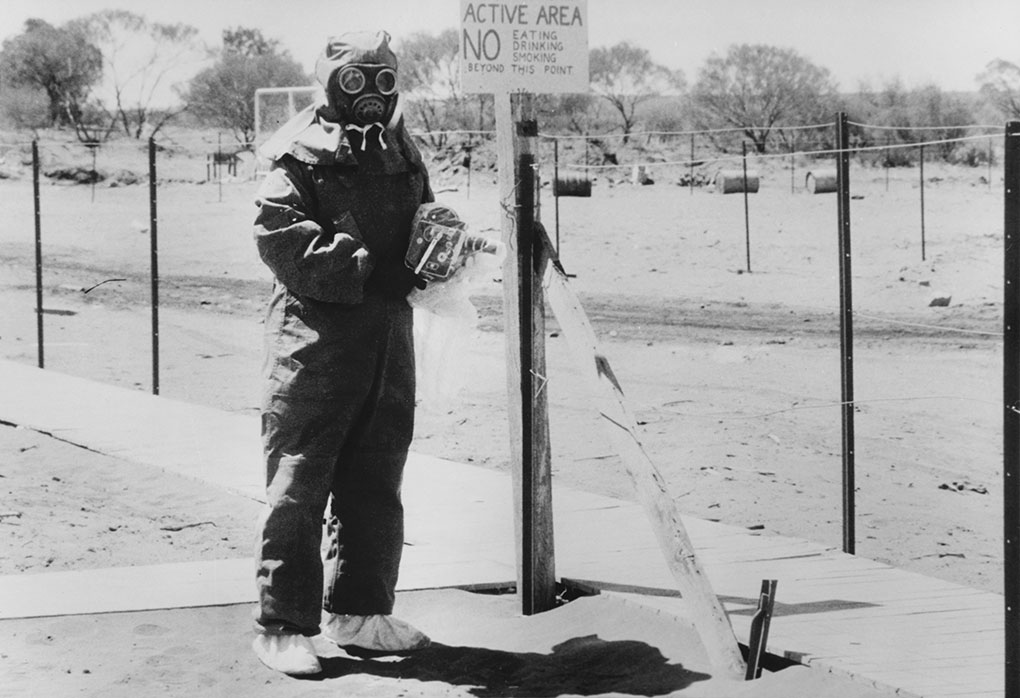
John L Stanier at Maralinga in protective clothing with a camera protected in a special plastic cover

The schedule was revised to allow for a morning (07:00) or evening (17:00) test, and after a few days of unfavourable weather it was rescheduled for 23 September. Once again the politicians arrived but returned disappointed. This put Penney under great pressure. On the one hand, if Maralinga was to be used for many years then riding roughshod over Australian concerns about safety at an early date was inadvisable; on the other, there was the urgent need to test Red Beard in time for the upcoming Operation Grapple, the test of a British hydrogen bomb. Whether Buffalo or Grapple was more important was the subject of debate in the UK between Willis Jackson, who argued for Buffalo, and Bill Cook, who argued for Grapple. Jackson's view prevailed; Grapple would be postponed if need be.

Australian journalists were critical of the cancellations. There were allegations that the delays had caused the deaths of cattle that had contracted Redwater fever while waiting for a ship that was delayed due to the tests, and there were concerns about the cost of delays, said to be up to AU £10,000 per postponement, and whether Maralinga was a suitable site after all. Finally, the test was carried out at 17:00 on 27 September without the politicians. Conditions were suitable but "by no means ideal". It would have been preferable if the wind had been more southerly, and there had been more wind shear above 4,600 metres (15,000 ft). The prevailing conditions meant that the fallout pattern would be long and narrow, and more concentrated over the nearest town in its path, which was Coober Pedy, 317 kilometres (197 mi) away.

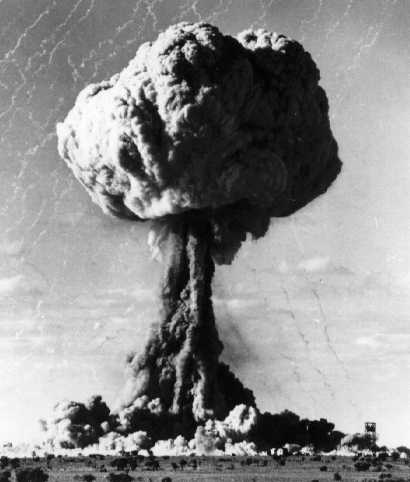
Buffalo R1/One Tree nuclear test

Some observers were surprised that the detonation seemed to be silent; the sound wave arrived a few seconds later. The yield was estimated at 16 kilotons of TNT (67 TJ). The cloud rose to 11,400 metres (37,500 ft), much higher than expected. After about eight minutes, a Canberra bomber flew through the cloud to collect samples. Along with a secondary cloud that formed between 5,000 and 7,000 metres (16,500 and 23,000 ft), it drifted eastward. The main cloud crossed the east coast at about 11:00 on 28 September, followed by the secondary between 12 and 18 hours later. Rain on 29 September deposited some fallout between Brisbane in Queensland and Lismore in New South Wales.

=== Test 2: Marcoo ===
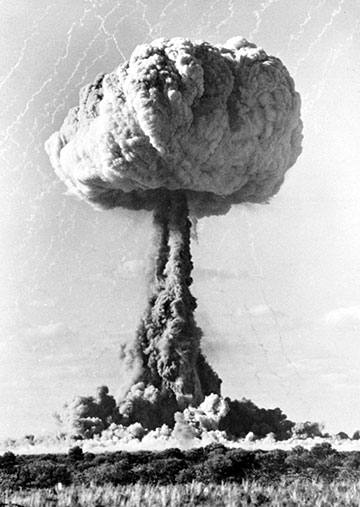
Buffalo R2/Marcoo nuclear test

The next test was Marcoo, a ground test using a Blue Danube device with a low-yield core. In the hope that sharing the results might lead to fuller cooperation, the test had been discussed with the Americans by the British Joint Staff Mission in Washington, D.C., and they had been sufficiently interested to offer the use of American instrumentation and personnel. Fearful of giving away too much information, the British accepted the instrumentation only. The weapon was lowered into a concrete pit. This time the weather was good, but the aircraft bringing Beale and the politicians was delayed by fog in Canberra. It arrived at Maralinga at 15:40, and they had to be rushed to the viewing platform on Observation hill. The bomb was detonated precisely on time, at 16:30, with a yield of 1.5 kilotons of TNT (6.3 TJ). It left a crater 49 metres (160 ft) wide and 12 metres (40 ft) deep. The fallout crossed the east coast 25 to 30 hours after the detonation.

=== Test 3: Kite ===
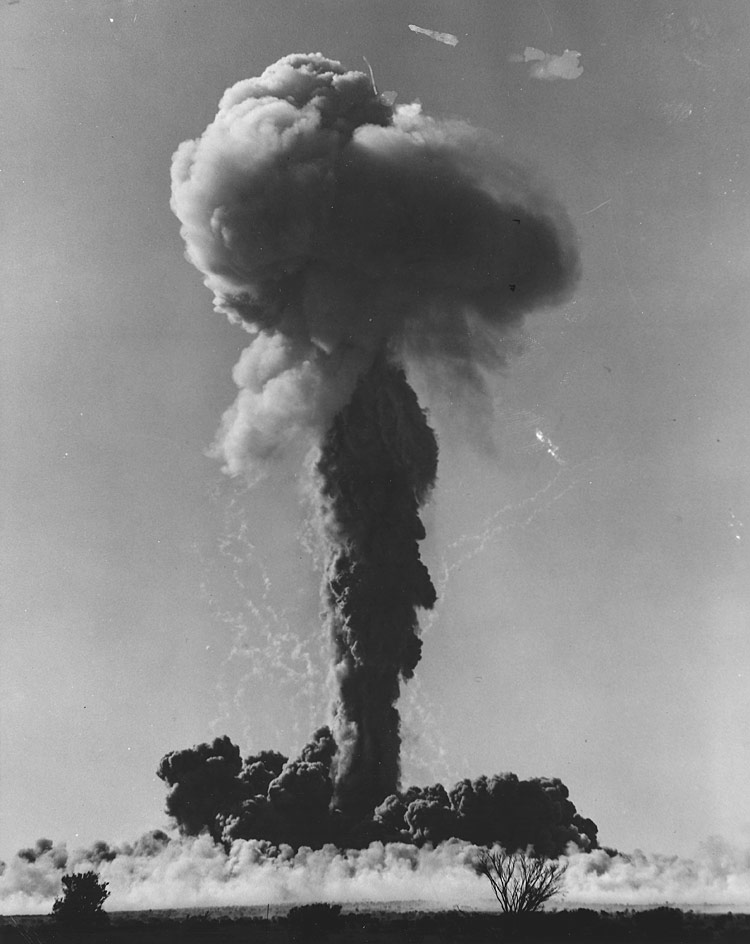
Buffalo R3/Kite nuclear test

Kite was an air drop using a Blue Danube device with a low-yield core, the only air drop conducted during Operation Buffalo. Originally the air drop was supposed to be the last test of Operation Buffalo, but after the Marcoo shot, Penney decided to swap the last two tests, making the air drop the third test. The air drop was the most difficult test, as the worst-case scenario involved the radar fuses failing and the bomb detonating on impact with the ground, which would result in severe fallout. The RAF therefore conducted a series of practice drops with high explosive bombs. In the end, in view of the AWTSC's concerns about the dangers of a 40-kiloton-of-TNT (170 TJ) test, a low-yield Blue Danube core with less fissile material was substituted, reducing the yield to 3 kilotons of TNT (13 TJ). Titterton and Dwyer were on hand for the shot.

On 11 October 1956, Valiant B.1 WZ366 of No. 49 Squadron RAF became the first RAF aircraft to drop a live atomic bomb. It fell about 91 metres (100 yd) left and 55 metres (60 yd) short of the target, detonating at a height of 150 metres (490 ft) at 15:27. The yield was 3 kilotons of TNT (13 TJ). The pilot, Squadron Leader Edwin Flavell, and the bomb aimer, Flight Lieutenant Eric Stacey, were awarded the Air Force Cross in the 1957 New Year Honours. Fallout was minimal. Two clouds formed, a low-level one at about 2,100 metres (7,000 ft) that dropped all its radioactive material inside the prohibited area, and a high-level one at 3,700 metres (12,000 ft) that deposited a negligible amount of fallout over South Australia, Victoria and New South Wales.

=== Test 4: Breakaway ===
The final test, Breakaway, was of a boosted Red Beard device. The shot was conducted from a 30-metre (100 ft) tower. Once again there were delays due to unfavourable weather that pushed it back from 18 to 22 October. It was detonated at 00:05 on 22 October, with a yield of about 10 kilotons of TNT (42 TJ). As on previous tests, the fallout was measured using sticky paper, air sampling devices, and water sampled from rainfall and reservoirs. This time the cloud was tracked with the help of a Trans Australia Airlines (TAA) Douglas DC-4 diverted from its flight path. The cloud reached 11,000 metres (35,000 ft) but soon became widely dispersed between Darwin in the Northern Territory and Newcastle in New South Wales. The highest reading recorded by the ground survey was at Ingomar, South Australia, about 310 kilometres (190 mi) from the test site.

=== Summary ===
United Kingdom's Buffalo series tests and detonations
| Name | Date + time (UTC) | Local time | Location | Elevation + height | Delivery | Purpose | Device | Yield | References |
|---|---|---|---|---|---|---|---|---|---|
| 1/One Tree | 27 September 1956 07:30 | 17:00 ACST (9.5 hrs) | Maralinga Range, SA 29.8688°S 131.6593°E | 180 m (590 ft) + 31 m (102 ft) | Tower | Weapons development | Red Beard | 15 kt | |
| 2/Marcoo | 4 October 1956 07:00 | 16:30 ACST (9.5 hrs) | Maralinga Range, SA 29.8818°S 131.6247°E | 180 m (590 ft) + 0.2 m (7.9 in) | Dry surface | Weapon effect | Blue Danube | 1.5 kt | |
| 3/Kite | 11 October 1956 05:57 | 15:27 ACST (9.5 hrs) | Maralinga Range, SA 29.8892°S 131.6581°E | 180 m (590 ft) + 150 m (490 ft) | Air drop | Weapons development | Blue Danube | 3 kt | |
| 4/Breakaway | 21 October 1956 14:35 | 00:05 ACST (9.5 hrs) | Maralinga Range, SA 29.8931°S 131.6047°E | 190 m (620 ft) + 31 m (102 ft) | Tower | Weapons development | Red Beard | 10 kt | |

== Operation Antler ==
Antler

Information
- Country: United Kingdom
- Test site: Maralinga Range, SA
- Period: 14 September – 9 October 1957
- Number of tests: 3
- Test type: balloon, tower
- Max. yield: 26.6 kilotons of TNT (111 TJ)

Test series chronology

=== Planning and purpose ===
The July 1956 Suez Crisis brought US-UK relations to a low ebb, rendering the prospect of the use of US facilities in the near future remote. On 20 September 1956, the UK High Commissioner informed Menzies of the UK's intention to continue minor trials in March through October 1957, with another major test series in September and October. The main implication was that the range would be in use for most of the year. A minimum of 228 personnel would be required all year round, rising to 354 from March to July, and 400 from July to October. The codename Sapphire was initially allocated to the 1957 test series, but the RAF complained that that codename had already been allocated to the Armstrong Siddeley Sapphire aircraft engine. The name was briefly changed to Volcano until the Australians objected, and then to Antler.

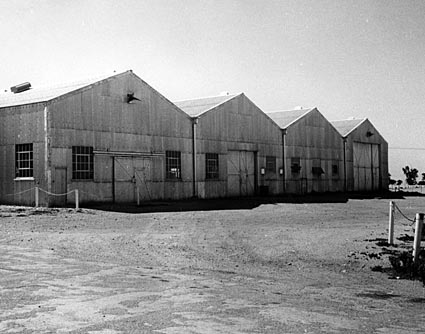
Atomic test site at Maralinga – Workshops

At the AWTSC meeting on 7 December 1956, Martin suggested that the committee be reconstituted. A three-person Maralinga Safety Committee chaired by Titterton, with Dwyer and D. J. Stevens from the Commonwealth X-ray and Radium Laboratory as its other members, would be responsible for the safety of nuclear weapons tests, while a National Radiation Advisory Committee (NRAC) consider public health more generally. This reflected growing disquiet among the scientific community and the public at large over the effects of all atmospheric nuclear weapons testing, not just those in Australia, and growing calls for a test ban. Nonetheless, Operation Buffalo had attracted little international attention. The British Government rejected calls for a moratorium on testing, and announced at the US-UK talks in Bermuda in March 1957 that it would press on with the Operation Grapple hydrogen bomb tests. Martin's proposal was accepted, and the composition of the new NRAC was announced on 7 July 1957. John Moroney was appointed secretary of both committees. The AWTSC continued to report to the Minister of Supply, while the NRAC reported directly to the Prime Minister.

The first round of Operation Grapple tests was unsuccessful in demonstrating a working hydrogen bomb design. This left plans for Operation Antler in disarray. By mid-June 1957, proposals for Antler included up to seven tests: a surface-to-air warhead called Blue Fox, a small warhead called Pixie, four different versions of Red Beard, and a round designed to test the principle of radiation implosion. Initially it was planned to test Blue Fox (later renamed Indigo Hammer) in both boosted and unboosted form, but the disappointing results of boosting thus far meant that the benefit of boosting would be too small to warrant it, and this version was discarded. Pixie was an even smaller, lightweight (110-kilogram (250 lb)) warhead with a plutonium core under consideration for use with the Royal Navy's Seaslug missile. Its drawback was that it required enough plutonium to build two Red Beards, and plutonium was scarce and expensive. In February 1957, the Australian authorities were notified of plans for six tests, including three using balloons, with maximum yields of up to 80 kilotons of TNT (330 TJ).

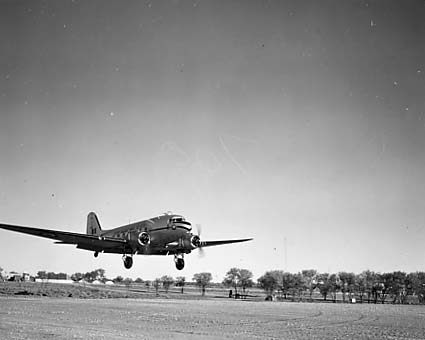
A DC3 lands at the 43-mile (69 km) airstrip at Maralinga

The UK had considerable experience with barrage balloons during the Second World War but the proposed use of balloons to carry warheads to a higher altitude than achievable with a tower was an innovation for Operation Antler. Use of balloons did away with the engineering effort to build towers, and allowed a test site to be re-used, saving on the effort to construct instrumentation sites and lay cables. Most importantly, whereas low-level detonations sucked up contaminated radioactive dirt from the ground and the vaporised tower, a high-altitude detonation created fallout only from the bomb itself, and were therefore much cleaner.

While accepting this point, the AWTSC was apprehensive about the consequences of a runaway balloon carrying a live atomic bomb. Bill Saxby and J. T. Tomblin from Aldermaston and an RAF balloon expert visited the Nevada Test Site to observe the work Americans were doing with balloons, and it was suggested that Titterton should also visit Nevada. Safety procedures were developed that included, in an extreme circumstance, shooting down the balloons. Titterton and Beale then accepted the use of balloons.

In July 1957, the Australian Government was informed of the UK authorities' decision to limit Operation Antler to just three tests. There would be two tower tests of 1.5 kilotons of TNT (6.3 TJ) and 3 kilotons of TNT (13 TJ), codenamed Tadje and Biak respectively, and only one balloon test, a 20-kiloton-of-TNT (84 TJ) test codenamed Taranaki. Helping the Pixie test (which became known as Tadje) remain on the schedule was the deletion of Red Beard tests. It was decided that the third test would be of a Red Beard with a composite uranium-plutonium core, which had not yet been tested, while the pure plutonium Red Beard would go into production without further testing.

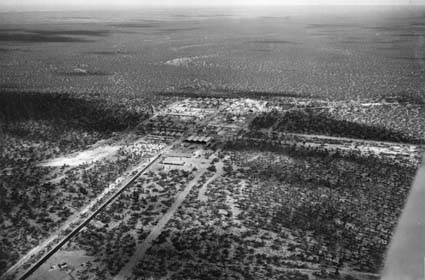
Maralinga village from the north-east

Charles Adams was appointed the test director, with J. A. T. Dawson as his deputy, and J. T. Tomblin as the superintendent. Air Commodore W. P. Sutcliffe commanded the services, with Group Captain Hugh Disney in charge of the RAF component. This was by far the largest of the three service components, with 31 aircraft and about 700 men, including a 70-man balloon detachment. Most of the aircraft were based at RAAF Base Edinburgh near Adelaide, although the Avro Shackletons were based at RAAF Base Pearce near Perth in Western Australia. There were 170 men in 22 scientific groups, including 39 Australians and 17 Canadians. Another 450 Australian and British personnel formed the Maralinga Range Support Unit (MARSU) under the command of Colonel R. Durance from the Australian Army. He was succeeded by Colonel G. D. Solomon in 1959, Colonel J. K. Lynch in 1961, Colonel W. G. Henderson in 1962, Colonel A. F. Swinburne in 1963, and Colonel J. G. Ochiltree in 1964.

Test procedures were streamlined based on the experience in Operation Buffalo so that it took six hours to set up a tower test and eight for a balloon test. This allowed the testers to take advantage of transient but suitable weather conditions. Invitations to send observers were sent out to all nations with defence cooperation agreements with Britain, which included NATO countries, and fourteen accepted. Australia would send 24 observers, along with Beale's party of 20 parliamentarians. A media contingent of 20 was also accommodated.

=== Test 1: Tadje ===
The Tadje test was scheduled for 12 September 1957, but was postponed to 13 and then 14 September due to the weather. Firing occurred at 14:35 on 14 September, in weather conditions that were almost ideal. The yield was about 1.5 kilotons of TNT (6.3 TJ) as expected. The cloud rose to 2,900 metres (9,500 ft), a little higher than predicted, and headed in a northerly direction. The Tadje test used cobalt-60 pellets as a "tracer" for determining yield. This fuelled rumours that Britain had been developing a cobalt bomb. The Range staff found the pellets scattered over the landscape. They had not been informed of its use, and their nature was discovered only by accident by Harry Turner, the Australian Health Physics Representative (AHPR). The only member of the AWTSC informed about the decision to use cobalt was Titterton, who did not inform the other members or Turner. Personnel handling these pellets were exposed to the active cobalt-60.

=== Test 2: Biak ===
The Biak test was scheduled for the following week, 21 September, but rain was forecast and the AWTSC cancelled the detonation. The meteorologists predicted a short break in the weather the following day, but with morning fog until 10:00. The fog cleared up by around 03:30. It was decided to detonate at 10:00 despite forecasts that some fallout would be deposited on the Taranaki test site. The yield was around 6 kilotons of TNT (25 TJ) as expected, but the cloud rose much higher: 7,300 metres (24,000 ft) instead of the forecast 4,300 metres (14,000 ft), with a secondary cloud forming at 4,600 metres (15,000 ft). Weather conditions were good, but as feared, fallout was deposited on the Taranaki site.

=== Test 3: Taranaki ===
While Tadje and Biak were fired from towers, Taranaki was the balloon test. A contract was let for 110,000-cubic-foot (3,100 m^{3}) balloons, but it soon became clear that they could not be produced in time, so 70,000-cubic-foot (2,000 m^{3}) balloons were substituted, of a type used by the Blue Joker project. These could bear loads of up to 4,000 kilograms (9,000 lb) in winds of up to 60 kilometres per hour (30 kn), but three were required to lift a bomb aloft instead of two. Field trials were held at RAF Cardington in Bedfordshire in February 1957. Twelve were shipped to Maralinga, however inflated balloons were not kept in hangars as they had been at Cardington, but moored in the open. On 4 September a storm struck Maralinga, with lightning and wind gusts of up to 70 kilometres per hour (40 kn), and three balloons were ignited and completely destroyed. Adams requested that another balloon and spare rigging be despatched from the UK.

Taranaki was tentatively scheduled for 7 October, but high upper-level winds caused a postponement. It was eventually decided to fire at 16:15 on 9 October. The yield was around 26.6 kilotons of TNT (111 TJ), somewhat higher than expected, but the cloud rose to 7,000 metres (23,000 ft) with a secondary cloud forming at 3,000 metres (10,000 ft), which was much lower than the 8,600 metres (28,300 ft) expected. Since the Australian Government had not set limits on fallout, the AWTSC accepted the recommendations of the NRAC. The result was that the permissible limits were double that of those set for the Operation Buffalo tests. As a result of the balloon detonation, the fireball did not touch the ground, and fallout was limited in both volume and extent. The use of balloons was thus revealed to be far more difficult than anticipated, but the anticipated advantages were realised, and balloons would subsequently be used successfully in the Operation Grapple tests on Christmas Island in the Pacific.

=== Summary ===
United Kingdom's Antler series tests and detonations
| Name | Date + time (UTC) | Local time zone | Location | Elevation + height | Delivery | Purpose | Device | Yield | References |
|---|---|---|---|---|---|---|---|---|---|
| 1/Tadje | 14 September 1957 05:05 | 14:35 ACST (9.5 hrs) | Maralinga Range, SA 29.8898°S 131.6467°E | 180 m (590 ft) + 31 m (102 ft) | Tower | Weapons development | Pixie | 930 t | |
| 2/Biak | 25 September 1957 00:30 | 10:00 ACST (9.5 hrs) | Maralinga Range, SA 29.8926°S 131.6172°E | 180 m (590 ft) + 31 m (102 ft) | Tower | Weapons development | Indigo Hammer | 6 kt | |
| 3/Taranaki | 9 October 1957 06:45 | 16:15 ACST (9.5 hrs) | Maralinga Range, SA 29.8948°S 131.5916°E | 180 m (590 ft) + 300 m (980 ft) | Balloon | Weapons development | Red Beard | 26.6 kt | |

== Minor trials ==
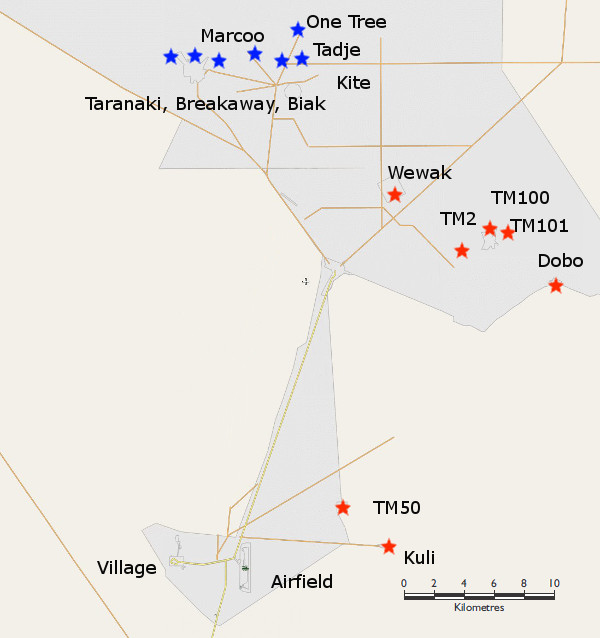
Map of the Maralinga site, with major test areas (blue) and minor trials areas (red)

In addition to the major tests, some 550 minor trials were also carried out between 1953 and 1963. These experiments were subcritical tests involving testing of nuclear weapons or their components, but not nuclear explosions. The four series of minor trials were codenamed Kittens, Tims, Rats and Vixens, and involved experiments with plutonium, uranium, polonium and beryllium. They were called "Minor Trials" until October 1958, when they were renamed "Assessment Tests" The name change were made in the wake of the international moratorium on nuclear testing, which began on 31 October 1958. It was feared that the term "minor trial" might connote that they were small nuclear explosions. The position of the British Government was that the minor trials were not covered by the moratorium, a view supported by the Americans, who continued their own program. Nonetheless, the British Government suspended all testing at Maralinga, including the minor trials. The new name lasted only until December 1959 before it was changed again to the "Maralinga Experimental Programme", as the term "test" was still considered to be too evocative of a nuclear test.

Although the major tests were carried out with publicity, the conduct of the minor trials were more secretive, especially after 1958, as the British Government wished to avoid publicity during the talks in Geneva that led to the 1963 Partial Nuclear Test Ban Treaty. The minor trials were planned and carried out by the UK authorities with little or no Australian involvement other than logistical support. The British Government submitted proposals for trials to the AWTSC, but its role was limited to advising the Australian Government whether to approve a series of tests; unlike the major tests it had no right to veto a specific minor trial. After 1960, proposals also had to be referred to Martin in his role as the Australian Defence Scientific Advisor. Radiological safety was the responsibility of the AHPR. Ultimately, the minor trials had far greater long-term environmental impact than the major tests, although these effects were limited to the range areas.

=== Kittens series ===
Nuclear weapons use a neutron initiator, a neutron source capable of producing a burst of neutrons in order to "kick-start" the nuclear chain reaction at the optimal moment. These worked by mixing polonium-210 and beryllium. Polonium-210 is an alpha particle emitter with a half-life of 138 days. Alpha particles from the polonium caused the beryllium to emit neutrons. The Kitten trials were experiments conducted as part of the development of the neutron initiators.

Five tests were conducted at the K site at Emu Field, about 13 kilometres (8 mi) from the Operation Totem test site on 26 and 30 September and 6, 14 and 17 October 1953. These experiments dispersed about 36 grams (1.3 oz) of beryllium and 407 curies (15,100 GBq) of polonium-210 into the surrounding area. Most of the contamination was within a 12-metre (40 ft) radius, with some debris being thrown up to 370 metres (400 yd) away. All contamination was within the restricted area.

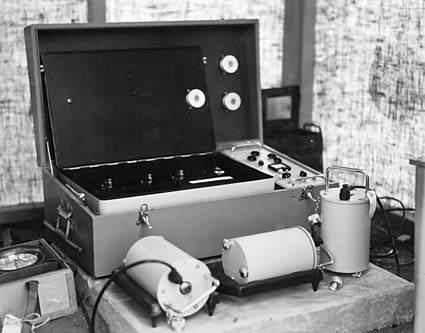
Kittens and Tim Operation – 43 Mile Camp – Instrumentation

From these tests an improved initiator design emerged that was smaller and simpler, which the scientists were eager to test. A site in the UK would save time and money, although Omond Solandt raised the possibility of using one in Alberta in Canada. Consideration was given to using the range on Foulness Island, which was used by the AWRE for testing conventional explosive components of nuclear weapons, but on 7 April 1954 the Lord President of the Council, Marquess of Salisbury informed the House of Lords that at Foulness, "no nuclear explosions have been or will be made, nor will experiments be made with fission products or any other hazardous radioactive material." While no experiments were carried out at Foulness with radioactive material, experiments were conducted with explosives and beryllium in 1962 and 1963.

An alternative considered was Wick in Scotland. Contamination there could be blown out to sea, but the site was otherwise far from ideal. The weather there was generally wet, and the high humidity would interfere with experimental apparatus. Moreover, although downwind contamination would be acceptable, the local authorities could not be reassured that it would be zero. Lieutenant Colonel K. Stewart noted that "I doubt if the people owning the estates in Scotland would look on that with very great favour. They are interested in pheasants and deer in Scotland." The dry weather and isolation of Maralinga provided a better option.

The December 1952 aide-mémoire covering Operation Totem made no mention of minor trials, and they came to the notice of Australian authorities only when Australian assistance was requested in preparing the site, but Australian concurrence was sought for all subsequent trials. The Wilson mission requested that in addition to conducting major atomic tests, the UK could conduct a series of Kitten trials as part of Operation Buffalo. The Australians asked for details, and in response Aldermaston provided a comprehensive report on The Scope and Radiological Hazards of Kittens in February 1955. This was referred to Martin for comment. He could see no issues with the proposed tests, and they were approved by the AWTSC. A Kitten test site was established at Naya, east of the main Maralinga range. A public announcement of the Kitten trials was issued in the UK on 25 February 1955 and in Australia the following day.

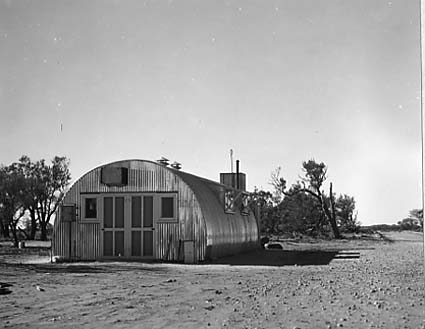
Kittens and Tim Operation – 43 Mile Camp – Trials area

Six Kitten tests were carried out at Naya in March 1956. Thereafter, they became a regular part of the testing program, with 21 more tests carried out in 1957, 20 in 1959, and 47 in 1960 and 1961, after which they were discontinued owing to the development of external neutron generators. Kitten experiments at Naya dispersed 7,004 curies (259,100 GBq) of polonium-210, 750 grams (26 oz) of beryllium and 120 kilograms (260 lb) of natural and depleted uranium.

=== Tim series ===
Tim experiments were concerned with the measurement of how the core of a nuclear weapon was compressed by the shock wave of the high explosive component. The passage of the shock wave through the assembly was measured and recorded using detectors and high-speed photography. Tim tests used real nuclear weapon assemblies, but cores of natural or depleted uranium, which is chemically identical to highly enriched uranium but not fissile, and only feebly radioactive. They took place from 1955 to 1963, and involved 321 trials with uranium and beryllium tampers at the Naya and Kuli areas at Maralinga. Twelve of the Tim tests at the TM100 and TM101 areas involved studies of plutonium compression. These experiments used and dispersed 77 kilograms (170 lb) of beryllium, 825 kilograms (1,819 lb) of natural uranium, 6,800 kilograms (15,000 lb) of uranium-238 and about 1.2 kg of plutonium about the test sites.

=== Rat series ===
Rat trials also investigated the properties of shock waves. They had the same objectives as the Tims, and differed only in the way that measurements were carried out. Instead of using external sensors, the Rats employed an intense but short-lived gamma ray source the size of a pea that was placed inside the assembly. X-ray detectors gave a picture of the progress of the explosion from the inside. Between 1956 and 1960, 125 Rat trials took place at the Naya and Dobo areas at Maralinga. The Rat tests used 180 kilograms (400 lb) of uranium-238; 2,160 curies (80,000 GBq) of scandium-46, a beta and gamma emitter with a radioactive half-life of 83.8 days; 400 curies (15,000 GBq) of polonium-210, with a half-life of 138 days; and 120 curies (4,400 GBq) of lead-212, a beta emitter with a half-life of 10.6 hours. With such short lifetimes, these soon decayed away to negligible amounts.

=== Vixen series ===
Vixen trials involved safety testing. They were about assuring that the core of a nuclear weapon would not accidentally undergo criticality in the event of a fire or unintended crash. These were messy, for a successful test subjected the core to high explosives in the hope that it simply scatters rather than undergoes criticality. These tests sometimes involved some yield from fission, but in every case this was less than the yield from the weapon's conventional explosive component. The British Government's position was that so long as the nuclear explosion component was less than 10 tonnes of TNT (42 GJ) there was no violation of the Partial Nuclear Test Ban Treaty, which was then under discussion, but no such limit was agreed upon. While the AWTSC could determine whether there were public health and safety issues with a test, it could not assess whether there were political issues. However, after some consideration, the Australian Government did approve the proposed Vixen test program.

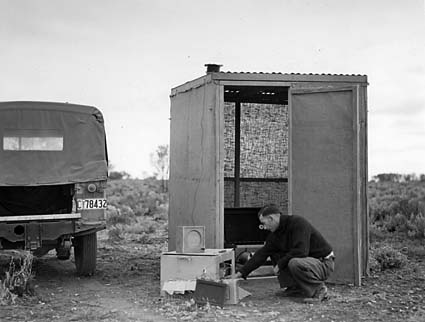
Kittens and Tim Operation – 43 Mile Camp – Trials area – setting up instrumentation

Some 31 Vixen A trials were conducted in the Wewak area at Maralinga between 1959 and 1961 that investigated the effects of an accidental fire on a nuclear weapon, and involved a total of about 68 kilograms (150 lb) of natural and depleted uranium, 0.98 kg of plutonium of which 0.58 kg was dispersed, 99 curies (3,700 GBq) of polonium-210 and 1.96 curies (73 GBq) of actinium-227. Balloons were used to carry instruments aloft and take samples. There were three types of Vixen A experiments: combustion in a petrol fire; combustion in an electric furnace; and dispersion by detonation of a nuclear bomb's high explosive components. The petrol fire tests were conducted using a chimney 3.4-metre (11 ft) tall on a 1.2-by-1.2-metre (4 by 4 ft) base, and generated temperatures ranging from 800 to 1,200 °C (1,470 to 2,190 °F) for uranium and beryllium and 600 to 1,000 °C (1,112 to 1,832 °F) for plutonium. The electric furnace tests were only used for tests with uranium, and involved temperatures ranging from 600 to 800 °C (1,112 to 1,472 °F).

The Vixen B experimental tests used explosives to blow up nuclear warheads containing plutonium to simulate what would happen in an air crash. In total, twelve Vixen B were conducted at the Taranaki site in 1960, 1961 and 1963, resulting in it becoming the most contaminated site at Maralinga. The tests were conducted on steel structures known as feather beds. The tests produced "jets of molten, burning plutonium extending hundreds of feet into the air." The damage to the feather beds and their concrete stands was much greater than anticipated, and a new feather bed was used for each round. At the conclusion of each, all the debris was buried in nearby pits. Eventually there were 21 pits containing 830 tonnes (820 long tons) of material contaminated with 20 kg of plutonium. Another 2 kg of plutonium was scattered about the test site.

Plutonium is not particularly dangerous externally as it emits alpha particles which are stopped by 9 cm (3.5 in) of air, or the dead layer of skin cells on the body, and is not a very intensive source of radiation, due to its long half-life of 24,000 years. It is dangerous when it enters the body, in the worst case by breathing and lodging in the lungs, and therefore tiny particles, often the result of such explosion testing, are the worst threat. The extreme biological persistence of plutonium's radioactive contamination and the cancer threat posed by alpha radiation occurring internally together establish plutonium's dangers.

During the Operation Antler trials, the British Government had given the AWTSC reassurances that safety measures were in place to prevent balloons from breaking loose. Despite this, two balloons broke free during a squall on 22 July 1959. One was subsequently recovered but the other was not. A board of inquiry was held, but an even more embarrassing incident occurred on the night of 23/24 September 1960, when seven of the eight balloons being readied for experiments broke free of their moorings during a thunderstorm. Five were recovered on the range on 27 September, but two were lost and drifted further afield, one being recovered near Cobar in New South Wales on 24 September and the other around Hungerford in New South Wales, which was not located until 1 October. Titterton wrote a critical letter to the AWRE. It was clear that the procedures to prevent balloon escapes had been inadequate and the self-destruction devices were unreliable.

=== Fallout ===
In the late 1950s, Hedley Marston's research into nuclear fallout from the Maralinga nuclear tests brought Marston into bitter conflict with the AWTSC, resulting in one of the more memorable feuds in Australian science. Marston was the head of the Division of Biology and General Nutrition at the CSIRO, and was commissioned by the AWTSC to study the concentrations of iodine-131 in the thyroids of sheep and cattle. A 1954 American report assessed that there was no public health danger, but the AWTSC wanted to be able to monitor the Australian situation. Surveys started before the tests at Maralinga commenced in order to establish a baseline. Marston's results indicated a rise in iodine-131 due to Operation Mosaic. It was not enough to pose a public health hazard—his results indicated that the concentration was about 1 per cent of the acceptable limit—but it did indicate that fallout was more widespread than first thought. He then attempted to extrapolate his results to strontium-90, but a valid assessment could not be made in this way, and was therefore no more than speculation. In 1961 the AWTSC published a study where the bones of deceased people (especially children) were burnt to ash and then measured for strontium-90. It did find an increase in strontium-90 in Australia, but it was a quarter of that recorded in the UK. Although fallout from the 1958 Operation Grapple thermonuclear tests was detectable in the UK, none was detected in Australia.

== Closure ==
Maralinga was conceived as a testing ground where major tests could be conducted annually, but this did not occur, and Operation Antler was the last major test series conducted there. One reason was public sentiment. A 1952 poll indicated that 58 per cent of Australians supported British nuclear testing in Australia, with only 29 per cent against, but support steadily declined, and by 1957 only 37 per cent were in favour, with 49 per cent opposed. This augured poorly for the future of Maralinga should there be a change of government, and the 1961 Australian federal election reduced Menzies' majority to just one seat. The decline in Australian support for testing was part of a worldwide trend that resulted in the moratorium on nuclear testing from November 1958 to September 1961.

Maralinga was now redundant, as the Australian Government's restriction on testing thermonuclear weapons had led to the development of the Christmas Island test site, where there was no such restriction, and its favourable winds carried fallout away. With the 1958 US–UK Mutual Defence Agreement, Britain also gained access to the Nevada Test Site, where the first British major test took place underground on 1 March 1962, but there was no certainty that Nevada would be available in the future. The 1963 Partial Nuclear Test Ban Treaty banned atmospheric testing, and no site was located at the Maralinga Range for underground testing; the nearest suitable site was on Aboriginal land 400 kilometres (250 mi) away.

After 1963, Maralinga was placed on caretaker status; and although there was some discussion about conducting minor trials in 1966 – for the 1956 Memorandum of Arrangements was due to expire in March of that year – the British Government decided that it would not seek to extend or renew the agreement. A formal memorandum on the termination of the 1956 Memorandum of Arrangements was signed on 23 September 1967, and the UK was released from most liabilities and responsibilities on 21 December 1967. In December 1968, the Minister for Defence revoked the declaration of Maralinga as a prohibited area under the Defence (Special Undertakings) Act 1952. On 31 August 1972, the Minister for Supply removed the restrictions on most of the Maralinga Prohibited Area, retaining only a 48-by-240-kilometre (30 by 149 mi) strip that became part of the new Woomera Prohibited Area.

== Legacy ==
=== 1963–64 cleanup ===
Cleanup operations commenced at Maralinga with Operation Clean Up in 1963 and Operation Hercules in 1964. These involved the removal of major hazards to permit entry to the test sites. A major cleanup operation codenamed Operation Brumby was conducted in 1967. Attempts were made to dilute the concentration of radioactive material by turning over and mixing the surface soil. Highly contaminated soil from Wewak was buried in the Marcoo crater, and the debris pits were capped. Over time, the short-lived isotopes decayed away, leaving plutonium, with its half-life of 24,100 years, as the main radioactive hazard. In January 1979, the British Government agreed to the "repatriation" of recoverable plutonium that had been buried at Maralinga.

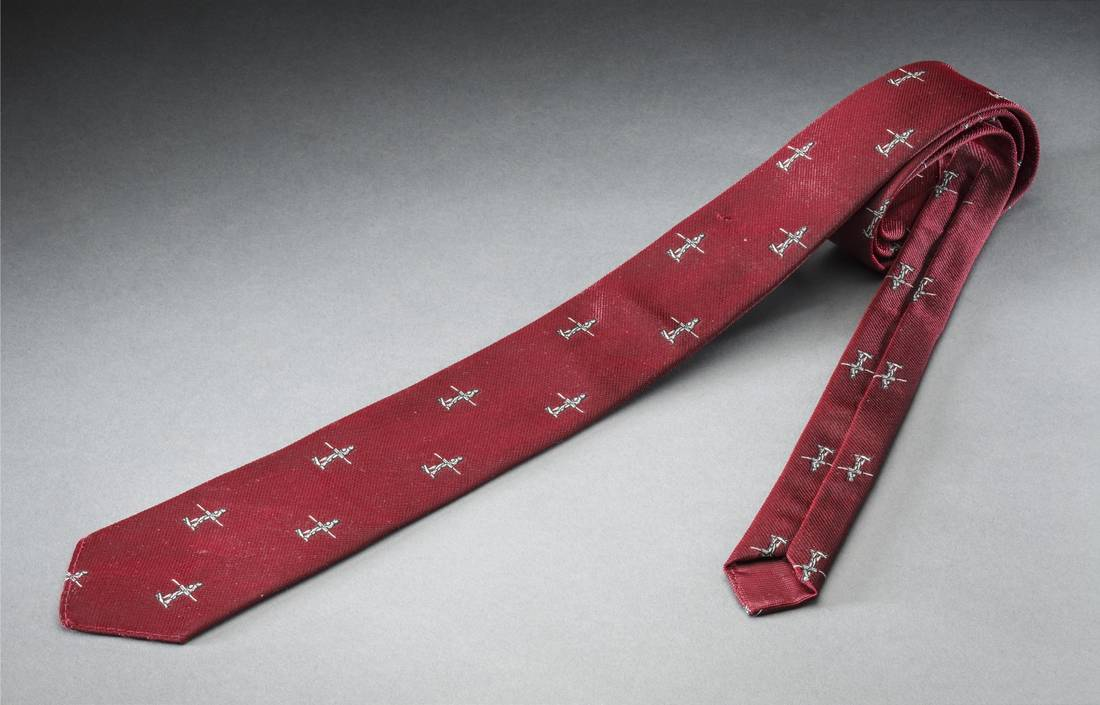
Souvenir necktie for staff of Maralinga

=== 1984 committee ===
In 1984, the Minister for Resources and Energy established the Kerr Committee on 15 May 1984 to review fallout from the British nuclear tests in Australia. After receiving the report, and having discussions with John Symonds, who was commissioned to write an official history of the British nuclear tests, he decided to convene a royal commission into them. The McClelland Royal Commission delivered its report in late 1985, and found that significant radiation hazards still existed at many of the Maralinga test sites, particularly at Taranaki. The Australian Government accepted the findings of the royal commission, but rejected its recommendations that a Maralinga Commission be created, on the grounds that this was more properly a role for a department of state rather a statutory body, and that the British Government should pay all the costs of a cleanup. Instead, Cabinet decided that the British Government should be asked to make a significant contribution. Australian claims were put to the British Government in 1991, and in June 1993, it agreed to contribute an ex gratia sum of UK £20 million towards the costs of rehabilitation of the site.

=== 2000 cleanup ===
A Technical Assessment Group (TAG) was set up to advise on rehabilitation options, and a much more extensive clean-up program was initiated. The TAG Report plan was approved in 1991. Work commenced on site in 1996, and was completed in 2000 at a cost of $108 million. In the worst-contaminated areas, 350,000 cubic metres (12,000,000 cu ft) of soil and debris were removed from an area of more than 2 square kilometres (0.77 sq mi), and buried in trenches. Eleven debris pits were also treated with in situ vitrification. Most of the site (approximately 3,200 square kilometres (1,200 sq mi) was rendered now safe for unrestricted access and approximately 120 square kilometres (46 sq mi) is considered safe for access but not "permanent occupancy". "A term", British historian Lorna Arnold noted, "that no one would have applied to these regions 30 or 40 years before". Nuclear engineer Alan Parkinson observed that "an Aboriginal living a semi-traditional lifestyle would receive an effective dose of 5 mSv/a (five times that allowed for a member of the public). Within the 120 km^{2}, the effective dose would be up to 13 times greater." The effectiveness of the cleanup has been disputed on a number of occasions.

=== Effects on people ===
One author suggests that the resettlement of Aboriginal people and denial of access to their traditional lands "contributed significantly to the social disintegration which characterises the community to this day. Petrol sniffing, juvenile crime, alcoholism and chronic friction between residents and the South Australian police have become facts of life." In 1994, the Australian Government reached a compensation settlement with the traditional owners, Maralinga Tjarutja, which resulted in the payment of $13.5 million in settlement of all claims in relation to the nuclear testing. Most of the land was handed back in 2009; full handover was marked with a ceremony on 5 November 2014.

A Department of Veterans' Affairs study concluded that "the doses received by Australian participants were small. ... Only 2% of participants received more than the current Australian annual dose limit for occupationally exposed persons (20 mSv)." However, such findings are contested. Australian servicemen were ordered to: repeatedly fly through the mushroom clouds from atomic explosions, without protection; and to march into ground zero immediately after bomb detonation. Airborne drifts of radioactive material resulted in "radioactive rain" being dropped on Brisbane and Queensland country areas. A 1999 study for the British Nuclear Test Veterans Association found that 30 per cent of involved veterans had died, mostly in their fifties, from cancers. Veterans also claim that their children have been born with disabilities, disfigurements and genetic defects as a result of the tests.

In 2001, Sue Rabbit Roff, a researcher from the University of Dundee, uncovered documentary evidence that troops had been ordered to run, walk and crawl across areas contaminated by the Buffalo tests in the days immediately following the detonations; a fact that the British Government later admitted. Roff stated that "it puts the lie to the British Government's claim that they never used humans for guinea pig-type experiments in nuclear weapons trials in Australia."

Successive Australian Governments failed to compensate servicemen who contracted cancers following exposure to radiation at Maralinga. However, after a British decision in 1988 to compensate its own servicemen, the Australian Government negotiated compensation for several Australian servicemen with two specific conditions, leukaemia (except lymphatic leukemia) and the rare blood disorder multiple myeloma.

=== Ongoing contamination ===
It was found in 2021 that radioactive ("hot") particles persist in the soil, after international multidisciplinary team of scientists studied the results produced by a machine at Monash University that could slice open tiny samples using a beam of high-energy ions only a nanometre wide. The analysis of the results suggested that natural processes in the desert environment could bring about the slow release of plutonium over a long period. This plutonium is likely to be absorbed by wildlife at Maralinga.

Additionally, radionuclides from the nuclear weapons tests have been detected as far away as Madagascar, where elevated levels of plutonium-240 and plutonium-239 have been found in marshlands and are believed to originate from both British nuclear tests in Australia as well as French nuclear tests in French Polynesia.

== Media coverage ==
According to Liz Tynan from James Cook University, the Maralinga tests were a striking example of what can happen when the popular media are unable to report on activities that a government may be trying to hide. Maralinga was an example of extreme secrecy, but by the late 1970s there was a marked change in how the Australian media covered the British nuclear tests. Some resourceful investigative journalists emerged, whistle-blowers such as Avon Hudson spoke out and political scrutiny became more intense. The investigative journalist Brian Toohey ran a series of stories in the Australian Financial Review in October 1978, based in part on a leaked Cabinet submission.

In June 1993, New Scientist journalist Ian Anderson wrote an article entitled "Britain's dirty deeds at Maralinga" and several related articles. They are a detailed analysis of the legacy of Vixen B and the Australian Government's prolonged negotiations with the United Kingdom on cleaning up Maralinga and sharing the cost of "safe-sealing" waste plutonium. In 1993, Anderson won two Michael Daley Awards for his Maralinga articles.

Maralinga: Australia's Nuclear Waste Cover-up is a book by Alan Parkinson that was published in 2007. In it he claimed that the clean-up of Maralinga in the late 1990s was compromised by cost-cutting, and simply involved dumping hazardous radioactive debris in shallow holes in the ground. He stated that "what was done at Maralinga was a cheap and nasty solution that wouldn't be adopted on white-fellas land."

== Representations in the arts ==
=== Art ===
- In 1987 Winnie Bamara, who lived near Maralinga, produced a painting for a poster protesting nuclear testing at Maralinga, for the Australian Council for Disarmament and Peace for Maralinga Day, 1987 which was produced by Common Ground Magazine with the support of the people of the Maralinga–Tjarutja community. Her image shows a nuclear bomb exploding on the Maralinga lands as three Indigenous people stand watching, with text that briefly discusses the history of the British Government testing of nuclear bombs at Maralinga.
- Betty Muffler, ngangkari and artist who works at Iwantja Arts who was born at Emu Field, was about nine years old when the first bomb was detonated, and she lost several family members. Seeing the deaths and dislocation caused by the tests has inspired much of her artwork, and she has expressed healing as a recurrent theme in her work. She won "Best emerging artist" at the 2017 National Aboriginal and Torres Strait Islander Art Awards in 2017 with one of her iterations of Ngangkaṟi Ngura (Healing Country). Another work of the same title, specially commissioned for the September 2020 issue of Vogue, featured in the Know My Name exhibition at the National Gallery of Australia.
- Kokatha and Nukunu artist Yhonnie Scarce has created at least two major works representing the nuclear tests and the effects on her people. The work Thunder Raining Poison (2015) was created from more than 2,000 hand-blown glass yams, and references the impact of the nuclear tests on local Aboriginal communities. In 2020 she completed a work called Cloud Chamber, comprising series of 1,000 glass yams hung from the ceiling in the shape of a mushroom cloud.

=== Drama ===
- Ground Zero (1987) is an Australian drama-thriller about a cinematographer (played by Colin Friels) who, prompted by curiosity about some old film footage taken by his father, embarks on a quest to uncover the truth about the tests. It also stars actors Jack Thompson and Indigenous activist Burnum Burnum.
- The Career Highlights of the Mamu is an Australian play by Trevor Jamieson and Scott Rankin, performed at the Adelaide Festival in February–March 2002. The play tells the story of the Tjuntjuntjara Aboriginal people, who lived in the desert country of South Australia and Western Australia, and their experience with British nuclear testing at Maralinga and Emu Field. Tribal elders describe being moved out of the area, and the death and illness of their people when they attempted to return to their contaminated homelands.
- Maralinga: The Anangu Story (2009), by the Yalata & Oak Valley Communities with Christobel Mattingley, is an information book about the history and culture of the region, the controversy, and its original owners. Aimed at young people, the book was awarded a silver Honour medal in 2010 by the Children's Book Council of Australia. Judy Nunn used the events at Maralinga as a backdrop for her novel Maralinga (2009).
- Operation Buffalo, a May 2020 Australian television drama series screen on ABC, is inspired by the events of British nuclear tests at Maralinga. The story does not stick to factual events, but mixes satire, farce, nostalgia and drama, at the same time representing aspects of historical fact, the tensions between the British and Australian governments and a serious depiction of the treatment of the Aboriginal people in the area.
- Maralinga Tjarutja, a May 2020 television documentary film directed by Larissa Behrendt and made by Blackfella Films for ABC Television, tells the story of the people of Maralinga. It was deliberately broadcast around the same time that the drama series Operation Buffalo was on, to give voice to the Indigenous people of the area and show how the testing disrupted their lives. Screenhub Australia gave it 4.5 stars, calling it an "excellent documentary". The film shows the experiences of the Maralinga Tjarutja people, in which the elders "reveal a perspective of deep time and an understanding of place that generates respect for the sacredness of both", their ancestors having lived in the area for millennia. Despite the disregard for the traditional homelands of the Maralinga Tjarutja shown by the British and Australians involved in the testing, they have continued to fight for their rights to look after the now-contaminated land.

=== Music ===
- The Australian rock band Midnight Oil recorded a song about the tests called "Maralinga" on their 1982 LP 10, 9, 8, 7, 6, 5, 4, 3, 2, 1.
- Paul Kelly's "Maralinga (Rainy Land)" is about the effects of British nuclear tests on the Maralinga Tjarutja.
- "After Maralinga" by the British band Latin Quarter is about the aftermath of the nuclear tests.
- Australian singer/songwriter Kelly Chase released the song "Children of the Dust" in 2021, music from the History Detective Podcast, Season 1, Episode 4 "Nuclear Testing at Maralinga."
- "Birthright" from the 1989 album Anderson Bruford Wakeman Howe is about the tests. The liner notes for it state "In 1954 the British Government, in order to maintain the balance of power between East and West, exploded their first atom bomb at Woomera. They failed to contact all of the Aborigine peoples at the time. The Aborigines still call this 'the day of the cloud.'"
