= Owen Magee =

Australian army officer (1925–2007)

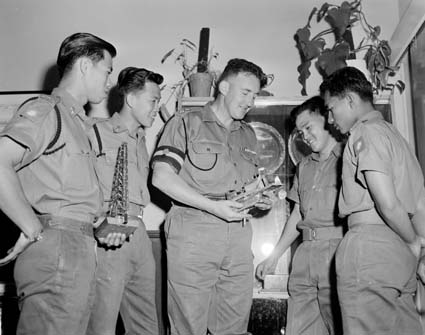
- Magee (centre) shows presentation pieces to the Malaysian officers in 1963
- Born: 26 March 1925; Wickepin, Western Australia
- Died: 14 May 2007 (aged 82)
- Military career
- Allegiance: Australia
- Branch: Australian Army
- Service years: 1944–1970
- Rank: Brigadier
- Service number: 589 (WX41897)
- Unit: Royal Australian Engineers
- Conflicts: Second World War; Korean War; Vietnam War
- Other work: Director of the Sydney Cove Redevelopment Authority

Brigadier Denis Owen Anthony Magee (26 March 1925 – 14 May 2007) was a brigadier in the Australian Army. A graduate of the Royal Military College, Duntroon, and the University of Western Australia, he served in the Second World War, Korean War and Vietnam War. He was involved in the construction of the rocket range at Woomera, the British nuclear weapon tests site at Maralinga, the Snowy Mountains Scheme, the Lavarack Barracks and the Oakey Army Aviation Centre. After retiring from the army in 1970, he served as Director of the Sydney Cove Redevelopment Authority until 1985.

== Early life ==
Denis Owen Anthony Magee was born in Wickepin, Western Australia, on 25 March 1925. His father, John, won the Distinguished Conduct Medal in World War I. Magee was educated at Aquinas College, Perth, and entered the Royal Military College, Duntroon, in 1943. He played Australian football on the college team.

== Military career ==
Owing to the ongoing Second World War, Magee's class was commissioned early; he graduated from Duntroon 17th in the class of 1945, and was commissioned as a temporary lieutenant in the Australian Staff Corps and the Second Australian Imperial Force (AIF) on 13 December 1944. with the AIF service number WX41897. His rank became substantive on 30 June 1945. He was initially assigned to the School of Military Engineering until 9 May 1945, and then was a platoon commander at the Jungle Warfare Centre at Canungra, Queensland. Magee was posted to the 6th Division, and went to New Guinea on 26 August 1945, soon after the war ended. He served for brief periods of time with the 8th Field Company, 2/2nd Field Company, 6th Army Troops Company and 4th Field Company.

In March 1946, the Army sent Magee to the University of Western Australia to complete his Bachelor of Engineering degree in civil engineering. He was promoted to the rank of captain on 13 December 1948, graduated in 1949, and was posted to Western Command. He was transferred to the 1st Field Squadron on 14 January 1950, and the 7th Field Squadron on 1 December. In March 1950 he completed the Junior Officers' Course. On 29 June 1951, Magee departed Sydney bound for Iwakuni, Japan, where he joined the British Commonwealth Occupation Force (BCOF) Engineer Regiment. On 5 July 1952, during the Korean War, he assumed command of the Royal Australian Engineers detachment in Korea. On 15 November 1952, he became Deputy Commander, Royal Engineers (DCRE).

Returning to Australia in January 1952, Magee became CRE Western Command in January 1953, with the temporary rank of major from 7 February. He married Beverly Joan Prior in St Mary's Cathedral, Perth, on 27 June 1953. They had two children, Thomas Anthony John and Jeremy Owen. He completed the Field Officers' Tactics Course in June and July 1954.

In July 1955, he was attached to the Department of Supply, and was engaged in the construction of rocket launching facility at Woomera. On 15 January 1956, Magee appoint the chief engineer for Operation Buffalo, the British nuclear tests at Maralinga in 1956. While there he was injured during a cricket match. In 1957 and 1958 he was seconded to the Snowy Mountains Authority, and helped build its underground hydroelectric power stations. He wrote about his experiences in a technical paper on the "Behaviour of Decomposed Granites as Pavement Materials", which he presented at a conference on soil mechanics in Sydney in 1960. He was posted to the staff of the Chief Engineer (CE) Southern Command and became CE Western Command on 18 January 1959.

Magee attended the Field Officers' Tactics Refresher Course in March 1959, and the Senior Officers Tactics School in August and September. From January to December 1960, the Pakistan Command and Staff College in Quetta, where he was placed in the awkward position of having to defend the Australian government's White Australia Policy. He was appointed Commandant of the School of Military Engineering on 18 January 1961, with the temporary rank of lieutenant colonel, which became substantive on 20 December 1962. He then became Chief Engineer at Northern Command, based in Brisbane on 24 March 1965. In this role he oversaw the redevelopment of Enoggera Barracks in Brisbane, and the construction of Lavarack Barracks in Townsville and the Army Aviation Centre in Oakey.

Promoted to temporary rank colonel on 11 November 1968, and the permanent rank on 8 February 1969, Magee's last military appointment was as the Director of Fortifications and Works in Canberra. In this capacity he paid two visits to the Australian forces fighting in South Vietnam in the Vietnam War, looking at construction work at the Australian base at Nui Dat.

On 13 January 1970, Magee retired from the Regular Army. He became a reservist on 18 October 1970, retaining his rank of colonel, and was appointed Chief Engineer 11 (Works). He was promoted to the temporary rank of brigadier 1 December 1973, and the substantive rank on 31 August 1974. He retired from the Army on 31 August 1978.

== Sydney Cove Redevelopment Authority ==
After retiring from the Regular Army in 1970 Magee accepted the position of Executive Director of the Sydney Cove Redevelopment Authority. As such, he was in charge of a $300 million redevelopment program at The Rocks, a 14-hectare (35-acre) slum district of historical value that was the home of many low-rent tenants. In what became known as the Battle of the Rocks, he was opposed by local residents and the powerful Builders Labourers Federation (BLP) led by Jack Mundey and Bob Pringle, who imposed green bans on the site until the BLF was deregistered in 1974. In the end, many historic buildings were saved, but the nature of the area was completely changed, and it was transformed into an up-market tourist attraction. In 1970, about 25,000 people visited The Rocks each year; forty years later, it attracted 9 million visitors per annum.

Magee had memorials erected honouring people that had played a significant part in the history of Sydney Cove, such as George Barney, William Bligh, Robert Campbell and Lucy Osburn, but opposed plans to build a monument to Jack Munday. Magee resigned in 1985 over a conflict with Bob Carr concerning the redevelopment of Globe Street and the Clocktower in The Rocks. In retirement he did volunteer charity work, and served as Honorary Colonel Commandant of the Royal Australian Engineers. He remained active in debates on matters such as the proposed privatisation of the Snowy Mountains Authority, the Very Fast Train between Sydney and Melbourne, which he felt would be uneconomical, and the design of the Museum of Contemporary Art. He wrote a book on the Battle of the Rocks, titled, How The Rocks Was Won.

Magee died on 14 May 2007. He was survived by his wife Beverly and sons Tom and Jeremy.

== Decorations ==
Magee's decorations include the Pacific Star, War Medal 1939–1945, Australia Service Medal 1939–1945, Korea Medal, United Nations Service Medal, Vietnam Logistic and Support Medal, Australian Service Medal 1945–1975 and National Medal.
