= Maralinga: Australia's Nuclear Waste Cover-up =

Book by Alan Parkinson

- Book cover
- Author: Alan Parkinson
- Language: en
- Subject: British atomic bomb test site at Maralinga
- Publisher: ABC Books
- Publication date: 2007
- Pages: 233 pp.
- ISBN: 978-0-7333-2108-5
- OCLC: 174040769

Maralinga: Australia's Nuclear Waste Cover-up is a book by Alan Parkinson about the clean-up of the British atomic bomb test site at Maralinga in South Australia, published in 2007.

== Overview ==
Parkinson, a nuclear engineer and former Government Representative to oversee the Maralinga Rehabilitation Project, explains that the clean-up of Maralinga in the late 1990s was compromised by cost-cutting and simply involved dumping hazardous radioactive debris in shallow holes in the ground. Parkinson states that "What was done at Maralinga was a cheap and nasty solution that wouldn't be adopted on white-fellas land."

== Reviews ==
- Australian Book Review
- Medicine, Conflict and Survival

== See also ==
- Britain, Australia and the Bomb
- Downwinders
- List of books about nuclear issues
- Maralinga
- McClelland Royal Commission
- Montebello Islands
- Silent Storm (film)
