= Alan Parkinson (engineer) =

Australian nuclear engineer

Alan Parkinson is a mechanical and nuclear engineer who lives in Canberra, Australia. He is also a whistleblower who wrote the 2007 book, Maralinga: Australia’s Nuclear Waste Cover-up which exposed deficiencies in the clean-up of the British atomic bomb test site at Maralinga in South Australia.

== Maralinga clean-up ==
In 1993, Parkinson became the key person on the Maralinga clean-up project, representing the then federal Labor government (through the Department of Primary Industry and Energy). By 1997, however, there was much cost-cutting involved in the project, and differences of opinion about how the project should proceed, which led to the sacking of Parkinson by the new Howard government.

The clean-up, which involved simply burying untreated long-lived radioactive debris in holes in the ground, was totally unsatisfactory according to Parkinson. He exposed the situation through the Australian Broadcasting Corporation, provoking a strong rebuttal from the government, composed of scientific distortion and personal abuse.

The plan was to collect some of the contaminated soil and bury that soil in a specially prepared trench 15 metres deep. Several thousand tonnes of debris contaminated with plutonium was to be treated by a process of in situ vitrification. After collection and burial of the soil, the project moved to the second phase - the treatment of 21 pits by vitrification. Against the advice of Parkinson, the government department extended the contract of the project manager, even though that company had no knowledge of the complex process of vitrification. At that stage Parkinson was removed from the project. The government and the project manager then embarked on a hybrid scheme in which some pits would be exhumed and others treated by vitrification. After successfully treating 12 pits, there was an unlucky thirteenth during which something in the pit exploded and severely damaged the equipment. The government then cancelled the vitrification and simply exhumed the remaining pits, placed the debris in a shallow pit and covered it with clean soil.

== See also ==
- Anti-nuclear movement in Australia
- List of nuclear whistleblowers
- Avon Hudson
