= Schinkel (surname) =

Schinkel is a German and Dutch surname, a variant of Schenkel. Notable people with the surname include:

- Karl Friedrich Schinkel (1781–1841), early 19th-century German architect
- Ken Schinkel (1932–2020), Canadian ice hockey player and coach

== See also ==
- Frank Schinkels (born 1963), Dutch footballer
