= Schenkel =

Schenkel is a surname of Dutch, German, and Ashkenazi origin. The word means shank or thigh indicating at the occupation of butcher or used as a surname for a person with notable legs. Notable people with the surname include:

- Alexia Arisarah Schenkel (born 1996), Swiss-Thai alpine skier
- Andrea Maria Schenkel (born 1962), German writer
- Cal Schenkel (born 1947), American artist
- Carl Schenkel (born 1948), Swiss film director
- Chris Schenkel (1923–2005), American sportscaster
- Daniel Schenkel (1813–1885), Swiss Protestant theologian
- Danny Schenkel (born 1978), Dutch footballer
- Eli Schenkel (born 1992), Canadian Olympic fencer
- Gary W. Schenkel, US Department of Homeland Security official
- Gerd Schenkel (born 1969), German-Australian businessperson
- Lukas Schenkel (born 1984), Swiss footballer
- Martin Schenkel (1968–2003), Swiss actor and musician
- Reto Schenkel (born 1988), Swiss sprinter
- Scott Schenkel, American business executive, CEO of eBay

== See also ==
- Schenkel (Rotterdam Metro), Dutch subway station
