= John G. Shinkle =

United States Army general

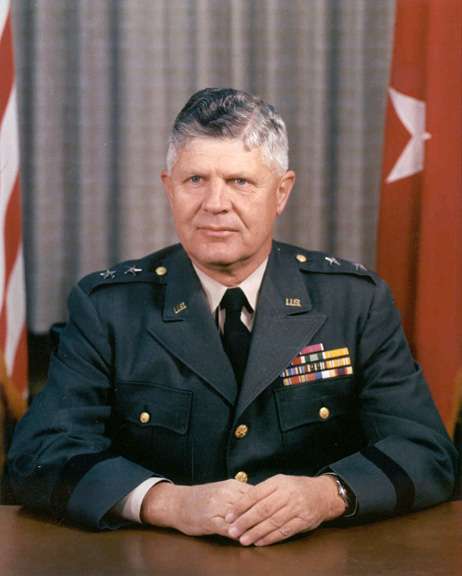
- Born: 10 March 1912; Boston, Massachusetts, US
- Died: 10 January 1995 (aged 82); Phoenix, Arizona, US
- Burial place: West Point Cemetery
- Military career
- Allegiance: United States
- Branch: United States Army
- Service years: 1927–1963
- Rank: Major General
- Service number: 0-18979
- Commands: White Sands Missile Range; Army Rocket and Guided Missile Agency
- Conflicts: World War II
- Awards: Army Distinguished Service Medal; Legion of Merit; Bronze Star Medal; Commendation Ribbon; Order of the Cloud and Banner (China); Military Order (China)

John Gardner Shinkle (10 March 1912 – 10 January 1995) was a United States Army general who became the first commander of the Army Rocket and Guided Missile Agency and the sixth commander of the White Sands Missile Range.

== Early life ==
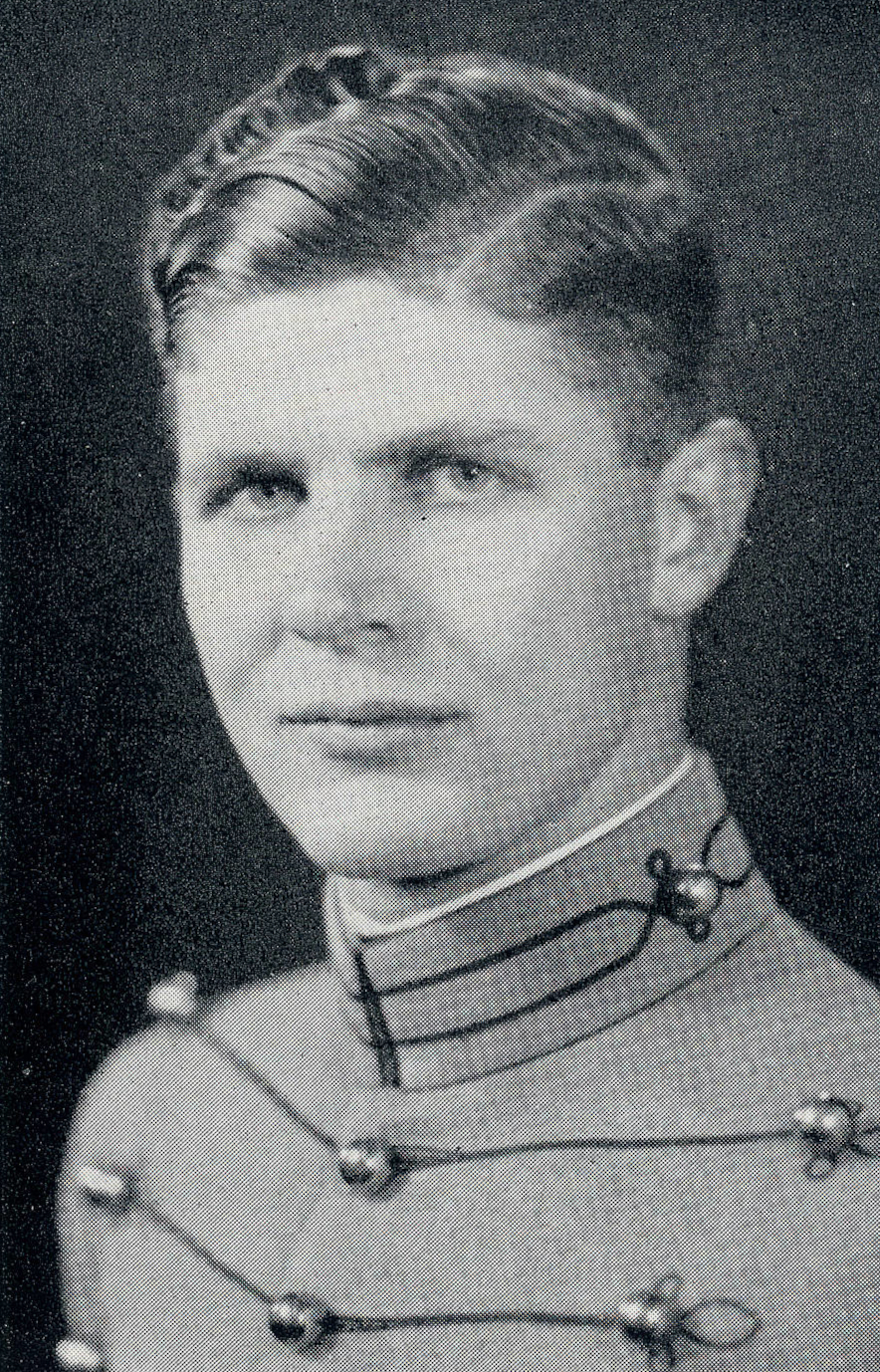
As a West Point Cadet c. 1933

John Gardner Shinkle was born in Boston, Massachusetts, on 10 March 1912, the son of Edward Marsh Shinkle, a West Point graduate of the class of 1901, and his wife Margery née Gibbons. He was appointed to West Point from the 6th District of Ohio, the same one his father had been appointed from, and entered on 1 July 1929. He graduated 23rd in the class of 1933 on 13 June 1933, and was commissioned as a second lieutenant in the Field Artillery Branch.

Shinkle's first posting was to the 76th Field Artillery Regiment, which was based at the Presidio of Monterey, California. There he met and married Emily Harris, whose father, Henry Leavenworth Harris Jr. graduated from West Point with the class of 1899, grandfather Henry Leavenworth Harris graduated with the class of 1869, and great-grandfather N. Sayre Harris with the class of 1825. He acquired a stepdaughter, Suzanne, from her first marriage. They had two more children: a daughter, Miriam, and a son, John Michael, known as Mike.

Promoted to first lieutenant on 13 June 1936, Shinkle was posted to the 13th Field Artillery Regiment at Schofield Barracks in the Territory of Hawaii. He was seconded to the Ordnance Department on 12 March 1937, and became the ordnance officer of the 18th Composite Wing at Fort Shafter in the Territory of Hawaii. He returned to the United States on 9 May 1938, and attended the Ordnance School at Watertown Arsenal in Massachusetts. He underwent training at the Picatinny Arsenal in New Jersey, and the Aberdeen Proving Ground in Maryland, where he became a proof officer for arms and ammunition. He also earned a master's degree in mechanical engineering from the Massachusetts Institute of Technology in 1939. His thesis was entitled Effect of Heat Treatment on X-Ray Diffraction Lines and his advisor was John Torrey Norton.

== World War II ==
Shinkle was promoted to captain in the Army of the United States on 9 September 1940. He was officially transferred to the Ordnance Department on 2 March 1941. He was promoted to major in the Army of the United States on 1 February 1942 and lieutenant colonel 18 August 42. His service was recognized with promotion to the substantive rank of captain in the Ordnance Department on 13 June 1943, and the award of the Legion of Merit. From 1 November 1944 to 5 June 1945 he served in the G-4 branch of the War Department General Staff. He was promoted to colonel in the Army of the United States on 6 January 1945 and awarded the Commendation Ribbon. He then served as Deputy G-4 of the Transportation Corps from 1 July 1945 to 13 February 1946, earning the Bronze Star Medal.

== Post-war ==
After the war ended Shinkle joined General of the Army George C. Marshall's Mission to China, for which he was a second Commendation Ribbon and the Chinese Order of the Cloud and Banner and Military Order. Returning to the United States, he assumed command of San Francisco Ordnance District on 1 April 1947. His apportionment as a colonel in the Army of the United States was terminated on 30 June 1947, and he reverted to his substantive rank of captain, but he was promoted to major in the Ordnance Department on 15 July 1948. On 1 November 1949 he was then sent to Brazil as Ordnance Officer of the Joint US Military Mission to Brazil.

In 1952, Shinkle became Director of Technical Operations at White Sands Missile Range in New Mexico. He served in the Office of the Chief of Ordnance in Washington, DC, from 1954 to 1956. He was promoted to brigadier general on 6 July 1956. He commanded the Redstone Arsenal from 1956 to 1958, and on 1 April 1958 became the first commander of the Army Rocket and Guided Missile Agency. On 1 July 1960, he became the sixth commander of the White Sands Missile Range, with the rank of major general from 6 February 1961. His work there involved the testing of the Nike Zeus, Hawk, Sergeant and Nike Hercules missiles. For this service he was awarded the Army Distinguished Service Medal. His last assignment was in Paris with the NATO Naval and Missile Section. He retired from the Army in 1963.

== Later life ==
Shinkle became a weapons analysis consultant to Stanford University. He then became Director of the Apollo Manned Space Project at NASA's Kennedy Space Center in Florida. Finally, he joined the Grumman Corporation in Huntsville, Alabama. His first wife died in 1965, and in 1967, he married Peggy Barns of Cocoa Beach, Florida. She too died, in November 1994.

Shinkle died in Phoenix, Arizona, on 10 January 1995. His remains were buried in West Point Cemetery.
