= Manhattan Project =

World War II Allied nuclear weapons program

Manhattan District
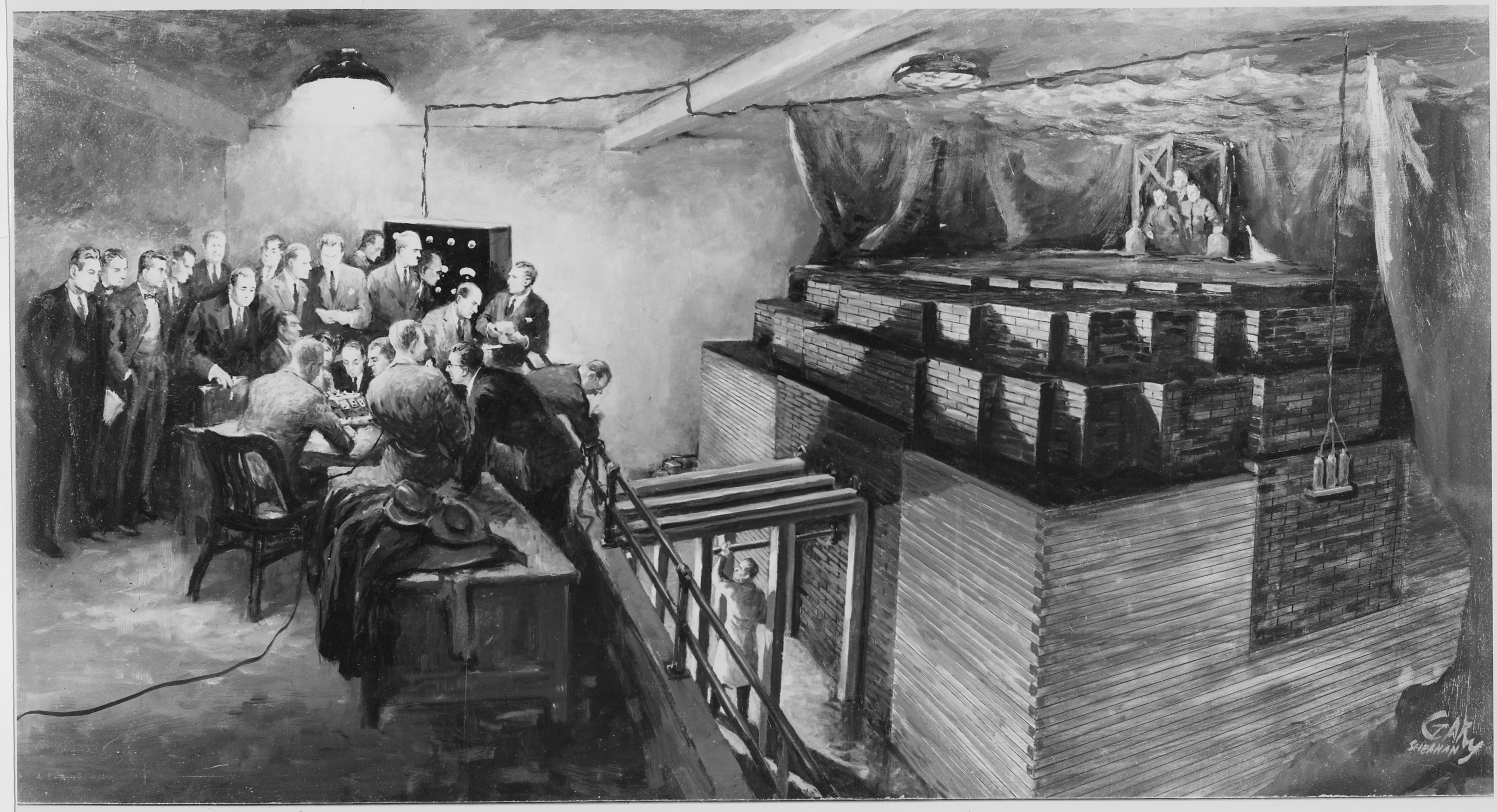
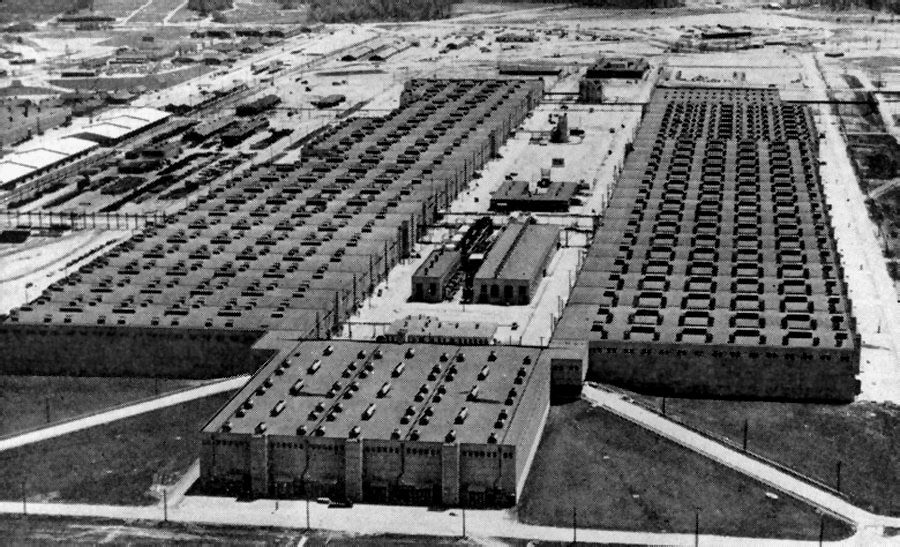
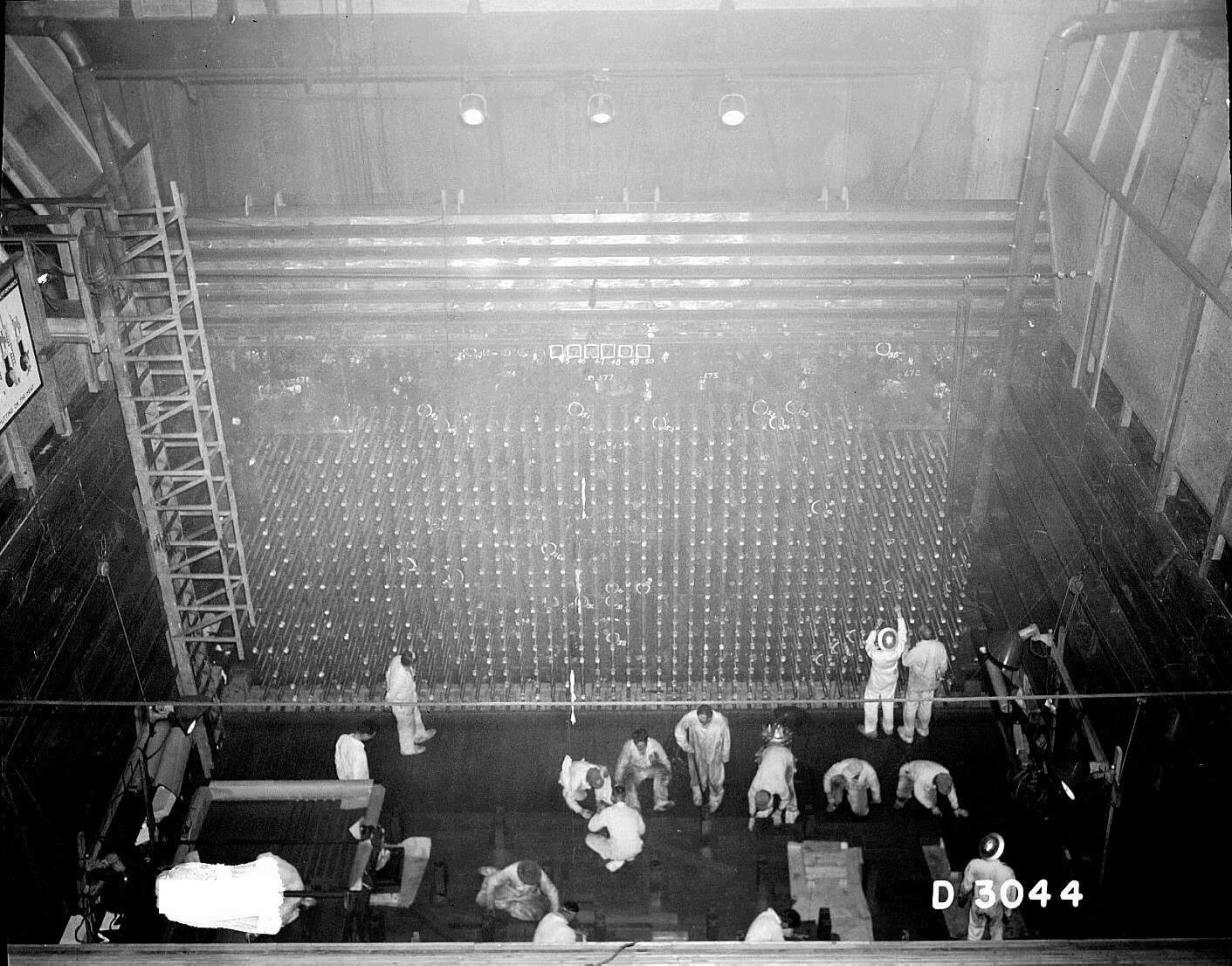
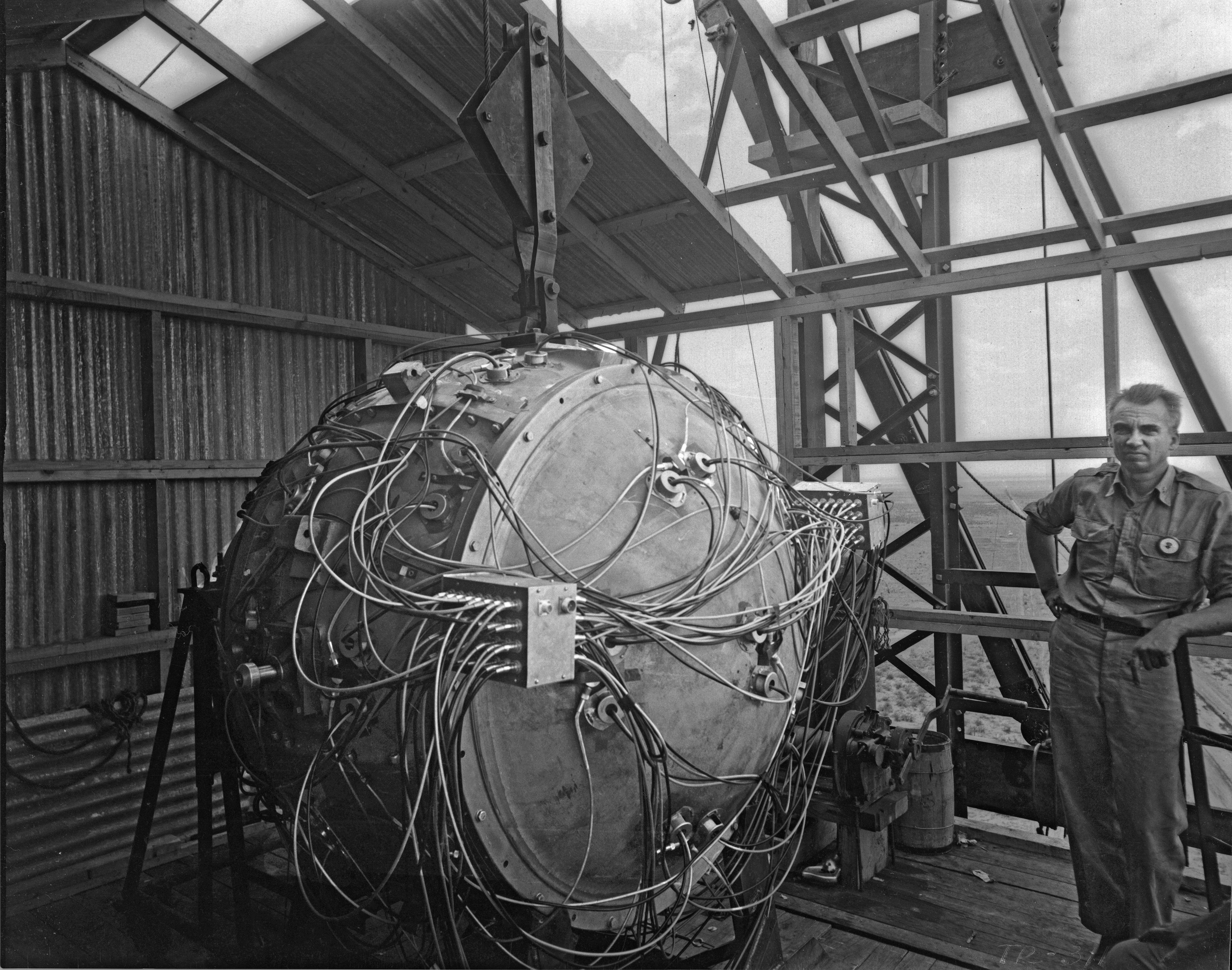
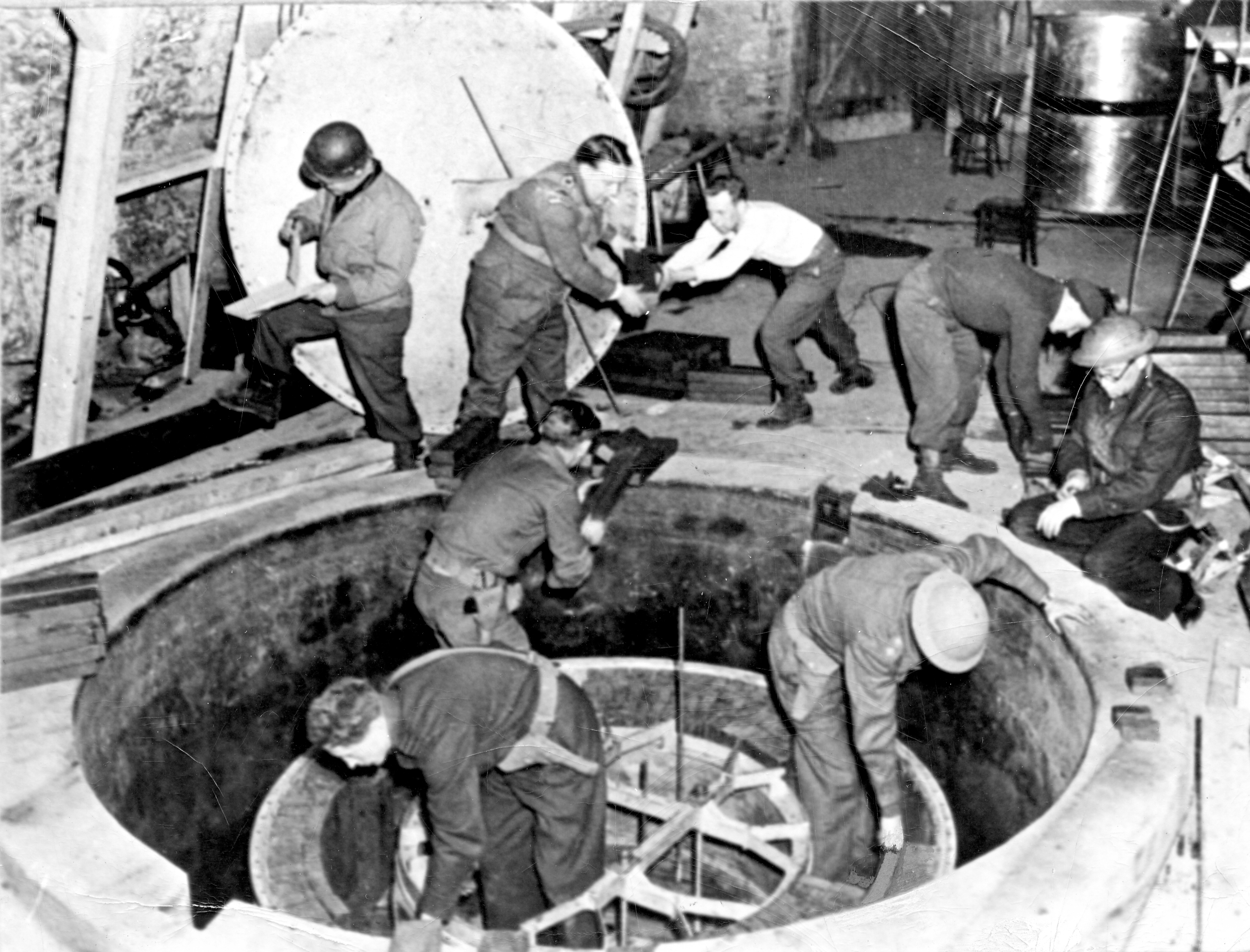
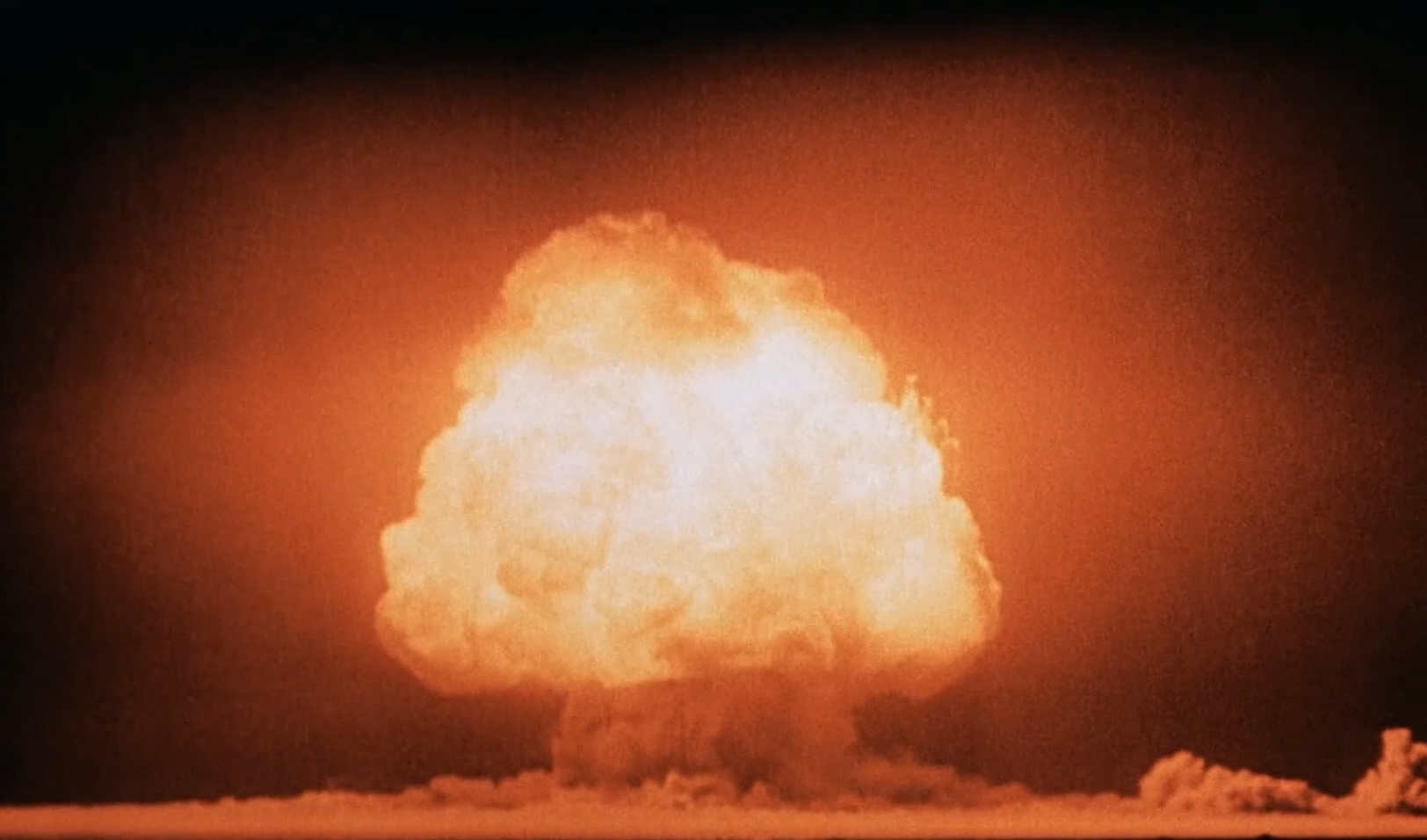
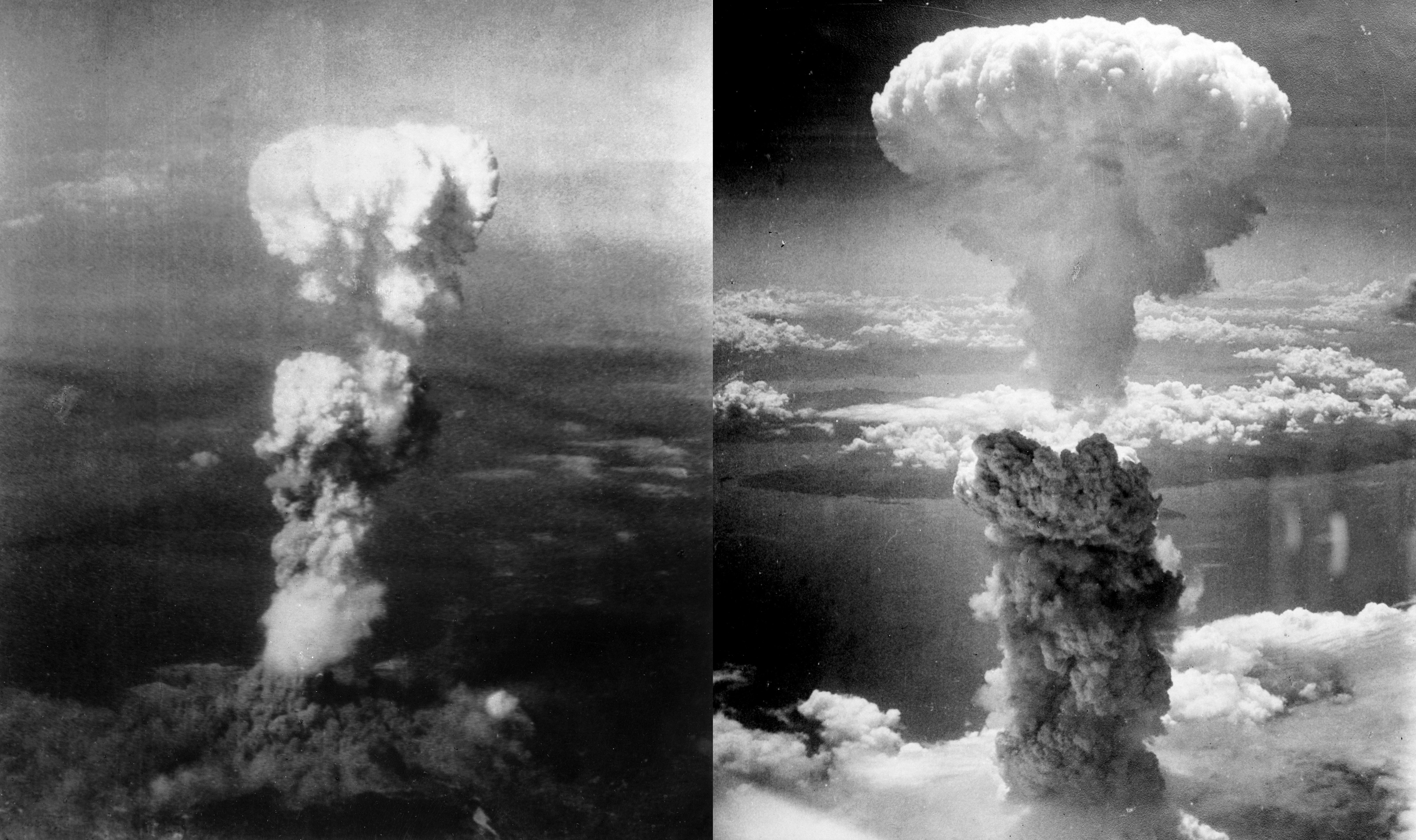
- From top to bottom, left to right: Chicago Pile-1, the first nuclear reactor; K-25, the primary uranium enrichment site; The Hanford B Reactor used for plutonium production; The Gadget implosion device at Los Alamos; Alsos soldiers dismantle the Haigerloch pile of the German nuclear weapons program; The Trinity test, the first nuclear explosion; Atomic bombings of Hiroshima and Nagasaki, the only nuclear attacks in history
- Active: 1942–1946
- Disbanded: 15 August 1947
- Country: United States; United Kingdom; Canada
- Branch: Corps of Engineers
- Headquarters: Oak Ridge, Tennessee, U.S.
- Anniversaries: 13 August 1942
- Engagements: Allied invasion of Italy; Allied invasion of France; Allied invasion of Germany; Atomic bombings of Hiroshima and Nagasaki; Allied occupation of Japan

Commanders
- Notable commanders: James C. Marshall; Kenneth Nichols

Insignia
- Manhattan District Shoulder sleeve insignia

The Manhattan Project was a research and development program undertaken during World War II to produce the first nuclear weapons. It was led by the United States in collaboration with the United Kingdom and Canada. The Manhattan Project employed nearly 130,000 people at its peak and cost nearly US$2 billion (equivalent to about $28 billion in 2025).

From 1942 to 1946, the project was directed by Major General Leslie Groves of the U.S. Army Corps of Engineers. Nuclear physicist J. Robert Oppenheimer was the director of the Los Alamos Laboratory that designed the bombs. The Army program was designated the Manhattan District, as its first headquarters were in Manhattan; the name superseded the initial codename, Development of Substitute Materials, for the entire project. The project absorbed its earlier British counterpart, Tube Alloys.

Over 80 percent of project cost was for building and operating the fissile material production plants. The project proposed both highly enriched uranium and plutonium as fuel for nuclear weapons. Enriched uranium was produced at the Clinton Engineer Works in Tennessee. Plutonium was produced in the world's first industrial-scale nuclear reactors at the Hanford Engineer Works in Washington. These sites were supported by dozens of other facilities across Canada, the US and the UK.

The weapons' designs were produced at the Los Alamos Laboratory (Project Y) in New Mexico, and resulted in two weapon designs used during the war: Little Boy (enriched uranium gun-type) and Fat Man (plutonium implosion). The Fat Man design was initially a low priority fallback option, as it was complex and required explosive lenses, but in 1944 it was confirmed that plutonium from Hanford was not suitable for a gun-type bomb because of the high proportion of plutonium-240. The first nuclear device ever detonated was an implosion-type bomb during the Trinity test, conducted at White Sands Proving Ground in New Mexico on 16 July 1945. The project was responsible for developing the specific means of delivering the weapons onto military targets, and for the use of the Little Boy and Fat Man bombs in the atomic bombings of Hiroshima and Nagasaki in August 1945.

The project was also charged with gathering intelligence on the German nuclear weapon project. Through Operation Alsos, Manhattan Project personnel served in Europe, sometimes behind enemy lines, where they gathered nuclear materials and documents and rounded up German scientists. Despite the Manhattan Project's own emphasis on security, Soviet atomic spies penetrated the program.

In the immediate postwar years, the Manhattan Project conducted weapons testing at Bikini Atoll as part of Operation Crossroads, developed new weapons, promoted the development of the network of national laboratories, supported medical research into radiology, and laid the foundations for the nuclear navy. It maintained control over American atomic weapons research and production until the formation of the United States Atomic Energy Commission (AEC) in January 1947.

== Origins ==
=== Uranium Committee ===
The discovery of nuclear fission by Otto Hahn and Fritz Strassmann in 1938, and its theoretical explanation by Lise Meitner and Otto Frisch, made an atomic bomb using uranium theoretically possible. There were fears that a German atomic bomb project would develop one first. In August 1939, Leo Szilard and Eugene Wigner drafted the Einstein–Szilard letter, which warned of the potential development of "extremely powerful bombs of a new type". It urged the United States to acquire stockpiles of uranium ore and accelerate the research of Enrico Fermi and others into nuclear chain reactions. They had it signed by Albert Einstein and delivered to President Franklin D. Roosevelt.

Enrico Fermi, John R. Dunning, and Dana P. Mitchell in front of the cyclotron in the basement of Pupin Hall at Columbia University, 1940

Roosevelt called on Lyman Briggs to head an Advisory Committee on Uranium; Briggs met with Szilard, Wigner and Edward Teller in October 1939. The committee reported back to Roosevelt in November that uranium "would provide a possible source of bombs with a destructiveness vastly greater than anything now known." In February 1940, the U.S. Navy awarded Columbia University $6,000, most of which Fermi and Szilard spent on graphite. A team of Columbia professors including Fermi, Szilard, Eugene T. Booth and John Dunning created the first nuclear fission reaction in the Americas, verifying the work of Hahn and Strassmann. The same team subsequently built a series of prototype nuclear reactors (then called "atomic piles," a term coined by Fermi) in Pupin Hall at Columbia but were not yet able to achieve a chain reaction.

The work of Briggs' committee was seen as insufficiently urgent by some of the scientists who were familiar with it. When the National Defense Research Committee (NDRC) was formed on 27 June 1940 to coordinate scientific research, the Advisory Committee on Uranium was absorbed into the organization. On 28 June 1941, Roosevelt signed Executive Order 8807, which created the Office of Scientific Research and Development (OSRD), under director Vannevar Bush. The office was empowered to engage in research and large engineering projects, and was immediately converted into the OSRD Section on Uranium. In July 1941, Briggs proposed spending $167,000 on researching uranium, particularly the uranium-235 isotope, and plutonium, which had been isolated for the first time at the University of California in February 1941. (Note: Specifically at its Berkeley campus; however, as of 1940, the University of California had not yet established a formal distinction between the university as a whole and its flagship campus at Berkeley. The process of transforming the university into a multi-campus university system began in March 1951 and was not complete until 1960.) The work, however, was still being conducted at a relatively small scale and scope, as Bush and other administrators were still skeptical that the work could achieve quick success.

=== British intervention ===
In Britain, Otto Robert Frisch and Rudolf Peierls at the University of Birmingham had made a breakthrough investigating the critical mass of uranium-235 in June 1939. Their calculations indicated that it was within an order of magnitude of 10 kilograms (22 lb), small enough to be carried by contemporary bombers. Their March 1940 Frisch–Peierls memorandum initiated the British atomic bomb project and its MAUD Committee, which unanimously recommended pursuing the development of an atomic bomb. In July 1940, Britain had offered to give the United States access to its research, and the Tizard Mission's John Cockcroft briefed American scientists on British developments. He discovered that the American project was smaller than the British, and not as advanced.

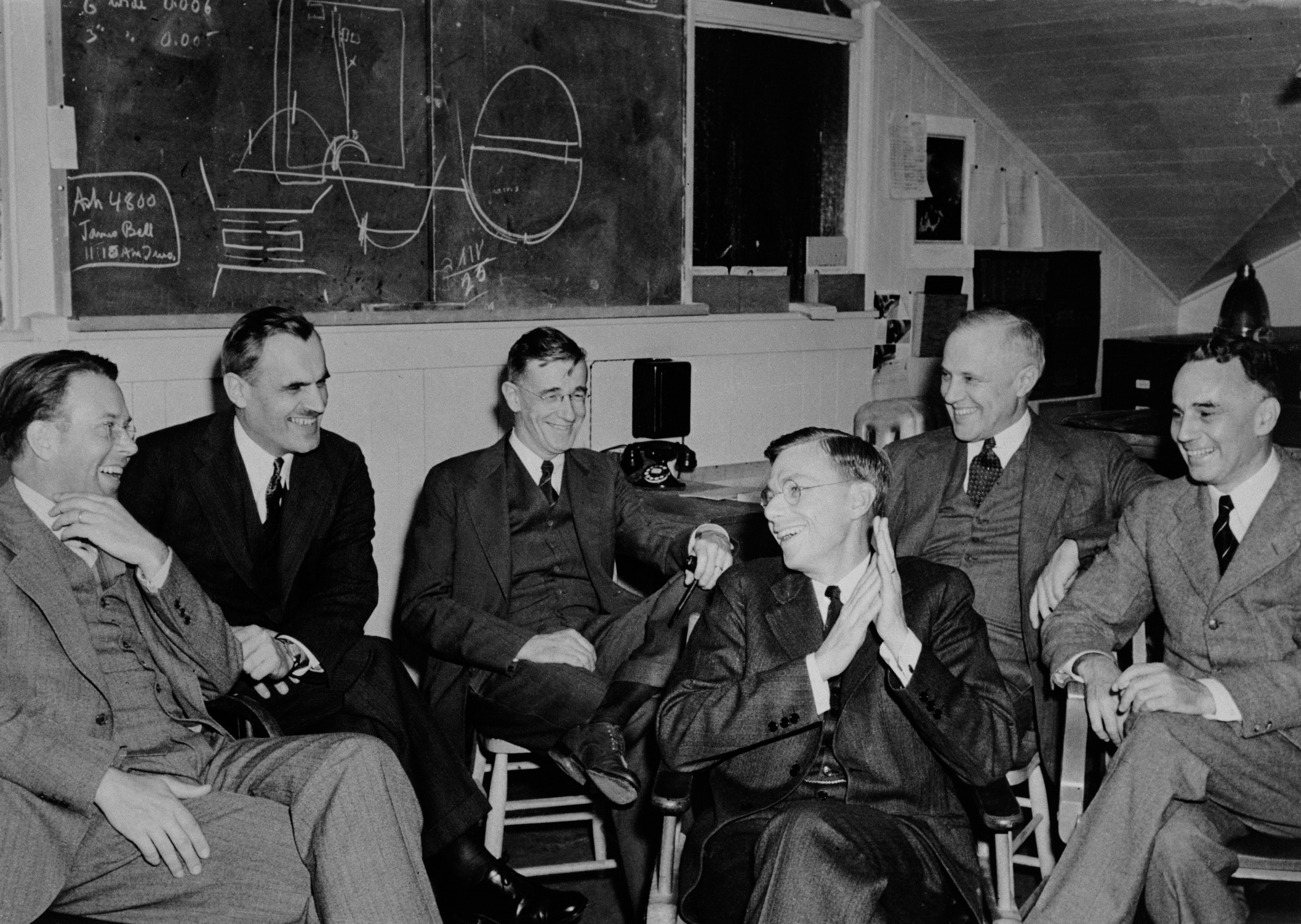
March 1940 meeting at Berkeley, California: Ernest O. Lawrence, Arthur H. Compton, Vannevar Bush, James B. Conant, Karl T. Compton, and Alfred L. Loomis

As part of the scientific exchange, the MAUD Committee's findings were conveyed to the United States. One of its members, the Australian physicist Mark Oliphant, flew to the US in late August 1941 and discovered that data provided by the MAUD Committee had not reached key American physicists. Oliphant set out to find out why the committee's findings were apparently being ignored; the report had been received by Briggs, who had locked it in a safe. Oliphant met with the Uranium Committee and visited Berkeley, California, where he spoke persuasively to Ernest O. Lawrence. Lawrence was sufficiently impressed to commence his own research. He in turn spoke to James B. Conant, Arthur H. Compton and George B. Pegram. Oliphant's mission was a success; key American physicists were now aware of the wartime feasibility of an atomic bomb.

On 9 October 1941, during a meeting with Vannevar Bush about the British conclusions, President Roosevelt approved accelerating the atomic program. He created a Top Policy Group consisting of himself—although he never attended a meeting—Vice President Henry A. Wallace, Bush, Conant, Secretary of War Henry L. Stimson, and the Chief of Staff of the Army, General George C. Marshall. Roosevelt chose the Army to run the project rather than the Navy, because the Army had more experience with managing large-scale construction. He agreed to coordinate the effort with the British and on 11 October sent a message to Prime Minister Winston Churchill, suggesting that they correspond on atomic matters. Bush had, by this point, already begun expanding and altering the leadership of the OSRD Section on Uranium, retaining Briggs as chairman but adding and elevating other personnel. The section itself was renamed to Section S-1.

=== S-1 Committee ===
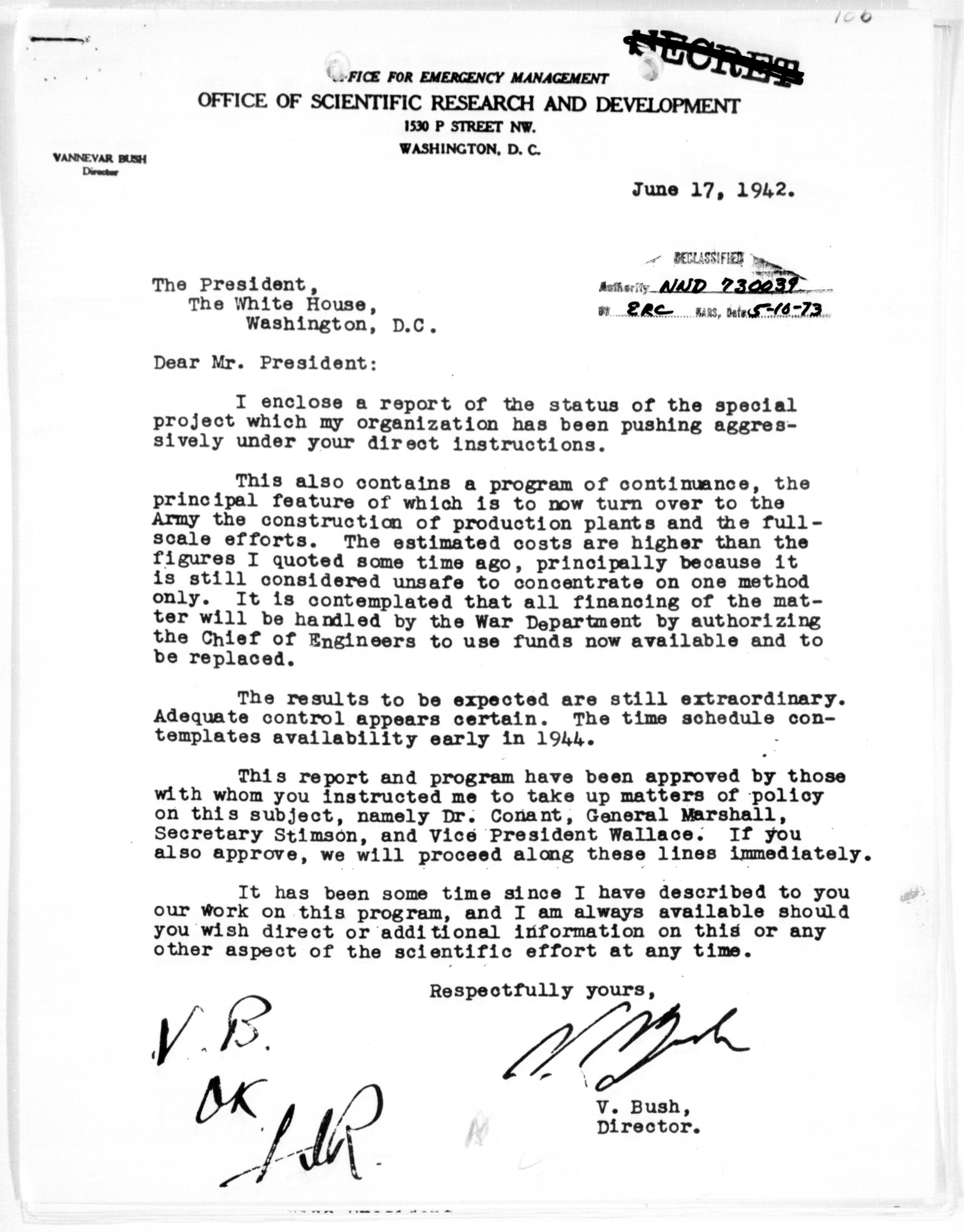
Cover letter written by Vannevar Bush, forwarding the report on "Atomic Fission Bombs" to President Franklin Roosevelt in 1942, recommending the approval of a crash program to build an atomic bomb. Roosevelt approved it by writing on the front of it: "V.B. OK. FDR."

The S-1 Committee meeting on 18 December 1941 was "pervaded by an atmosphere of enthusiasm and urgency" in the wake of the attack on Pearl Harbor and the United States declaration of war on Japan and on Germany. Work was proceeding on three techniques for isotope separation: Lawrence and his team at the University of California investigated electromagnetic separation, Eger Murphree and Jesse Wakefield Beams's team looked into gaseous diffusion at Columbia University, and Philip Abelson directed research into thermal diffusion at the Carnegie Institution of Washington and later the Naval Research Laboratory. Murphree was also supervisor of a separation project, directed by Beams, investigating the use of gas centrifuges. Meanwhile, there were two lines of investigation into nuclear reactor technology, with different neutron moderators: Harold Urey researched heavy water reactors at Columbia, while Arthur Compton organized the Metallurgical Laboratory at the University of Chicago in early 1942 to study plutonium and reactors moderated by graphite.

The S-1 Committee recommended pursuing all five technologies simultaneously. This was approved by Bush, Conant, and Brigadier General Wilhelm D. Styer, who had been designated the Army's representative on nuclear matters. Bush and Conant then took the recommendation to the Top Policy Group with a budget proposal for $54 million for construction by the United States Army Corps of Engineers, $31 million for research and development by OSRD and $5 million for contingencies in fiscal year 1943. They cited the fear of a German atomic bomb as a justification. The proposal recommended that new sites for research and production be selected, that production priorities be established, and that the entire project be put under strict security regulations. On 17 June 1942, President Roosevelt approved the recommendations.

== Organization ==
=== Manhattan District ===
The Chief of Engineers, Major General Eugene Reybold, selected Colonel James C. Marshall to head the Army's part of the project in June 1942. Marshall created a liaison office in Washington, D.C., but established his temporary headquarters at 270 Broadway in New York, where he could draw on administrative support from the Corps of Engineers' North Atlantic Division. It was close to the Manhattan office of Stone & Webster, the principal project contractor, and to Columbia University. He had permission to draw on his former command, the Syracuse District, for staff, and he started with Lieutenant Colonel Kenneth Nichols, who became his deputy.

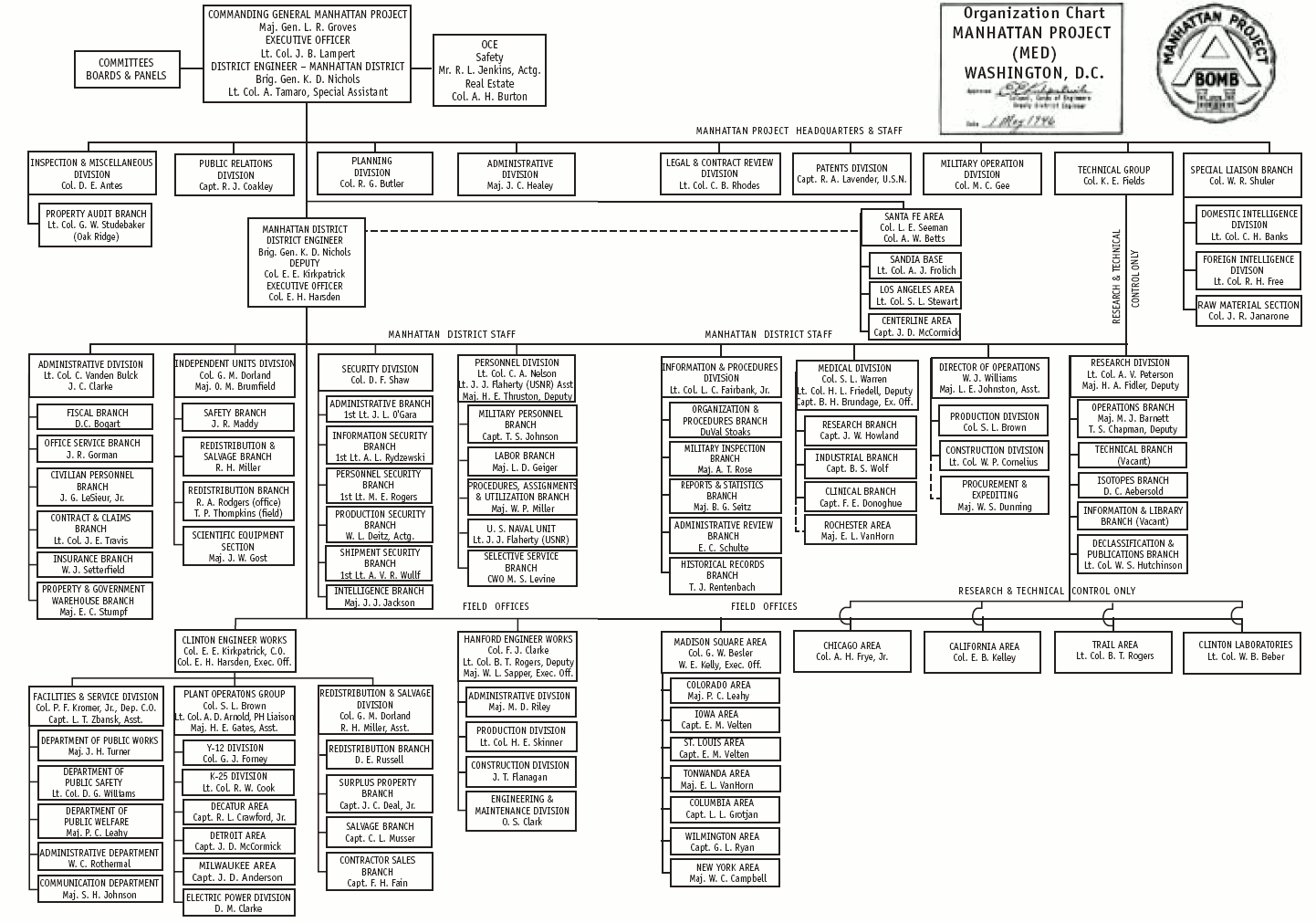
The Manhattan Project Organizational Chart, 1 May 1946

Because most of his task involved construction, Marshall worked in cooperation with the head of the Corps of Engineers Construction Division, Major General Thomas M. Robins, and his deputy, Colonel Leslie Groves. Reybold, Somervell, and Styer decided to call the project "Development of Substitute Materials", but Groves felt that this would draw attention. Since engineer districts normally carried the name of the city where they were located, Marshall and Groves agreed to name the Army's component the Manhattan District; Reybold officially created this district on 13 August. Informally, it was known as the Manhattan Engineer District, or MED. Unlike other districts, it had no geographic boundaries, and Marshall had the authority of a division engineer. Development of Substitute Materials remained as the official codename of the project as a whole but was supplanted over time by "Manhattan".

Marshall later conceded that, "I had never heard of atomic fission but I did know that you could not build much of a plant, much less four of them for $90 million." A single TNT plant that Nichols had recently built in Pennsylvania had cost $128 million. Nor were they impressed with estimates to the nearest order of magnitude, which Groves compared with telling a caterer to prepare for between ten and a thousand guests. A survey team from Stone & Webster had already scouted a site for the production plants. The War Production Board recommended sites around Knoxville, Tennessee, an isolated area where the Tennessee Valley Authority could supply ample electric power and the rivers could provide cooling water for the reactors. After examining several sites, the survey team selected one near Elza, Tennessee. Conant advised that it be acquired at once, Styer agreed, but Marshall temporized, awaiting the results of Conant's reactor experiments. Of the prospective processes, only Lawrence's electromagnetic separation appeared sufficiently advanced for construction to commence.

Marshall and Nichols began assembling the necessary resources. The first step was to obtain a high priority rating for the project. The top ratings were AA-1 through AA-4 in descending order, although there was a special AAA rating reserved for emergencies. Ratings AA-1 and AA-2 were for essential weapons and equipment, so Colonel Lucius D. Clay, the deputy chief of staff at Services and Supply for requirements and resources, felt that the highest rating he could assign was AA-3, although he was willing to provide a AAA rating on request for critical materials if the need arose. Nichols and Marshall were disappointed; AA-3 was the same priority as Nichols' TNT plant in Pennsylvania.

=== Berkeley summer conference ===
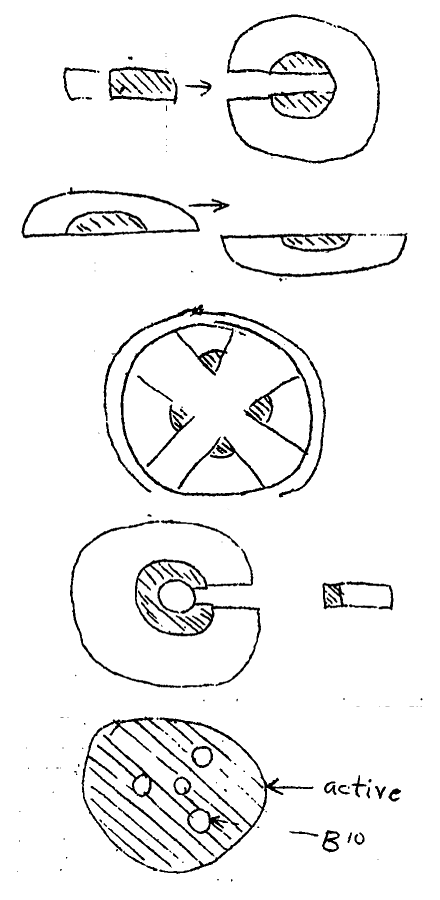
Different fission bomb assembly methods explored during the July 1942 conference (sketches created in 1943 by Robert Serber)

In the spring of 1942, Arthur Compton asked theoretical physicist J. Robert Oppenheimer of the University of California to take over research into fast neutron calculations—key to calculations of critical mass and weapon detonation—from Gregory Breit, who had quit on 18 May 1942 because of concerns over lax operational security. John H. Manley, a physicist at the Metallurgical Laboratory, was assigned to assist Oppenheimer by coordinating experimental physics groups scattered across the country. Oppenheimer and Robert Serber of the University of Illinois examined the problems of neutron diffusion—how neutrons moved in a nuclear chain reaction—and hydrodynamics—how the explosion produced by a chain reaction might behave.

To review this work and the general theory of fission reactions, Oppenheimer and Fermi convened meetings at the University of Chicago in June and at the University of California in July 1942 with theoretical physicists Hans Bethe, John Van Vleck, Edward Teller, Emil Konopinski, Robert Serber, Stan Frankel, and Eldred C. (Carlyle) Nelson, and experimental physicists Emilio Segrè, Felix Bloch, Franco Rasetti, Manley, and Edwin McMillan. They tentatively confirmed that a fission bomb was theoretically possible.

The properties of pure uranium-235 were relatively unknown, as were those of plutonium, which had only been isolated by Glenn Seaborg and his team in February 1941. The scientists at the July 1942 conference envisioned creating plutonium in nuclear reactors where uranium-238 atoms absorbed neutrons that had been emitted from fissioning uranium-235. At this point no reactor had been built, and only tiny quantities of plutonium were available from cyclotrons. Even by December 1943, only two milligrams had been produced. There were many ways of arranging the fissile material into a critical mass. The simplest was shooting a "cylindrical plug" into a sphere of "active material" with a "tamper"—dense material to focus neutrons inward and keep the reacting mass together to increase its efficiency. They also explored designs involving spheroids, a primitive form of "implosion" suggested by Richard C. Tolman, and the possibility of autocatalytic methods to increase the efficiency of the bomb as it exploded.

As the idea of the fission bomb was theoretically settled—at least until more experimental data was available—Edward Teller pushed for discussion of a more powerful bomb: the "super", now usually referred to as a "hydrogen bomb", which would use the heat from a detonating fission bomb to start a nuclear fusion reaction in a mass of deuterium and tritium. Such a weapon could theoretically be thousands of times more powerful than a fission bomb. The complexity of the physics, and the number of unknowns involved, made it difficult to establish whether such a weapon would work at the time. As any "super" bomb would first require a fission weapon, relatively few resources were dedicated to investigating the "super" during the war, and knowledge that it was a possibility was kept even more secret than other project work.

During the initial discussion about fusion reactions, Teller raised the speculative possibility that an atomic bomb might "ignite" the atmosphere because of a hypothetical fusion reaction of nitrogen nuclei. (Note: The reaction Teller was most concerned with was: ^{14}_{7}N + ^{14}_{7}N → ^{24}_{12}Mg + ^{4}_{2}He (alpha particle) + 17.7 MeV.) Bethe calculated that it was "extremely unlikely", but the worry was great-enough that Oppenheimer reported on it to Arthur Compton. Oppenheimer visited Compton in person to discuss it, and Compton stated that if "the chances were more than approximately three in a million" it could happen, the project would have to stop. The theorists ultimately concluded that "for practical purposes" it had a "negligible" chance of happening. A postwar report co-authored by Teller concluded that "whatever the temperature to which a section of the atmosphere may be heated, no self-propagating chain of nuclear reactions is likely to be started."

=== Military Policy Committee ===
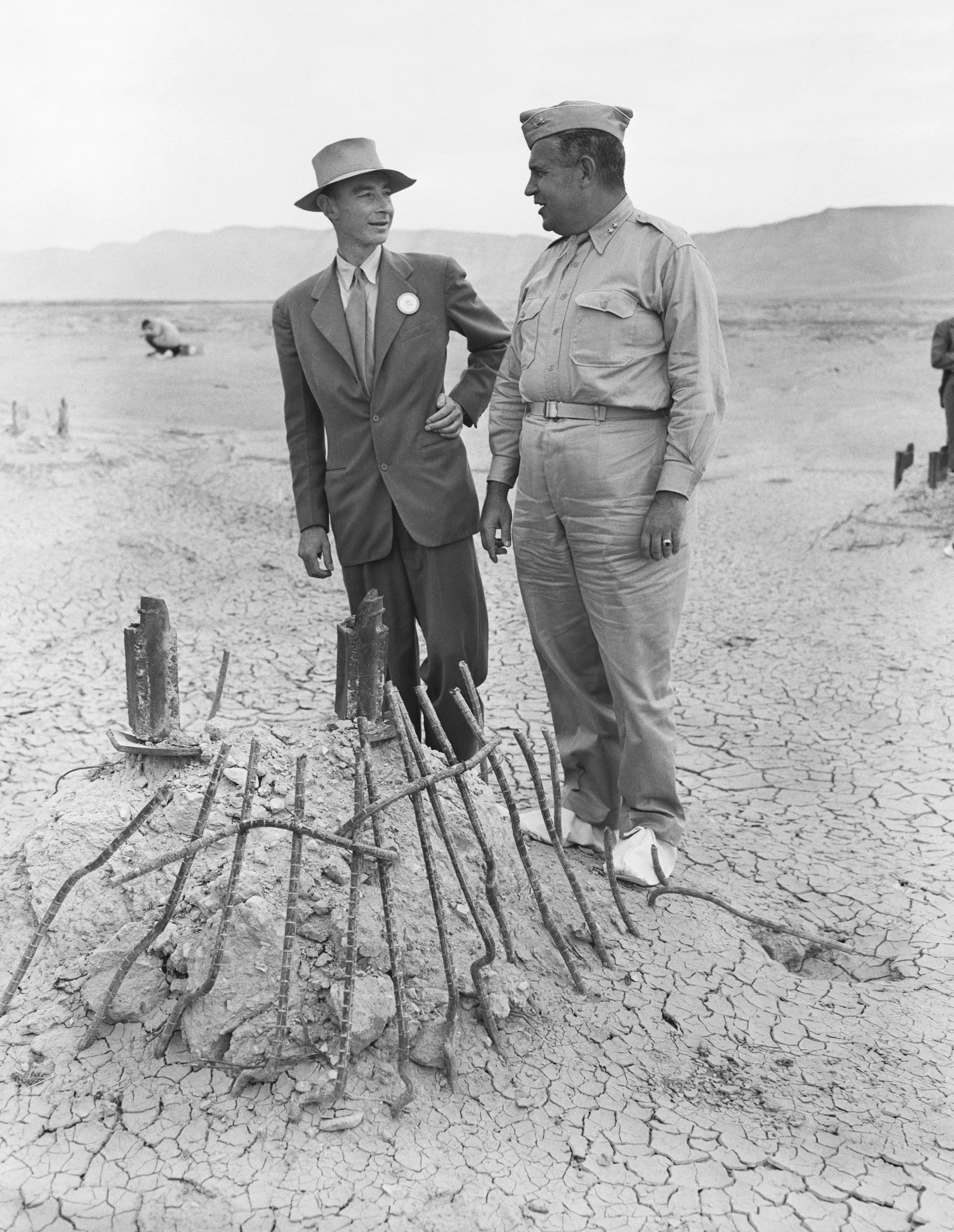
Oppenheimer and Groves at the remains of the Trinity test in September 1945, two months after the test blast and just after the end of World War II. The white overshoes prevented fallout from sticking to the soles of their shoes.

Vannevar Bush became dissatisfied with Colonel Marshall's failure to get the project moving forward expeditiously and felt that more aggressive leadership was required. He spoke to Harvey Bundy and Generals Marshall, Somervell, and Styer about his concerns, advocating that the project be placed under a senior policy committee, with a prestigious officer, preferably Styer, as director.

Somervell and Styer selected Groves for the post; General Marshall ordered that he be promoted to brigadier general, as it was felt that the title "general" would hold more sway with the academic scientists working on the project. Groves' orders placed him directly under Somervell rather than Reybold, with Colonel Marshall now answerable to Groves. Groves established his headquarters in Washington, D.C., in the New War Department Building, where Colonel Marshall had his liaison office. He assumed command of the Manhattan Project on 23 September 1942. Later that day, he attended a meeting called by Stimson, which established a Military Policy Committee, responsible to the Top Policy Group, consisting of Bush (with Conant as an alternate), Styer and Rear Admiral William R. Purnell. Tolman and Conant were later appointed as Groves' scientific advisers.

On 19 September, Groves went to Donald Nelson, the chairman of the War Production Board, and asked for broad authority to issue a AAA rating whenever it was required. Nelson initially balked but quickly caved in when Groves threatened to go to the president. Groves promised not to use the AAA rating unless it was necessary. It soon transpired that for the routine requirements of the project the AAA rating was too high but the AA-3 rating was too low. After a long campaign, Groves finally received AA-1 authority on 1 July 1944. According to Groves, "In Washington you became aware of the importance of top priority. Most everything proposed in the Roosevelt administration would have top priority. That would last for about a week or two and then something else would get top priority".

One of Groves' early problems was to find a director for Project Y, the group that would design and build the bomb. The obvious choice was one of the three laboratory heads, Urey, Lawrence, or Arthur Compton, but they could not be spared. Compton recommended Oppenheimer, who was already intimately familiar with the bomb design concepts. However, Oppenheimer had little administrative experience, and, unlike Urey, Lawrence, and Compton, had not won a Nobel Prize, which many scientists felt that the head of such an important laboratory should have. There were also concerns about Oppenheimer's security status, as many of his associates were communists, including his wife, Kitty; his girlfriend, Jean Tatlock; and his brother, Frank. A long conversation in October 1942 convinced Groves and Nichols that Oppenheimer thoroughly understood the issues involved in setting up a laboratory in a remote area and should be appointed as its director. Groves personally waived the security requirements and issued Oppenheimer's clearance on 20 July 1943.

=== Collaboration with the United Kingdom ===
The British and Americans exchanged nuclear information but did not initially combine their efforts; in 1940–41 the British project (Tube Alloys) was larger and more advanced. British leadership initially opposed an offer by Bush and Conant in August 1941 to pool the nations' atomic efforts, but the British, who had made significant advances in research early in the war, did not have the resources to carry it into development while devoting a large portion of their economy to the war; Tube Alloys soon fell behind its American counterpart. The roles of the two countries were reversed, and in January 1943 Conant notified the British that they would no longer receive atomic information except in certain areas. The British investigated the possibility of an independent nuclear program but determined that it could not be ready in time to impact the war in Europe.

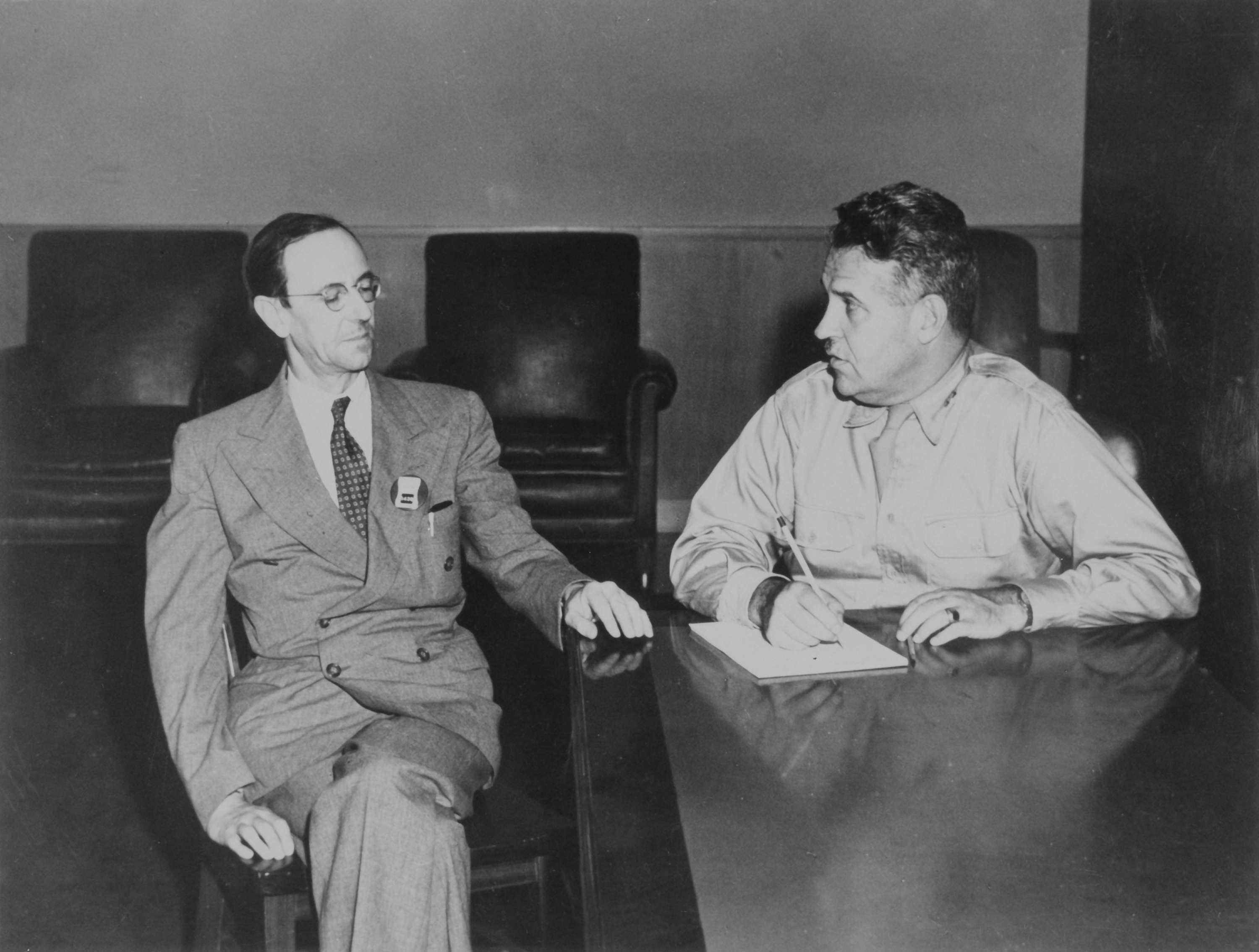
Groves confers with James Chadwick, the head of the British Mission.

By March 1943 Conant decided that James Chadwick and one or two other British scientists were important enough that the bomb design team at Los Alamos needed them, despite the risk of revealing weapon design secrets. In August 1943 Churchill and Roosevelt negotiated the Quebec Agreement, which established the Combined Policy Committee to coordinate the efforts of the US and UK; Canada was not a signatory, but the Agreement provided for a Canadian representative on the Combined Policy Committee in view of Canada's contribution to the effort. An agreement between Roosevelt and Churchill known as the Hyde Park Aide-Mémoire, signed in late September 1944, extended the Quebec Agreement to the postwar period and suggested that "when a 'bomb' is finally available, it might perhaps, after mature consideration, be used against the Japanese, who should be warned that this bombardment will be repeated until they surrender".

When cooperation resumed after the Quebec Agreement, the Americans' progress and expenditures amazed the British. Chadwick pressed for British involvement in the Manhattan Project to the fullest extent and abandoned hopes of an independent British project during the war. With Churchill's backing, he attempted to ensure that every request from Groves for assistance was honored. The British Mission that arrived in the United States in December 1943 included Niels Bohr, Otto Frisch, Klaus Fuchs, Rudolf Peierls, and Ernest Titterton. More scientists arrived in early 1944. While those assigned to gaseous diffusion left by the fall of 1944, the thirty-five working under Oliphant with Lawrence at Berkeley were assigned to existing laboratory groups and most stayed until the end of the war. The nineteen sent to Los Alamos also joined existing groups, primarily related to implosion and bomb assembly, but not the plutonium-related ones. The Quebec Agreement specified that nuclear weapons would not be used against another country without the mutual consent of the US and UK. In June 1945, Wilson agreed that the nuclear bombing of Japan would be recorded as a decision of the Combined Policy Committee.

The Combined Policy Committee created the Combined Development Trust in June 1944, with Groves as its chairman, to procure uranium and thorium ores on international markets. The Belgian Congo and Canada held much of the world's uranium outside Eastern Europe, and the Belgian Government in Exile was in London. Britain agreed to give the United States most of the Belgian ore, as it could not use most of the supply without restricted American research. In 1944, the Trust purchased 3,440,000 pounds (1,560,000 kg) of uranium oxide ore from companies operating mines in the Belgian Congo. To avoid briefing US Secretary of the Treasury Henry Morgenthau Jr., a special account not subject to the usual auditing and controls was used to hold Trust monies. Between 1944 and his resignation from the Trust in 1947, Groves deposited a total of $37.5 million.

Groves later said that the British scientists' direct contributions to the Manhattan Project were "helpful but not vital," but "there probably would have been no atomic bomb to drop on Hiroshima" without Britain's (particularly Churchill's) impetus. The British wartime participation was crucial to the success of their independent nuclear weapons program when the McMahon Act of 1946 temporarily ended American nuclear cooperation.

== Project sites ==
A selection of US and Canadian sites important to the Manhattan Project. Research and production took place at more than thirty sites across the US, the UK, and Canada. Click on the location for more information.
- Purple: Fissile material production
- Orange: Feed materials production
- Green: Research
- Black: Logistics/other

=== Oak Ridge ===
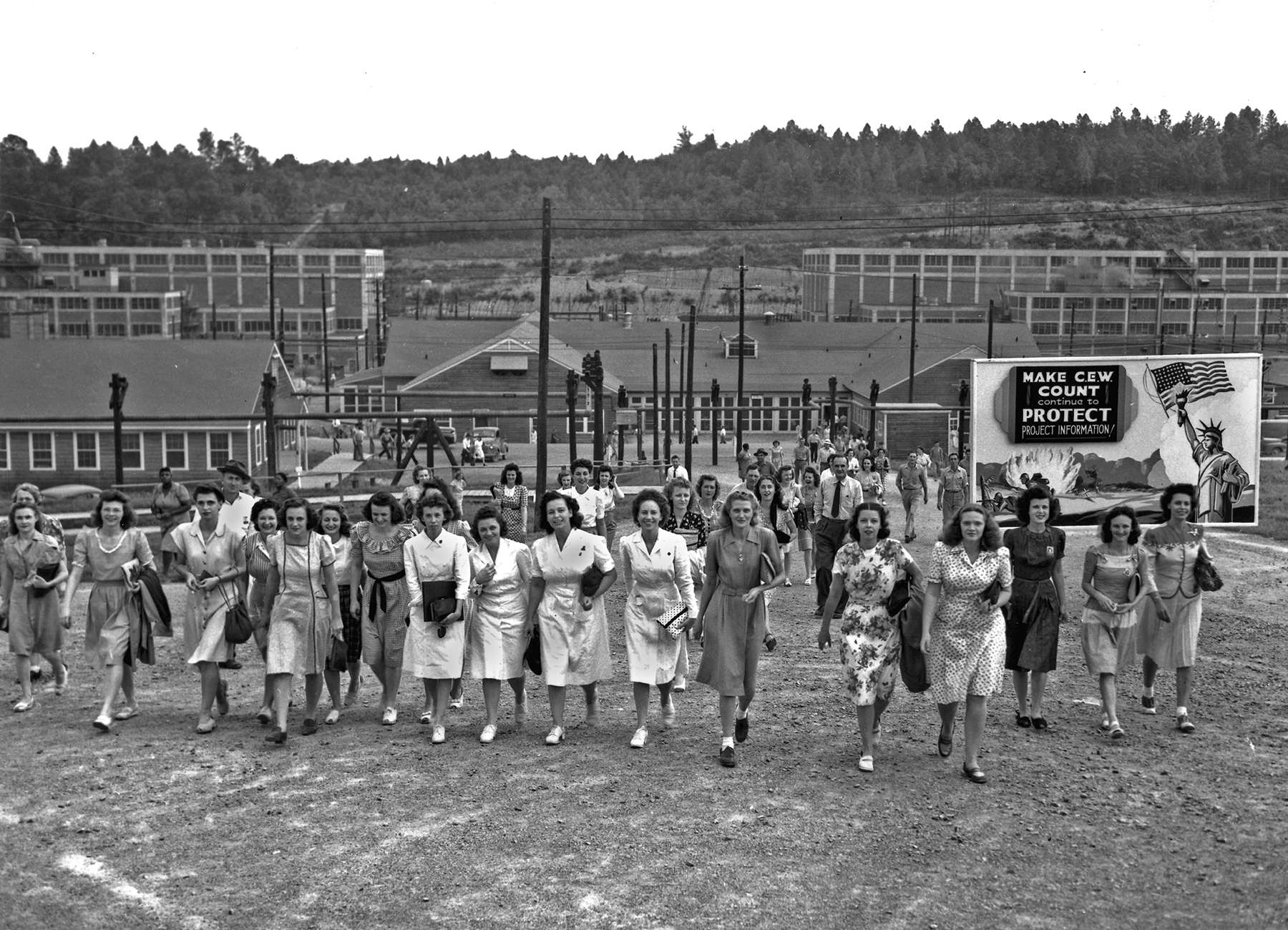
Shift change at the Y-12 uranium enrichment facility at the Clinton Engineer Works in Oak Ridge, Tennessee, on 11 August 1945. By May 1945, 82,000 people were employed at the Clinton Engineer Works. Photograph by the Manhattan District photographer Ed Westcott.

The day after he took over the project, Groves went to Tennessee with Colonel Marshall to inspect the proposed site there, and Groves was impressed. On 29 September 1942, United States Under Secretary of War Robert P. Patterson authorized the Corps of Engineers to acquire 56,000 acres (23,000 ha) of land by eminent domain at a cost of $3.5 million. An additional 3,000 acres (1,200 ha) was subsequently acquired. About 1,000 families were affected by the order, which came into effect on 7 October. Protests, legal appeals, and a 1943 Congressional inquiry were to no avail. By mid-November U.S. Marshals were posting notices to vacate on farmhouse doors, and construction contractors were moving in. Some families were given two weeks' notice to vacate farms that had been their homes for generations. The ultimate cost of the land acquisition, which was not completed until March 1945, was only about $2.6 million—around $47 an acre. When presented with a proclamation declaring Oak Ridge a total exclusion area that no one could enter without military permission, the governor of Tennessee, Prentice Cooper, angrily tore it up.

Initially known as the Kingston Demolition Range, the site was officially renamed the Clinton Engineer Works (CEW) in early 1943. While Stone & Webster concentrated on the production facilities, the architectural and engineering firm Skidmore, Owings & Merrill developed a residential community for 13,000. The community was located on the slopes of Black Oak Ridge, from which the new town of Oak Ridge got its name. The Army presence at Oak Ridge increased in August 1943 when Nichols replaced Marshall as head of the Manhattan Engineer District. One of his first tasks was to move the district headquarters to Oak Ridge, although the name of the district did not change. In September 1943 the administration of community facilities was outsourced to Turner Construction Company through a subsidiary, the Roane-Anderson Company. Chemical engineers were part of "frantic efforts" to make 10% to 12% enriched uranium 235, with tight security and fast approvals for supplies and materials. The population of Oak Ridge soon expanded well beyond the initial plans, and peaked at 75,000 in May 1945, by which time 82,000 people were employed at the Clinton Engineer Works, and 10,000 by Roane-Anderson.

=== Los Alamos ===
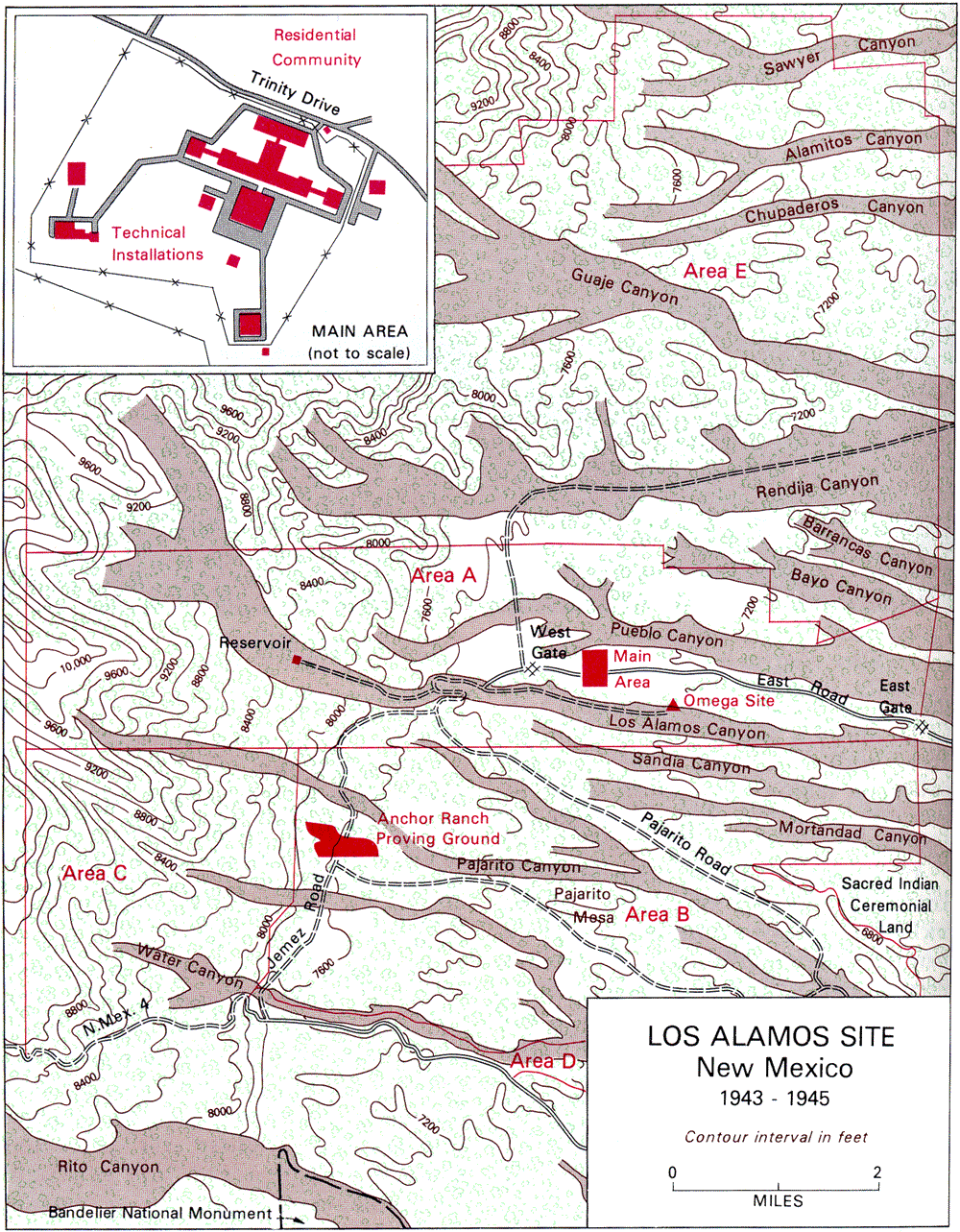
Map of Los Alamos site, New Mexico, 1943–1945

The idea of locating Project Y at Oak Ridge was considered, but it was decided that it should be in a remote location. On Oppenheimer's recommendation, the search for a suitable site was narrowed to the vicinity of Albuquerque, New Mexico, where Oppenheimer owned a ranch. On 16 November 1942, Oppenheimer, Groves, Dudley and others toured the vicinity of the Los Alamos Ranch School. Oppenheimer expressed a strong preference for the site, citing its natural beauty, which, it was hoped, would inspire those working on the project. The engineers were concerned about the poor access road, and whether the water supply would be adequate, but otherwise felt that it was ideal.

Patterson approved the acquisition of the site on 25 November 1942, authorizing $440,000 for the purchase of pre-calculated 54,000 acres (22,000 ha), all but 8,900 acres (3,600 ha) of which were already owned by the Federal Government. Secretary of Agriculture Claude R. Wickard granted about 45,000 acres (18,000 ha) of United States Forest Service land to the War Department "for so long as the military necessity continues". Wartime land purchases eventually came to 49,383 acres (19,985 ha), but only $414,971 was spent. Work commenced in December 1942. Groves initially allocated $300,000 for construction, three times Oppenheimer's estimate, but by the time Sundt (Note: M.M. Sundt Construction Co., the general contractor and construction company responsible for Los Alamos.) finished on 30 November 1943, over $7 million had been spent.

During the war, Los Alamos was referred to as "Site Y" or "the Hill". Initially it was to have been a military laboratory with Oppenheimer and other researchers commissioned into the Army, but Robert Bacher and Isidor Rabi balked at the idea and convinced Oppenheimer that other scientists would object. Conant, Groves, and Oppenheimer then devised a compromise whereby the laboratory was operated by the University of California under contract to the War Department. Dorothy McKibbin ran the branch office in Santa Fe, where she met new arrivals and issued them passes.

=== Chicago ===
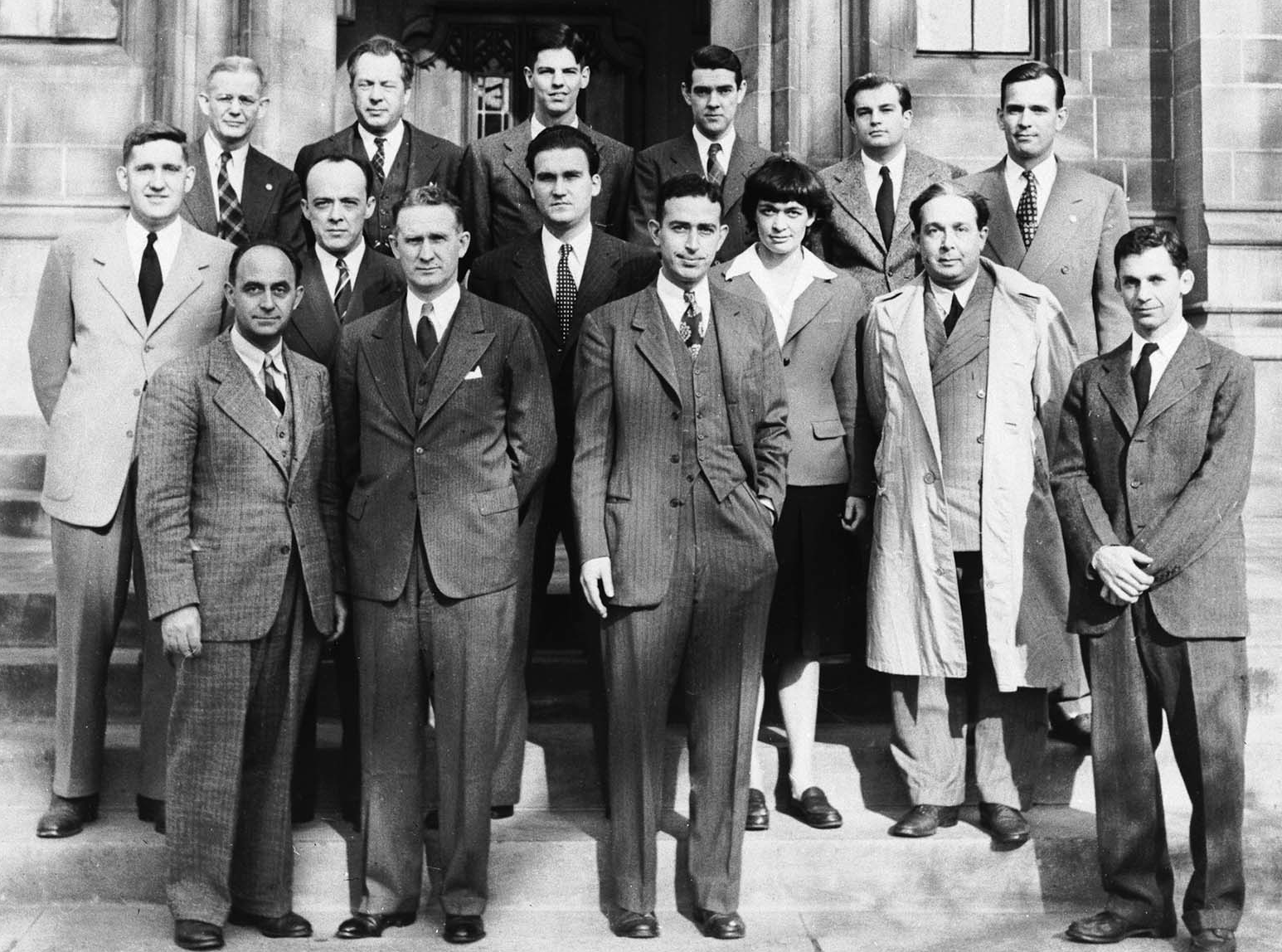
Some of the University of Chicago team that worked on the Chicago Pile-1, the first nuclear reactor, including Enrico Fermi and Walter Zinn in the front row and Harold Agnew, Leona Woods and Leó Szilárd in the second

An Army-OSRD council on 25 June 1942 decided to build a pilot plant for plutonium production in the Argonne Forest preserve, southwest of Chicago. This was designated Site A. In July, Nichols arranged for a lease of 1,025 acres (415 ha) from the Cook County Forest Preserve District, and Captain James F. Grafton was appointed Chicago area engineer. It soon became apparent that the scale of operations was too great for the area, and it was decided to build the pilot plant at Oak Ridge and keep a research and testing facility in Chicago.

Delays in establishing the plant at Site A led Arthur Compton to authorize the Metallurgical Laboratory to construct the first nuclear reactor beneath the bleachers of Stagg Field at the University of Chicago. The reactor required an enormous amount of highly purified graphite blocks and uranium in both metallic and powdered oxide forms. At the time, there was a limited source of pure uranium metal; Frank Spedding of Iowa State University was able to produce only two short tons. Three short tons was supplied by Westinghouse Lamp Plant, produced in a rush with makeshift process. A large square balloon was constructed by Goodyear Tire to encase the reactor.

On 2 December 1942, a team led by Enrico Fermi initiated the first artificial (Note: Natural self-sustaining nuclear reactions have occurred in the earth's crust in the very distant past.) self-sustaining nuclear chain reaction in an experimental reactor known as Chicago Pile-1. After the reaction achieved criticality, Compton reported the success to Conant in Washington, D.C., by a coded phone call, saying, "The Italian navigator [Fermi] has just landed in the new world." (Note: The allusion here is to the Italian navigator Christopher Columbus, who reached the Caribbean in 1492.)

In January 1943, Grafton's successor, Major Arthur V. Peterson, ordered Chicago Pile-1 dismantled and reassembled at the Site A in the forest preserve, as he regarded the operation of a reactor as too hazardous for a densely populated area. Site A continued scientific research as a secret extension of the Metallurgical Laboratory at the university. Chicago Pile-3, the first heavy water reactor, also went critical at this site, on 15 May 1944. After the war, operations at Site A were moved about 6 miles (9.7 km) to DuPage County, the current location of the Argonne National Laboratory.

=== Hanford ===
By December 1942 there were concerns that even Oak Ridge was too close to a major population center (Knoxville) in the unlikely event of a major nuclear accident. Groves recruited DuPont in November 1942 to be the prime contractor for the construction of the plutonium production complex. The president of the company, Walter S. Carpenter Jr., wanted no profit of any kind; for legal reasons a nominal fee of one dollar was agreed upon.

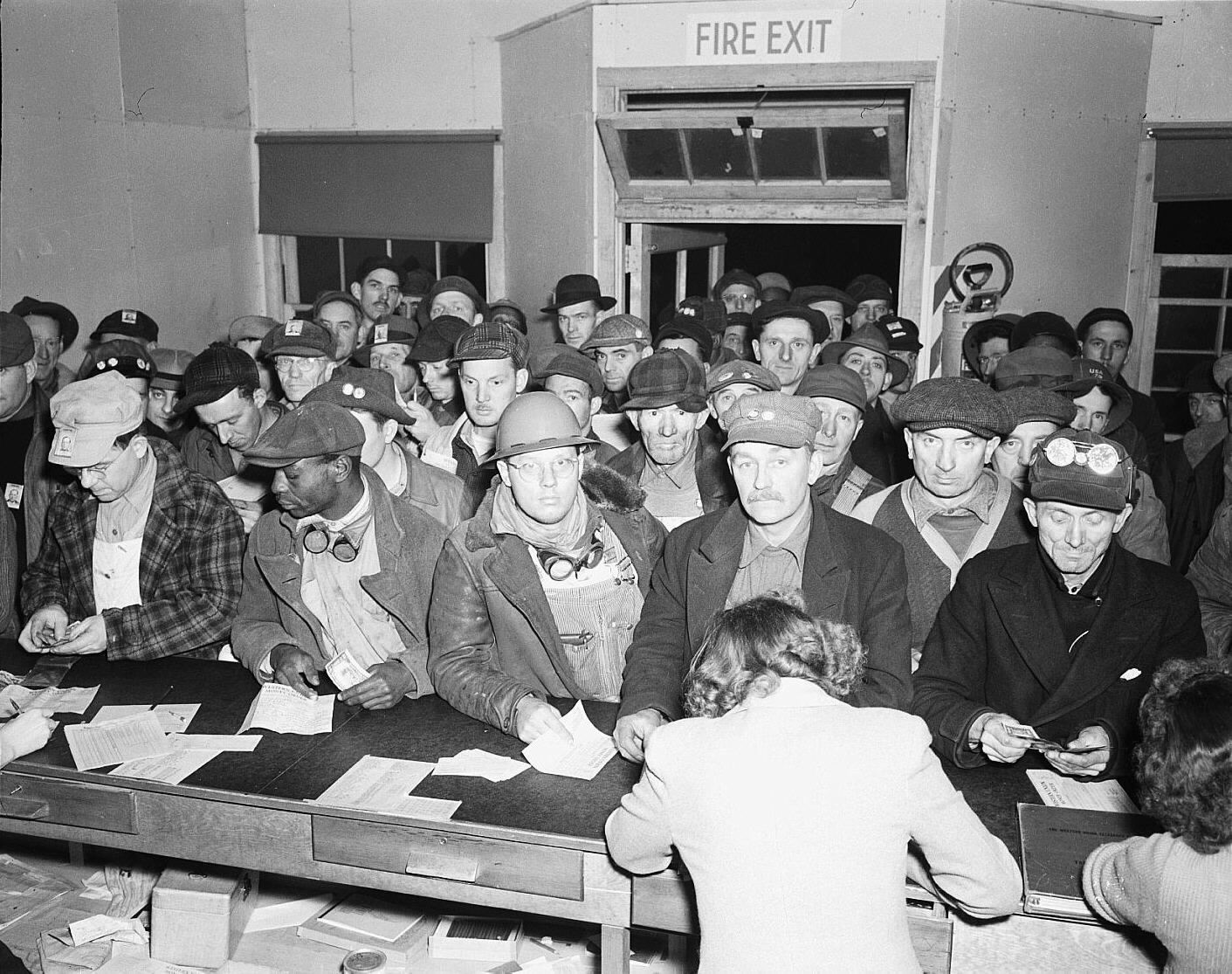
Hanford workers collect their paychecks at the Western Union office.

DuPont recommended that the site be located far from the existing uranium production facility at Oak Ridge. In December 1942, Groves dispatched Colonel Franklin Matthias and DuPont engineers to scout potential sites. Matthias reported that Hanford Site near Richland, Washington, was "ideal in virtually all respects". It was isolated and near the Columbia River, which could supply sufficient water to cool the reactors. Groves visited the site in January and established the Hanford Engineer Works (HEW), codenamed "Site W".

Under Secretary Patterson gave his approval on 9 February, allocating $5 million for the acquisition of 430,000 acres (170,000 ha). The federal government relocated some 1,500 residents of nearby settlements, as well as the Wanapum and other tribes using the area. A dispute arose with farmers over compensation for crops, which had already been planted. Where schedules allowed, the Army allowed the crops to be harvested, but this was not always possible. The land acquisition process dragged on and was not completed before the end of the Manhattan Project in December 1946.

The dispute did not delay work. Although progress on the reactor design at Metallurgical Laboratory and DuPont was not sufficiently advanced to accurately predict the scope of the project, a start was made in April 1943 on facilities for an estimated 25,000 workers, half of whom were expected to live on-site. By July 1944, some 1,200 buildings had been erected and nearly 51,000 people were living in the construction camp. As area engineer, Matthias exercised overall control of the site. At its peak, the construction camp was the third most populous town in Washington state. Hanford operated a fleet of over 900 buses, more than the city of Chicago. Like Los Alamos and Oak Ridge, Richland was a gated community with restricted access, but it looked more like a typical wartime American boomtown: the military profile was lower, and physical security elements like high fences and guard dogs were less evident.

=== Canadian sites ===
Canada provided research, extraction and production of uranium and plutonium, and Canadian scientists worked at Los Alamos.

==== British Columbia ====
Cominco had produced electrolytic hydrogen at Trail, British Columbia, since 1930. Urey suggested in 1941 that it could produce heavy water. To the existing $10 million plant consisting of 3,215 cells consuming 75 MW of hydroelectric power, secondary electrolysis cells were added to increase the deuterium concentration in the water from 2.3% to 99.8%. For this process, Hugh Taylor of Princeton developed a platinum-on-carbon catalyst for the first three stages while Urey developed a nickel-chromia one for the fourth stage tower. The final cost was $2.8 million. The Canadian Government did not officially learn of the project until August 1942. Trail's heavy water production started in January 1944 and continued until 1956. Heavy water from Trail was used for Chicago Pile 3, the first reactor using heavy water and natural uranium, which went critical on 15 May 1944.

==== Ontario ====
The Chalk River, Ontario, site was established to rehouse the Allied effort at the Montreal Laboratory away from an urban area. A new community was built at Deep River, Ontario, to provide residences and facilities for the team members. The site was chosen for its proximity to the industrial manufacturing area of Ontario and Quebec, and proximity to a rail head adjacent to a large military base, Camp Petawawa. Located on the Ottawa River, it had access to abundant water. The first director of the new laboratory was Hans von Halban. He was replaced by John Cockcroft in May 1944, who was succeeded by Bennett Lewis in September 1946. A pilot reactor known as ZEEP (zero-energy experimental pile) became the first Canadian reactor, and the first to be completed outside the United States, when it went critical in September 1945; ZEEP remained in use by researchers until 1970. A larger 10 MW NRX reactor, which was designed during the war, was completed and went critical in July 1947.

==== Northwest Territories ====
The Eldorado Mine at Port Radium was a source of uranium ore.

=== Heavy water sites ===
Although DuPont's preferred designs for the nuclear reactors were helium cooled and used graphite as a moderator, DuPont still expressed an interest in using heavy water as a backup. The P-9 Project was the government's codename for the heavy water production program. It was estimated that 3 short tons (2.7 t) of heavy water would be required per month. The plant at Trail, then under construction, could produce 0.5 short tons (0.45 t) per month. Groves therefore authorized DuPont to establish heavy water facilities at the Morgantown Ordnance Works, near Morgantown, West Virginia; at the Wabash River Ordnance Works, near Dana and Newport, Indiana; and at the Alabama Ordnance Works, near Childersburg and Sylacauga, Alabama. Although known as Ordnance Works and paid for under Ordnance Department contracts, they were built and operated by the Army Corps of Engineers. The American plants used a process different from Trail's; heavy water was extracted by distillation, taking advantage of the slightly higher boiling point of heavy water.

== Uranium ==
=== Ore ===
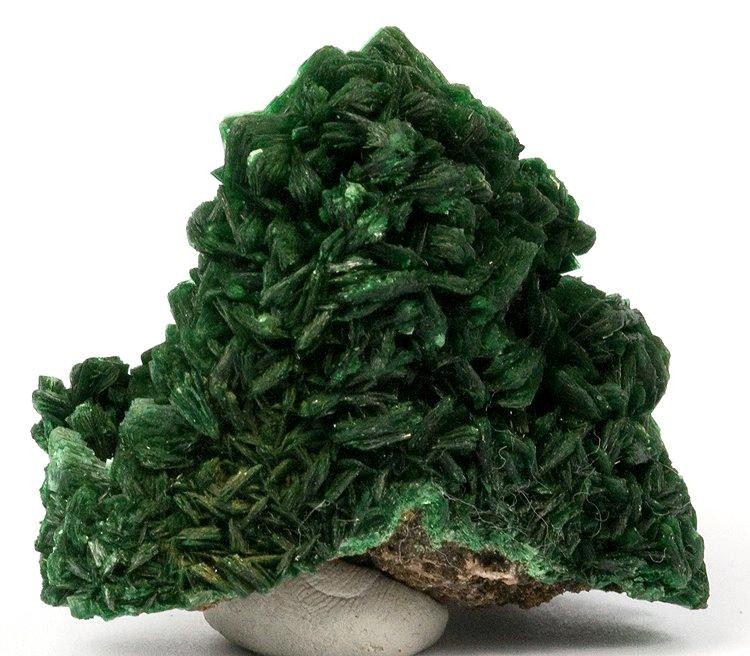
A sample of a high-quality uranium-bearing ore (Tobernite) from the Shinkolobwe mine in Belgian Congo

The key raw material for the project was uranium, which was used as fuel for the reactors, as feed that was transformed into plutonium, and, in its enriched form, in the atomic bomb itself. There were four known major deposits of uranium in 1940: in Colorado, in northern Canada, in Joachimsthal in Czechoslovakia, and in the Belgian Congo. All but Joachimstal were in Allied hands. A 1942 survey determined that sufficient quantities of uranium were available to satisfy the project's requirements. (Note: The original project goal in 1942 was to acquire approximately 1,700 short tons (1,500 t) of uranium ore. By the time of the dissolution of the Manhattan District, it had acquired about 10,000 short tons (9,100 t) of uranium oxides, 72% of which came from the Congolese ores, 14% from the Colorado plateau, and 9% from Canadian ores.) Nichols arranged with the State Department for export controls to be placed on uranium oxide and negotiated for the purchase of 1,200 short tons (1,100 t) of uranium ore from the Belgian Congo that was being stored in a warehouse on Staten Island and the remaining stocks of mined ore stored in the Congo. He negotiated with Eldorado Gold Mines for the purchase of ore from its refinery in Port Hope, Ontario. The Canadian government subsequently bought up the company's stock until it acquired a controlling interest.

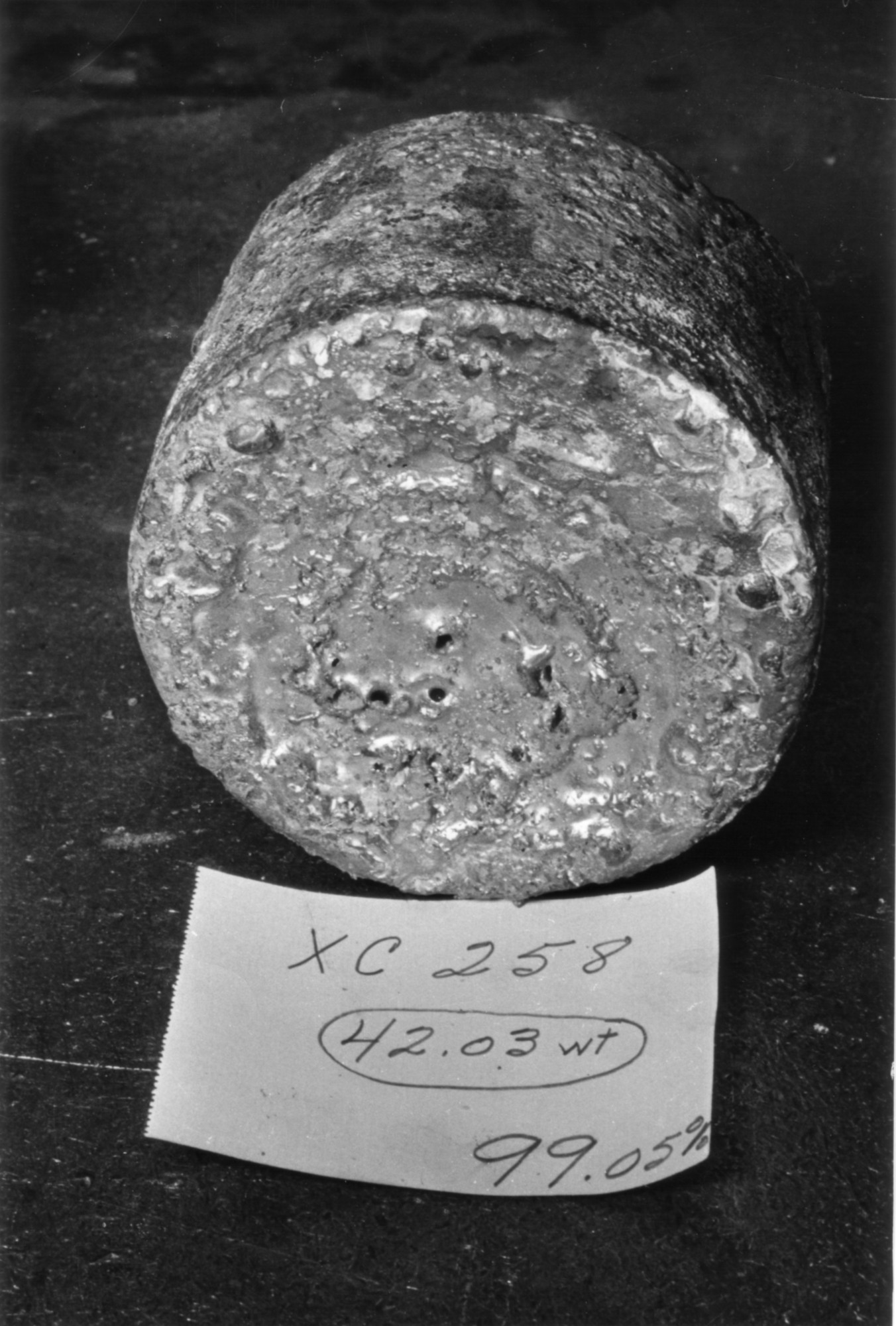
A uranium metal "biscuit" created from the reduction reaction of the Ames process

Of these ores, those from the Belgian Congo contained the most uranium per mass of rock by far. (Note: Much of the mined ore from the Shinkolobwe mine had a uranium oxide content as high as 65% to 75%, which was many times higher than any other global sources. By comparison, the Canadian ores could be as high as 30%, and American sources, many of them byproducts of the mining of other minerals (especially vanadium), contained less than 1% uranium.) Beyond their wartime needs, American and British leaders concluded that it was in their countries' interest to control as much of the world's uranium deposits as possible. The Shinkolobwe mine was flooded and closed, and Nichols unsuccessfully attempted to negotiate its reopening and the sale of the entire future output to the United States with Edgar Sengier, the director of the company that owned the mine, the Union Minière du Haut-Katanga. The matter was then taken up by the Combined Policy Committee. As 30 percent of Union Minière's stock was controlled by British interests, the British took the lead in negotiations. Sir John Anderson and Ambassador John Winant hammered out a deal with Sengier and the Belgian government in May 1944 for the mine to be reopened and 1,720 short tons (1,560 t) of ore to be purchased at $1.45 a pound. To avoid dependence on the British and Canadians for ore, Groves also arranged for the purchase of US Vanadium Corporation's stockpile in Uravan, Colorado.

The raw ore was dissolved in nitric acid to produce uranyl nitrate, which was processed into uranium trioxide, which was reduced to highly pure uranium dioxide. By July 1942, Mallinckrodt was producing a ton of highly pure oxide a day, but turning this into uranium metal initially proved more difficult. Production was too slow and quality was unacceptably low. A branch of the Metallurgical Laboratory was established at Iowa State College in Ames, Iowa, under Frank Spedding to investigate alternatives. This became known as the Ames Project, and its Ames process became available in 1943.

=== Isotope separation ===
Natural uranium consists of 99.3% uranium-238 and 0.7% uranium-235, but as only the latter is fissile it must be physically separated from the more plentiful isotope. Various methods were considered for uranium enrichment, most of which was carried out at Oak Ridge. The most obvious technology, the centrifuge, failed, but electromagnetic separation, gaseous diffusion, and thermal diffusion technologies were all successful and contributed to the project. In February 1943, Groves came up with the idea of using the output of some plants as the input for others.

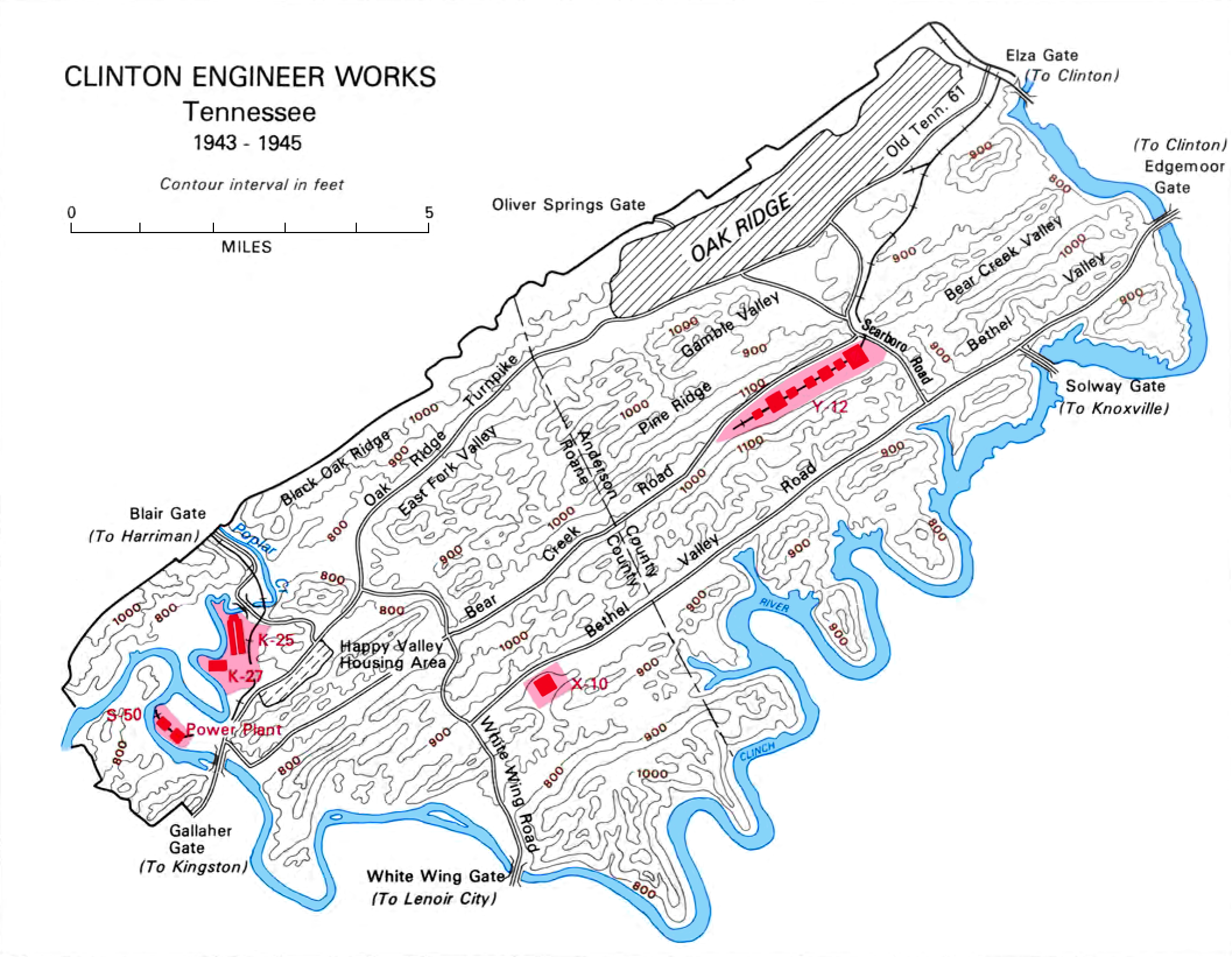
Oak Ridge hosted several uranium separation technologies. The Y-12 electromagnetic separation plant is in the upper right. The K-25 and K-27 gaseous diffusion plants are in the lower left, near the S-50 thermal diffusion plant. The X-10 was for plutonium production.

==== Centrifuges ====
The centrifuge process was regarded as the only promising separation method in April 1942. Jesse Beams had developed such a process in the 1930s, but had encountered technical difficulties. In 1941 he began working with uranium hexafluoride, the only known gaseous compound of uranium, and was able to separate uranium-235. At Columbia, Karl P. Cohen produced a body of mathematical theory making it possible to design a centrifugal separation unit, which Westinghouse undertook to construct.

Scaling this up to a production plant presented a formidable technical challenge. Urey and Cohen estimated that producing a kilogram (2.2 lb) of uranium-235 per day would require up to 50,000 centrifuges with 1-meter (3 ft 3 in) rotors, or 10,000 centrifuges with 4-meter (13 ft) rotors, assuming that 4-meter rotors could be built. The prospect of keeping so many rotors operating continuously at high speed appeared daunting, and when Beams ran his experimental apparatus, he obtained only 60% of the predicted yield, indicating that more centrifuges were required. Beams, Urey and Cohen then began work on a series of improvements which promised to increase efficiency. However, frequent failures of motors, shafts and bearings at high speeds delayed work on the pilot plant.

In November 1942 the centrifuge process was abandoned by the Military Policy Committee. Successful gas centrifuges of the Zippe-type design were instead developed in the Soviet Union after the war. It eventually became the preferred method of uranium isotope separation, being far more economical than the methods that were eventually deployed at scale by the Manhattan Project.

==== Electromagnetic separation ====
Electromagnetic isotope separation was developed at the University of California Radiation Laboratory. This method employed devices known as calutrons. The name was derived from the words California, university and cyclotron. In the electromagnetic process, a magnetic field deflected charged particles according to mass. The process was neither scientifically elegant nor industrially efficient. Compared with a gaseous diffusion plant or a nuclear reactor, an electromagnetic separation plant would consume more scarce materials, require more manpower to operate, and cost more to build. Nonetheless, the process was approved because it was based on proven technology and therefore represented less risk. Moreover, it could be built in stages, and rapidly reach industrial capacity.

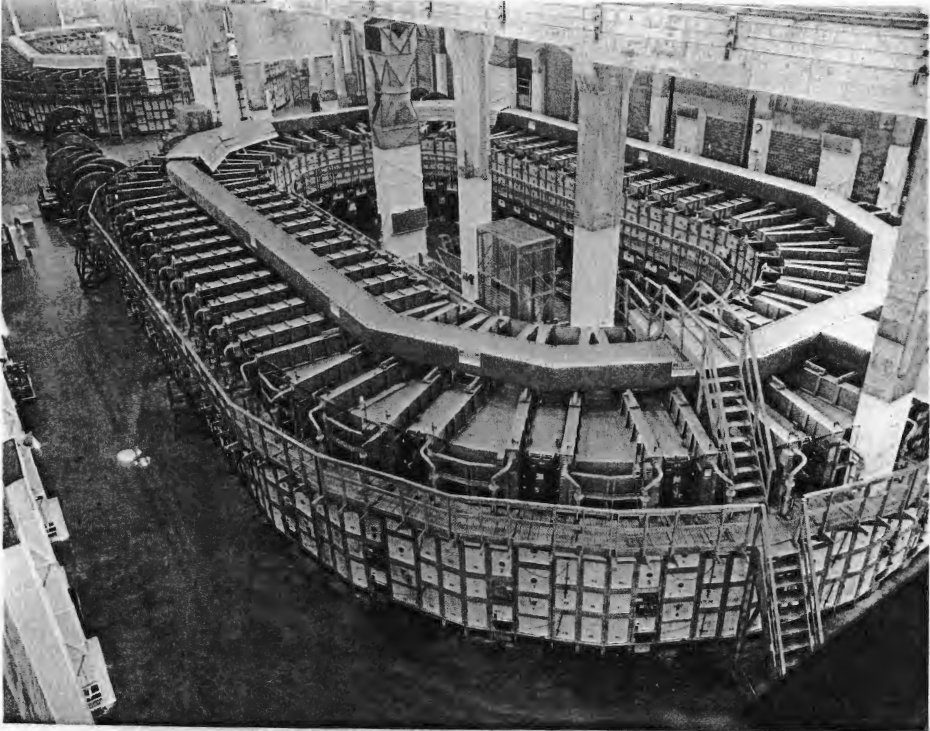
Alpha I racetrack at Y-12

Marshall and Nichols discovered that the electromagnetic isotope separation process would require 5,000 short tons (4,500 tonnes) of copper, which was in desperately short supply. However, silver could be substituted, in an 11:10 copper to silver ratio. On 3 August 1942, Nichols met with Under Secretary of the Treasury Daniel W. Bell and asked for the transfer of 6,000 tons of silver bullion from the West Point Bullion Depository. Ultimately 14,700 short tons (13,300 tonnes; 430,000,000 troy ounces) were used. The 1,000-troy-ounce (31 kg) silver bars were cast into cylindrical billets, extruded into strips, and wound onto magnetic coils.

The Calutron Girls were young women who monitored calutron control panels at Y-12. Gladys Owens, seated in the foreground, was unaware of what she had been involved in.

Responsibility for the design and construction of the electromagnetic separation plant, which came to be called Y-12, was assigned to Stone & Webster in June 1942. The design called for five first-stage processing units, known as Alpha racetracks, and two units for final processing, known as Beta racetracks. In September 1943 Groves authorized construction of four more racetracks, known as Alpha II. Construction began in February 1943. The second Alpha I was operational at the end of January 1944, the first Beta and first and third Alpha I's came online in March, and the fourth Alpha I was operational in April. The four Alpha II racetracks were completed between July and October 1944. Tennessee Eastman was contracted to manage Y-12. The calutrons were turned over to trained Tennessee Eastman operators known as the Calutron Girls.

The calutrons initially enriched the uranium-235 content to between 13% and 15%, and shipped the first few hundred grams of this to Los Alamos in March 1944. Only 1 part in 5,825 of the uranium feed emerged as product. Much of the rest was splattered over equipment in the process. Strenuous recovery efforts helped raise production to 10% of the uranium-235 feed by January 1945. In February the Alpha racetracks began receiving slightly enriched (1.4%) feed from the new S-50 thermal diffusion plant, and the next month they received enhanced (5%) feed from the K-25 gaseous diffusion plant. By August, K-25 was producing uranium sufficiently enriched to feed directly into the Beta tracks.

==== Gaseous diffusion ====
The most promising but also the most challenging method of isotope separation was gaseous diffusion. Graham's law states that the rate of effusion of a gas is inversely proportional to the square root of its molecular mass, so in a box containing a semi-permeable membrane and a mixture of two gases, the lighter molecules will pass out of the container more rapidly than the heavier molecules. The idea was that such boxes could be formed into a cascade of pumps and membranes, with each successive stage containing a slightly more enriched mixture. Research into the process was carried out at Columbia University by a group that included Harold Urey, Karl P. Cohen, and John R. Dunning.

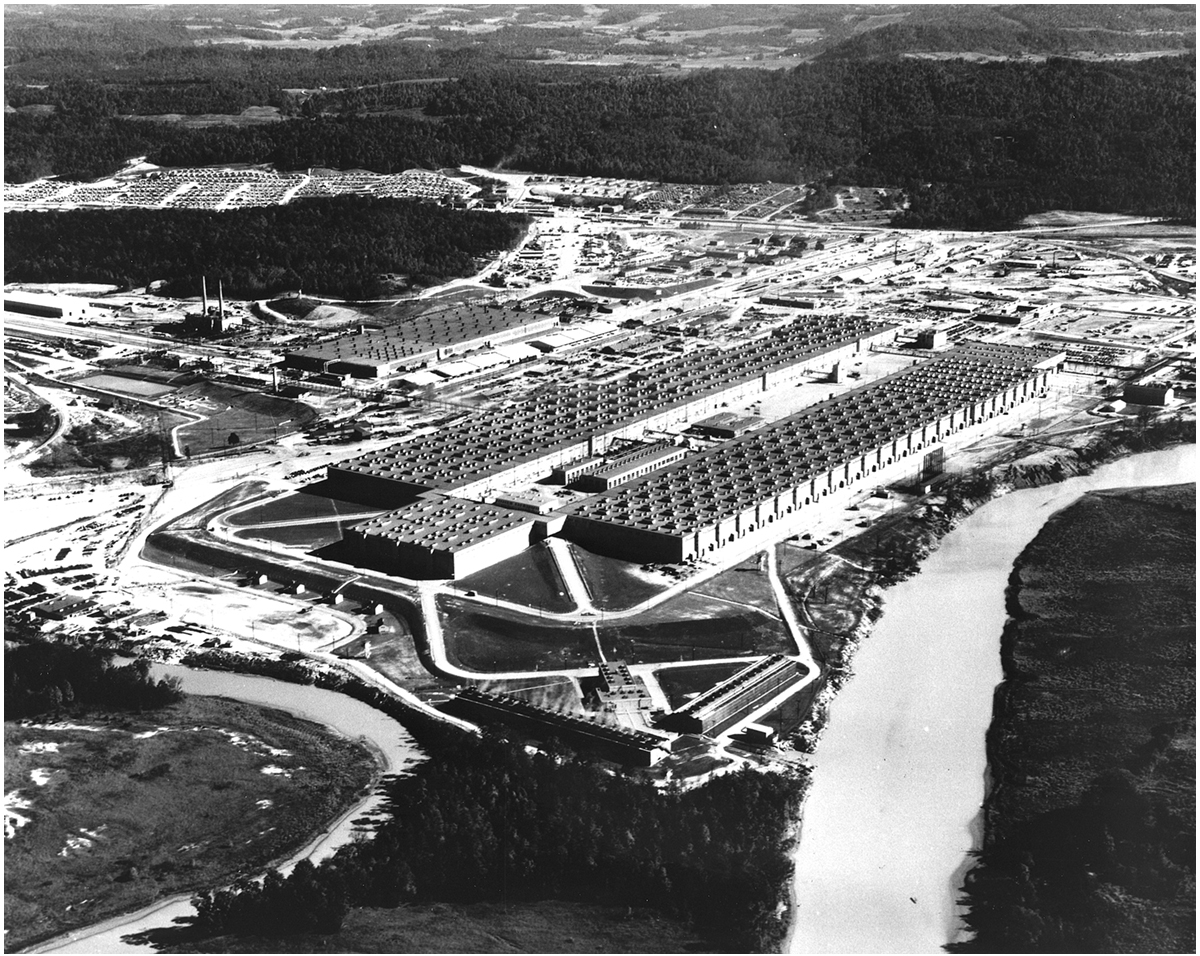
Oak Ridge K-25 plant

In November 1942 the Military Policy Committee approved the construction of a 600-stage gaseous diffusion plant. On 14 December, M. W. Kellogg accepted an offer to construct the plant, which was codenamed K-25. A separate corporate entity called Kellex was created for the project. The process faced formidable technical difficulties. The highly corrosive gas uranium hexafluoride had to be used as no substitute could be found, and the motors and pumps had to be vacuum tight and enclosed in inert gas. The biggest problem was the design of the barrier, which had to be strong, porous and resistant to corrosion. Edward Adler and Edward Norris created a mesh barrier from electroplated nickel. A six-stage pilot plant was built at Columbia to test the process, but the prototype proved to be too brittle. A rival barrier was developed from powdered nickel by Kellex, the Bell Telephone Laboratories and the Bakelite Corporation. In January 1944, Groves ordered the Kellex barrier into production.

Kellex's design for K-25 called for a four-story 0.5-mile (0.80 km) long U-shaped structure containing 54 contiguous buildings. These were divided into nine sections containing cells of six stages. A survey party began construction by marking out the 500-acre (2.0 km^{2}) site in May 1943. Work on the main building began in October 1943, and the six-stage pilot plant was ready for operation on 17 April 1944. In 1945 Groves canceled the upper stages, directing Kellex to instead design and build a 540-stage side feed unit, which became known as K-27. Kellex transferred the last unit to the operating contractor, Union Carbide and Carbon, on 11 September 1945. The total cost, including the K-27 plant completed after the war, came to $480 million.

The production plant commenced operation in February 1945, and as cascade after cascade came online, the quality of the product increased. By April 1945, K-25 had attained a 1.1% enrichment, and the output of the S-50 thermal diffusion plant began being used as feed. Some product produced the next month reached nearly 7% enrichment. In August, the last of the 2,892 stages commenced operation. K-25 and K-27 achieved their full potential in the early postwar period, when they eclipsed the other production plants and became the prototypes for a new generation of plants.

==== Thermal diffusion ====
The thermal diffusion process was based on Sydney Chapman and David Enskog's theory, which explained that when a mixed gas passes through a temperature gradient, the heavier one tends to concentrate at the cold end and the lighter one at the warm end. It was developed by US Navy scientists, but was not one of the enrichment technologies initially selected for use in the Manhattan Project. This was primarily due to doubts about its technical feasibility, but the inter-service rivalry between the Army and Navy also played a part. The Naval Research Laboratory continued the research under Philip Abelson's direction, but there was little contact with the Manhattan Project until April 1944, when Captain William S. Parsons, the naval officer in charge of ordnance development at Los Alamos, brought Oppenheimer news of encouraging progress on thermal diffusion. Oppenheimer informed Groves, who approved construction of a thermal plant on 24 June 1944.

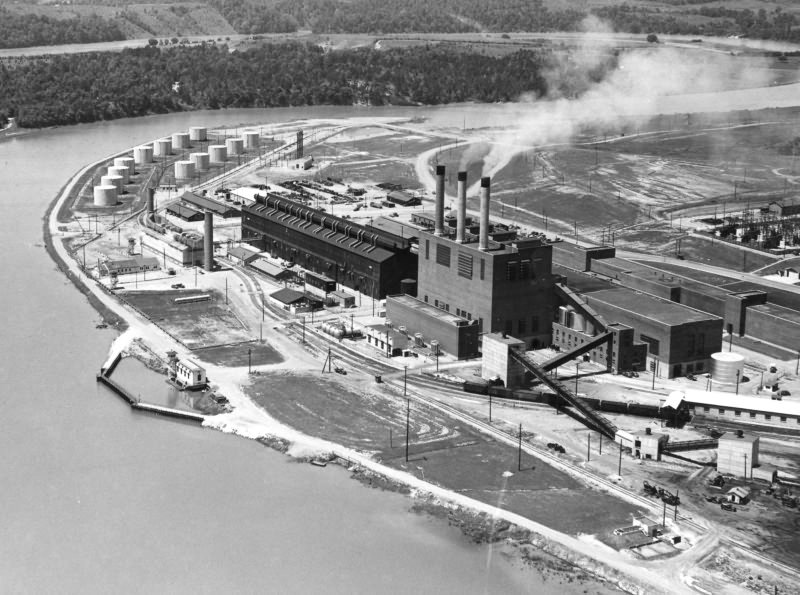
The S-50 plant is the dark building to the upper left behind the Oak Ridge powerhouse (with smokestacks).

Groves contracted with the H. K. Ferguson Company of Cleveland, Ohio, to build the thermal diffusion plant, which was designated S-50. Plans called for the installation of 2,142 48-foot-tall (15 m) diffusion columns arranged in 21 racks. Inside each column were three concentric tubes. Steam, obtained from the nearby K-25 powerhouse (Note: It is necessary to distinguish between the K-25 gaseous diffusion plant and the K-25 power plant. The latter provided energy to both the K-25 gaseous diffusion plant and the S-50 thermal diffusion plant.) at a pressure of 100 pounds per square inch (690 kPa) and temperature of 545 °F (285 °C), flowed downward through the innermost 1.25-inch (32 mm) nickel pipe, while water at 155 °F (68 °C) flowed upward through the outermost iron pipe. The uranium hexafluoride flowed in the middle copper pipe, and isotope separation of the uranium occurred between the nickel and copper pipes. Work commenced on 9 July 1944, and S-50 began partial operation in September. Leaks limited production and forced shutdowns over the next few months, but in June 1945 the S-50 plant produced 12,730 pounds (5,770 kg) of slightly enriched product.

By March 1945, all 21 production racks were operating. Initially the output of S-50 was fed into Y-12, but starting in March 1945 all three enrichment processes were run in series. S-50 became the first stage, enriching the uranium from 0.71% to 0.89% uranium-235. This was then fed into the gaseous diffusion process in the K-25 plant, which produced a product enriched to about 23%. In turn, this was fed into Y-12, which boosted it to about 89%, sufficient for use in nuclear weapons. About 50 kilograms (110 lb) of uranium enriched to 89% was delivered to Los Alamos by July 1945. The entire 50 kg, along with some 50%-enriched, averaging out to about 85% enriched, were used in the first Little Boy bomb.

== Plutonium ==
The second line of development pursued by the Manhattan Project used plutonium. Although small amounts of plutonium exist in nature, the best way to obtain large quantities is via a reactor. Natural uranium is bombarded by neutrons and transmuted into uranium-239, which rapidly decays, first into neptunium-239 and then into plutonium-239. As only a small amount will be transformed, the plutonium must be chemically separated from the remaining uranium, from any initial impurities, and from fission products.

=== X-10 Graphite Reactor ===
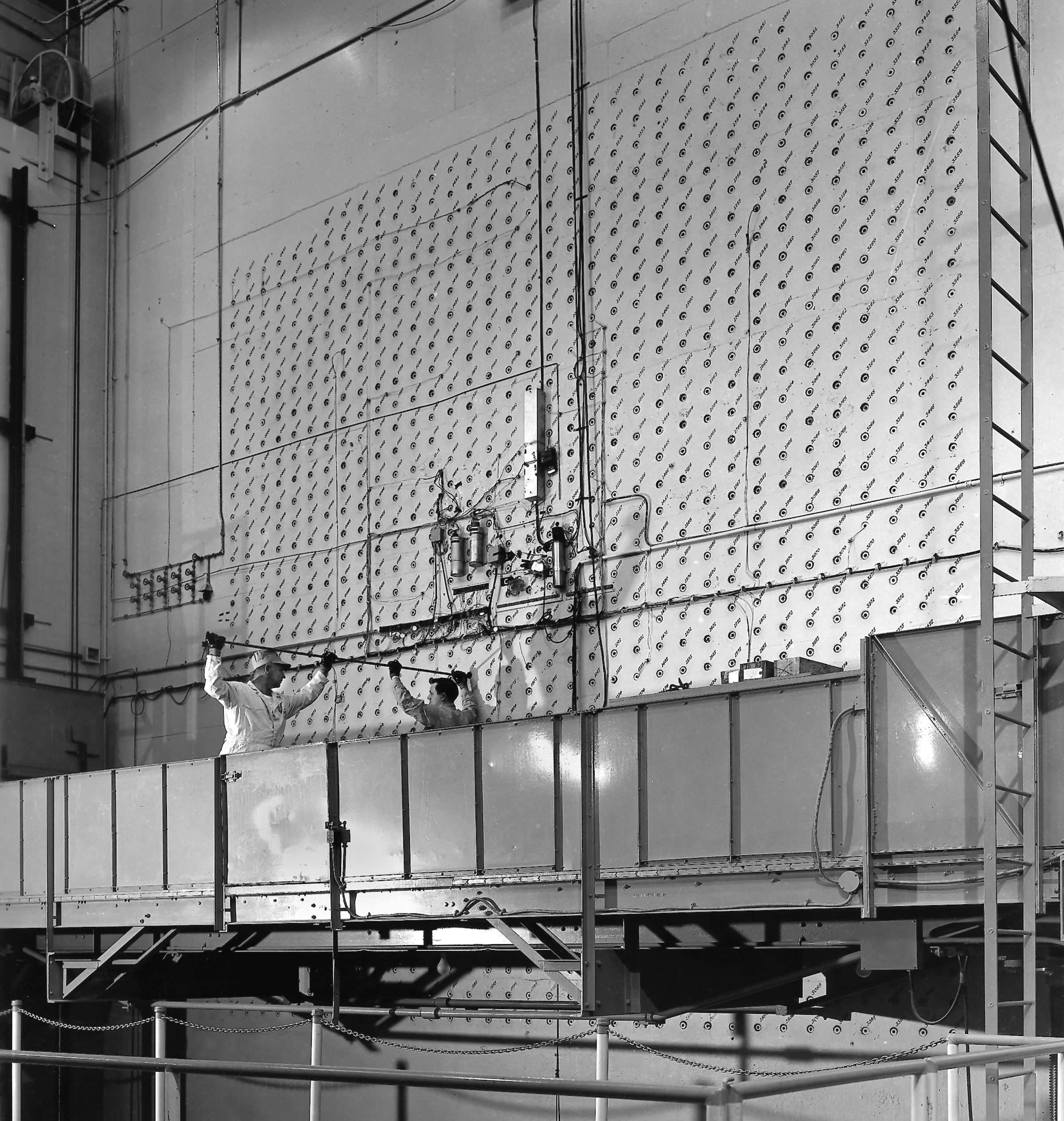
Workers load uranium slugs into the X-10 Graphite Reactor.

In March 1943, DuPont began construction of a plutonium plant on a 112-acre (0.5 km^{2}) site at Oak Ridge. Intended as a pilot plant for the larger production facilities at Hanford, it included the air-cooled X-10 Graphite Reactor, a chemical separation plant, and support facilities. Because of the subsequent decision to construct water-cooled reactors at Hanford, only the chemical separation plant operated as a true pilot. The X-10 Graphite Reactor consisted of a huge block of graphite, 24 feet (7.3 m) per side, weighing around 1,500 short tons (1,400 t), surrounded by 7 feet (2.1 m) of high-density concrete as a radiation shield.

The greatest difficulty was encountered with the uranium slugs produced by Mallinckrodt and Metal Hydrides. These had to be coated in aluminum to avoid corrosion and the escape of fission products into the cooling system. The Grasselli Chemical Company attempted to develop a hot dipping process without success. Alcoa tried canning, developing a new process for flux-less welding; 97% of the cans passed a standard vacuum test, but high temperature tests indicated a failure rate of more than 50%. Nonetheless, production began in June 1943. The Metallurgical Laboratory eventually developed an improved welding technique with the help of General Electric, which was incorporated into the production process in October 1943.

The X-10 Graphite Reactor went critical on 4 November 1943 with about 30 short tons (27 t) of uranium. A week later the load was increased to 36 short tons (33 t), raising its power generation to 500 kW, and by the end of the month the first 500 mg of plutonium was created. Gradual modifications raised the power to 4,000 kW in July 1944. X-10 operated as a production plant until January 1945, when it was turned over to research.

=== Hanford reactors ===
Although an air-cooled design was chosen for the reactor at Oak Ridge to facilitate rapid construction, this was impractical for the much larger production reactors. Initial designs by the Metallurgical Laboratory and DuPont used helium for cooling, before they determined that a water-cooled reactor was simpler, cheaper and quicker to build. The design did not become available until 4 October 1943; in the meantime, Matthias concentrated on improving the Hanford Site by erecting accommodations, improving the roads, building a railway switch line, and upgrading the electricity, water and telephone lines.

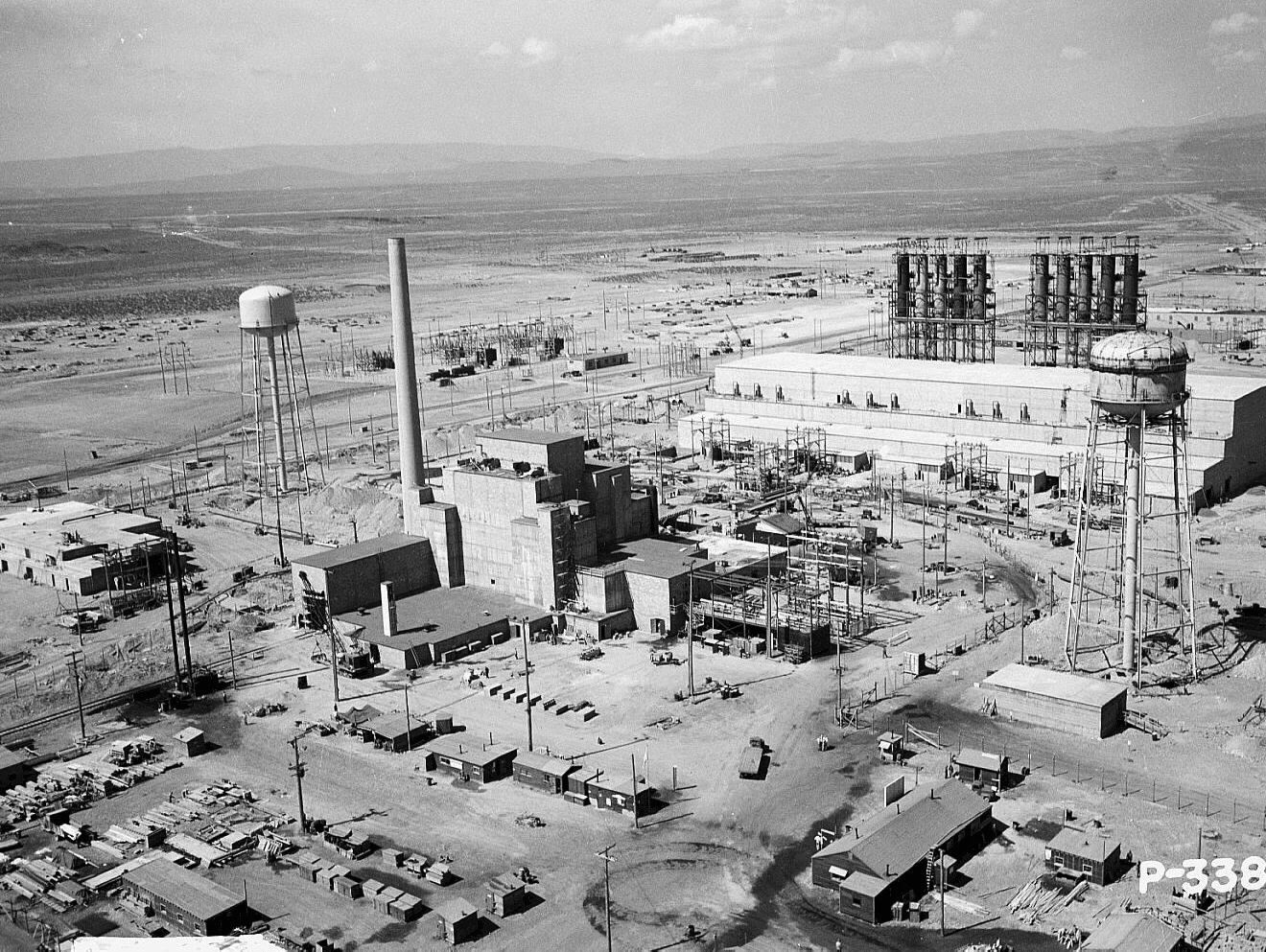
Aerial view of Hanford B-Reactor site, June 1944

As at Oak Ridge, the most difficulty was encountered while canning the uranium slugs, which commenced at Hanford in March 1944. They were pickled to remove dirt and impurities, dipped in molten bronze, tin, and aluminum-silicon alloy, canned using hydraulic presses, and then capped using arc welding under an argon atmosphere. Finally, they were tested to detect holes or faulty welds. Disappointingly, most canned slugs initially failed the tests, resulting in an output of only a handful per day. But steady progress was made and by June 1944 production increased to the point where it appeared that enough canned slugs was available to start Reactor B on schedule in August 1944.

Work began on Reactor B, the first of six planned 250 MW reactors, on 10 October 1943. The reactor complexes were given letter designations A through F, with B, D and F sites developed first, as this maximized the distance between the reactors. They were the only ones constructed during the Manhattan Project. Some 390 short tons (350 t) of steel, 17,400 cubic yards (13,300 m^{3}) of concrete, 50,000 concrete blocks and 71,000 concrete bricks were used to construct the 120-foot (37 m) high building.

Construction of the reactor itself commenced in February 1944. Watched by Compton, Matthias, DuPont's Crawford Greenewalt, Leona Woods and Fermi, who inserted the first slug, the reactor was powered up beginning on 13 September 1944. Over the next few days, 838 tubes were loaded and the reactor went critical. Shortly after midnight on 27 September, the operators began to withdraw the control rods to initiate production. At first all appeared well but around 03:00 the power level started to drop and by 06:30 the reactor had shut down completely. The cooling water was investigated to see if there was a leak or contamination. The next day the reactor started up again, only to shut down once more.

Fermi contacted Chien-Shiung Wu, who identified the cause of the problem as neutron poisoning from xenon-135, which has a half-life of 9.2 hours. Fermi, Woods, Donald J. Hughes and John Archibald Wheeler then calculated the nuclear cross section of xenon-135, which turned out to be 30,000 times that of uranium. DuPont engineer George Graves had deviated from the Metallurgical Laboratory's original design in which the reactor had 1,500 tubes arranged in a circle, and had added an additional 504 tubes to fill in the corners. The scientists had originally considered this overengineering a waste of time and money, but Fermi realized that by loading all 2,004 tubes, the reactor could reach the required power level and efficiently produce plutonium. Reactor D was started on 17 December 1944 and Reactor F on 25 February 1945.

=== Separation process ===
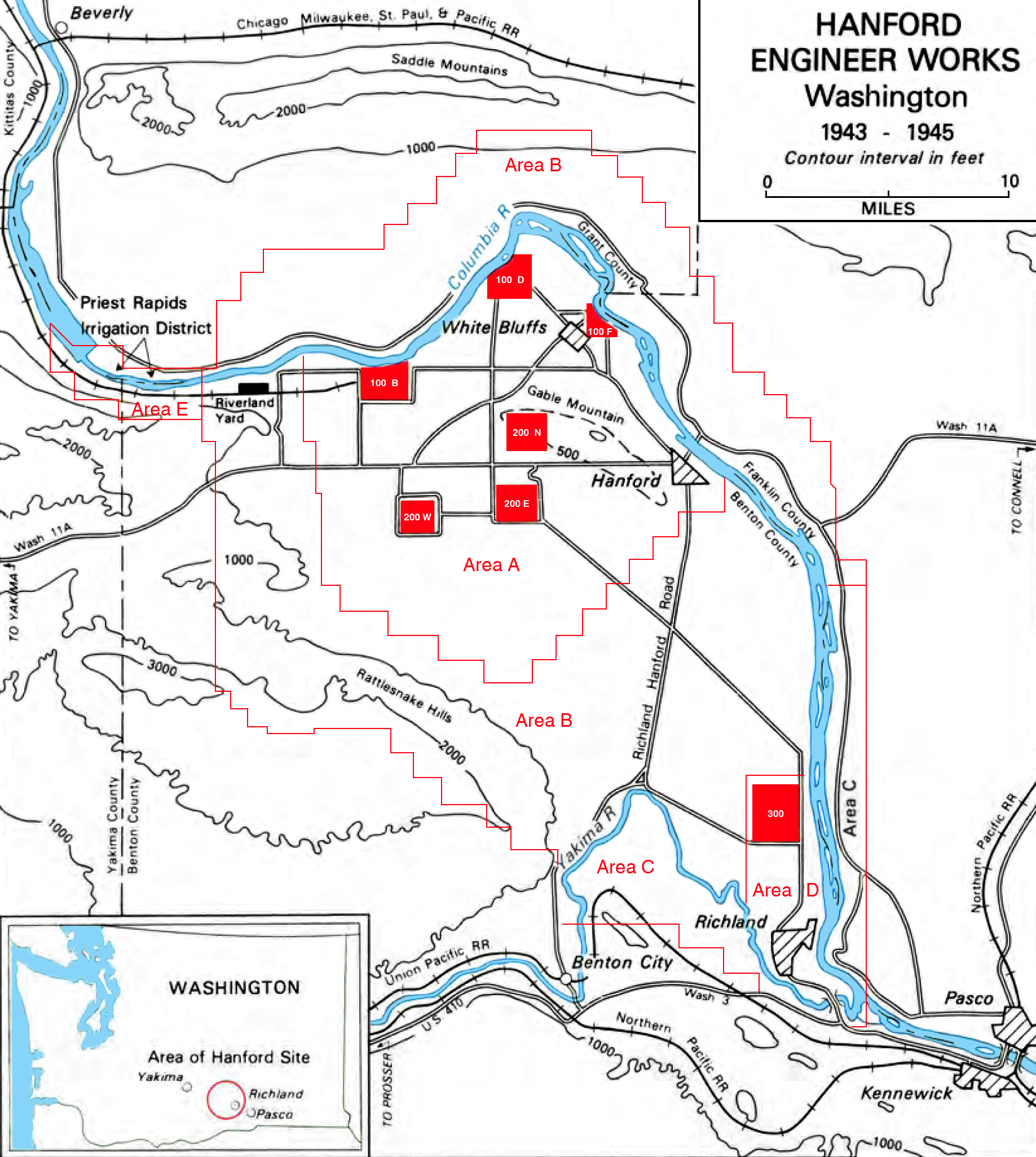
Map of the Hanford Site. Railroads flank the plants to the north and south. Reactors are the three northernmost red squares, along the Columbia River. The separation plants are the lower two red squares from the grouping south of the reactors. The bottom red square is the 300 area.

Meanwhile, the chemists considered how plutonium could be separated from uranium when its chemical properties were not known. Working with the minute quantities of plutonium available at the Metallurgical Laboratory in 1942, a team under Charles M. Cooper developed a lanthanum fluoride process which was chosen for the pilot separation plant. A second separation process, the bismuth phosphate process, was subsequently developed by Seaborg and Stanly G. Thomson. Greenewalt favored the bismuth phosphate process due to the corrosive nature of lanthanum fluoride, and it was selected for the Hanford separation plants. Once X-10 began producing plutonium, the pilot separation plant was put to the test. The first batch was processed at 40% efficiency but over the next few months this was raised to 90%.

At Hanford, top priority was initially given to the installations in the 300 area: buildings for testing materials, preparing uranium, and assembling and calibrating instrumentation. One of the buildings housed the canning equipment for the uranium slugs, while another contained a small test reactor. Notwithstanding its priority, work on the 300 area fell behind schedule due to the unique and complex nature of the facilities, and wartime shortages of labor and materials.

Early plans called for the construction of two separation plants in each of the areas known as 200-West and 200-East. This was subsequently reduced to two, the T and U plants, in 200-West and one, the B plant, at 200-East. Each separation plant consisted of four buildings: a process cell building or "canyon" (known as 221), a concentration building (224), a purification building (231) and a magazine store (213). The canyons were each 800 feet (240 m) long and 65 feet (20 m) wide. Each consisted of forty 17.7-by-13-by-20-foot (5.4 by 4.0 by 6.1 m) cells.

Work began on 221-T and 221-U in January 1944, with the former completed in September and the latter in December. The 221-B building followed in March 1945. Because of the high levels of radioactivity involved, work in the separation plants had to be conducted by remote control using closed-circuit television, something unheard of in 1943. Maintenance was carried out with the aid of an overhead crane and specially designed tools. The 224 buildings were smaller because they had less material to process, and it was less radioactive. The 224-T and 224-U buildings were completed on 8 October 1944, and 224-B followed on 10 February 1945. The purification methods that were eventually used in 231-W were still unknown when construction commenced on 8 April 1944, but the plant was complete and the methods were selected by the end of the year. On 5 February 1945, Matthias hand-delivered the first shipment of 80 g of 95%-pure plutonium nitrate to a Los Alamos courier in Los Angeles.

=== Weapon design ===
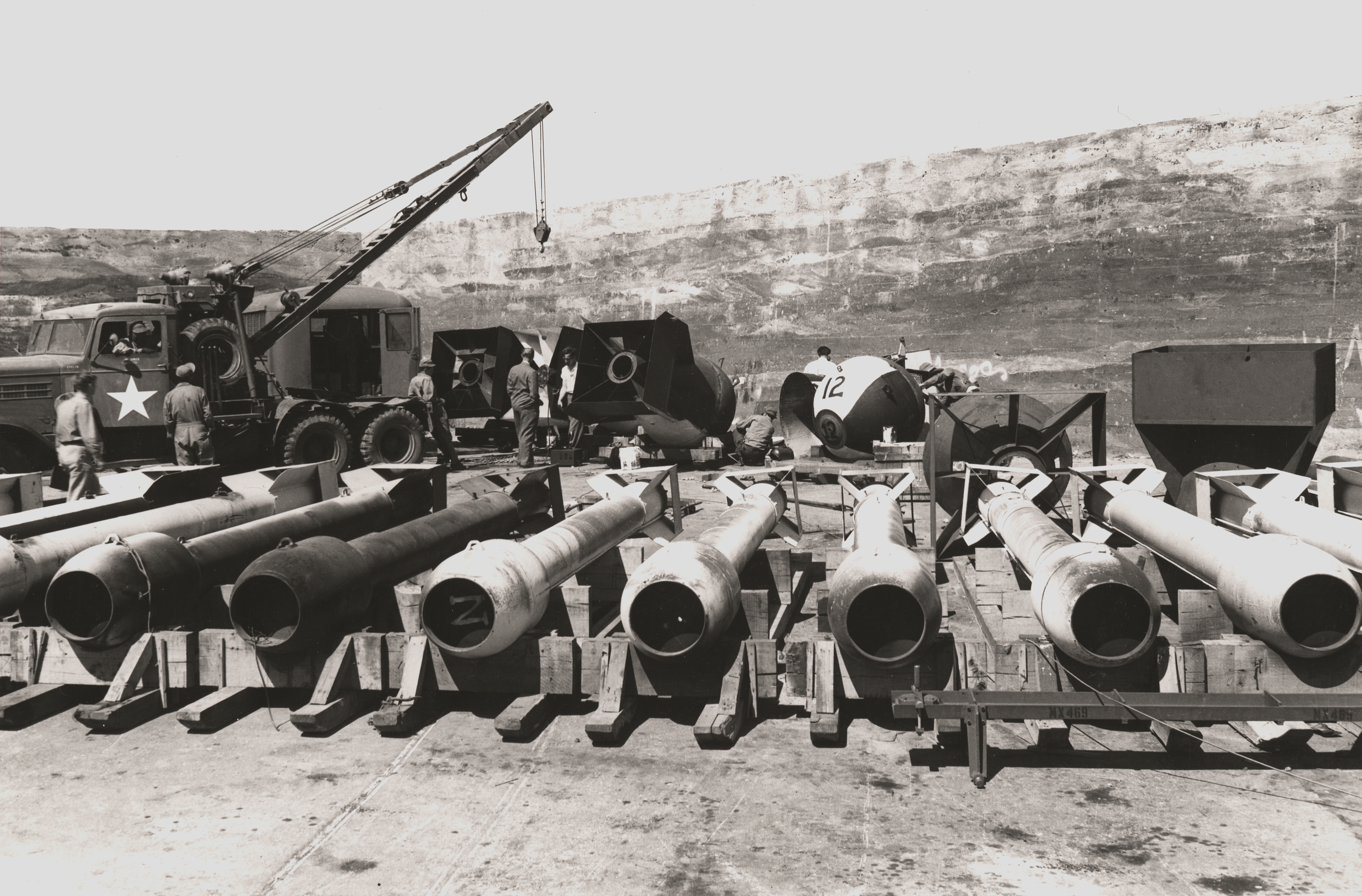
A row of Thin Man casings. Fat Man casings are visible in the background.

In 1943, development efforts were directed to a gun-type fission weapon with plutonium called Thin Man. Initial research on the properties of plutonium was done using cyclotron-generated plutonium-239, which was extremely pure but could only be created in very small amounts. Los Alamos received the first sample of plutonium from the Clinton X-10 reactor in April 1944 and within days Emilio Segrè discovered a problem: the reactor-bred plutonium had a higher concentration of plutonium-240, resulting in up to five times the spontaneous fission rate of cyclotron plutonium.

This rendered it unsuitable for use in a gun-type weapon, for the plutonium-240 would start the chain reaction too soon, causing a predetonation that would disperse the critical mass after a minimal amount of plutonium had fissioned (a fizzle). A higher-velocity gun was suggested but found to be impractical. The possibility of separating the isotopes was also considered and rejected, as plutonium-240 is even harder to separate from plutonium-239 than uranium-235 from uranium-238, and attempting it "would postpone the weapon indefinitely".

Work on an alternative method of bomb design, known as implosion, had begun earlier under the direction of the physicist Seth Neddermeyer. Implosion used explosives to crush a subcritical sphere of fissile material into a smaller and denser form. The critical mass is assembled in much less time than with the gun method. When the fissile atoms are packed closer together, the rate of neutron capture increases, so it also makes more efficient use of fissionable material. Neddermeyer's 1943 and early 1944 investigations showed promise, but also made it clear that an implosion weapon was more complex than the gun-type design from both a theoretical and an engineering perspective. In September 1943, John von Neumann, who had experience with shaped charges, proposed using a spherical configuration instead of the cylindrical one that Neddermeyer was working on.

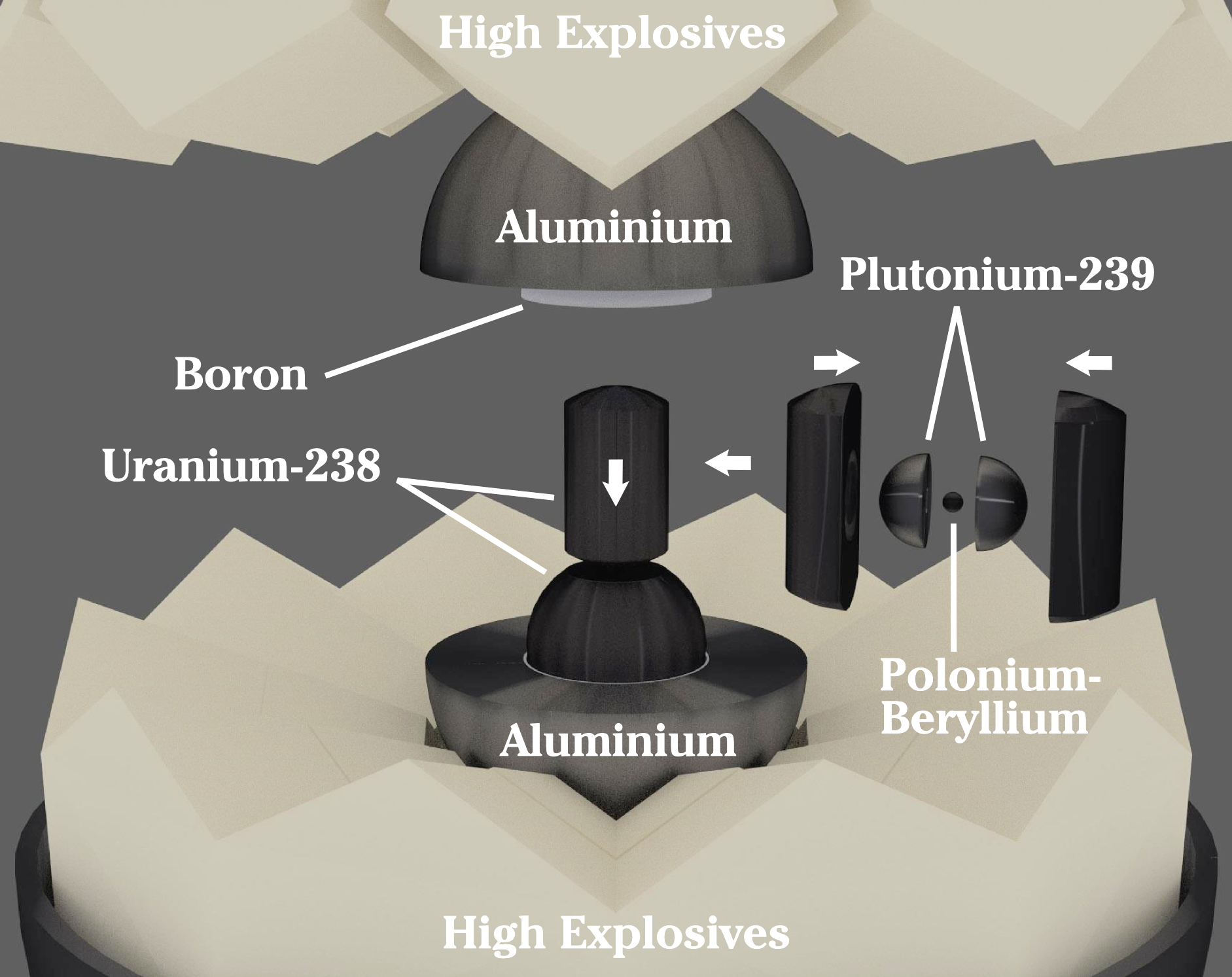
An implosion-type nuclear bomb

An accelerated effort on the implosion design, codenamed Fat Man, began in August 1944 when Oppenheimer implemented a sweeping reorganization of the Los Alamos laboratory to focus on implosion. Two new groups were created at Los Alamos to develop the implosion weapon, X (for explosives) Division headed by explosives expert George Kistiakowsky and G (for gadget) Division under Robert Bacher. The new design featured explosive lenses that focused the implosion into a spherical shape. The design of lenses turned out to be slow, difficult and frustrating. Various explosives were tested before settling on composition B and baratol. The final design resembled a soccer ball, with 20 hexagonal and 12 pentagonal lenses, each weighing about 80 pounds (36 kg). Getting the detonation just right required fast, reliable and safe electrical detonators, of which there were two for each lens for reliability. They used exploding-bridgewire detonators, a new invention developed at Los Alamos by a group led by Luis Alvarez.

To study the behavior of converging shock waves, Robert Serber devised the RaLa Experiment, which used the short-lived radioisotope lanthanum-140, a potent source of gamma radiation. The gamma ray source was placed in the center of a metal sphere surrounded by the explosive lenses, which in turn were inside in an ionization chamber. This allowed the taking of an X-ray movie of the implosion. The lenses were designed primarily using this series of tests. In his history of the Los Alamos project, David Hawkins wrote: "RaLa became the most important single experiment affecting the final bomb design".

Within the explosives was an aluminum pusher, which provided a smooth transition from the relatively low-density explosive to the next layer, the tamper of natural uranium. Its main job was to hold the critical mass together as long as possible, but it would also reflect neutrons into the core and some of its uranium would fission. To prevent predetonation by an external neutron, the tamper was coated in a thin layer of neutron-absorbing boron. A polonium-beryllium modulated neutron initiator, known as an "urchin", was developed to start the chain reaction at precisely the right moment. This work on the chemistry and metallurgy of radioactive polonium was directed by Charles Allen Thomas of the Monsanto Company and became known as the Dayton Project. Testing required up to 500 curies per month of polonium, which Monsanto was able to deliver. The whole assembly was encased in a duralumin bomb casing to protect it from bullets and flak.

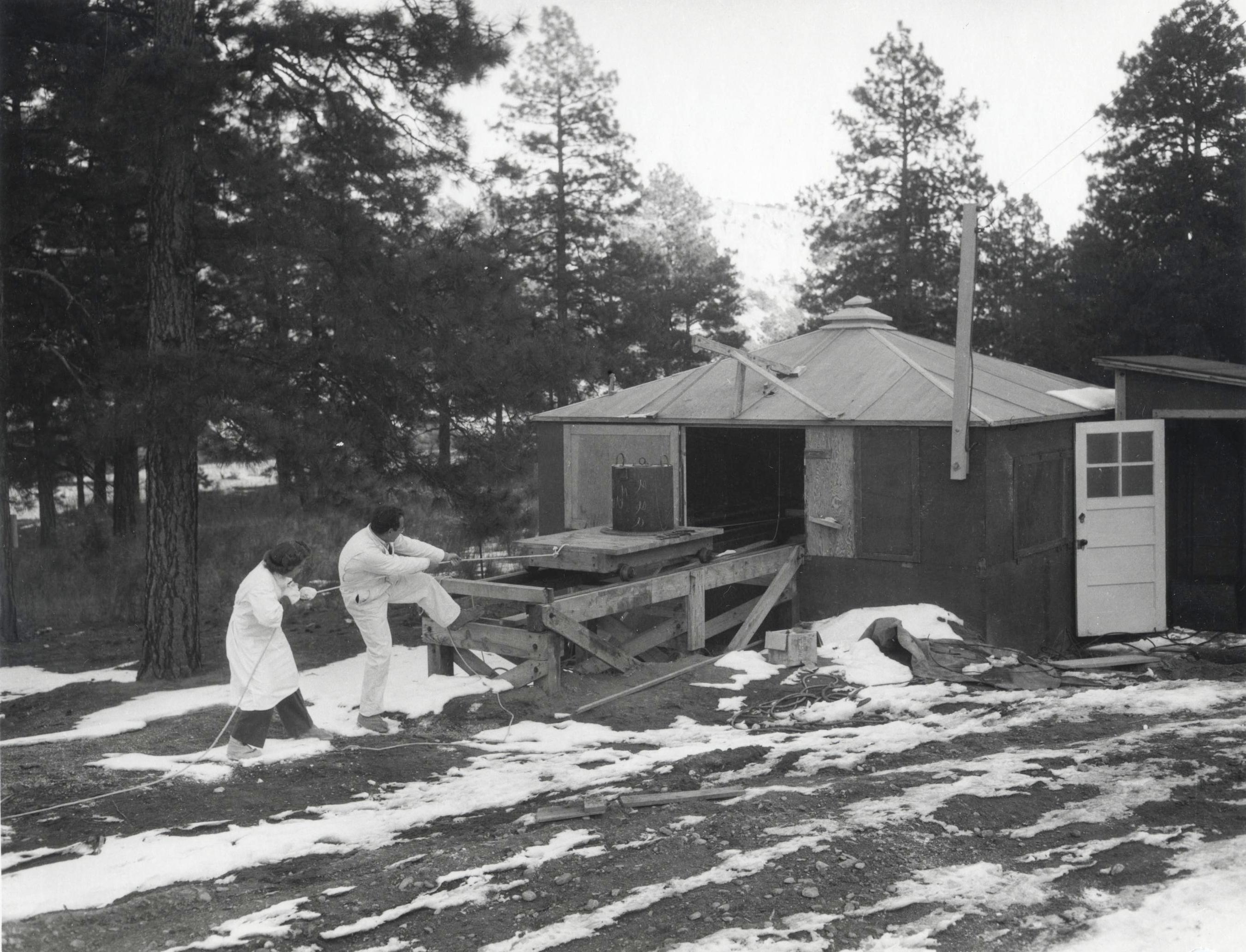
Remote handling of a kilocurie source of radiolanthanum for a RaLa Experiment at Los Alamos

The ultimate task of the metallurgists was to determine how to cast plutonium into a sphere. The difficulties became apparent when attempts to measure the density of plutonium gave inconsistent results. At first contamination was suspected, but it was soon determined that there were multiple allotropes of plutonium. The brittle α phase that exists at room temperature changes to the plastic β phase at higher temperatures. Attention then shifted to the even more malleable δ phase that normally exists in the 300 °C to 450 °C range. It was found that this was stable at room temperature when alloyed with aluminum, but aluminum emits neutrons when bombarded with alpha particles, which would exacerbate the pre-ignition problem. The metallurgists then hit upon using a plutonium-gallium alloy, which stabilized the δ phase and could be hot pressed into the desired spherical shape. As plutonium was found to corrode readily, the sphere was coated with nickel.

The work proved dangerous. By the end of the war, half the chemists and metallurgists had to be removed from work with plutonium when unacceptably high levels of the element was detected in their urine. A minor fire at Los Alamos in January 1945 led to a fear that a fire in the plutonium laboratory might contaminate the whole town, and Groves authorized the construction of a new facility for plutonium chemistry and metallurgy, which became known as the DP-site. The hemispheres for the first plutonium pit (or core) were produced and delivered on 2 July 1945. Three more hemispheres followed on 23 July and were delivered three days later.

In contrast to the plutonium Fat Man, the uranium gun-type Little Boy weapon was straightforward if not trivial to design. Overall responsibility for it was assigned to Parsons's Ordnance (O) Division, with the design, development, and technical work at Los Alamos consolidated under Lieutenant Commander Francis Birch's group. The gun-type design now had to work with enriched uranium only, and this allowed the design to be greatly simplified. A high-velocity gun was no longer required, and a simpler weapon was substituted.

Research into the Super was also pursued, although it was considered secondary to the development of a fission bomb. The effort was directed by Teller, who was its most enthusiastic proponent. The F-1 (Super) Group calculated that burning 1 cubic meter (35 cu ft) of liquid deuterium would release the energy of 10 megatonnes of TNT (42 PJ), enough to devastate 1,000 square miles (2,600 km^{2}). In a final report on the Super in June 1946, Teller remained upbeat about the prospect of it being successfully developed, although that opinion was not universal.

=== Trinity ===
Because of the complexity of an implosion-style weapon, it was decided that, despite the waste of fissile material, a full-scale nuclear test was required. Oppenheimer codenamed it "Trinity". In March 1944, planning for the test was assigned to Kenneth Bainbridge, who selected the Alamogordo Bombing Range for the test site. A base camp was constructed with barracks, warehouses, workshops, an explosive magazine and a commissary. A pre-test explosion was conducted on 7 May 1945 to calibrate the instruments. A wooden test platform was erected 800 yards (730 m) from future Trinity Ground Zero and piled with about 100 short tons (91 t) of high explosives (Note: The charge consisted of 89.75 short tons (81.42 t) tons of TNT and 14.91 short tons (13.53 t) tons of Composition B (with the total explosive power of approximately 108 tons of TNT), actually a few tons more than the stated "100-tons".) spiked with nuclear fission products.

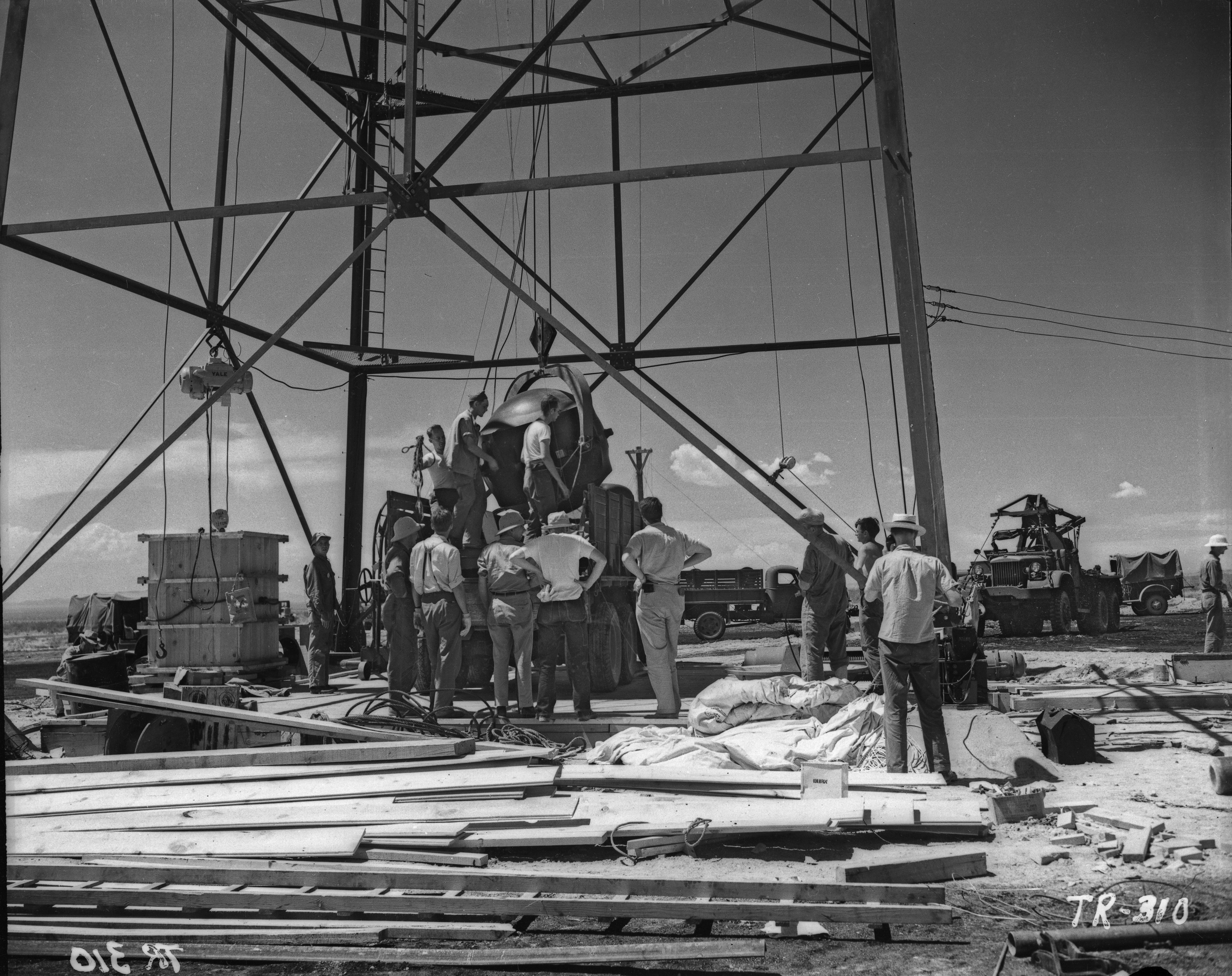
The explosives of "the gadget" were raised to the top of the tower for the final assembly.

Groves did not relish the prospect of explaining to a Senate committee the loss of a billion dollars' worth of plutonium, so a cylindrical containment vessel codenamed "Jumbo" was constructed to recover the active material in the event of a failure. It was fabricated at great expense from 214 short tons (194 t) of iron and steel. By the time it arrived, however, confidence in the implosion method was high enough, and the availability of plutonium was sufficient, that Oppenheimer decided not to use it. Instead, it was placed atop a steel tower 800 yards (730 m) from the weapon as a rough measure of the explosion's power. Jumbo survived, although its tower did not, adding credence to the belief that Jumbo would have successfully contained a fizzled explosion.

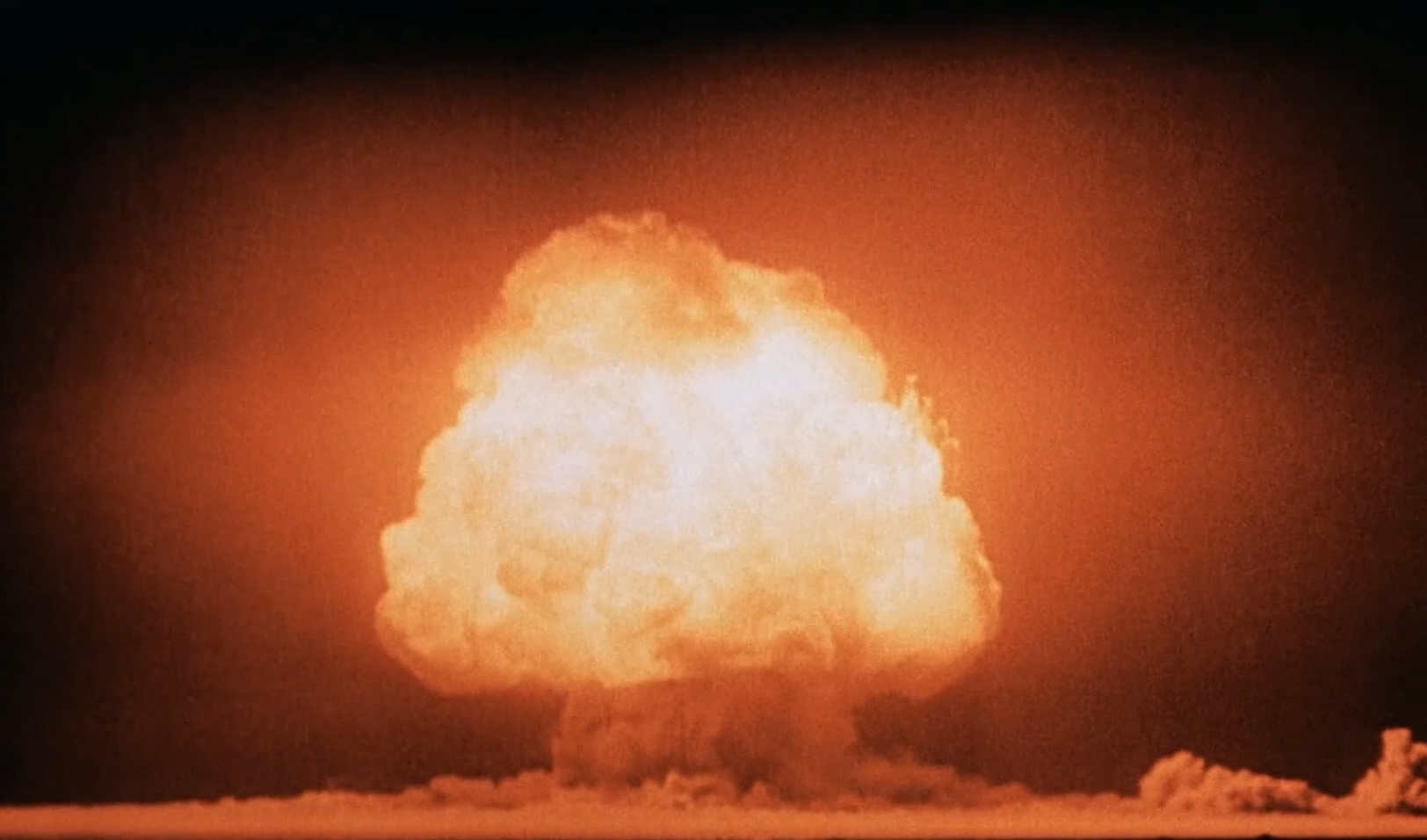
The Trinity test of the Manhattan Project was the first detonation of a nuclear weapon.

For the actual test, the weapon, nicknamed "the gadget", was hoisted to the top of a 100-foot (30 m) steel tower, as detonation at that height would give a better indication of how the weapon would behave when dropped from a bomber. Detonation in the air maximized the energy applied directly to the target and generated less nuclear fallout. The gadget was assembled under the supervision of Norris Bradbury at the nearby McDonald Ranch House on 13 July, and precariously winched up the tower the following day.

At 05:30 on 16 July 1945 the gadget exploded with an energy equivalent of around 20 kilotons of TNT, leaving a crater of trinitite (radioactive glass) in the desert 250 feet (76 m) wide. The shock wave was felt over 100 miles (160 km) away, and the mushroom cloud reached 7.5 miles (12.1 km) in height. It was heard as far away as El Paso, Texas, so Groves issued a cover story about an ammunition magazine explosion at Alamogordo Field involving gas shells.

Oppenheimer later claimed that, while witnessing the explosion, he thought of a verse from the Hindu holy book, the Bhagavad Gita (XI,12):

कालोऽस्मि लोकक्षयकृत्प्रवृद्धो लोकान्समाहर्तुमिह प्रवृत्तः। ऋतेऽपि त्वां न भविष्यन्ति सर्वे येऽवस्थिताः प्रत्यनीकेषु योधाः॥११- ३२॥

Translation:

If the radiance of a thousand suns were to burst at once into the sky, that would be like the splendor of the mighty one ...

together with verse (XI,32), which he translated as "Now I am become Death, destroyer of worlds". (Note: The first instance in print of Oppenheimer's Gita story is apparently from 1948. Oppenheimer at times translated it to "shatterer of worlds" as well. The quote with "destroyer of worlds" comes from a taped interview of Oppenheimer did with NBC in 1965. Oppenheimer's translation is not considered a standard or literal one, and was likely influenced by the style of his Sanskrit teacher, Arthur Ryder, who translated the line as: "Death am I, and my present task / Destruction." A more common translation has the identification not as "Death," but as "Time." In the passage, the Hindu god Krishna is revealing himself and his true form to Prince Arjuna, imploring Arjuna to fulfill his duty and take part in a war, and assuring him that the fate of those killed is really up to Krishna, not mortal men.)

The test was significantly more successful than had been anticipated; this was immediately cabled to Stimson, who was then at the Potsdam Conference, and Groves hastily prepared a lengthier report sent via courier. President Harry S. Truman was powerfully and positively affected by the news. Stimson noted in his diary that when he shared it with Churchill, Churchill remarked: "Now I know what happened to Truman yesterday. I couldn't understand it. When he got to the meeting after having read this report, he was a changed man. He told the Russians just where they got on and off and generally bossed the whole meeting."

== Personnel ==
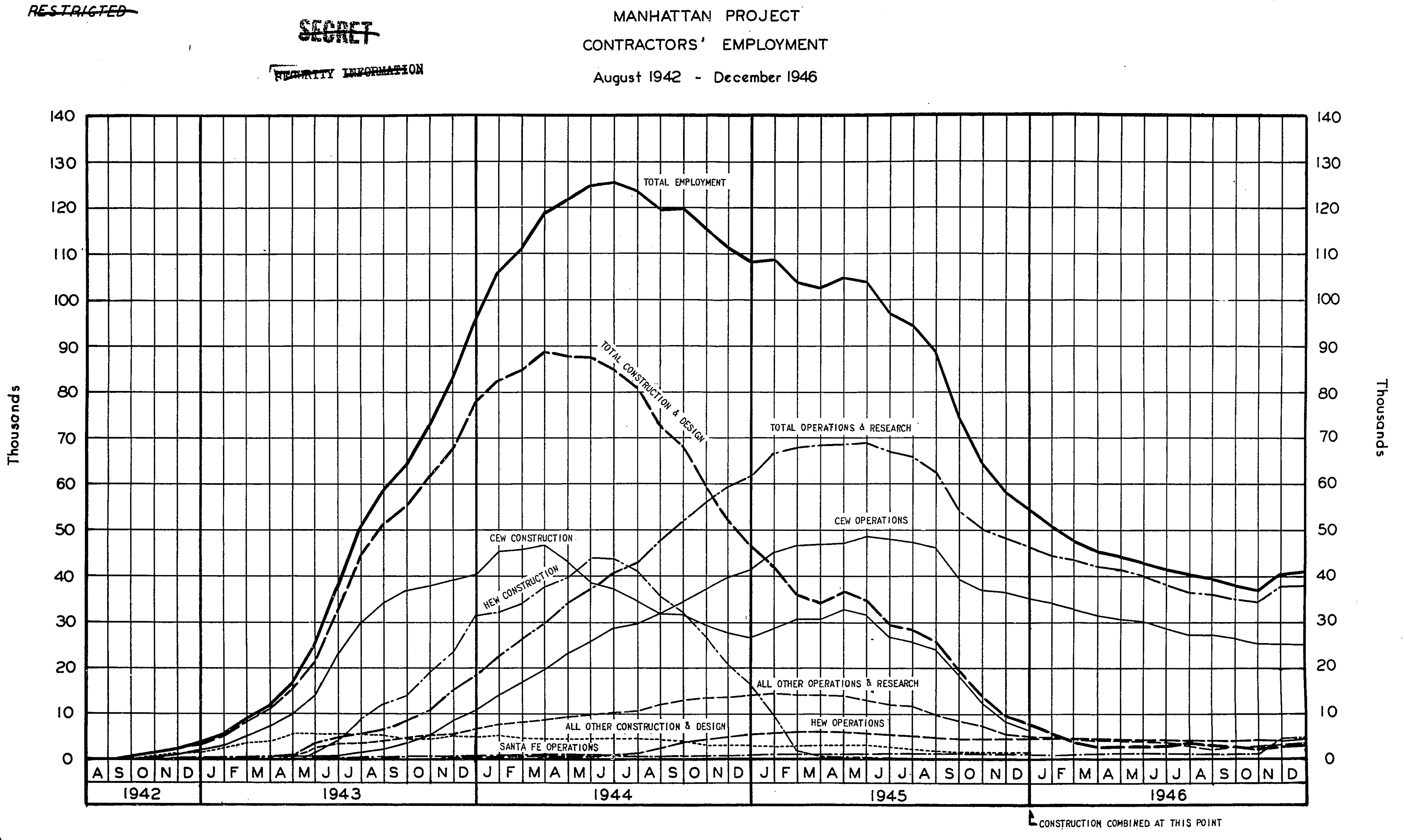
Manhattan Project contractors' employment, August 1942-December 1946

At its peak in June 1944, the Manhattan Project employed about 129,000 workers, of whom 84,500 were construction workers, 40,500 were plant operators and 1,800 were military personnel. As construction activity declined, the workforce fell to 100,000 a year later, but the number of military personnel increased to 5,600. Procuring the required numbers of workers, especially highly skilled workers, in competition with other vital wartime programs proved very difficult. Due to high turnover, over 500,000 people worked on the project. Most African Americans were employed in low-level jobs, but there were a few African-American scientists and technicians. The unique labor and security requirements also resulted in the Manhattan Project having a higher percentage of women in technical roles than later government projects.

In 1943, Groves obtained a special temporary priority for labor from the War Manpower Commission. In March 1944, both the War Production Board and the War Manpower Commission gave the project their highest priority. The Kansas commission director stated that from April to July 1944 every qualified applicant in the state who visited a United States Employment Service office was urged to work at the Hanford Site. No other job was offered until the applicant definitively rejected the offer. Tolman and Conant, in their role as the project's scientific advisers, drew up a list of candidate scientists and had them rated by scientists already working on the project. Groves then sent a personal letter to the head of their university or company asking for them to be released for essential war work.

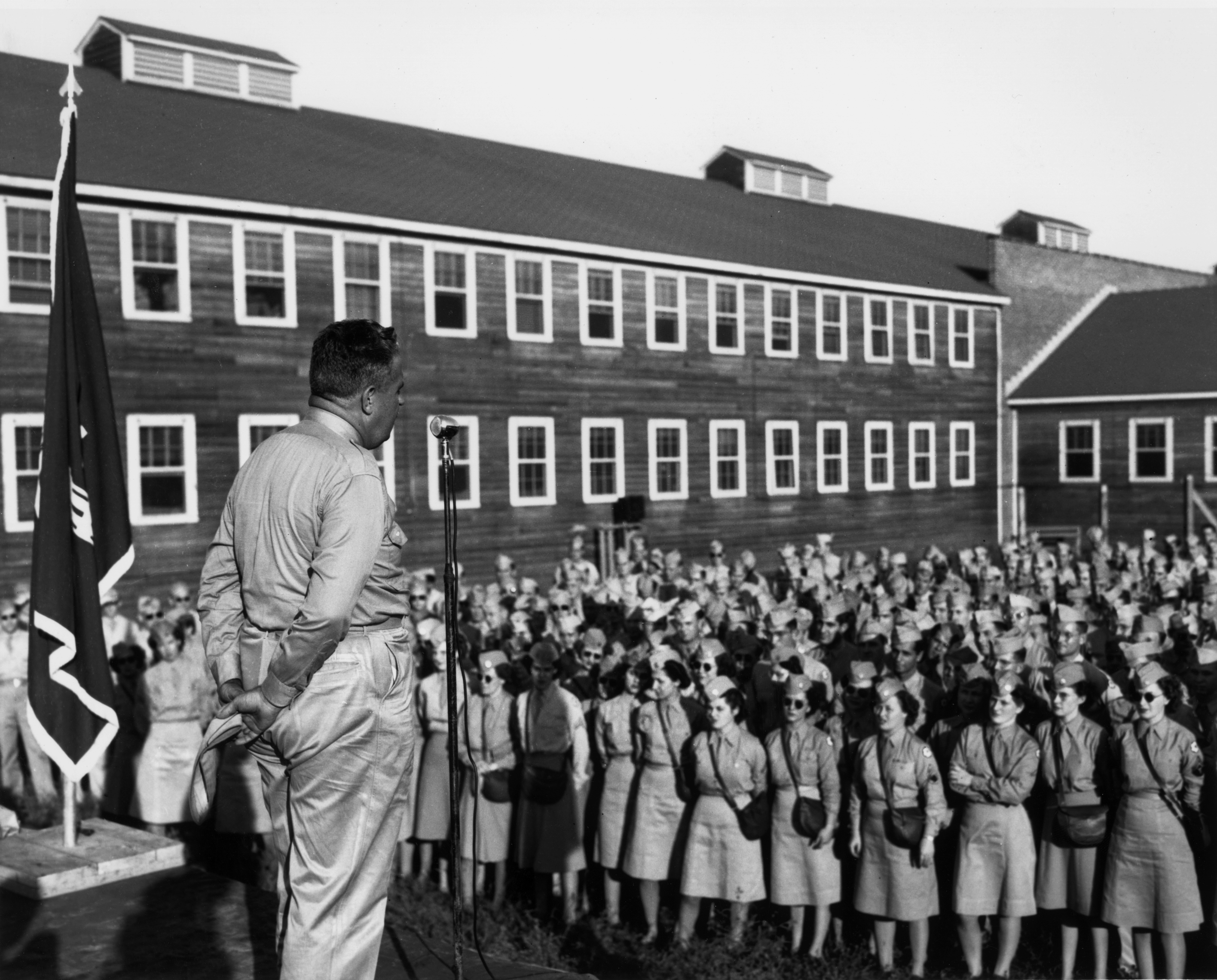
Major General Leslie R. Groves Jr., speaks to service personnel Oak Ridge Tennessee in August 1945.

One source of skilled personnel was the Army itself, particularly the Army Specialized Training Program. In 1943, the MED created the Special Engineer Detachment (SED), with an authorized strength of 675. Technicians and skilled workers drafted into the Army were assigned to the SED. Another source was the Women's Army Corps (WAC). Initially intended for clerical tasks handling classified material, the WACs were soon tapped for technical and scientific tasks as well. On 1 February 1945, all military personnel assigned to the MED, including all SED detachments, were assigned to the 9812th Technical Service Unit, except at Los Alamos, where military personnel other than SED, including the WACs and Military Police, were assigned to the 4817th Service Command Unit.

An associate professor of Radiology at the University of Rochester School of Medicine, Stafford L. Warren, was commissioned as a colonel in the United States Army Medical Corps, and appointed as chief of the MED's Medical Section and Groves' medical advisor. Warren's initial task was to staff hospitals at Oak Ridge, Richland and Los Alamos. The Medical Section was responsible for medical research, but also for the MED's health and safety programs. This presented an enormous challenge, because workers were handling a variety of toxic chemicals, using hazardous liquids and gases under high pressures, working with high voltages, and performing experiments involving explosives, not to mention the largely unknown dangers presented by radioactivity and handling fissile materials. Yet in December 1945, the National Safety Council presented the Manhattan Project with the Award of Honor for Distinguished Service to Safety in recognition of its safety record. Between January 1943 and June 1945, there were 62 fatalities and 3,879 disabling injuries—about 62 percent below the rate of private industry.

== Secrecy ==
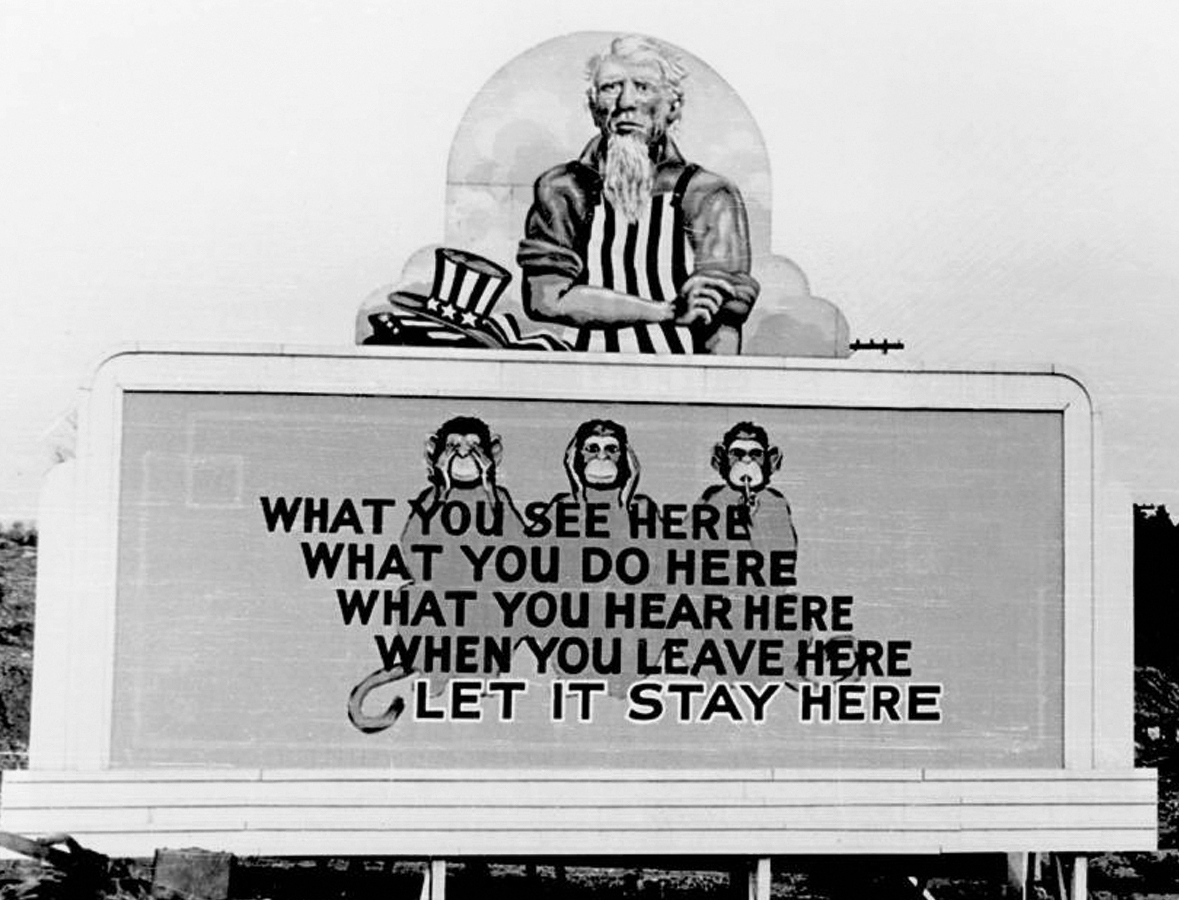
A billboard encouraging secrecy among Oak Ridge workers

The Manhattan Project operated under a mandate of "absolute secrecy" from Roosevelt, meaning that the very existence of the project itself was to be kept secret. This proved a daunting task given the amount of knowledge and speculation about nuclear fission that existed prior to the Manhattan Project, the huge numbers of people involved, and the scale of the facilities. Groves adopted an extreme version of compartmentalization (the need-to-know policy):

Compartmentalization of knowledge, to me, was the very heart of security. My rule was simple and not capable of misinterpretation—each man should know everything he needed to know to do his job and nothing else. Adherence to this rule not only provided an adequate measure of security, but it greatly improved over-all efficiency by making our people stick to their knitting. And it made quite clear to all concerned that the project existed to produce a specific end product—not to enable individuals to satisfy their curiosity and to increase their scientific knowledge.

This clashed with the norms of many of the scientists involved, who claimed that science could not operate successfully under such requirements. The Manhattan Project officials also had difficulty with journalists, Congressmen, federal officials who were not "in the know", residents near local sites, judges adjudicating land claims, and other sources of speculation, prying, and leaks, along with concerns about espionage and sabotage. Groves relied on the FBI and his own autonomous G-2 intelligence unit to investigate potential security violations. Ultimately over 1,500 "loose talk" cases were investigated during the war.

Because of its relative success at keeping the story out of newspapers, Byron Price, head of the Office of Censorship, ultimately designated the Manhattan Project "the best-kept secret of the war". In 1945 Life estimated that before the Hiroshima and Nagasaki bombings "probably no more than a few dozen men in the entire country knew the full meaning of the Manhattan Project, and perhaps only a thousand others even were aware that work on atoms was involved." The magazine wrote that the more than 100,000 others employed with the project "worked like moles in the dark". Warned that disclosing the project's secrets was punishable by 10 years in prison or a fine of US$10,000 (equivalent to $179,000 in 2025), they monitored "dials and switches while behind thick concrete walls mysterious reactions took place" without knowing the purpose of their jobs.

In December 1945 the US Army published a secret report assessing the security apparatus surrounding the Manhattan Project. The report states that the project was "more drastically guarded than any other highly secret war development." The surrounding security infrastructure was so vast and thorough that in the early days of the project in 1943, investigators vetted 400,000 potential employees and 600 companies for potential security risks.

=== Censorship ===
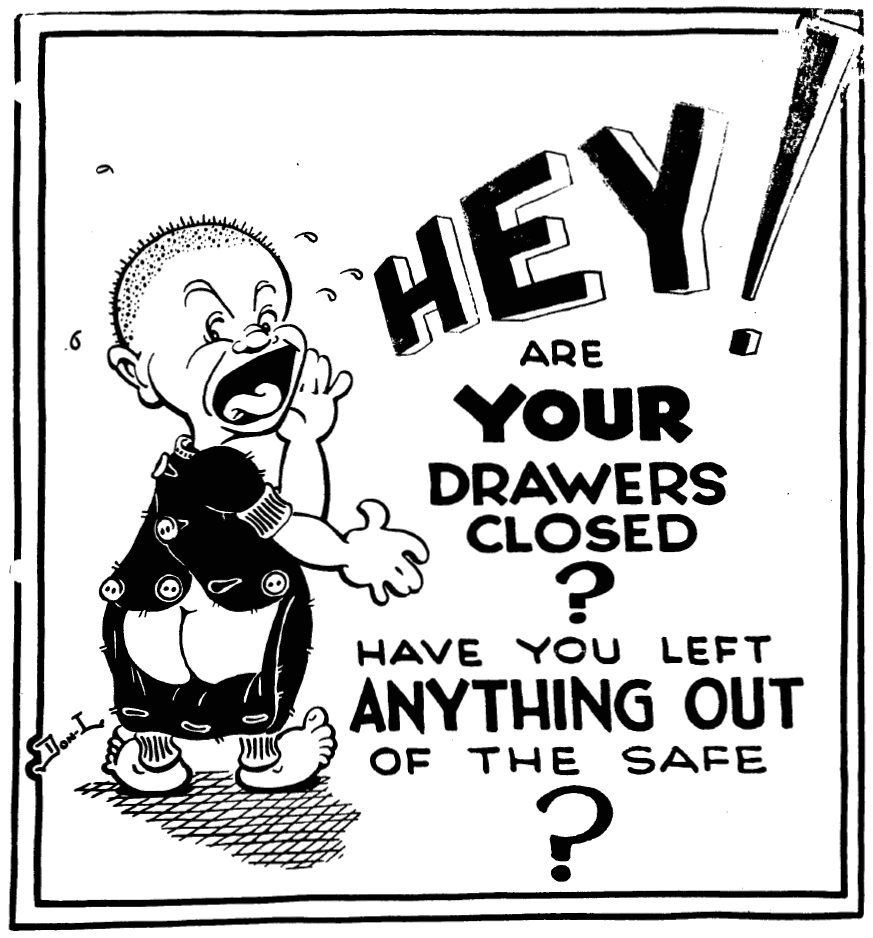
Security poster, warning office workers to close drawers and put documents in safes when not being used

Voluntary censorship of atomic information began before the Manhattan Project. After the start of the European war in 1939 American scientists began avoiding publishing military-related research, and in 1940 scientific journals began asking the National Academy of Sciences to clear articles. William L. Laurence of The New York Times, who wrote an article on atomic fission in The Saturday Evening Post of 7 September 1940, later learned that government officials asked librarians nationwide in 1943 to withdraw the issue. The Soviets noticed the silence, however. In April 1942 nuclear physicist Georgy Flyorov wrote to Joseph Stalin on the absence of articles on nuclear fission in American journals; this resulted in the Soviet Union establishing its own atomic bomb project.

The Manhattan Project operated under tight security lest its discovery induce Axis powers, especially Germany, to accelerate their own nuclear projects or undertake covert operations against the project. The Office of Censorship relied on the press to comply with a voluntary code of conduct it published, and the project at first avoided notifying the office. By early 1943 newspapers began publishing reports of large construction in Tennessee and Washington, and the office began discussing with the project how to maintain secrecy. In June it asked newspapers and broadcasters to avoid discussing "atom smashing, atomic energy, atomic fission, atomic splitting, or any of their equivalents. The use for military purposes of radium or radioactive materials, heavy water, high voltage discharge equipment, cyclotrons."

=== Soviet spies ===
The prospect of sabotage was always present, and sometimes suspected when there were equipment failures. While there were some problems believed to be the result of careless or disgruntled employees, there were no confirmed instances of Axis-instigated sabotage. However, on 10 March 1945, a Japanese fire balloon struck a power line, and the resulting power surge caused the three reactors at Hanford to be temporarily shut down. With so many people involved, security was difficult. A special Counter Intelligence Corps detachment was formed to handle the project's security issues. By 1943, it was clear that the Soviet Union was attempting to penetrate the project. Lieutenant Colonel Boris T. Pash, the head of the Counter Intelligence Branch of the Western Defense Command, investigated suspected Soviet espionage at the Radiation Laboratory in Berkeley. Oppenheimer informed Pash that he had been approached by a fellow professor at Berkeley, Haakon Chevalier, about passing information to the Soviet Union.

The most successful Soviet spy was Klaus Fuchs, a physicist and member of the British Mission who was intimately involved in work at Los Alamos on the design of the implosion bomb. His espionage activities were not identified until 1950, as a result of the Venona project. The revelation damaged the United States' nuclear cooperation with Britain and Canada. More spies were subsequently uncovered, leading to the arrest of Harry Gold, David Greenglass, and Julius and Ethel Rosenberg. Other spies like George Koval and Theodore Hall remained unknown for decades. The value of the espionage is difficult to quantify, as the principal constraint on the Soviet atomic bomb project was their short supply of uranium ore. It may have saved the Soviets at least one or two years in the development of their own bomb, although some historians have argued the Soviets spent as much time vetting and reduplicating the information as they would have saved had they trusted it.

== Foreign intelligence ==
In addition to developing the atomic bomb, the Manhattan Project was charged with gathering intelligence on the German nuclear energy project. It was believed that the Japanese nuclear weapons program was not far advanced because Japan had little access to uranium ore, but it was initially feared that Germany was very close to developing its own weapons. At the instigation of the Manhattan Project, a bombing and sabotage campaign was carried out against heavy water plants in German-occupied Norway. A small mission was created, jointly staffed by the Office of Naval Intelligence, OSRD, the Manhattan Project, and Army Intelligence (G-2), to investigate enemy scientific developments. It was not restricted to those involving nuclear weapons. The chief of Army Intelligence, Major General George V. Strong, appointed Boris Pash to command the unit, which was codenamed "Alsos" (Greek for "grove"). Samuel Goudsmit was the scientific director of the Alsos mission.

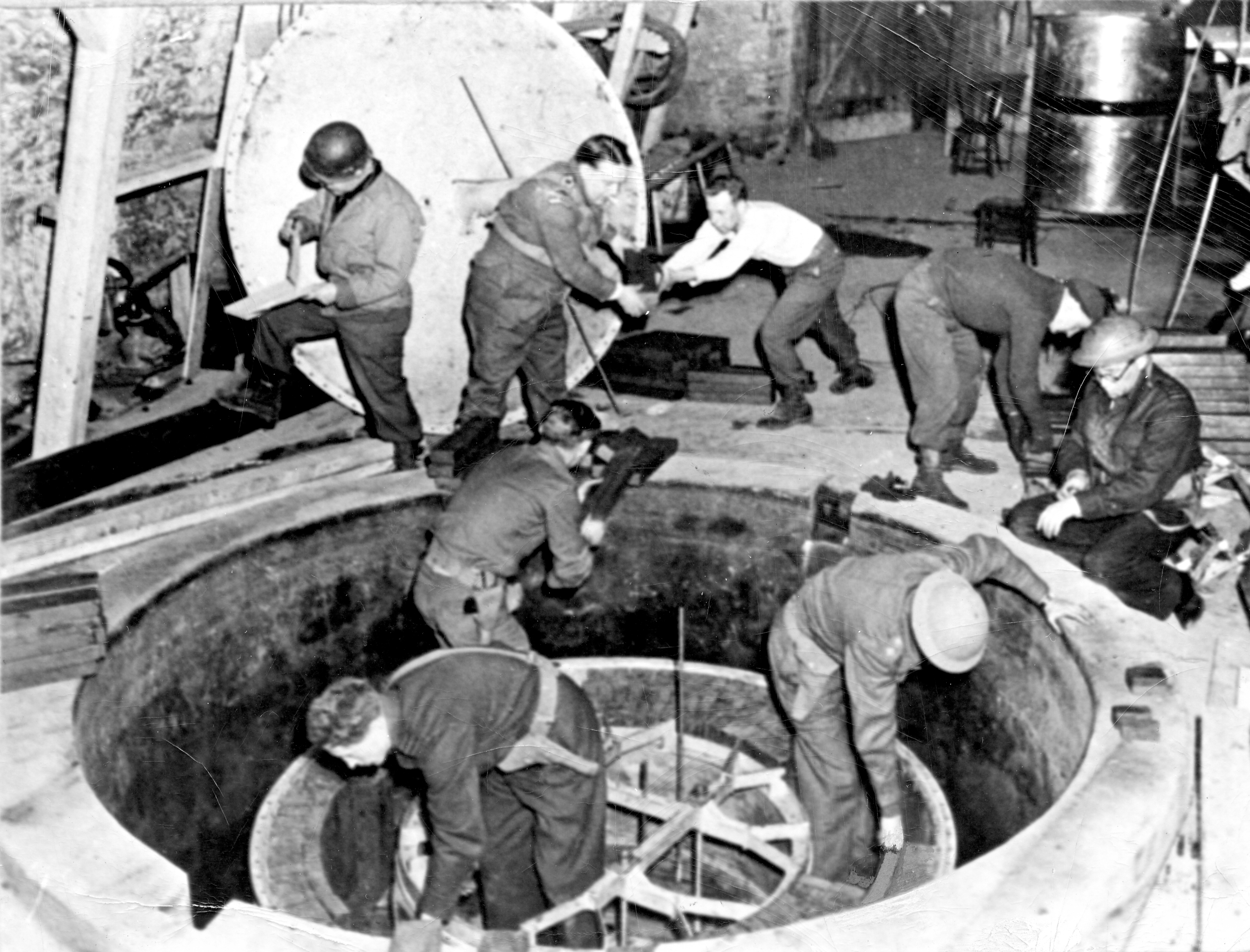
Allied soldiers dismantle the German experimental nuclear reactor at Haigerloch.

The Alsos Mission to Italy questioned physics laboratory staff at the University of Rome following the capture of the city in June 1944. Meanwhile, Pash formed a combined British and American Alsos mission in London under the command of Captain Horace K. Calvert to participate in Operation Overlord. Groves considered the risk that the Germans might attempt to disrupt the Normandy landings with radioactive poisons was sufficient to warn General Dwight D. Eisenhower and send an officer to brief his chief of staff, Lieutenant General Walter Bedell Smith. Under the codename Operation Peppermint, special equipment was prepared and Chemical Warfare Service teams were trained in its use.

Following in the wake of the advancing Allied armies, the Alsos team interrogated scientists and searched facilities in liberated areas of France and Germany to learn about the German work. Goudsmit concluded in November 1944 that the German nuclear program had never made it beyond the laboratory stage. As he put it later: "The evidence at hand proved definitely that Germany had no atom bomb and was not likely to have one in any reasonable time."

Interrogation of German prisoners indicated that uranium and thorium were being processed in Oranienburg, so Groves arranged for it to be bombed on 15 March 1945 to deny its capture by the Soviet Union. An Alsos team went to Stassfurt in the Soviet Occupation Zone and retrieved 11 tons of ore from WIFO. In April 1945, Pash, in command of a composite force known as T-Force, conducted Operation Harborage, a sweep behind enemy lines of Hechingen, Bisingen, and Haigerloch—the heart of the German nuclear effort. T-Force captured nuclear laboratories, documents, equipment and supplies, including heavy water and 1.5 tons of metallic uranium.

Alsos teams rounded up German scientists including Kurt Diebner, Otto Hahn, Walther Gerlach, Werner Heisenberg, and Carl Friedrich von Weizsäcker. They were taken to England and interned at Farm Hall, where they were surreptitiously surveilled.

== Atomic bombings of Hiroshima and Nagasaki ==
=== Preparations ===
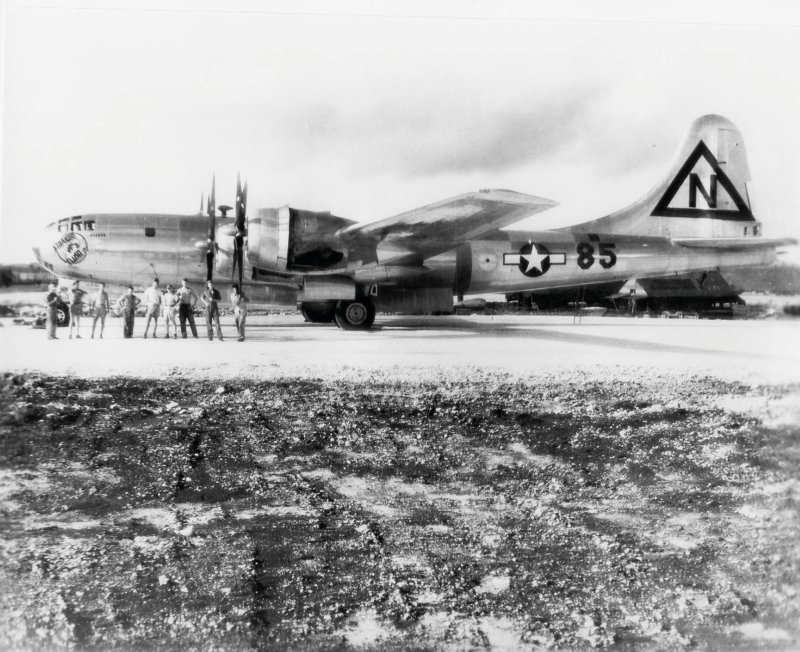
Silverplate B-29 Straight Flush. The tail code of the 444th Bombardment Group is painted on for security reasons.

The only Allied aircraft capable of carrying the 17-foot (5.2 m) long Thin Man or the 59-inch (150 cm) wide Fat Man was the British Avro Lancaster, but using a British aircraft would have caused difficulties with maintenance. Groves hoped that the American Boeing B-29 Superfortress could be modified to carry a Thin Man by joining its two bomb bays together. This became unnecessary after Thin Man was abandoned, as a Little Boy was short enough to fit into a B-29 bomb bay, but modifications were still required. The Army Air Forces Materiel Command at Wright Field, Ohio, began Silverplate, the codename for the modification of the B-29, in November 1943. Test drops were carried out at Muroc Army Air Field and the Naval Ordnance Test Station in California with Thin Man and Fat Man pumpkin bombs to test their ballistic, fuzing and stability characteristics.

The 509th Composite Group was activated on 17 December 1944 at Wendover Army Air Field, Utah, under the command of Colonel Paul W. Tibbets. Its 393rd Bombardment Squadron, equipped with Silverplate B-29s, practiced long-distance flights over water and dropped pumpkin bombs. A special unit known as Project Alberta was formed at Los Alamos under Parsons's command to assist in preparing and delivering the bombs. The 509th Composite Group deployed to North Field on Tinian in July 1945. Most of the components for the Little Boy left San Francisco on the cruiser USS Indianapolis on 16 July and arrived on Tinian on 26 July. The remaining components, which included six highly enriched uranium rings, were delivered by three Douglas C-54 Skymasters of the 509th Group's 320th Troop Carrier Squadron. Two Fat Man assemblies traveled to Tinian in specially modified 509th Composite Group B-29s, and the first plutonium core went in a special C-54.

At the end of December 1944, worried by the heavy losses occurring in the Battle of the Bulge, Roosevelt instructed Groves and Stimson that if the atomic bombs were ready before the war with Germany ended, they should be ready to drop them on Germany, but Japan was regarded as more likely. In late April 1945, a targeting committee was established to determine which cities should be targets, and it recommended Kokura, Hiroshima, Niigata, and Kyoto. Stimson intervened, announcing that he would be making the targeting decision, and that he would not authorize the bombing of Kyoto on the grounds of its historical and religious significance. Nagasaki was substituted. In May 1945, the Interim Committee was created to advise on wartime and postwar use of nuclear energy. The Interim Committee in turn established a scientific panel consisting of Arthur Compton, Fermi, Lawrence, and Oppenheimer that offered its opinion not just on the likely physical effects of an atomic bomb, but on its probable military and political impact. In a meeting on 1 June, the Interim Committee resolved that "the bomb should be used against Japan as soon as possible; that it be used on a war plant surrounded by workers' homes; and that it be used without prior warning".

At the Potsdam Conference in Germany, President Harry S. Truman told Stalin that the US had "a new weapon of unusual destructive force", without giving any details. As he showed "no special interest," Truman erroneously assumed that Stalin did not understand. In reality, Soviet spies had kept Stalin informed of the work and the planned test.

A strike order from General Thomas T. Handy to General Carl Spaatz was approved by Marshall and Stimson on 25 July which specified that the "first special bomb" be used "after about 3 August 1945," and that "additional bombs" would be used "as soon as made ready by the project staff". The operational plan was to drop the first bomb on 2 August, the second bomb on 10 August, and a third bomb around 24 August. However, due to weather conditions over Japan and the desire for visual bombing, the date of the first bombing mission was pushed back to 6 August, and the second was moved forward to 9 August.

=== Bombings ===
On 6 August 1945, the Enola Gay, a Boeing B-29 Superfortress of the 393d Bombardment Squadron, piloted by Tibbets, lifted off from North Field with a Little Boy in its bomb bay. Hiroshima, the headquarters of the 2nd General Army and Fifth Division and a port of embarkation, was the primary target, with Kokura and Nagasaki as alternatives. Parsons, the weaponeer in charge of the mission, completed the bomb assembly in the air to minimize the risks of a nuclear explosion in the event of a crash during takeoff. The bomb detonated at an altitude of 1,750 feet (530 m) with a blast that was later estimated to be the equivalent of 13 kilotons of TNT. An area of approximately 4.7 square miles (12 km^{2}) was destroyed. Japanese officials determined that 69% of Hiroshima's buildings were destroyed and another 6–7% damaged. Early estimates were that 66,000 people were killed and 69,000 injured; later re-estimations that included people ignored by previous methods, like Korean slave laborers and additional soldiers, concluded there might have been 140,000 dead from the attack by December 1945.

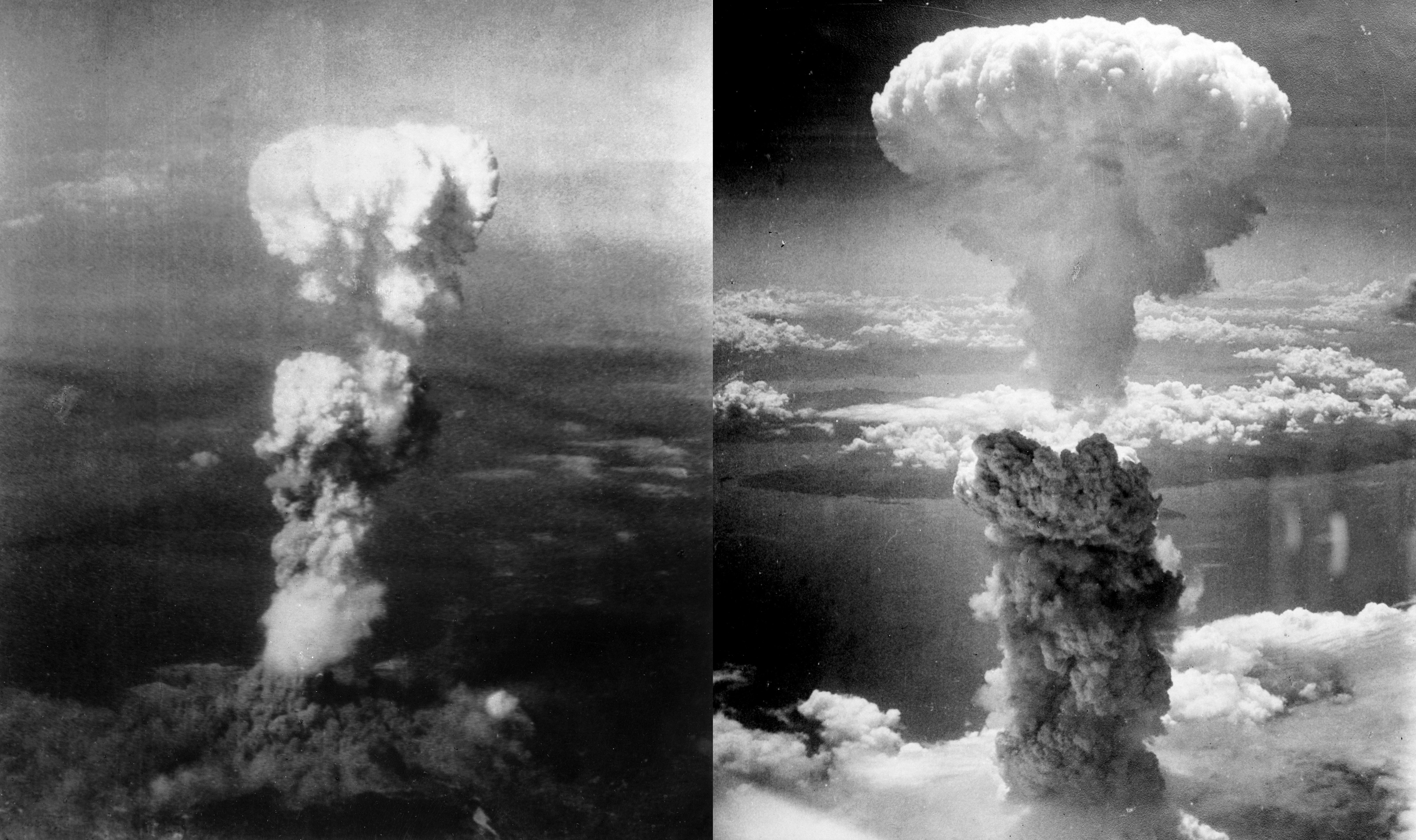
The mushroom clouds of the atomic attacks on Hiroshima, Japan, 6 August 1945 (left) and Nagasaki, Japan, 9 August 1945 (right)

On the morning of 9 August 1945, the Bockscar, a second B-29 piloted by the 393d Bombardment Squadron's commander, Major Charles W. Sweeney, lifted off with a Fat Man on board. This time, Ashworth served as weaponeer and Kokura was the primary target. When they reached Kokura, they found cloud cover had obscured the city, prohibiting the visual attack required by orders. After three runs and with fuel running low, they headed for the secondary target, Nagasaki. Ashworth decided that a radar approach would be used if the target was obscured, but a last-minute break in the clouds over Nagasaki allowed a visual approach as ordered. The Fat Man was dropped over the city's industrial valley midway between the Mitsubishi Steel and Arms Works in the south and the Mitsubishi-Urakami Ordnance Works in the north. The resulting explosion had a blast yield equivalent to 21 kilotons of TNT, roughly the same as the Trinity blast, but was confined to the Urakami Valley, and a major portion of the city, including the city center, was protected by the intervening hills. About 44% of the city was destroyed, and estimates of casualties range from 40,000 to 80,000 people killed and at least 60,000 injured. Overall, an estimated 35,000–40,000 people were killed and 60,000 injured.

Groves expected to have another atomic bomb ready for use on 19 August, with three more in September and a further three in October. Two more Fat Man assemblies were readied, and scheduled to leave Kirtland Field for Tinian on 11 and 14 August. At Los Alamos, technicians worked 24 hours straight to cast another plutonium core. Although cast, it still needed to be pressed and coated, which would take until 16 August.

On 10 August, Truman was informed that another bomb was being prepared. He ordered that no additional atomic bombs could be used without his express authority. According to Henry A. Wallace, Truman told his cabinet that "the thought of wiping out another 100,000 people was too horrible. He didn't like the idea of killing, as he said, 'all those kids.'" Groves suspended the third core's shipment on 13 August.

On 11 August, Groves phoned Warren with orders to organize a survey team to report on the damage and radioactivity at Hiroshima and Nagasaki as soon as the war ended. A party equipped with portable Geiger counters arrived in Hiroshima on 8 September headed by Farrell and Warren, with Japanese Rear Admiral Masao Tsuzuki, who acted as a translator. They remained in Hiroshima until 14 September and then surveyed Nagasaki from 19 September to 8 October. This and other scientific missions to Japan provided valuable data on the effects of the atomic bomb, and led to the creation of the Atomic Bomb Casualty Commission.

In anticipation of the bombings, Groves had commissioned physicist Henry DeWolf Smyth to prepare a sanitized technical history of the project for public consumption. The idea of releasing such information freely was controversial; the decision to do so was made by Truman personally. The "Smyth Report" was released to the public on 12 August 1945.

Japan announced its surrender on 15 August. The necessity of the bombings became a subject of controversy among historians. Some questioned whether "atomic diplomacy" would have attained the same goals, and the relative weight that the bombs and the Soviet declaration of war had on the Japanese willingness to surrender. The Franck Report was the most notable effort pushing for a demonstration but was turned down by the Interim Committee's scientific panel. The Szilárd petition, drafted in July 1945 and signed by dozens of scientists working on the Manhattan Project, was a late attempt at warning Truman about his responsibility in using such weapons.

== After the war ==
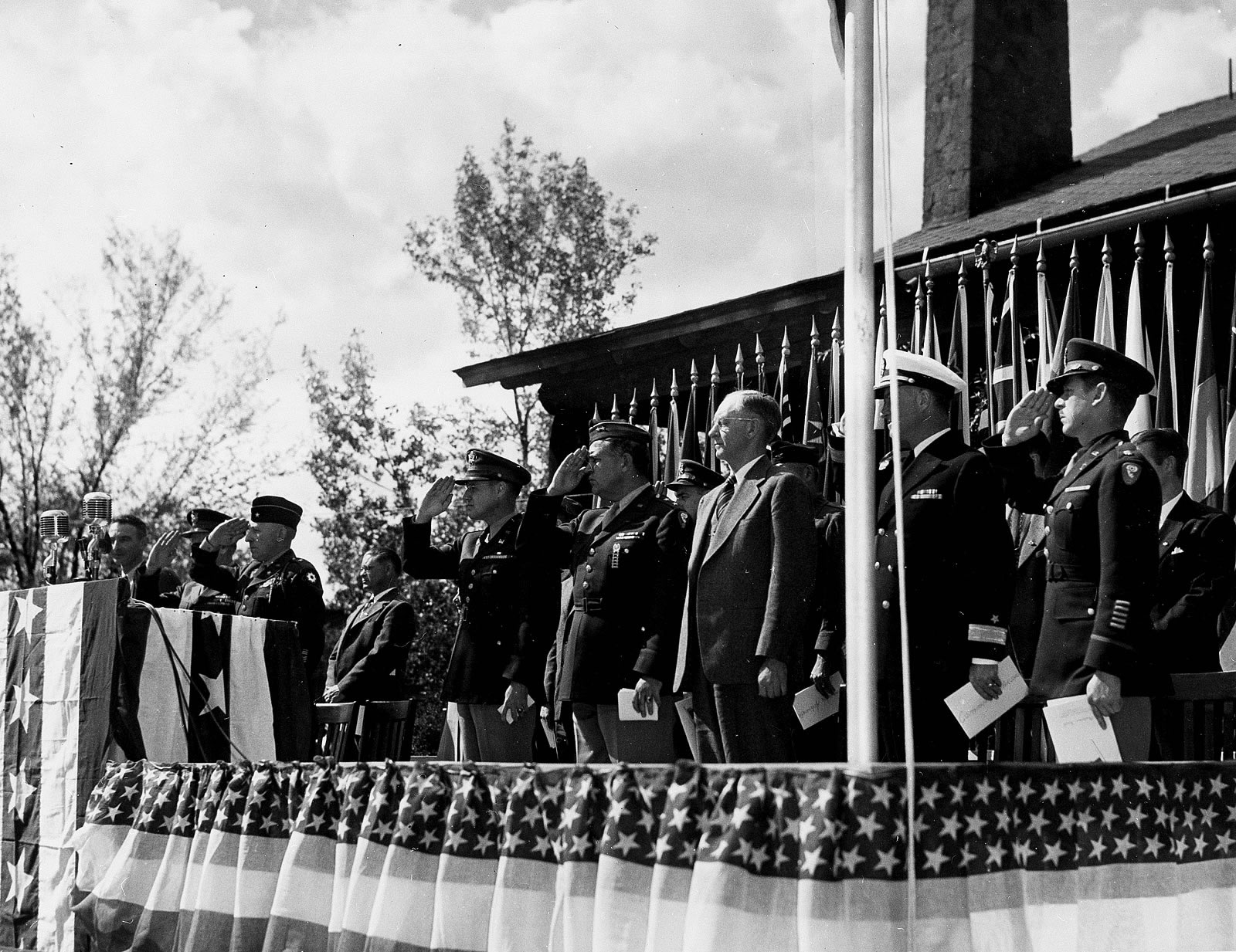
Presentation of the Army–Navy "E" Award at Los Alamos on 16 October 1945. Standing, left to right: J. Robert Oppenheimer, unidentified, unidentified, Kenneth Nichols, Leslie Groves, Robert Gordon Sproul, William Sterling Parsons.

The Manhattan Project became instantly famous after the bombing of Hiroshima and the partial lifting of its secrecy. It was widely credited with ending the war, and Groves worked to credit its contractors, whose work had hitherto been secret. Groves and Nichols presented them with Army–Navy "E" Awards, and over 20 Presidential Medals for Merit were awarded to key contractors and scientists, including Bush and Oppenheimer. Military personnel received the Legion of Merit.

The Manhattan Project persisted until 31 December 1946, and the Manhattan District to 15 August 1947. During this time, it suffered from numerous difficulties caused by technical problems, the effects of rapid demobilization, and a lack of clarity on its long-term mission.

At Hanford, plutonium production declined as Reactors B, D and F wore out, poisoned by fission products and swelling of the graphite moderator known as the Wigner effect. The swelling damaged the charging tubes where the uranium was irradiated to produce plutonium, rendering them unusable. Production was curtailed and the oldest unit, B pile, was closed down so at least one reactor would remain available. Research continued, with DuPont and the Metallurgical Laboratory developing a redox solvent extraction process as an alternative plutonium extraction technique to the bismuth phosphate process, which left unspent uranium in a state from which it could not easily be recovered.

Bomb engineering was carried out by the Z Division, initially located at Wendover Field but moved to Oxnard Field, New Mexico, in September 1945 to be closer to Los Alamos. This marked the beginning of the Sandia Base. Nearby Kirtland Field was used as a B-29 base for aircraft compatibility and drop tests. As reservist officers were demobilized, they were replaced by about fifty hand-picked regular officers.

Nichols recommended that S-50 and the Alpha tracks at Y-12 be closed down. This was done in September. Although performing better than ever, the Alpha tracks could not compete with K-25 and the new K-27, which had commenced operation in January 1946. In December, the Y-12 plant was closed, cutting the Tennessee Eastman payroll from 8,600 to 1,500 and saving $2 million a month.

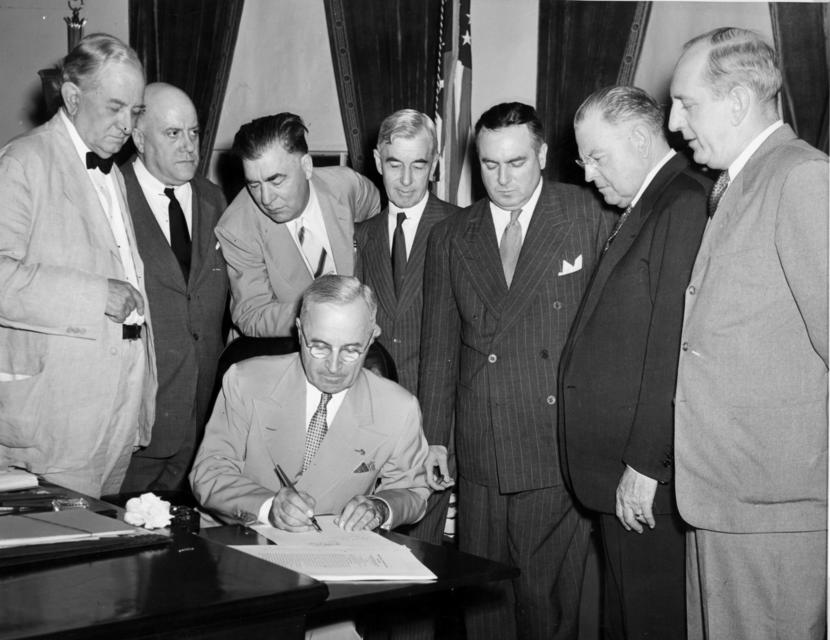
President Harry S. Truman signs the Atomic Energy Act of 1946, establishing the United States Atomic Energy Commission.

Nowhere was demobilization more of a problem than at Los Alamos, where there was an exodus of talent. Much remained to be done. The bombs used on Hiroshima and Nagasaki needed work to make them simpler, safer and more reliable. Implosion methods needed to be developed for uranium in place of the wasteful gun method, and composite uranium-plutonium cores were needed now that plutonium was in short supply. However, uncertainty about the future of the laboratory made it hard to induce people to stay. Oppenheimer returned to his job at the University of California and Groves appointed Norris Bradbury as an interim replacement; Bradbury remained in the post for the next 25 years. Groves attempted to combat the dissatisfaction caused by the lack of amenities with a construction program that included an improved water supply, three hundred houses, and recreation facilities.

Manhattan Project personnel participated in the first postwar nuclear tests, Operation Crossroads, conducted at Bikini Atoll in July 1946. Two Fat Man-type bombs were detonated — one as an airburst, one as an underwater burst — to investigate the effect of nuclear weapons on warships. Press and international observers were allowed to attend, making the tests an international spectacle.

Following a domestic debate over the peacetime management of the nuclear program, the Atomic Energy Act of 1946 created the United States Atomic Energy Commission to take over the project's functions and assets. It established civilian control over atomic development. Military aspects were taken over by the Armed Forces Special Weapons Project (AFSWP).

After the bombings at Hiroshima and Nagasaki, a number of Manhattan Project physicists founded the Bulletin of the Atomic Scientists (1945) and Emergency Committee of Atomic Scientists (1946), which began as an emergency action undertaken by scientists who saw urgent need for an educational program about atomic weapons. In the face of the destructiveness of the bombs and in anticipation of the nuclear arms race several project members including Bohr, Bush and Conant expressed the view that it was necessary to reach agreement on international control of nuclear research and atomic weapons. The Baruch Plan, unveiled in a speech to the newly formed United Nations Atomic Energy Commission (UNAEC) in June 1946, proposed the establishment of an international atomic development authority, but was not adopted.

== Cost ==
Manhattan Project costs through 31 December 1945
Site	Cost (1945 USD, millions)	Cost (2025 USD, millions)	% of total
Oak Ridge	$1,188	$16,825	62.9%
Hanford	$390	$5,523	20.6%
Special operating materials	$103	$1,464	5.5%
Los Alamos	$74	$1,048	3.9%
Research and development	$70	$987	3.7%
Government overhead	$37	$527	2.0%
Heavy water plants	$27	$379	1.4%
Total	$1,890	$26,753	

The project expenditure through 1 October 1945 was $1.845 billion, equivalent to less than nine days of wartime spending, and was $2.191 billion when the AEC assumed control on 1 January 1947. The total allocation was $2.4 billion; 84% of the costs through the end of 1945 were spent on the plants at Oak Ridge and Hanford. At both sites, the majority of the costs were for construction (74% at Oak Ridge, 87% at Hanford), with the rest being for operations.

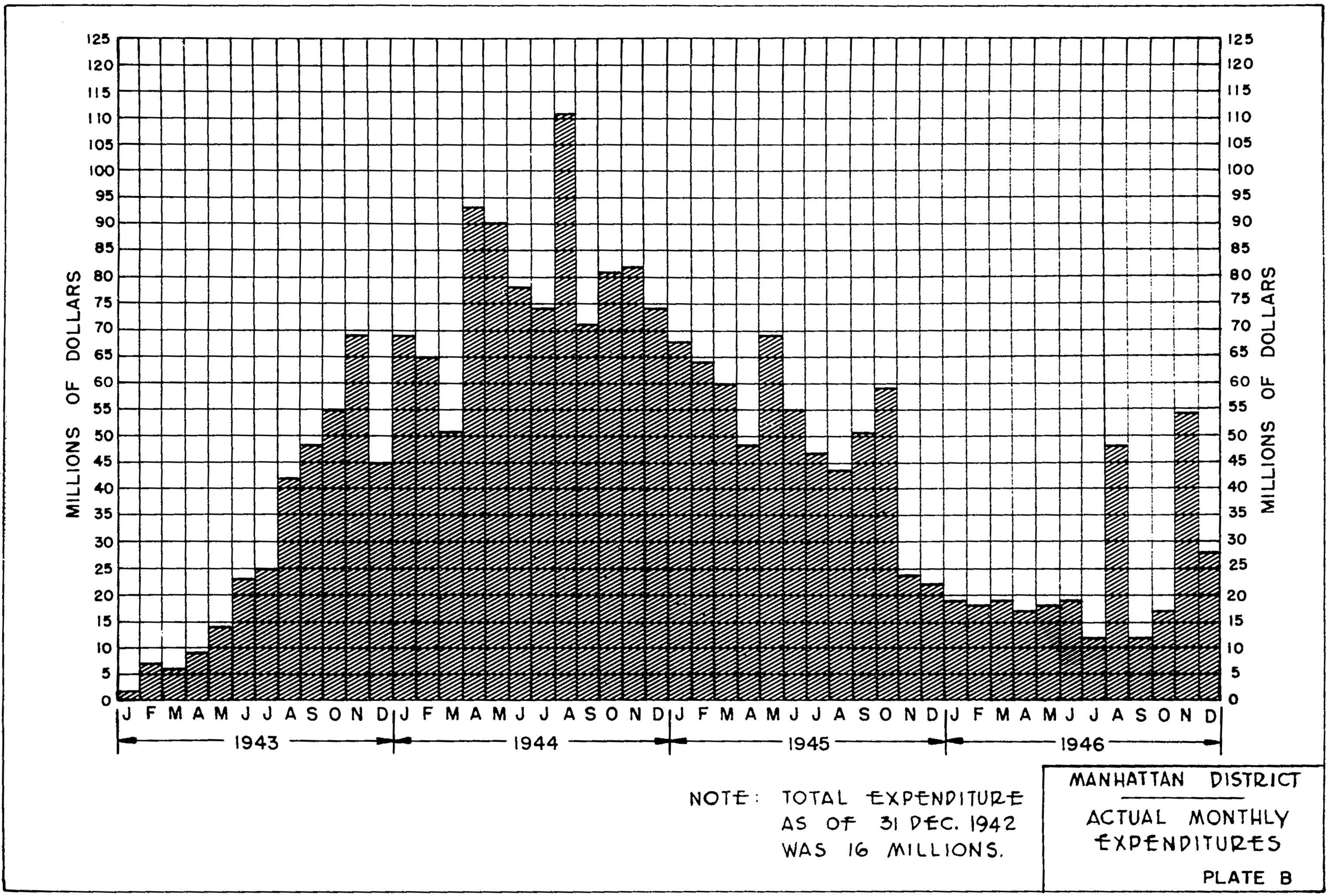
Manhattan Project monthly expenditures from January 1943 through the end of December 1946. In its peak month, August 1944, US$111.4 million was spent on the project.

Initial funding for the project was through the general budget of the OSRD. As plans were made to turn the work over to the Corps of Engineers, Bush wrote to Roosevelt in late 1942 that "it would be ruinous to the essential secrecy to have to defend before an appropriations committee any request for funds for this project." Instead, initial funding was done through discretionary funds to which Roosevelt had access. Congress was kept ignorant of the project because of concerns that Congressmen were prone to leaking information, and because it was feared that it would appear to be a boondoggle. Appropriations were quietly slipped into other bills, but the project's mounting costs and large facilities (which appeared to many to produce nothing) attracted scrutiny. The Truman Committee that investigated wartime waste and fraud attempted to audit the project several times, but each time their inquiries were rejected.

These Congressional inquiries, along with the need for smooth budgetary approval, led to Bush, Groves, and Stimson agreeing in the spring of 1944 that a few high-ranking Congressmen should be told of the project's purpose. By March 1945, seven were officially informed. The funds were hidden into appropriation requests with the inconspicuous headings, frequently "Engineer Service Army" and "Expediting Production." In late May 1945, to further expedite budget issues and assure the cooperation of Albert J. Engel, who threatened to reveal the existence of the project if he was not told more about it, five additional Congressmen were permitted to visit Oak Ridge to assure themselves of "the reasonableness of the various living accommodations which had been provided, [and] that they actually observe the size and scope of the installations and that some of the complexities of the project be demonstrated to them." (Note: The seven Congressmen officially informed were: Alben W. Barkley (Senate Majority Leader), Styles Bridges (Ranking minority member of the Sub-Committee on Military Appropriations), Joseph W. Martin Jr. (House Minority Leader), John W. McCormack (House Majority Leader), Sam Rayburn (Speaker of the House), Elmer Thomas (Chair of the Sub-Committee on Military Appropriations), and Wallace H. White (Senate Minority Leader). The five allowed to tour Oak Ridge were: Clarence Cannon, Albert J. Engel, George H. Mahon, J. Buell Snyder, and John Taber.)

The Manhattan Project ultimately produced the three bombs used (the Trinity gadget, Little Boy, and Fat Man) and an additional unused Fat Man, making the average wartime cost per bomb around $500 million in 1945 dollars. By comparison, the project's total cost by the end of 1945 was about 90% of the total spent on the production of US small arms (not including ammunition) and 34% of the total spent on US tanks during the same period. It was the second most expensive weapons project undertaken by the United States during the war, behind only the Boeing B-29 Superfortress.

== Legacy ==
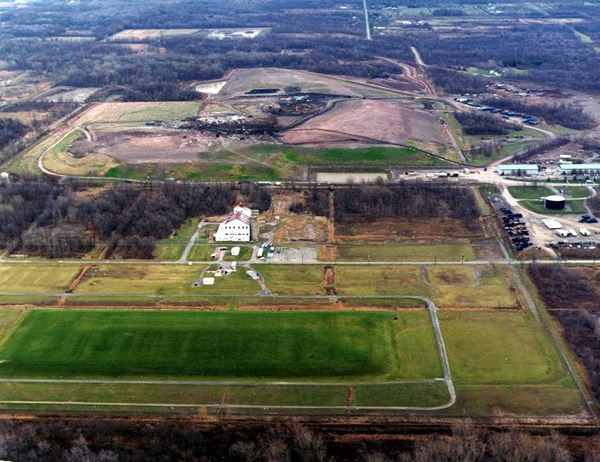
The Lake Ontario Ordnance Works (LOOW) near Niagara Falls became a principal repository for Manhattan Project waste for the Eastern United States. All of the radioactive materials stored at the LOOW site—including thorium, uranium, and the world's largest concentration of radium-226—were buried in an "Interim Waste Containment Structure" (in the foreground) in 1991.

The political and cultural impacts of the development of nuclear weapons were profound. William Laurence of The New York Times, the first to use the phrase "Atomic Age", became the official correspondent for the Manhattan Project in spring 1945. He witnessed both the Trinity test and the bombing of Nagasaki and wrote the official press releases on them. He went on to write a series of articles extolling the virtues of the new weapon. His reporting helped to spur public awareness of the potential of nuclear technology and motivated its development in the United States and Soviet Union.

The Manhattan Project left a legacy of a network of national laboratories: the Lawrence Berkeley National Laboratory, Los Alamos National Laboratory, Oak Ridge National Laboratory, Argonne National Laboratory, and Ames Laboratory. Two more were established by Groves soon after the war, the Brookhaven National Laboratory at Upton, New York, and the Sandia National Laboratories at Albuquerque, New Mexico. They would be in the vanguard of the kind of large-scale research that Alvin Weinberg, the director of the Oak Ridge National Laboratory, would call Big Science. Computational science, especially computational engineering, was influenced by the Manhattan Project; Los Alamos ran one of the most advanced tabulating machine facilities in the world.

The Naval Research Laboratory had long been interested in the prospect of using nuclear power for warship propulsion, and sought to create its own nuclear project. In May 1946, Nimitz, now Chief of Naval Operations, decided that the Navy should instead work with the Manhattan Project. A group of naval officers were assigned to Oak Ridge, the most senior of whom was Captain Hyman G. Rickover, who became assistant director there. They immersed themselves in the study of nuclear energy, laying the foundations for a nuclear-powered navy. A similar group of Air Force personnel arrived at Oak Ridge in September 1946 with the aim of developing nuclear aircraft. Their Nuclear Energy for the Propulsion of Aircraft project ran into formidable technical difficulties and was ultimately canceled.

The ability of the new reactors to create radioactive isotopes in previously unheard-of quantities sparked a revolution in nuclear medicine. Starting in mid-1946, Oak Ridge began distributing radioisotopes to hospitals and universities, primarily iodine-131 and phosphorus-32, for cancer diagnosis and treatment. Isotopes were also used in biological, industrial and agricultural research.

Its production sites also left a legacy of environmental damage. At Hanford, for example, corrosive and radioactive wastes were stored in "hastily fabricated, single-shell, steel-lined, underground storage tanks", intended to be temporary. They were neglected and eventually leaked. Issues of this kind resulted in Hanford becoming "one of the most contaminated nuclear waste sites in North America", and the subject of significant cleanup efforts after it was deactivated.

On handing over control to the Atomic Energy Commission, Groves bid farewell to the people who had worked on the Manhattan Project:

Five years ago, the idea of Atomic Power was only a dream. You have made that dream a reality. You have seized upon the most nebulous of ideas and translated them into actualities. You have built cities where none were known before. You have constructed industrial plants of a magnitude and to a precision heretofore deemed impossible. You built the weapon which ended the War and thereby saved countless American lives. With regard to peacetime applications, you have raised the curtain on vistas of a new world.

The Manhattan Project National Historical Park was established in 2015.

== See also ==
- Fat Man and Little Boy (film) – 1989 film by Roland Joffé
- Oppenheimer (film) – 2023 film by Christopher Nolan
- Oppenheimer (TV series) – 1980 drama television serial
- Polytetrafluoroethylene – synthetic polymer also known as Teflon, used in the Manhattan Project
- The Bomb (film) – 2015 American documentary film
- Timeline of nuclear weapons development
