= John Lansdale Jr. =

United States Army colonel

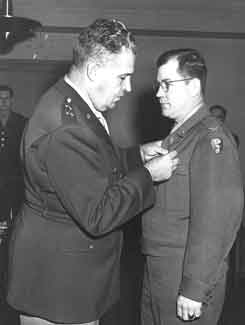
- Lansdale is awarded the Legion of Merit by Major General Leslie Groves, the director of the Manhattan Project.
- Nickname: Jack
- Born: 9 January 1912; Oakland, California, U.S.
- Died: 22 August 2003 (aged 91) Annapolis, Maryland, U.S.
- Buried: All Hallows Cemetery
- Allegiance: United States
- Branch: United States Army
- Service years: 1941–1945
- Rank: Colonel
- Conflicts: World War II: Allied Invasion of Germany
- Awards: Legion of Merit; Commander of the Order of the British Empire
- Alma mater: Virginia Military Institute (BS); Harvard University (LLB)

John Lansdale Jr. (9 January 1912 – 22 August 2003) was a United States Army colonel who was in charge of intelligence and security for the Manhattan Project.

A graduate of the Virginia Military Institute and Harvard Law School, Lansdale was commissioned as a second lieutenant in the United States Army Reserve in 1933. He was called up for active duty in June 1941, and was assigned to the Investigations Branch in the Office of the Assistant Chief of Staff, G-2 (military intelligence) of the War Department General Staff. He became involved with the Manhattan Project in 1942, eventually becoming Brigadier General Leslie Groves's special assistant for security. Lansdale coordinated the activities of the Manhattan Project's field security teams with those of other agencies such as the FBI.

In April 1945, Groves sent Lansdale to Europe, where he worked with the Alsos Mission to secure 1,000 tons of uranium ore from the German Wirtschaftliche Forschungsgesellschaft (WiFO) plant in Stassfurt. He also participated in the planning and execution of Operation Harborage, in which a special Allied force went deep behind enemy lines, seized 1.5 tons of uranium ingots, and captured a number of German nuclear energy project scientists, including Carl Friedrich von Weizsäcker, Max von Laue, Karl Wirtz, Horst Korsching and Erich Bagge and Otto Hahn.

== Early life ==
John Mannen (Jack) Lansdale was born in Oakland, California on 11 June 1912, the son of John Lansdale Sr. and his wife May Hamilton née Mannen. After his sister Sally Mannen Lansdale was born in 1921 he dropped his middle name and was henceforth known as John Lansdale Jr. He was educated at San Jacinto High School, from which he graduated in 1929. He entered the Virginia Military Institute, graduating in 1933, and then Harvard Law School, from which he graduated in June 1936. He took a job with a law firm, Squire, Sanders and Dempsey (now Squire Patton Boggs), initially in Cleveland, Ohio and later in Washington, D.C. He married Metta Virginia Tomlinson in Trinity Episcopal Church in Houston, Texas on 17 June 1936. They had five daughters.

== World War II ==
=== Counterintelligence ===
After graduating from the Virginia Military Institute, Lansdale joined the United States Army Reserve. He was commissioned as a second lieutenant in the field artillery branch in 1933, and was promoted to first lieutenant in 1937. He was called up for active duty in June 1941, a few months before the United States entered World War II, and was assigned to the Investigations Branch in the Office of the Assistant Chief of Staff, G-2 (military intelligence) of the War Department General Staff.

In February 1942, Lansdale, now a captain, met with James B. Conant. the Chairman of the National Defense Research Committee, who briefed him on efforts to create an atomic bomb, and charged him with responsibility for counterintelligence at the Radiation Laboratory at the University of California, Berkeley.

When Colonel James C. Marshal established the Manhattan District in June 1942, he created a Protective Security Section as part of its staff, responsible for the security of its people, installations and information. He also arranged with the Assistant Chief of Staff, G-2, Major General George V. Strong, for support from the Military Intelligence Service. Strong gave Lansdale special responsibility for the Manhattan District, and Lansdale, in turn, arranged with the G-2s of each of the service commands for officers to be assigned to report directly to him, thus bypassing both the service command G-2s and their commanders. He also organised a special counterintelligence group in Washington, D.C., headed by himself, that reported directly to both Strong and Brigadier General Leslie Groves, who became director of the Manhattan Project in September 1942.

Lansdale had security concerns about the head of the weapons laboratory, J. Robert Oppenheimer, because of his communist connections, but Lansdale and Groves agreed that Oppenheimer was loyal and cooperative on security matters. Nonetheless, Lansdale had Oppenheimer's movements followed, his telephones tapped, and his mail opened. Lansdale interrogated Oppenheimer over the latter's relationship with Haakon Chevalier.

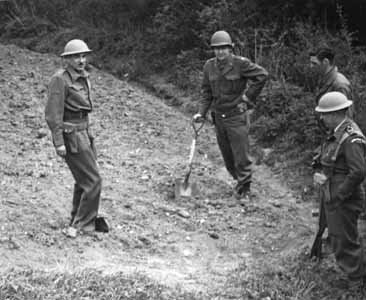
Michael Perrin, Lansdale, Samuel Goudsmit, and Eric Welsh search for uranium in a field at Haigerloch, Germany, in April 1945.

On 1 January 1944, the Army decentralized counterintelligence to the service commands. Lansdale attempted to have his group exempted from this, but when he failed, Groves had Lansdale's unit reassigned to the Manhattan Project, creating a new Counter Intelligence Corps (CIC) unit within the Project. Groves had Lansdale transferred to the Manhattan District, but instead of placing him in charge of the new CIC unit, Groves made Lansdale his special assistant for security at Manhattan Project headquarters in Washington, D.C. Lansdale coordinated the activities of the Manhattan Project's field security teams with those of other agencies such as the FBI.

=== Overseas operations ===
In April 1945, Groves sent Lansdale, now a lieutenant colonel, to Europe, where he met with Lieutenant General Walter B. Smith and Major General Harold Bull of SHAEF to develop a plan for Operation Harborage, the capture of German nuclear energy project scientists, materials and facilities in the vicinity of Hechingen, Bisingen and Haigerloch.

While waiting for an opportunity to launch this operation, the Alsos Mission learned that uranium ore that had been taken from Belgium in 1944 had been shipped to the Wirtschaftliche Forschungsgesellschaft (WiFO) plant in Stassfurt, which was captured by the 83rd Infantry Division on 15 April. As it was in the occupation zone allocated to the Soviet Union at the Yalta Conference, the Alsos Mission, led by Boris Pash and accompanied by Lansdale, arrived on 17 April to remove anything of interest. Over the following ten days, 260 truckloads of uranium ore, sodium uranate and ferro-uranium weighing about 1,000 tons were taken away.

Lansdale accompanied the Alsos Mission on Operation Harborage, which began on 22 April 1945. A special Allied force called T-Force went deep behind enemy lines, seized 1.5 tons of uranium ingots, and captured a number of scientists, including Carl Friedrich von Weizsäcker, Max von Laue, Karl Wirtz, Horst Korsching and Erich Bagge and Otto Hahn.

The uranium ore was handed over to the Combined Development Trust, a legal entity set up to handle the acquisition of nuclear ores and materials. Lansdale had written a legal opinion for the Manhattan Project that it was within the powers of the president of the United States to conclude such agreements with the British without consulting Congress. In July 1945, Lansdale concluded an agreement with Brazil for the purchase of 3,000 tons of thorium-bearing monazite ore. For his wartime services, Lansdale was awarded the Legion of Merit and was made an honorary Commander of the Order of the British Empire.

== Later life ==
After the war, Lansdale and his family moved back to Cleveland, and he returned to working for Squire, Sanders and Dempsey. He also served as a councilman for the city of Shaker Heights, Ohio, from 1949 to 1963. Lansdale testified at a 1954 Atomic Energy Commission hearing on behalf of Oppenheimer, who was threatened with loss of his security clearance because of Communist associates. A seasoned trial lawyer, Lansdale was not intimidated by AEC lawyer Roger Robb's prosecutorial tactics, and his combative replies contrasted sharply with Oppenheimer's own sheepish answers to Robb's questions. Lansdale felt that Oppenheimer was a loyal American citizen and was outraged by his treatment.

In 1972, Lansdale moved to Essex Farm in Anne Arundel County, Maryland. For a time he commuted to Cleveland, but eventually shifted to Squire, Sanders and Dempsey's Washington, D. C. office, remaining with the firm until he retired in 1987. He died at his home near Annapolis, Maryland, on 22 August 2003 and was survived by his five daughters: Helen, Chloe, Mary, Metta Jr. and Sally. His wife Metta had died in 2001. Lansdale was buried at All Hallows Cemetery in Davidsonville, Maryland.

He was inducted into the Military Intelligence Hall of Fame in 2010.
