= Alsos Mission =

Allied scientific intelligence operation during World War II

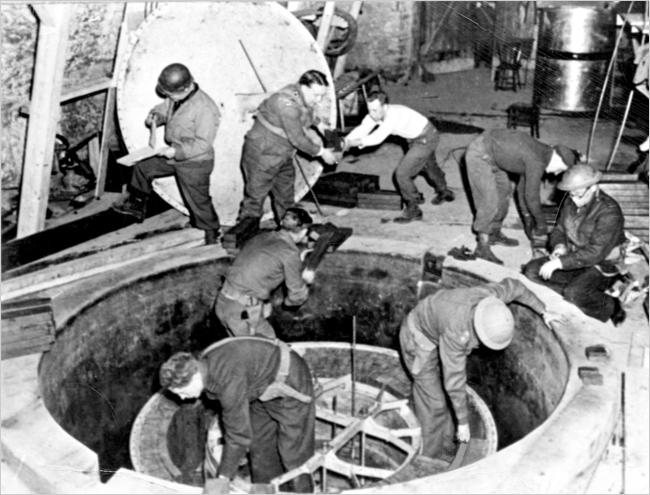
- British and American members of the Alsos Mission dismantle the experimental nuclear reactor that German scientists had built as part of the German nuclear program in Haigerloch.
- Active: Late 1943 – 15 October 1945
- Disbanded: 15 October 1945
- Country: United States; United Kingdom; Netherlands; Norway
- Engagements: World War II: Allied invasion of Italy; Allied invasion of France; Western Allied invasion of Germany

Commanders
- Notable commanders: Boris Pash

The Alsos Mission (/ˈælsɒs/;) was an organized effort by a team of British and United States military, scientific, and intelligence personnel to discover enemy scientific developments during World War II. Its chief focus was to investigate the progress that Germany was making in the area of nuclear technology, and to seize any German nuclear resources that would either be of use to the Manhattan Project or worth denying to the Soviet Union. It also investigated German chemical and biological weapon development and the means to deliver them, and any other advanced Axis technology it was able to get information about in the course of the other investigations (such as the V-2 rocket program).

The Alsos Mission was created after the September 1943 Allied invasion of Italy as part of the Manhattan Project's mission to coordinate foreign intelligence related to enemy nuclear activity. The team had a twofold assignment: search for personnel, records, material, and sites to evaluate the above programs and prevent their capture by the Soviet Union. Alsos personnel followed close behind the front lines in Italy, France, and Germany, occasionally crossing into enemy-held territory to secure valuable resources before they could be destroyed or scientists escape or fall into rival hands.

The Alsos Mission was commanded by Colonel Boris Pash, a former Manhattan Project security officer, with Samuel Goudsmit as chief scientific advisor. It was jointly staffed by the Office of Naval Intelligence (ONI), the Office of Scientific Research and Development (OSRD), the Manhattan Project, and Army Intelligence (G-2), with field assistance from combat engineers assigned to specific task forces.

Alsos teams were successful in locating and removing a substantial portion of the German research effort's surviving records and equipment. They also took most of the senior German research personnel into custody, including Otto Hahn, Max von Laue, Werner Heisenberg and Carl Friedrich von Weizsäcker. By November–December 1944, they had concluded that there was no threat of a German atomic bomb, and that the German nuclear program had only reached an experimental phase, not a production phase. After the defeat of Japan, an Alsos mission was sent in to evaluate its nuclear program as well.

== Origin ==
The Manhattan Project was the Allied nuclear weapons research-and-development program, operated during and immediately after World War II, led by the United States with contributions principally from the United Kingdom and Canada. Brigadier General Leslie Groves of the U.S. Army Corps of Engineers became its director in September 1942. The project operated under a tight blanket of security lest its discovery induce Axis powers, particularly Germany, to accelerate their own nuclear projects or to undertake covert operations against the project.

Allied work on nuclear fission had been motivated by scientists, many of whom were refugees from Nazi Germany, who feared a German atomic bomb program was underway. The discovery of fission had taken place largely in Otto Hahn's Berlin laboratory, and many scientists in the United States held the work of German scientists, especially Werner Heisenberg, in high regard. Fear that they were in a "race" for the atomic bomb was one of the main reasons for the establishment of the Manhattan Project and acceleration of the Allied effort. The Chancellor of Germany, Adolf Hitler, frequently claimed that Germany was developing secret weapons, and it was feared that these might include nuclear weapons. Reports of German nuclear activity were taken seriously. At the instigation of the Manhattan Project, Norwegian saboteurs and Allied bombers attacked heavy-water infrastructure in German-occupied Norway in late 1942 and early 1943.

Following the September 1943 Allied invasion of Italy, Brigadier General Wilhelm D. Styer, Chief of Staff of Army Service Forces, was concerned that intelligence activities related to foreign nuclear energy programs were not being properly coordinated. He feared that important items might be overlooked unless those responsible were properly briefed, yet at the same time wished to minimize the number of personnel with access to such secret information. Having the Manhattan Project itself take over responsibility for coordinating these efforts would address both these concerns. Accordingly, he approached Groves on behalf of General George Marshall, the Chief of Staff of the Army, with that recommendation.

In response, Groves created the Alsos Mission, a small team jointly staffed by the Office of Naval Intelligence (ONI), the Office of Scientific Research and Development (OSRD), the Manhattan Project, and Army Intelligence (G-2). Its assignment was to investigate enemy scientific developments, including nuclear weapons research. Groves was not pleased with the codename (derived from ἄλσος, the Greek word for "grove"), but decided that changing it would only draw unwanted attention.

The Chief of Army Intelligence, Major General George V. Strong, appointed Lieutenant Colonel Boris Pash to command the unit. Pash had served as the head of the Counter Intelligence Branch of the Western Defense Command, where he had investigated suspected Soviet espionage at the Radiation Laboratory at Berkeley. Pash's command comprised his executive officer Captain Wayne B. Stanard, four Counter Intelligence Corps (CIC) agents, four interpreters, and four scientists: Dr. James B. Fisk from the Bell Telephone Company, Dr. John R. Johnson from Cornell University, Commander Bruce Old from the Office of Naval Intelligence (ONI) and the Massachusetts Institute of Technology (MIT), and Major William Allis, originally from MIT although then serving on the War Department scientific staff.

The Manhattan Project intelligence staff believed that the Japanese atomic program was not far advanced because Japan had little access to uranium ore, the industrial effort required exceeded Japan's capacity, and, according to American physicists at the University of California, Berkeley, who knew the leading Japanese physicists personally, there were too few Japanese qualified to work in the area.

== Italy ==
In December 1943, the Alsos Mission reached Algiers, where Pash reported to the Chief of Staff at Allied Force Headquarters (AFHQ), Major General Walter B. Smith, and his British Chief of Intelligence, Brigadier Kenneth Strong. This was awkward as Pash's instructions were not to give the British information about the Alsos Mission, but it turned out that Strong was already fully aware of it. It was arranged that Pash would deal with Strong's American deputy, Colonel Thomas E. Roderick. The Alsos Mission then moved on to Italy, where it was assigned to Major General Kenyon A. Joyce's Allied Control Commission. Pash met with Marshal of Italy Pietro Badoglio, the man who had negotiated Italy's surrender to the Allies, and was now head of the Italian Provisional Military Government, who gave him a letter of introduction addressed to Italian civil and military authorities.

Alsos interviewed the Italian Minister for Communications, the Chief of Naval Ordnance, the staff of the Italian Naval Academy, and Italian scientists at the University of Naples, and examined what captured technical documents could be found. There was little information about developments in northern Italy and Germany. The Alsos Mission was attached to Colonel George Smith's S-Force. Built around a Royal Air Force ground reconnaissance squadron equipped with armored cars, this unit contained American, British, French, and Italian technical specialists of various kinds who would enter Rome on the heels of the advancing Allied forces. The expectation that Rome would soon be captured proved premature, and by March 1944 most of the Alsos Mission had returned to the United States. The Alsos Mission had gathered little of value about nuclear matters, but submitted detailed reports about German rockets and guided missiles.

Rome fell on 4 June 1944. When the news came that its fall was imminent, Pash was ordered from London to Italy. He flew back to Italy and entered the city with S-Force on 5 June. Pash took key scientists into custody and arranged for sites targeted by Alsos, including the University of Rome and the Consiglio Nazionale delle Ricerche, to be secured. The Alsos Mission to Italy was reconstituted under the command of Pash's deputy, Major Richard C. Ham, and Johnson and Major Robert R. Furman were sent from the United States to join him. They reached Rome on 19 June, and over the next weeks interviewed scientists including Edoardo Amaldi, Gian-Carlo Wick, and Francesco Giordani. The picture that the Alsos Mission built up indicated that the German effort was not far advanced.

== Western Europe ==
=== Britain ===
In December 1943, Groves sent Furman to Britain to discuss the establishment of a London Liaison Office for the Manhattan Project with the British government, and to confer over coordinating the intelligence effort. Lieutenant Commander Eric Welsh, the head of the Norwegian Section of MI6, was unimpressed with Furman's grasp of the subject matter. Groves selected the head of the Manhattan District's security activities, Captain Horace K. Calvert, as head of the London Liaison Office, with the title of Assistant Military Attaché. Working in cooperation with Welsh and Michael Perrin from Tube Alloys, the London Liaison Office consisted of Calvert, Captain George B. Davis, two Women's Army Corps clerks and three CIC agents.

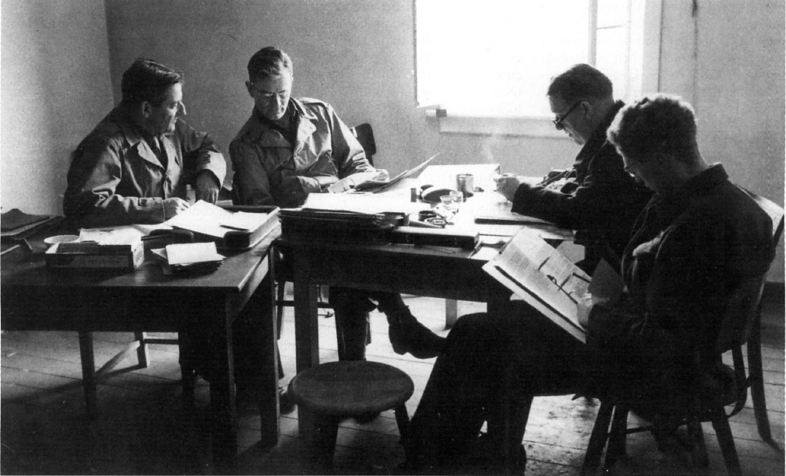
Alsos members Goudsmit, Wardenburg, Welsh and Cecil

The Liaison Office interviewed European refugee scientists and studied German physics journals. It compiled lists of German scientists of interest and possible locations of nuclear research and industrial facilities, and the mining and stockpiling of uranium and thorium ores. Little thorium was available in Germany or German-occupied Europe, and attention soon centered on the mines at Joachimsthal in Sudetenland (the German-annexed part of Czechoslovakia). Aerial reconnaissance was carried out periodically, and production was measured by assessing the size of the piles of tailings.

Groves warned General Dwight D. Eisenhower of the possibility that the Germans might disrupt the Normandy landings with radioactive poisons, and sent Major Arthur V. Peterson to brief his chief of staff, Lieutenant General Walter B. Smith. Under the codename Operation Peppermint, special equipment was prepared and Chemical Warfare Service teams were trained in its use. The British forces made similar preparations for their beaches. The precautions were unnecessary.

Meanwhile, the new head of G-2, Major General Clayton L. Bissell, at the urging of Groves and Furman, decided to create a new, even larger Alsos Mission for western Europe in March 1944. Pash assumed command of the new unit upon its official creation by the Secretary of War, Henry L. Stimson, on 4 April. The military staff for the new mission were selected by Bissell on Pash's advice. Lieutenant Colonel George R. Eckman became the deputy commander. Captain Henry A. Schade was appointed as the head of the naval contingent. Groves and Vannevar Bush, the head of OSRD, selected the scientific staff, and appointed Samuel Goudsmit, a University of Michigan physicist with a good command of several western European languages, as its head. Goudsmit had not been working on the Manhattan Project, and therefore could not reveal any of its secrets if captured. The British considered creating their own rival mission, but in the end agreed to participate as a junior partner. Three Dutch and one Norwegian officer also served with the Alsos Mission. By the end of August it had seven officers and 33 scientists.

=== France ===
On 5 August, Pash received a secret message from Washington, D.C., reporting that the French physicist Frédéric Joliot-Curie had been sighted at his holiday home at L'Arcouest in Brittany. Joliot-Curie was at the top of Alsos's wanted list, so Pash and CIC Special Agent Gerry Beatson set out to investigate in the wake of the advancing U.S. Third Army. On 11 August they reached the homes of Joliot-Curie, Francis Perrin, and Pierre Auger in the L'Arcouest area. Pash and Beatson got there the morning of 17 August with Task Force A, and they were directed to Joliot-Curie's house, which had been emptied by the Germans. They searched the University of Rennes and found some documents there on 21 August.

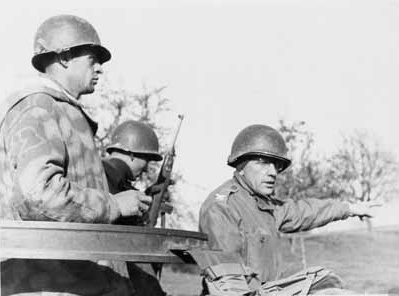
Boris Pash (right) during Operation Harborage in April 1945 in Hechingen

The rest of the advance party of the Alsos Mission moved to Normandy in August 1944, where it joined T-Force, a similar formation to S-Force, at Rambouillet, where it was preparing for the liberation of Paris. An Alsos Mission team including Pash and Calvert reached Joliot-Curie's house in the Paris suburbs on 24 August to find that he was not there, but at his laboratory at the Collège de France. The next day they reached the Porte d'Orléans where they encountered troops of the French 2e Division Blindée, who were engaged in liberating the city, and came under small arms fire from the German defenders. The Alsos Mission replied with their M1 carbines and Thompson submachine guns as they made their way through the back streets to the college, where they found Joliot-Curie in his office.

Goudsmit interviewed Joliot-Curie in Paris on 27 August. Accompanied by Calvert, Joliot-Curie was flown to London where Perrin and Goudsmit interviewed him about the activities of German scientists. Joliot-Curie recalled visits to the College, which had a cyclotron, by German scientists including Erich Schumann, who had initiated the German nuclear project, and controlled it until it had been handed over to the Reichsforschungsrat (National Research Council) in 1942; by Abraham Esau, who had been in charge of nuclear physics under the Reichsforschungsrat; and by Walter Gerlach, who had replaced him in January 1944. Other German physicists who had used the facilities included Kurt Diebner, Walther Bothe, and Erich Bagge, all of whom were known to be associated with the German nuclear project.

Meanwhile, T-Force had moved into the Petit Palais. The main body of the Alsos Mission soon followed, and the Mission opened an office at the Place de l'Opéra. On 5 September, word was received that the British 21st Army Group was about to enter Brussels. There were two important Alsos Mission objectives in Belgium: the corporate headquarters of Union Minière du Haut Katanga, the world's largest supplier of uranium ore, in Antwerp, and its uranium processing plant in Olen. A six-man Alsos Mission team set out to secure them, led by Pash and the Assistant Chief of Staff, G-2, at ETOUSA, Colonel G. Bryan Conrad.

On reaching Brussels, they made contact with Lieutenant Colonel David Strangeways, the commander of R Force, who provided them with an escort of Royal Air Force armored vehicles. They entered Antwerp on 7 September and found the office of Union Minière. They discovered that over 1,000 tons of refined uranium had been sent to Germany, but about 150 tons still remained at Olen. They set out for Olen, where they located 68 tons, but another 80 tons were missing, having been shipped to France in 1940 ahead of the German invasion of Belgium. The capture of Eindhoven by the U.S. 101st Airborne Division allowed early access to another high priority target, the Philips plant there. Brigadier Edgar Williams, the 21st Army Group's Chief of Intelligence, facilitated the Alsos Mission's detour to Eindhoven, where it was able to interview Dutch scientists. Williams also furnished a detachment of Royal Engineers to transport and move the uranium from Olen. Groves had it shipped to England, and, ultimately, to the United States.

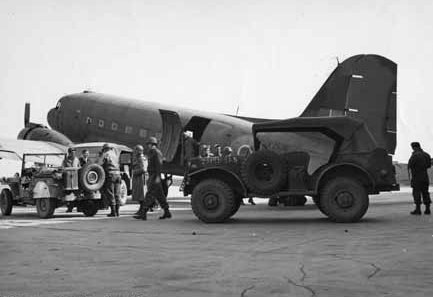
Alsos Mission personnel returned from Stadtilm on an RAF Dakota, indicating the bipartisanship of its activity.

The Alsos Mission now attempted to recover the shipment that had been sent to France. Documentation was discovered that said that part of it had been sent to Toulouse. An Alsos Mission team under Pash's command reached Toulouse on 1 October and inspected a French Army arsenal. They used a Geiger counter to find barrels containing 31 tons of the uranium from Belgium. Conrad persuaded Major General Frank S. Ross to release the U.S. 3342nd Quartermaster Truck Company from the Red Ball Express to retrieve the shipment. The barrels were collected and transported to Marseille, where they were loaded on a ship bound for the United States. During the loading process a barrel fell into the water and had to be retrieved by a Navy diver. In Marseilles, the Alsos Mission detachment also met up with the detachment that had been sent to Italy, which now rejoined them. The remaining 49 tons of the original shipment to France were never found.

Information gathered in Rennes, Paris, and Eindhoven pointed to Strasbourg as a place of particular interest. Physicists Rudolf Fleischmann and Carl Friedrich von Weizsäcker were known to be working at the University of Strasbourg, as was Eugen Haagen, an expert on viruses whose work was of great concern to the Alsos Mission's Biological Warfare section. The Naval section was interested in the torpedo research being carried out there, and jet engine development was being undertaken at Strasbourg's Junkers plant.

On 22 November, the U.S. Sixth Army Group notified the Alsos Mission that the capture of Strasbourg was imminent, and it should join T-Force in Saarburg, where it was preparing to enter the city. The Alsos Mission joined T-Force in Strasbourg on 25 November. The German nuclear laboratory was discovered on the grounds of the Strasbourg Hospital, where the physicists attempted to pass themselves off as medics. Fleischmann was taken into custody, but Weizsäcker and Haagen had fled the city.

Documents discovered in Weizsäcker's office, Fleischmann's laboratory and the Strasbourg Hospital pointed to nuclear activities taking place at Stadtilm, Haigerloch, Hechingen, and Tailfingen (today part of Albstadt). After establishing its headquarters in Haagen's office Alsos staff uncovered documents concerning secret medical experiments at Natzweiler concentration camp. These indicated the Germans had been unable to develop a practical process for uranium enrichment. For the first time the Alsos Mission was able to categorically report that a German nuclear weapon was not a threat, as it had never gotten to a production phase. As Goudsmit put it later: "The conclusions were unmistakable. The evidence at hand proved definitely that Germany had no atom bomb and was not likely to have one in any reasonable time."

=== Germany ===
When the German Operation Nordwind offensive threatened Strasbourg, Pash ordered all captured documents to be removed. Papers indicating the nature of the Alsos Mission were removed or destroyed. Although Strasbourg was not abandoned by the Allies, and ultimately did not fall, the Alsos Mission departed the city on 8 January 1945. Pash even ordered an evacuation plan to be prepared for the Alsos Mission's main headquarters in Paris. The embarrassing series of intelligence failures that had led up to the Battle of the Bulge cast doubts on the Alsos Mission's own findings. A four-man team under Eckman was sent to investigate a suspiciously devastating V-2 explosion near Antwerp, and Fred Wardenburg had to confirm that it was not a small nuclear explosion.

Rumors that Germany had an atomic bomb persisted as late as March 1945, but all signs pointed to the lack of a production program. On March 16, Groves wrote to Bissell that "the most complete and factual information we have obtained bearing on the nature of the German effort in our field"— the results of the Strasbourg mission — "tends to confirm our conclusion that the Germans are now behind us."

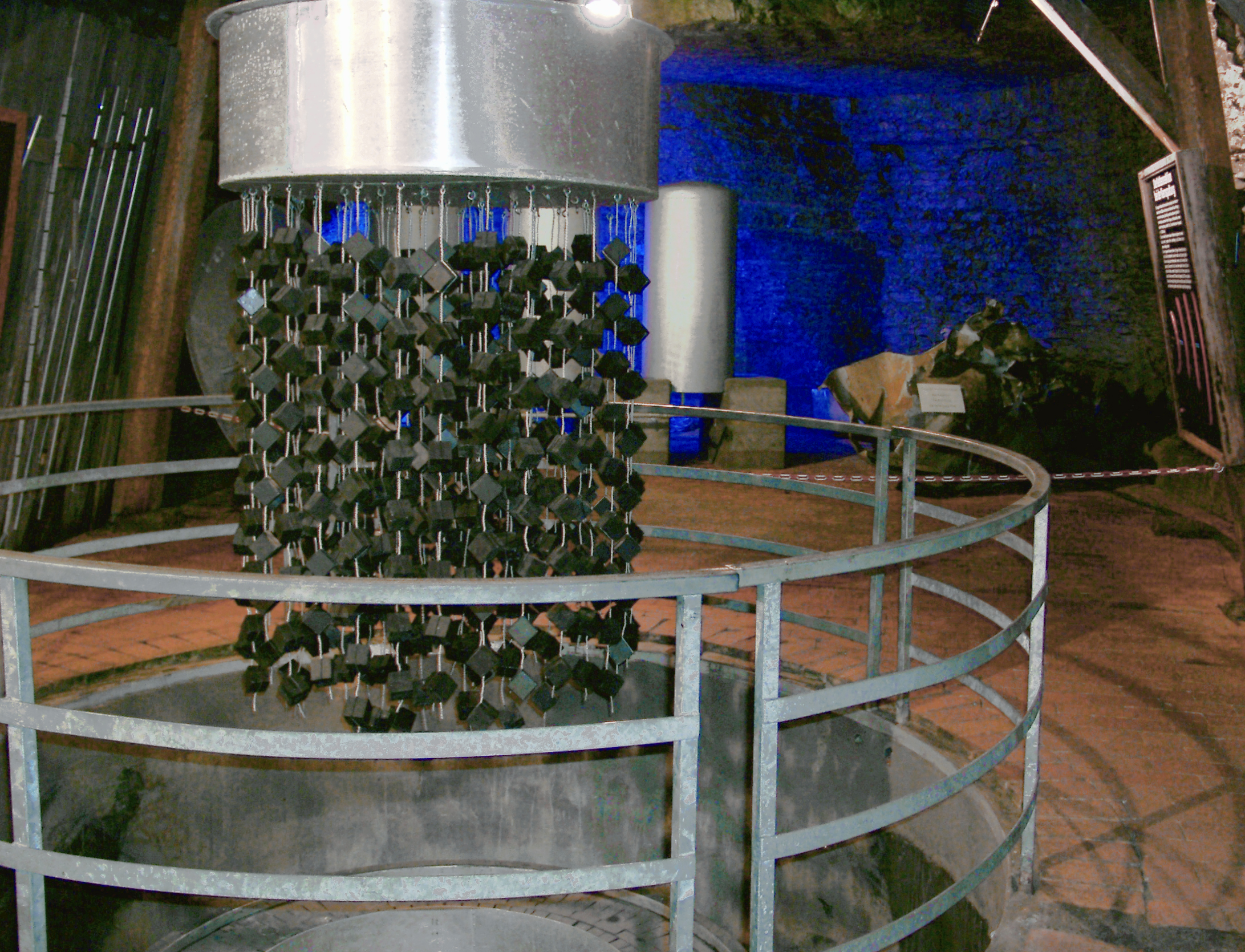
Replica of the German experimental nuclear reactor captured and dismantled at Haigerloch during Operation Big

A new forward headquarters, Alsos Forward North (AFwdN), was opened at Aachen, and on 8 February the Alsos Mission reopened its forward headquarters in Strasbourg as Alsos Forward South (AFwdS). In March, the U.S. Twelfth Army Group launched Operation Lumberjack, an offensive to clear the Germans west of the Rhine. Pash, who was promoted to colonel on 6 March, led an Alsos Mission detachment into Cologne on 7 March, but little additional information was found.

The interrogation of German prisoners indicated that uranium and thorium were being processed in Germany, mostly at the Auergesellschaft plant at Oranienburg, so Groves arranged for the plant to be bombed on 15 March 1945. Some 612 B-17 Flying Fortresses of the U.S. Eighth Air Force dropped 1,500 tons of high explosive and 178 tons of incendiary bombs on the plant.

On 30 March, the Alsos Mission reached Heidelberg, where important scientists were captured including Walther Bothe, Richard Kuhn, Philipp Lenard, and Wolfgang Gertner. Their interrogation revealed that Otto Hahn was at his laboratory in Tailfingen, while Werner Heisenberg and Max von Laue were at Heisenberg's laboratory in Hechingen, and the experimental natural uranium reactor that Heisenberg's team had built in Berlin had been moved to Haigerloch. Henceforth, the main focus of the Alsos Mission was on these nuclear facilities in the Württemberg area.

In April 1945 a four-man team under Hugh Montgomery uncovered the Buchenwald concentration camp and broke secrecy protocol to request medical help. The team was searching for a German nuclear physicist near Weimar, eastern Germany.

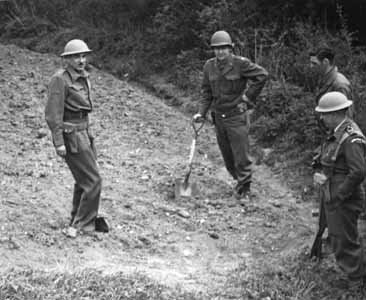
Michael Perrin, John Lansdale Jr., Samuel Goudsmit, and Eric Welsh search for uranium in a field at Haigerloch, Germany. Despite appearances, a German technician did the digging so as to avoid the danger from booby traps.

As the Allied armies advanced into Germany in April 1945, Alsos Mission teams searched Stadtilm, where they found documentation concerning the German nuclear program, components of a nuclear reactor, and eight tons of uranium oxide. Scientists captured at Göttingen and Katlenburg-Lindau included Werner Osenberg, the chief of the planning board of the Reichsforschungsrat, and Fritz Houtermans, who provided information about the Soviet atomic bomb project. At Celle, the Alsos Mission uncovered an experimental centrifuge for separating uranium isotopes, the result of work undertaken at the University of Hamburg by a team under Paul Harteck.

The problem with the targets in the Württemberg area was that they not only lay in the path of the French First Army's advance, but were also in the occupation zone allocated to France. Groves attempted to get the occupation boundaries changed, but the State Department wanted to know why first, and Groves refused to provide this information. Groves, Marshall, and Stimson then decided that the area would have to be secured by American troops that would carry off what they could and destroy everything else. Pash was sent to ask General Jacob Devers, the commander of the U.S. Sixth Army Group, if the zones of the French First Army and the U.S. Seventh Army could be swapped around. He was informed that the matter would have to be taken up with Eisenhower.

Groves dispatched Lieutenant Colonel John Lansdale Jr. to Europe, where he participated in a meeting with Lieutenant General Bedell Smith and Major General Harold Bull of SHAEF; Major General Elbridge Chapman, the commander of the U.S. 13th Airborne Division; Pash, Furman, and Goudsmit of Alsos; and Brigadier General Reuben E. Jenkins from the Sixth Army Group. The plan, codenamed Operation Effective, called for the 13th Airborne Division to occupy the area to prevent its capture by the French, and seize an airfield that could be used to fly in an Alsos Mission team, and later to fly it out, along with captured German scientists. Operation Effective was scheduled for 22 April. Meanwhile, Devers took steps to delay the French advance.

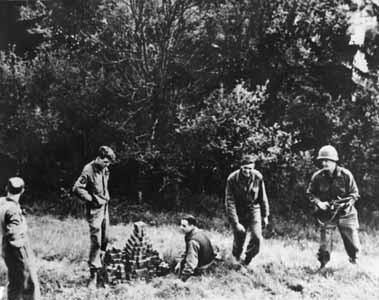
Members of the Alsos Mission uncover uranium cubes hidden in the field in Haigerloch. Left to right: James A. Lane, unknown, Marte Previti, Harold Brown, Walter A. Parish.

The Alsos Mission had learned that the uranium ores that had been taken from Belgium in 1944 had been shipped to the Wirtschaftliche Forschungsgesellschaft (WiFO) plant in Staßfurt. The 83rd Infantry Division captured this on 15 April. As it was in the occupation zone allocated to the Soviet Union at the Yalta Conference, the Alsos Mission, led by Pash and accompanied by Lansdale, Perrin and Air Commodore Sir Charles Hambro, arrived on 17 April to remove anything of interest. Over the following ten days, 260 truckloads of uranium ore, sodium uranate and ferrouranium weighing about 1,000 tons, were taken away by an African-American truck company. The uranium was taken to Hildesheim and most of it was flown to the United Kingdom by the Royal Air Force; the rest had to be moved to Antwerp by train and loaded onto a ship to England.

On 20 April, the French First Army captured an intact bridge over the Neckar River at Horb and established a bridgehead. It was decided to send in a force on the ground instead of Operation Effective, which was cancelled on 19 April. This time, instead of following or accompanying the front-line troops, the Alsos Mission would operate behind enemy lines. The Alsos Mission had taken delivery of two armored cars, four jeeps with machine gun mounts, and two .50 caliber machine guns. The other two jeeps would carry captured German machine guns. They would be accompanied by three unarmed jeeps. For the operation, codenamed Operation Big, Pash would command a special force called Task Force A, built around his Alsos Mission team and the U.S. 1269th Engineer Combat Battalion commanded by Lieutenant Colonel Wilbur White, less its Company B. Sir Charles Hambro decided to accompany the Alsos Mission with a British group that included Michael Perrin, David Gattiker, Eric Welsh, and Rupert Cecil. Lansdale accompanied Task Force A as Groves' representative, and Brigadier General Eugene L. Harrison, the G-2 from the Sixth Army Group, as Devers' representative.

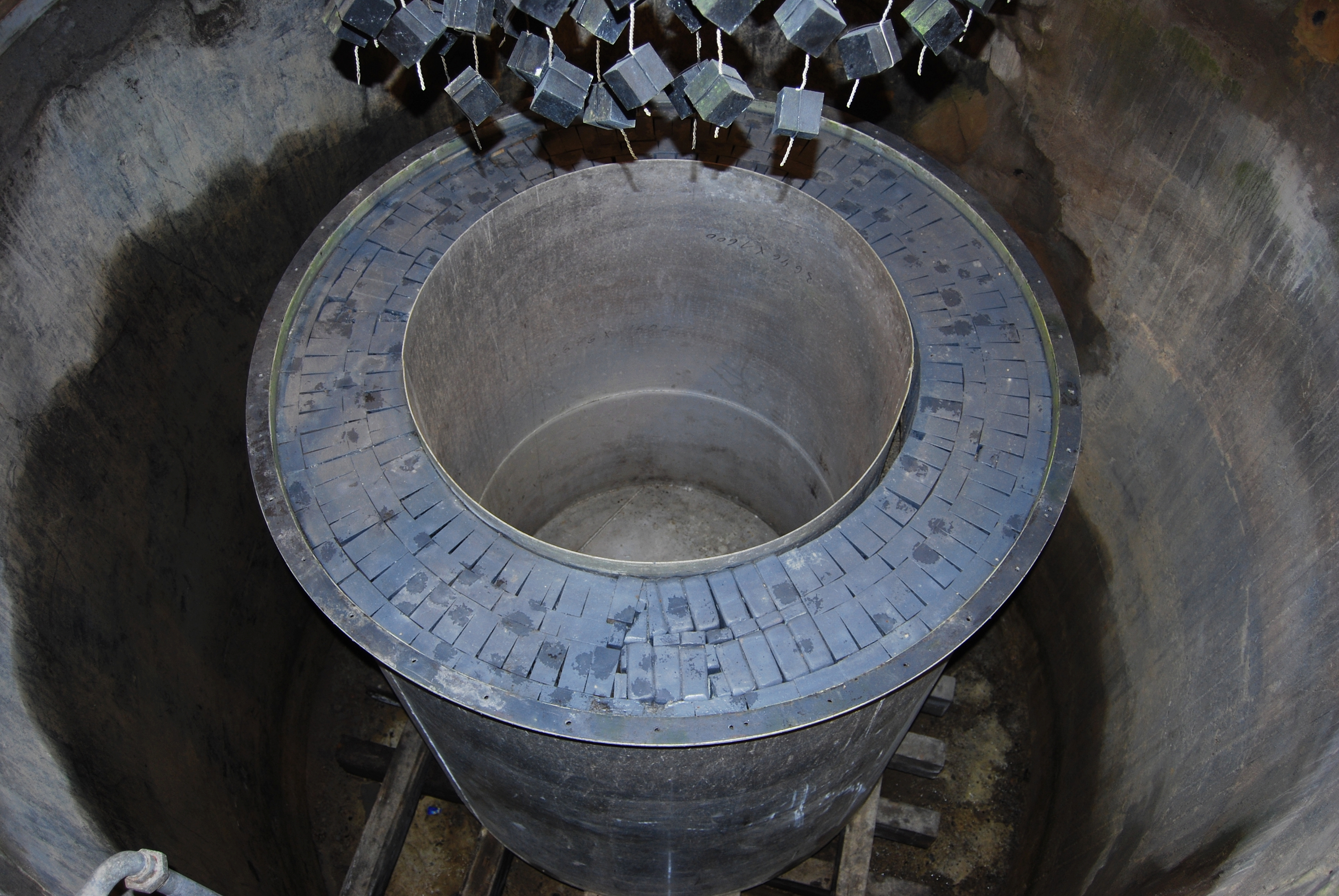
Replica of the German experimental nuclear reactor at Haigerloch captured by the Alsos team and shipped back to the U.S.

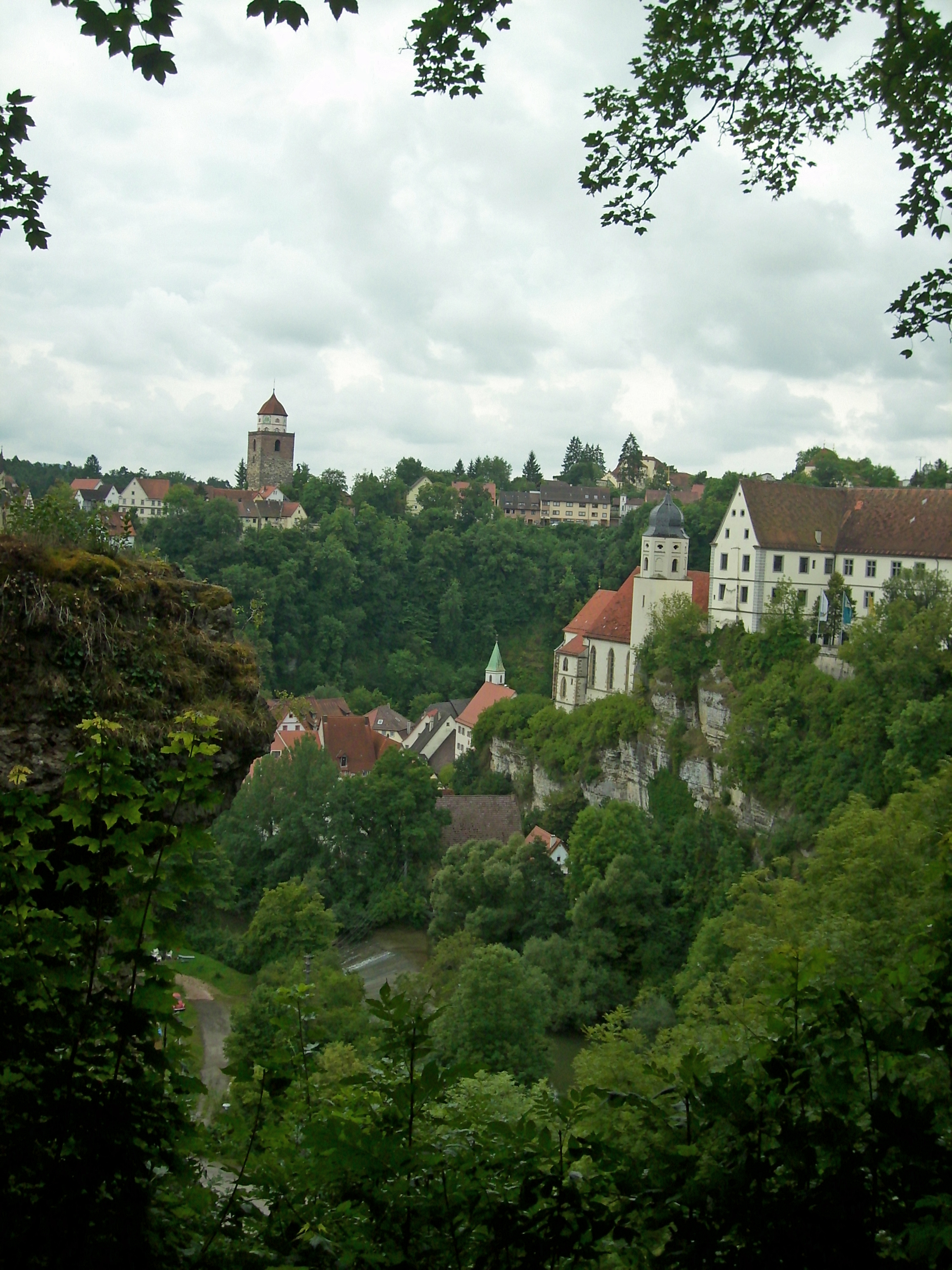
The Haigerloch Castle Hill. The cellar was located under the church on river level.

The Alsos Mission set out on 20 April and rendezvoused with the 1269th Engineer Combat Battalion at Freudenstadt. The intact bridge over the Neckar River at Horb was crossed and Haigerloch was occupied without opposition on 22 April. The main body of Task Force A arrived on 23 April. In a laboratory in a cellar they found a German experimental nuclear reactor shaped like a cylinder and made of graphite blocks, but the uranium and heavy water were missing. The scientists immediately began dismantling it. Pash left Hambro in charge, while he led troops of Task Force A to Bisingen, and then on to Hechingen, where 25 scientists were captured, including Weizsäcker, Laue, Karl Wirtz, Horst Korsching and Erich Bagge. At Tailfingen they took Otto Hahn and nine members of his staff into custody. At Haigerloch, a sealed drum of documents was retrieved from a cesspool, and three drums of heavy water and 1.5 tons of uranium ingots were found buried in a field. The uranium and heavy water were loaded onto trucks. The apertures in the cellar were blown up with minor explosions to prevent their capture by the French.

Werner Heisenberg, "Germany's Oppenheimer" according to Gregg Herken, remained at large, having left Hechingen on 19 April. On 1 May, Pash set out in pursuit of Heisenberg with ten men in the two armored cars and two jeeps. They teamed up with the 36th Reconnaissance Troop of the U.S. 36th Infantry Division and entered Urfeld on 2 May, where Pash found Heisenberg at his home. The Americans became involved in firefights with German troops attempting to enter the town, and the 36th Reconnaissance Troop had to head off on another mission, leaving Pash with just seven men. Fortunately, the German force, which numbered about 700, offered to surrender. Pash returned on 3 May with the 3rd Battalion, 142nd Infantry, which took them prisoner, while Pash and his Alsos Mission team took Heisenberg into custody.

By VE Day, the Alsos Mission had a strength of 114 men and women. It was officially disbanded on 15 October 1945.

=== Operation Epsilon ===
German scientists that had been captured by the Alsos Mission were held in several camps, separate from other prisoners of war. After VE Day, SHAEF decided to concentrate them in an internment camp at Kransberg Castle, codenamed "Dustbin", as part of Operation Epsilon. At Welsh's instigation, ten of the nuclear physicists, Bagge, Diebner, Gerlach, Hahn, Harteck, Heisenberg, Korsching, von Laue, von Weizsäcker and Wirtz, were brought to England. They were accommodated between 3 July 1945 and 3 January 1946 at Farm Hall, a house in Godmanchester, near Cambridge. The premises were thoroughly bugged to determine how close the German nuclear project had been to constructing an atomic bomb by listening in to their conversations and transcripts of their conversations were sent to Groves. The most interesting conversations occurred after they received the news of the atomic bombing of Hiroshima and Nagasaki, when they struggled to comprehend how the Allies had done what they could not.

== Japan ==
Plans for the invasion of Japan incorporated an Alsos Mission. Japanese fire balloon attacks on the United States had aroused fears that the technique might be used in combination with biological agents, which the Japanese Unit 731 was known to be experimenting with. In March 1945, the physicist and seismologist L. Don Leet was appointed as head of the scientific section of the Alsos Mission to Japan. Leet had previously worked with the Manhattan Project on the Trinity nuclear test. Plans were drawn up to prepare and equip a T-Force along the lines of the one in Europe, but made up of personnel already in the Pacific. The mission differed from its European counterpart in that it was solely American and consisted of only one intelligence agency. Responsibility for nuclear matters was subsequently handled by a separate Manhattan Project Intelligence Group organized by Groves.

Leet's group reached Manila in July 1945, where they met with the intelligence staff of General of the Army Douglas MacArthur's Army Forces, Pacific. Following the surrender of Japan the mission traveled to Japan and visited various research establishments including Tokyo Imperial University, Waseda University, Tokyo Institute of Technology, the Institute of Physical and Chemical Research, the Institute for Materials Research, Tokyo Shibaura Denki (Toshiba), the Japan Society for the Promotion of Science, the National Research Council, and the Board of Technology. The mission, which included Karl Compton, interviewed over 300 Japanese scientists and produced reports on Japanese research into radar, rockets, and other developments, including chemical and biological warfare. The Manhattan Project Intelligence Group, under the command of Philip Morrison, arrived in Japan in September 1945 and examined Japan's wartime nuclear weapons program. The group concluded that lack of uranium ore and low priority had doomed the Japanese effort. They reported that, contrary to American belief, Japan's nuclear physicists were competent.

== Legacy ==
After seeing the German project at Haigerloch, Goudsmit wrote that:

It was so obvious the whole German uranium set up was on a ludicrously small scale. Here was the central group of laboratories, and all it amounted to was a little cave, a wing of a small textile factory, a few rooms in an old brewery. To be sure, the laboratories were well equipped, but compared to what we were doing in the United States it was still small-time stuff. Sometimes we wondered if our government had not spent more money on our intelligence mission than the Germans had spent on their whole project.

In the end, the Alsos Mission contributed little to the Allied defeat of Nazi Germany, because the German nuclear and biological weapons programs that it had been formed to investigate turned out to be smaller and less threatening than had been feared. In the field of nuclear weapons development at least, the underfunded and disorganized German program lagged far behind the Allies' own efforts. In its appropriation of the accomplishments of European science, the Alsos Mission played a small part in the wartime and subsequent scientific and technological developments that characterized and transformed the postwar world.

== See also ==
- Norwegian heavy water sabotage
- Operation Paperclip
- Russian Alsos
