= Korsch =

Korsch is the name of:

- Karl Korsch (1886–1961), German communist
- Peter Korsch, East German sprint canoer
- Mount Korsch, pyramidal peak; named 1988 after a geologist Russell J. Korsch
- Korsch telescope, a three-mirror telescope

== See also ==
- Korsch AG, German mechanical engineering company, manufacturer of tablet presses
- Körsch Viaduct, Körsch Valley
- Horst Korsching (1912–1998), German physicist
- Korsh
- Korzh (Russian: Корж)

Related surnames

- Kürschner, Kirschner
