= Haigerloch atomic pile =

German nuclear reactor test facility

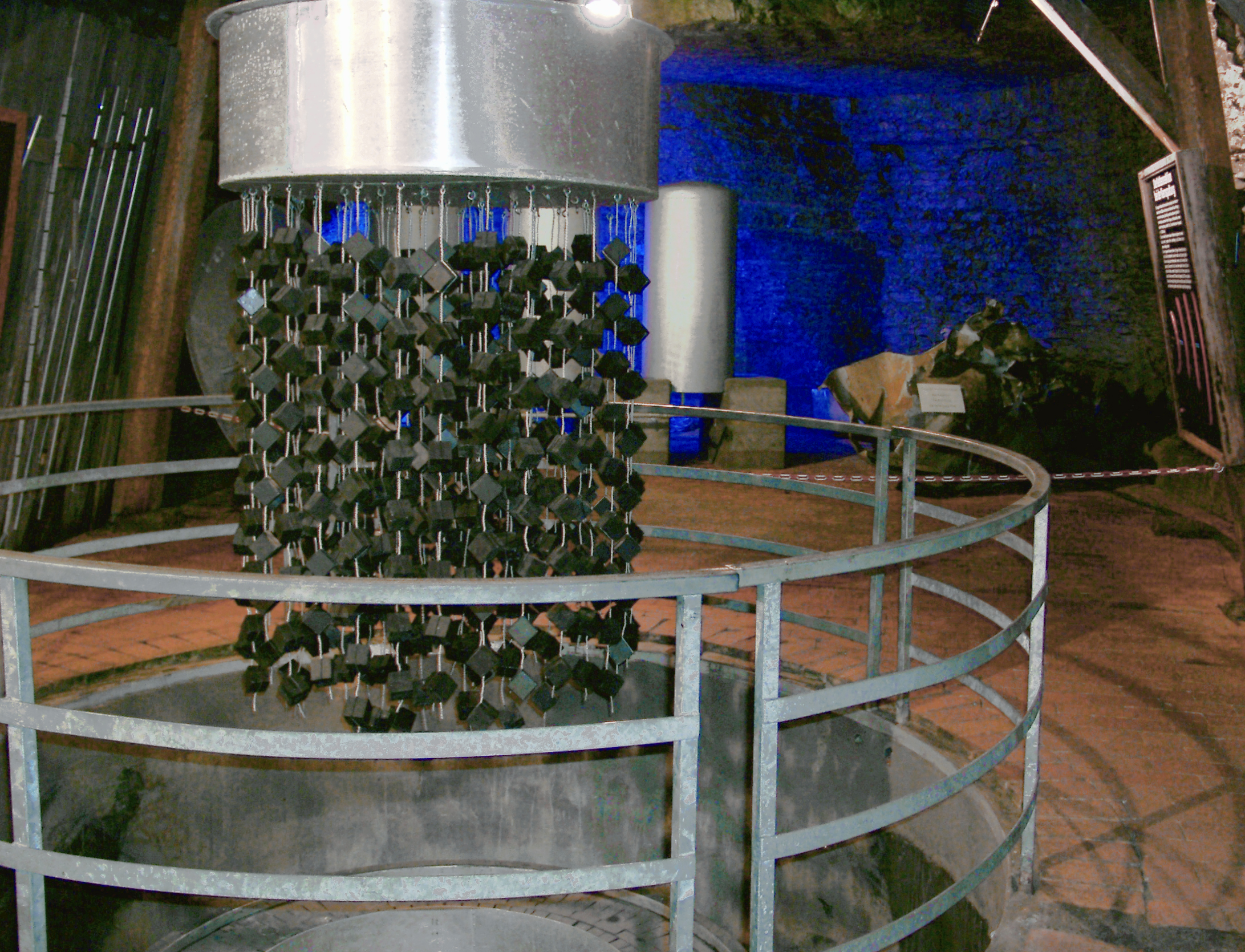
- Reproduction of the pile in the Atomic Cellar Museum
- Coordinates: 48°22′2″N 8°48′15″E

Construction and upkeep
- Construction began: End of February 1945
- Shutdown date: April 24th 1945

Technical specifications
- Fuel type: Heavy water pile

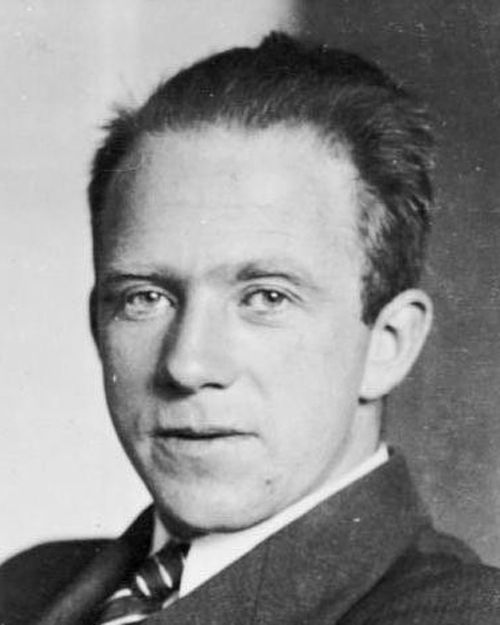
Werner Heisenberg, Director of the Kaiser Wilhelm Institute for Physics from 1942

The Haigerloch atomic pile was a German nuclear research facility. It was built in a rock cellar in Hohenzollerischen Lande, Haigerloch early in 1945 as part of the German nuclear program during World War II.

In this last large-scale experiment of the uranium project with the name B_{8} or B-VIII, as in previous piles, a finite nuclear chain reaction was induced via bombardment of the fuel by a neutron source and measured. Natural uranium was used as fuel and heavy water, graphite, and light water were used as moderators. The criticality of the chain reaction was not achieved; the plant was also not designed for operation in a critical state, and the term reactor often used for it today is therefore only applicable to a limited extent. Later calculations showed that the reactor would have had to be about one and a half times the size to become critical.

The American Special Alsos unit found the facility on April 23, 1945, and dismantled it the following day. The scientists involved were captured and the materials used were flown out to the United States. Today, the Atomic Cellar Museum is located at the former site of the reactor.

== Previous history ==
=== Previous reactor tests ===
The main objective of the German uranium project during the Second World War was the technical utilization of nuclear fission, which had been experimentally researched by Otto Hahn and Fritz Straßmann in 1938 and theoretically explained by Lise Meitner and Otto Frisch. In a series of reactor experiments, known as "large-scale experiments", the aim was to test the theoretical considerations for generating energy from uranium in practice. For this purpose, natural uranium was bombarded with neutrons in heavy water as a moderator and the resulting increase in neutrons was observed. The researchers of the uranium project did not refer to their development goal as a reactor, but as a "uranium machine" or "uranium burner".

- Under the direction of the Nobel Prize winner Werner Heisenberg, a total of seven large-scale experiments called B_{1} to B_{7} were carried out at the Kaiser Wilhelm Institute for Physics (KWIP) in Berlin-Dahlem from 1941 to 1944. The physicists investigated the reactivity of plates of uranium metal of various thicknesses with increasing success.
- At a second location, the Physics Institute of the University of Leipzig, four further experiments L-I to L-IV with concentrically arranged layers of uranium powder and heavy water were carried out by Heisenberg and his colleagues in 1941 and 1942. In experiment L-IV, when neutron multiplication had already been detected, the uranium powder ignited after the formation of an oxyhydrogen gas and the entire facility burned. No persons were injured. The event represents - sensu lato - the first recorded "reactor accident" in history - years before the commercial use of nuclear fission was even conceivable. The experiments in Leipzig were discontinued and only compact metallic uranium was used from then on.
- At the same time, another group was working on similar experiments at the Gottow Experimental Station near Berlin under the direction of Kurt Diebner. In their three experiments G_{1} to G_{3} in 1942 and 1943, uranium cubes were used instead of plates with good results; in addition to heavy water, kerosene was also used as a moderator. The Heisenberg and Diebner groups competed for the scarce materials. In kerosene wax, both the hydrogen and the carbon of the hydrocarbons it contains act as moderators. Even today, neutrons from smaller neutron sources are often slowed down with kerosene. However, attempts to cool/moderate nuclear reactors with organic substances have not yet progressed beyond the experimental stage.

=== Relocation of research ===
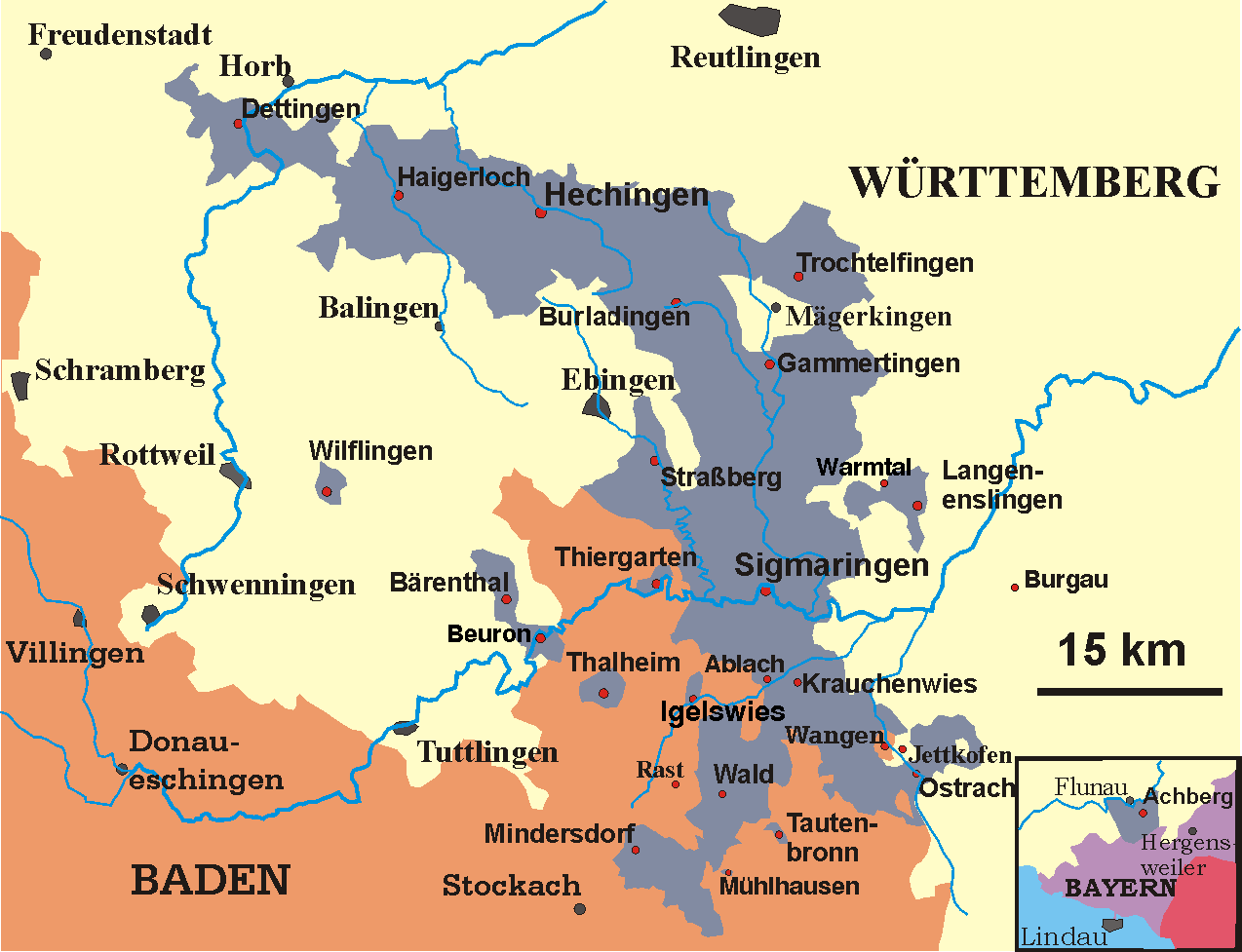
Map of the Hohenzollern lands

In 1943, all major German cities were under threat from Allied bombing raids. As a result, it was decided to relocate the KWIP to a more rural area. The suggestion to use the Hohenzollerische Lande for this probably came from the head of the Physics Division in the Reichsforschungsrat, Walther Gerlach, who had studied at the University of Tübingen and was a professor there in the late 1920s, making him familiar with the area. Another reason for selecting southern Germany was that it had been largely spared from air raids up until then. Additionally, the scientists involved favored this location to reduce the risk of being captured by the Soviets in the event of defeat.

Subsequently, the KWIP was relocated to Hechingen, approximately 15 km from Haigerloch. It was housed in the Grotz and Conzelmann textile factories and in the brewery building of the former Franciscan Monastery of St. Luzen. The relocation occurred in stages: by the end of 1943, about a third of the institute moved to Hechingen, with Carl Friedrich von Weizsäcker and Karl-Heinz Höcker from Strasbourg joining in 1944, and finally Heisenberg relocating there. At the same time, the Kaiser Wilhelm Institute for Chemistry, was relocated to nearby Tailfingen (now part of Albstadt), with prominent scientists such as Otto Hahn and Max von Laue involved in the move.

By January 1945, only Karl Wirtz, Kurt Diebner, and a few technicians remained in Berlin from the Uranverein. Wirtz was setting up the largest German reactor test to date in the still-intact Dahlem institute bunker when the Red Army advanced to within 80 km of Berlin. As a result, Gerlach decided on January 27, 1945, to abandon the almost completed test setup. He immediately traveled to Berlin to evacuate the scientists and materials to southern Germany.

== Preparations ==
=== The Felsenkeller ===
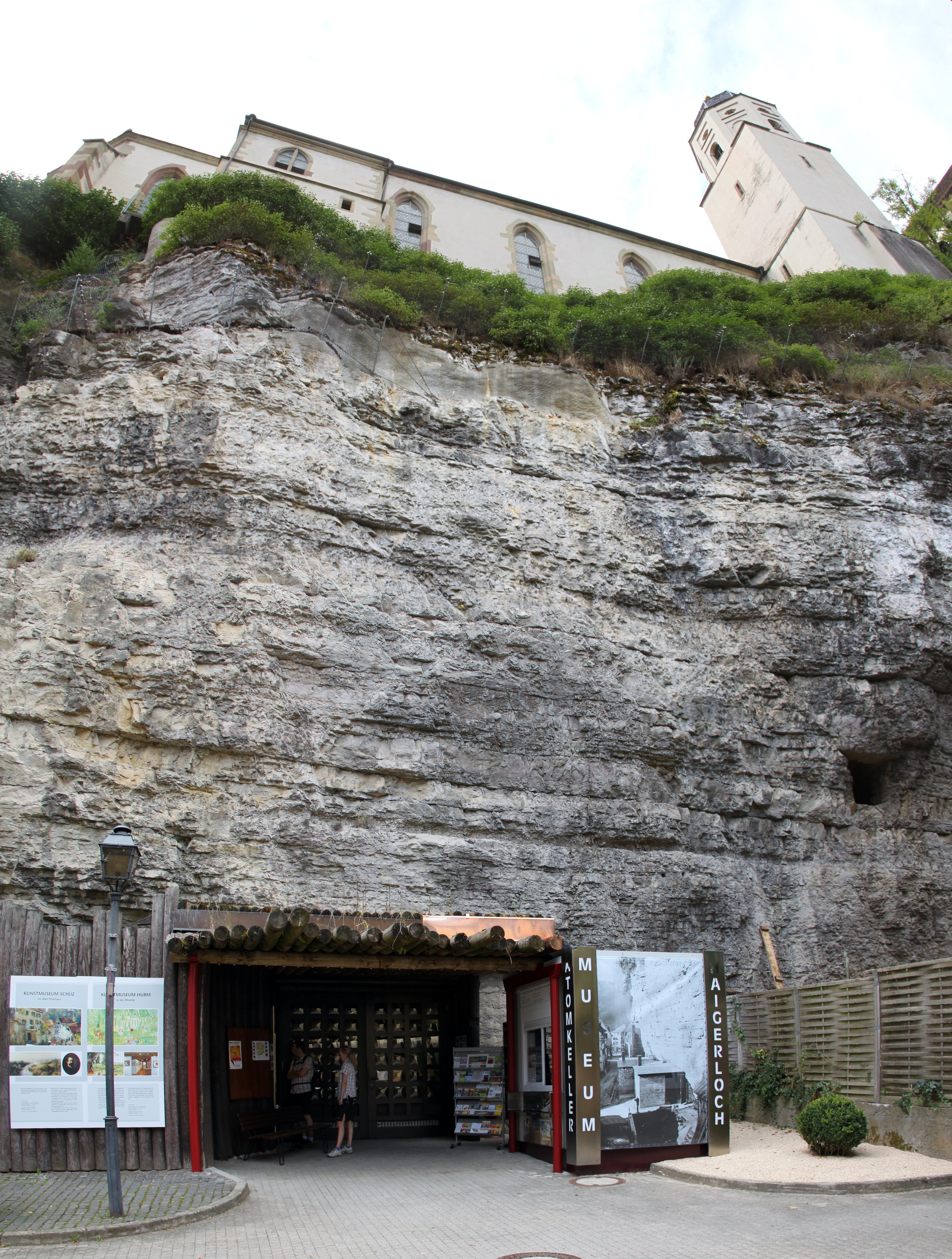
Today's entrance to the rock cellar with the limestone layer above and the castle church

As early as July 29, 1944, the accidentally discovered potato and beer cellar of the Haigerloch Schwanenwirt was rented for 100 Reichsmark per month as the new location of the Berlin research reactor. The Felsenkeller (rock cellar) had been excavated at the beginning of the 20th century as a rail tunnel for the Hohenzollerische Landesbahn. In the narrow Eyachtal valley, it had been driven into the mountain under the Schlosskirche (castle church), with a 20–30 m top layer of shell limestone protecting it against air attacks.

The tunnel was about 20 meters long and three meters high, with a trapezoidal cross-section that meant it was about four meters wide at the ceiling and five meters at floor level. It was supported along its entire length by wooden support beams placed two meters apart. A small two-part porch concealed the entrance.

A three-meter-deep cylindrical pit was excavated for the reactor in the rear part of the rock cellar, a transport crane was installed on the cellar ceiling and a diesel generator was set up in the abandoned beer house on the opposite side of the street. By the end of 1944, the conversion work in the rock cellar, disguised as a "cave research station", had progressed far enough for the construction of the actual reactor to commence.

=== Transportation of materials ===
On January 31, 1945, Gerlach, Wirtz and Diebner left the capital at the head of a small road convoy. They were followed by a number of trucks loaded with several tons of heavy water, uranium, graphite and technical equipment. After a night-time journey over the icy Autobahn, the convoy stopped the following day about 240 kilometers south of Berlin in the small town of Stadtilm in Thuringia where Diebner's working group had been relocated the previous summer. Gerlach believed that Diebner's laboratory was more advanced than Heisenberg's and decided without further ado to unload the materials there. Very annoyed at the change of plan, Wirtz contacted Heisenberg in Hechingen, who immediately set off for Stadtilm together with von Weizsäcker and arrived there three days later after an adventurous journey by bicycle, train and car.

On site, Heisenberg tried to convince Gerlach to take the materials to Haigerloch after all. The two went to Hohenzollern on February 12, 1945 to inspect that site. Wirtz, meanwhile, remained in Stadtilm to ensure that the materials were not used in Diebner's experiments. After Gerlach had ascertained in Haigerloch that the Felsenkeller was better suited as a new location for the reactor, he agreed to the relocation again. Trucks were once again procured and on February 23, 1945, the physicist Erich Bagge set off from Haigerloch with a new convoy to collect the materials from their storage site in Stadtilm.

Four weeks after leaving Berlin, 1.5 tons of uranium, 1.5 tons of heavy water, 10 tons of graphite and a small amount of cadmium finally arrived in Haigerloch at the end of February 1945. The uranium had been mined in Sankt Joachimsthal in the Sudetenland and supplied by the German Degussa corporation. The heavy water had been produced by Norsk Hydro in Norway. In addition, the physicist Fritz Bopp from Berlin had flown in a 500 milligram radium beryllium sample as a neutron source. Over ten tons of uranium oxide as well as small quantities of uranium metal and heavy water remained at Diebner's lab in Stadtilm.

== The research reactor ==
=== The system ===
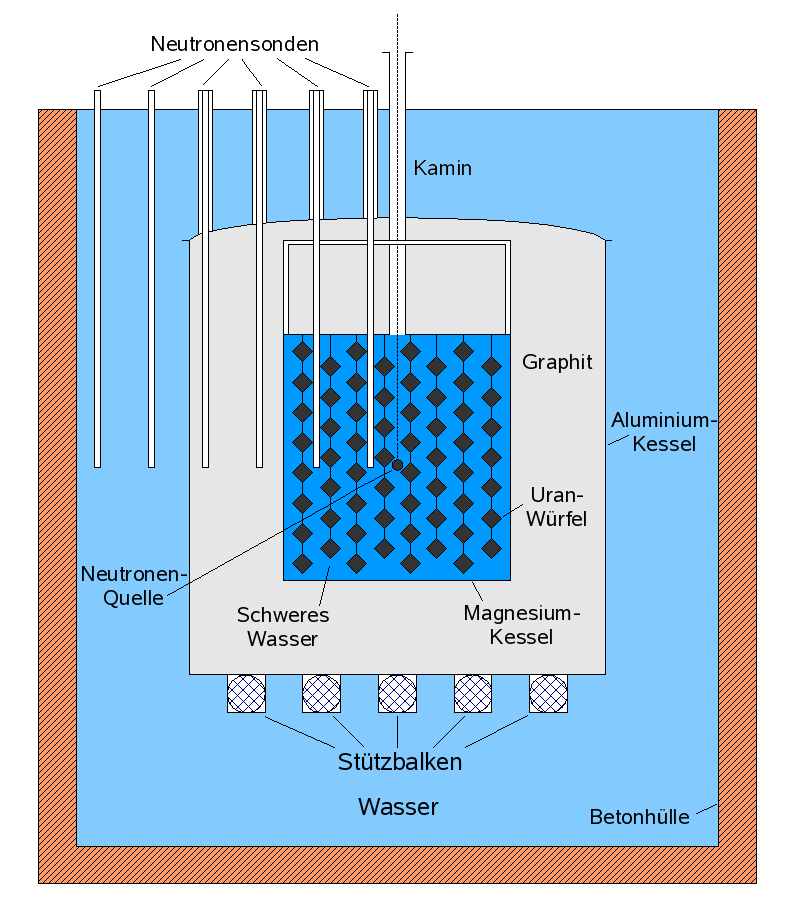
Sketch of the research reactor

The spatial arrangement of the uranium cubes in a face-centered cubic lattice

Once the materials had arrived in Haigerloch, work began immediately on rebuilding the test facility. Von Weizsäcker and Wirtz played a leading role in the construction and experiments. Heisenberg himself managed the project from Hechingen, often cycling back and forth between the two towns. In addition to Bagge and Bopp, other scientists involved in the project on site included Horst Korsching and Erich Fischer.

The outer shell of the reactor consisted of a concrete cylinder fitted with a boiler made of aluminum with a diameter of 210.8 centimeters and a height of 216 centimeters. The boiler rested on wooden support beams on the floor, and the space in between was filled with normal water. A second, smaller boiler sat inside. Made of a very light magnesium alloy, it had a diameter of 124 centimeters and the same height as the outer boiler. The magnesium boiler had already been used in the large-scale test B_{6}, the aluminum boiler had been used for the first time in the large-scale test B_{7}. Both had been manufactured by the Berlin company Bamag-Meguin.

Between the two boilers, ten tons of graphite formed a 43-centimeter layer serving as a neutron reflector and shielding. Graphite had been used as a reflector for the first time in the previous large-scale experiment B_{7}; it had not been used in even earlier experiments because Walther Bothe had estimated in 1941 that graphite would absorb too many neutrons. The lid of the inner boiler consisted of two magnesium plates which also held a graphite layer sandwiched between them.

A total of 664 cubes made of natural uranium with a length of five centimetres and a weight of 2.4 kilograms each were attached to this lid using 78 aluminum wires. 40 wires held nine cubes each and the remaining 38 wires held eight each. The uranium cubes with a total weight of 1.58 tons were lowered into the inner vessel with the help of the crane, and the entire arrangement was sealed with the lid. In the resulting cubic face-centered lattice, the uranium cubes were arranged in the corners and in the centers of the faces of an imaginary space cube, spaced 14 centimeters apart.

The scheme with the staggered uranium cubes had first been tried by Diebner in 1943 in the large-scale test G_{3} at the test facility of the Army Weapons Office in Gottow. Previous experiments in Berlin had used uranium plates to poorer results. Originally, the physicists had intended to test a design made of suspended uranium cylinders, more similar to modern fuel rods. However, by now they were running out of time and decided to copy Diebner's design. Ideally, the cubes should have had an edge length of between six and seven centimeters, but the scientists had to use the smaller cubes from Diebner's last experiments and therefore cut the uranium plates to match them.

The radium-beryllium neutron source could be introduced into the center of the reactor through a so-called chimney (Kamin). During the following experiment, the heavy water, which was stored in three large tanks at the end of the tunnel, was also filled into the inner reactor vessel through the chimney. There were also channels in the lid through which neutron detectors were inserted. This made it possible to measure the spatial neutron distribution in the entire arrangement by utilizing the cylindrical symmetry. The construction work on the reactor was completed in the first week of March 1945.

=== Aims of the experiment ===
Schematic of a nuclear fission chain reaction, here with a multiplication factor of 2

The large-scale experiment B_{8}, aimed to start and observe a nuclear fission chain reaction by bombarding uranium with neutrons. The Haigerloch experiments were basic research. Their purpose was to determine as many of the associated nuclear physics parameters, such as cross sections, as the measurements allowed. Such data would be required for peaceful uses of nuclear fission as well as any military applications. At least some of those involved also hoped to achieve criticality and thus - supposedly for the first time - demonstrate a self-sustaining fission chain reaction. They were unaware that Enrico Fermi and his colleagues had already succeeded in December 1942 at the secret Chicago Pile-1 nuclear reactor in the United States.

However, the system had no facilities for regulating a critical state and switching it off again. There were no control rods, nor was there any way of quickly draining the heavy water once it had reached the boiler. In case the measured neutron flux density and thus the nuclear reaction rate rose too high, the plan was to abort the experiment before criticality was reached by quickly withdrawing the neutron source and stopping the heavy water supply. They relied on the Doppler coefficient to limit the power in the event of criticality, which describes the effect of a sinking neutron multiplication rate as the temperature rises. If, contrary to all expectations, the plant should get out of control, they had a piece of cadmium to throw into the reactor through the chimney which they hoped would interrupt the chain reaction by absorbing neutrons. However, the physicists would have been exposed to a high radiation dose at high neutron multiplication rates even if the apparatus remained subcritical since the plant did not have sufficient radiation shielding at the top.

The participants were aware of the possibility of the military use of their work, as Heisenberg had already informed the Heereswaffenamt at the end of 1939 that uranium-235 must be a powerful nuclear explosive. Von Weizsäcker had also pointed out early on that it would be suitable to build nuclear weapons, and hinted there might be another fissile element - later known as plutonium - that would have to be artificially created in uranium reactors. In principle, the Haigerloch tests could have confirmed these assumptions, but the scientists were also aware that many years of extensive research would have been necessary to develop operational weapons at the low levels of funding they had been granted.

=== The large-scale test B_{8} ===
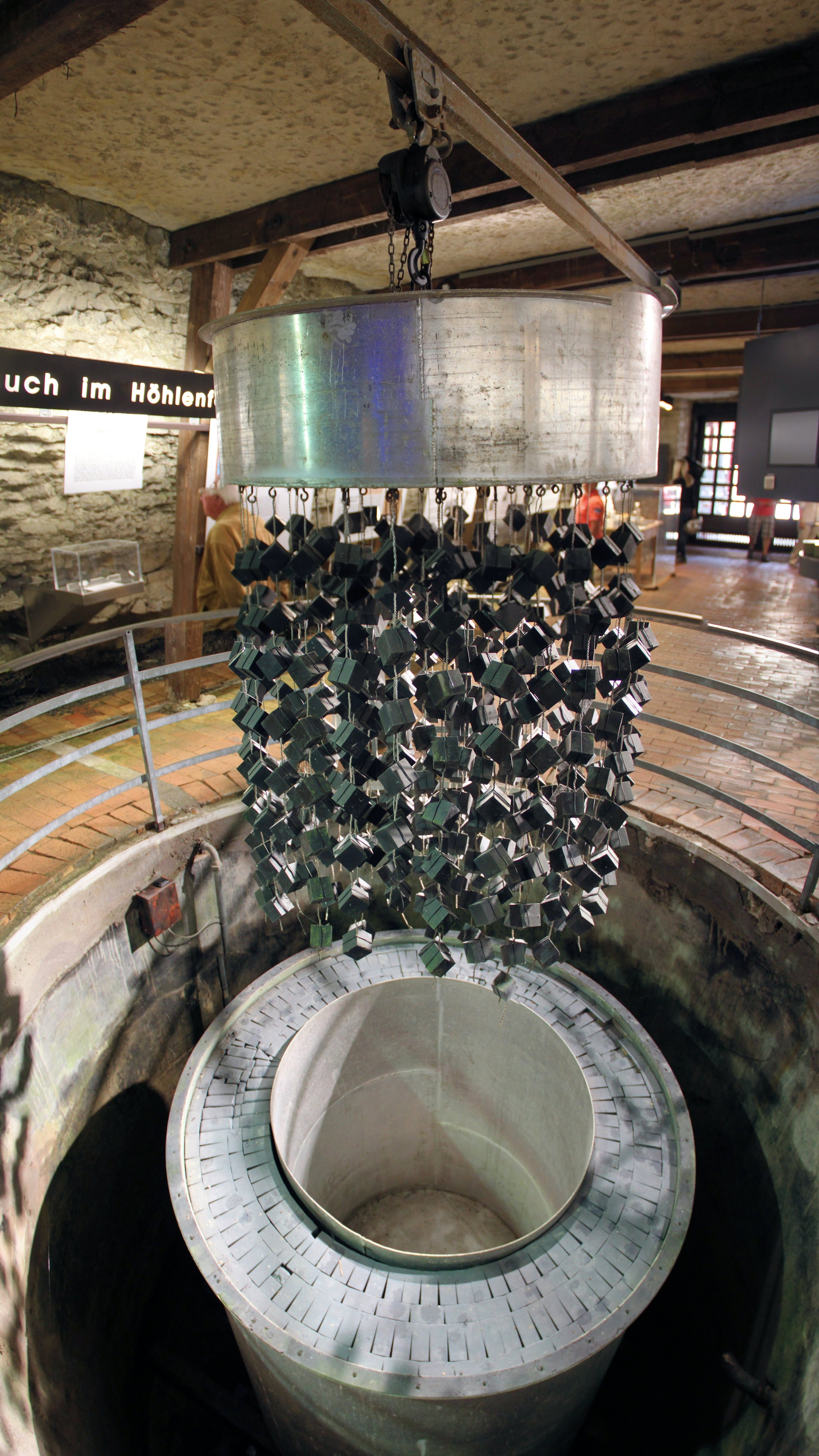
Reactor interior and uranium cube (replica)

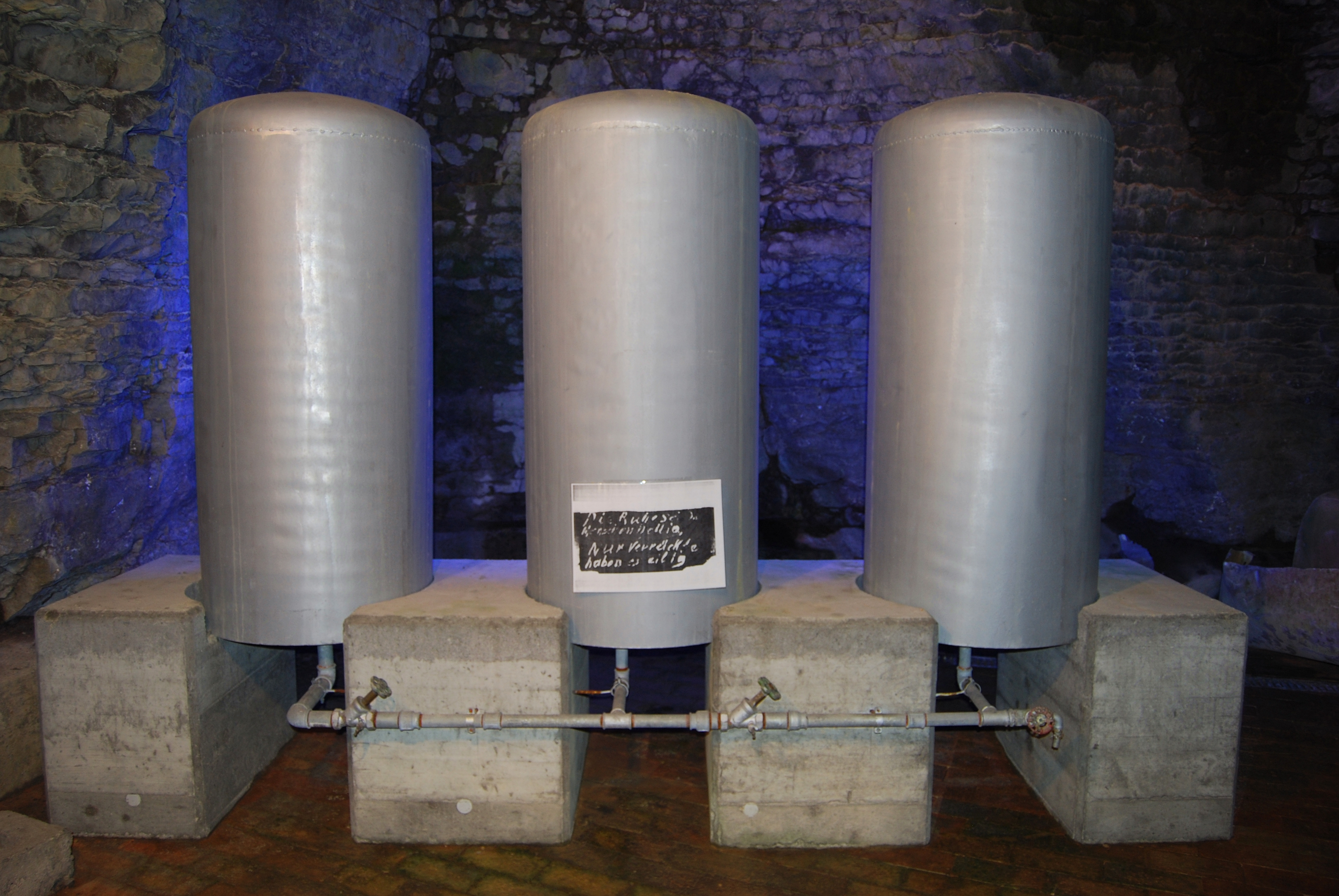
The heavy water tanks (replica)

Heisenberg himself was present in the cellar for the decisive experiment at the beginning of March 1945, "sitting there and constantly calculating". After the reactor had been closed and the neutron source had been introduced, the inner reactor vessel was slowly filled with heavy water. The water supply was interrupted at regular intervals to monitor the increase in neutrons. By plotting the reciprocal of the measured neutron intensity against the amount of heavy water filled in - an idea of Heisenberg's - the scientists hoped to predict the water level at which the reactor should become critical.

However, no criticality occurred even after all the available heavy water had been filled in. The neutron density in the filled arrangement had increased by a factor of 6.7. Although this was twice as much as in the previous experiment, it was still not enough to start a self-sustaining nuclear chain reaction. The neutron multiplication factor was k=0.85; the criticality would have been k=1. Later calculations showed that the plant would have needed to be about one and a half times bigger to become critical.

As it was, expanding the facility any further was impossible in the final days of the war in Europe. The heavy water factory of Norsk Hydro in Rjukan had long been destroyed by British bombers in November 1943, and in September 1944, the Degussa works in Frankfurt am Main had also been badly hit by a bomber detachment.

In a final bid for criticality, Heisenberg suggested to haul any heavy water and uranium left in Stadtilm to Haigerloch. He also wanted to throw all theory to the wind and introduce uranium oxide into the graphite shield. During the last measurements, Wirtz had discovered that graphite was a better moderator than previously assumed. However, they were no longer able to establish contact with Stadtilm as communications networks collapsed in the final defeat of Germany.

More accurate details about the plant and the course of the experiment can no longer be determined today as the original report is no longer available among the group's documents subsequently brought to the USA. However, some time around 1950, Heisenberg and Wirtz wrote up a thorough overall description of all eight large-scale experiments. A later analysis of two uranium cube fragments from Haigerloch by the Institute for Transuranium Elements at the Karlsruhe Research Center revealed that the uranium had only been irradiated with relatively few neutrons; plutonium could not be detected. This indicates that the researchers were not on the verge of a nuclear chain reaction and still a very long way from being able to produce a nuclear weapon.

== Persecution and destruction ==
=== The Alsos mission ===
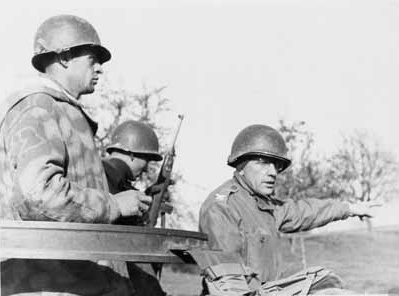
Boris Pash (right) during the Alsos III mission in Hechingen

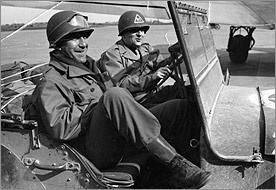
Samuel Goudsmit (right) during the Alsos III mission in Stadtilm

The Allies had long suspected that the German researchers were working on an atomic bomb. The aim of the US special unit Alsos, founded in 1943 as part of the Manhattan Project under General Leslie R. Groves, was to expose and secure the German nuclear research facilities and to capture the leading scientists. The aim was not only to advance Germany's own nuclear weapons program, but also to prevent the Soviet Union and the other later occupying forces from using the knowledge. The military head of the mission was Lieutenant Colonel Boris Pash, the scientific team was led by the Dutch-born physicist Samuel Goudsmit.

The Americans did not know exactly how far German research had progressed until the end of 1944. The Alsos I mission in the winter of 1943/44 in Italy had been largely unsuccessful.

It was not until the Alsos II mission in late November 1944, when letters from other members of the Uranium Association were found in Weizsäcker's office at the University of Strasbourg, that investigators concluded Germany did not possess an atomic bomb and would not be able to produce one in the foreseeable future. However, documents were also discovered that pointed to a suspicious research laboratory in the future French occupation zone in Hechingen. In order to get ahead of the French troops, Groves and Pash considered attacking the facility from the air with paratroopers or destroying it with bombing raids. However, the physicist Goudsmit was able to convince them that the uranium project was not worth the effort, and so they decided on a land operation.

The first special units of the Alsos III mission crossed the Rhine together with the 7th US Army on March 26, 1945. On March 30, 1945, they were able to pick up the physicists Walther Bothe and Wolfgang Gentner in Heidelberg, who were working there on their cyclotron. There, Goudsmit learned that the nuclear research facilities of the uranium project had been relocated to Haigerloch near Hechingen and to Stadtilm in the future Soviet occupation zone. Pash decided to go to Stadtilm first to get ahead of the Soviet army. They managed to arrive there about three weeks before the Soviet forces, but Diebner had already fled with his employees and materials towards Munich in the future American occupation zone. Now they only had to prevent the Haigerloch reactor from falling into French hands.

=== The destruction of the plant ===
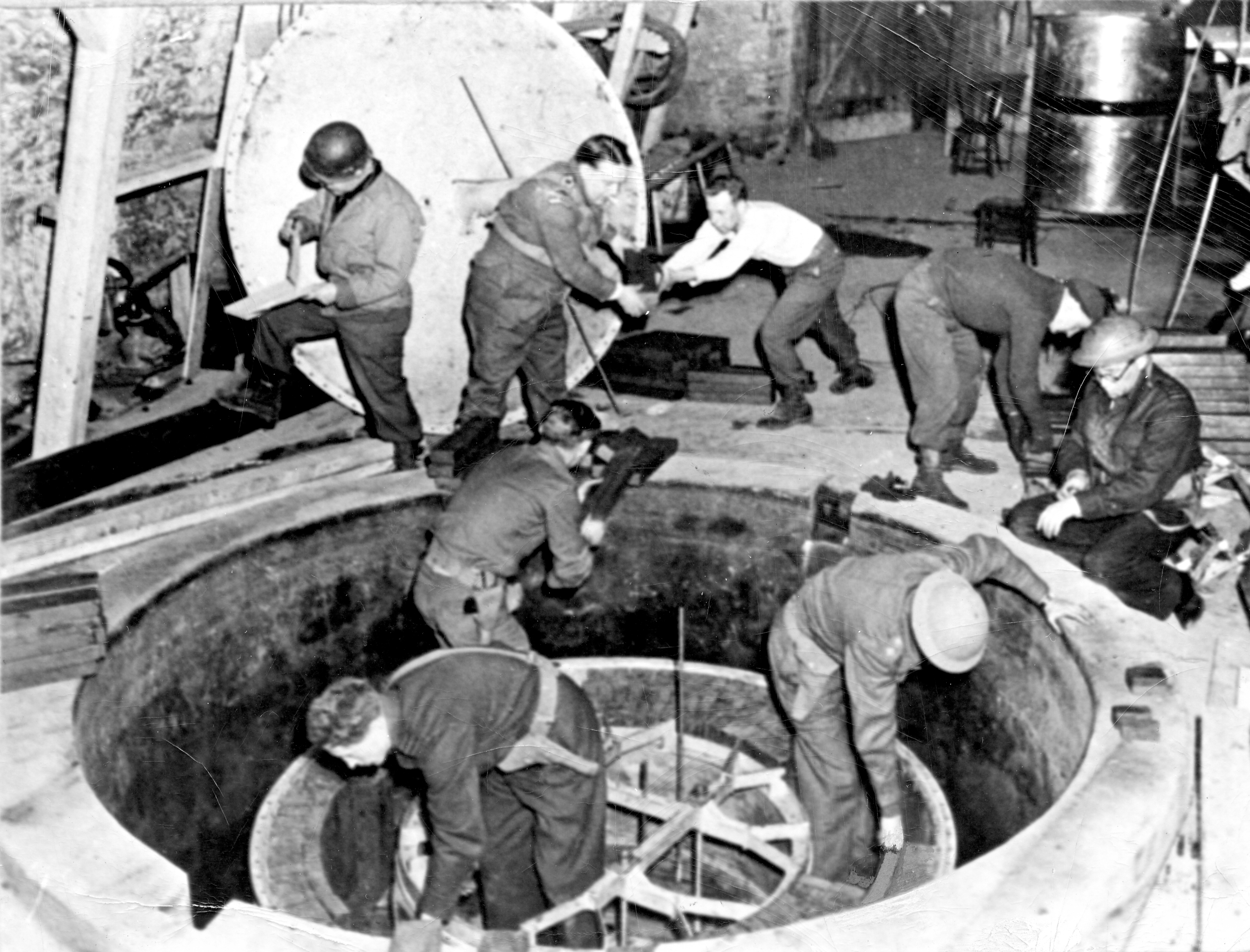
The dismantling of the reactor by members of the Alsos III mission

The French army arrived in Haigerloch on April 22, 1945, but they did not notice the underground nuclear laboratory. The Alsos mission arrived in the French occupation zone a day later as part of "Operation Harborage", found the apparatus and dismantled it the following day. Only now did the Americans realize that the German research was more than two years behind their own. It now also became apparent to them that the entire German uranium project was on a very small scale compared to the Manhattan Project:

Here was the central group of laboratories, and all it amounted to was a little underground cave, a wing of a small textile factory, a few rooms in an old brewery.

— Samuel Goudsmit, 24. April 1945,

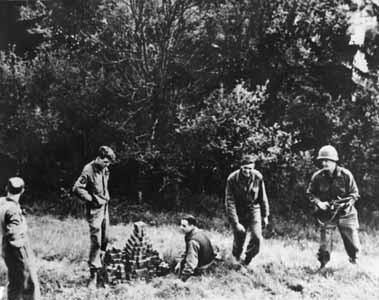
The discovery of the buried uranium cubes

The German scientists, on the other hand, believed that their work was more advanced than that of the Americans and were initially uncooperative. The uranium cubes and the heavy water had been removed from the facility and well hidden. However, after hours of interrogation, Wirtz and von Weizsäcker were coaxed into revealing the hiding places with the false promise that they would be allowed to resume their experiments after the war under the protection of the Allies. 659 of the 664 uranium cubes were found buried in a field next to the castle church; the heavy water had been taken to the cellar of an old mill. Von Weizsäcker had hidden the scientific documents, including the top-secret Nuclear physics research reports, in a cesspit behind his house in Hechingen.

The materials and scientific reports were seized by the Americans and flown to the United States via Paris. The parts of the reactor plant that could not be removed were destroyed by several small blasts. A larger blast in the rock cellar would probably have severely damaged the baroque castle church above. The parish priest at the time was able to prevent this by showing the church to the Americans and convincing Pash to only carry out smaller blasts.

A French task force led by the physicist Yves Rocard, which arrived in Hechingen shortly after the US troops in search of the facility, found only a piece of uranium from a laboratory the size of a sugar cube. Nevertheless, parts from the Haigerloch atomic pile, such as the high-purity graphite bricks, are said to have been reused in the first French nuclear reactor ZOÉ.

== Consequences ==
=== Further developments ===
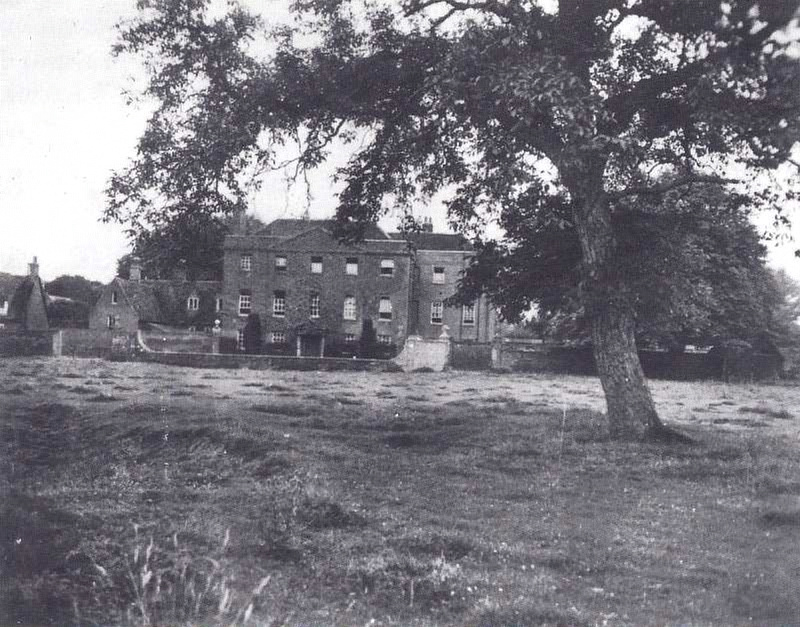
The Farm Hall country estate

The scientists from the two Kaiser Wilhelm Institutes were arrested by the Americans in their offices and homes in Hechingen and Tailfingen. Heisenberg himself was apprehended a few days later in Urfeld am Walchensee, where he owned a house and spent the last days of the war with his family; Gerlach and Diebner were found in and near Munich. The ten leading figures of the uranium project (Bagge, Diebner, Gerlach, Hahn, Heisenberg, Korsching, von Laue, von Weizsäcker and Wirtz, plus the physicist Paul Harteck) were interned in Operation Epsilon from July 1945 to January 1946 in British Farm Hall. There, on 6 August 1945, they learned of the atomic bombs dropped on Hiroshima and Nagasaki and thus also of the progress made by the Americans in nuclear technology and its consequences. The German scientists were deeply shocked, but at the same time relieved:

I would say I was absolutely convinced of the possibility that we would make a uranium machine, but I never thought we would make a bomb, and in my heart of hearts I was really glad that it was going to be a machine and not a bomb.

— Werner Heisenberg, 6. August 1945,

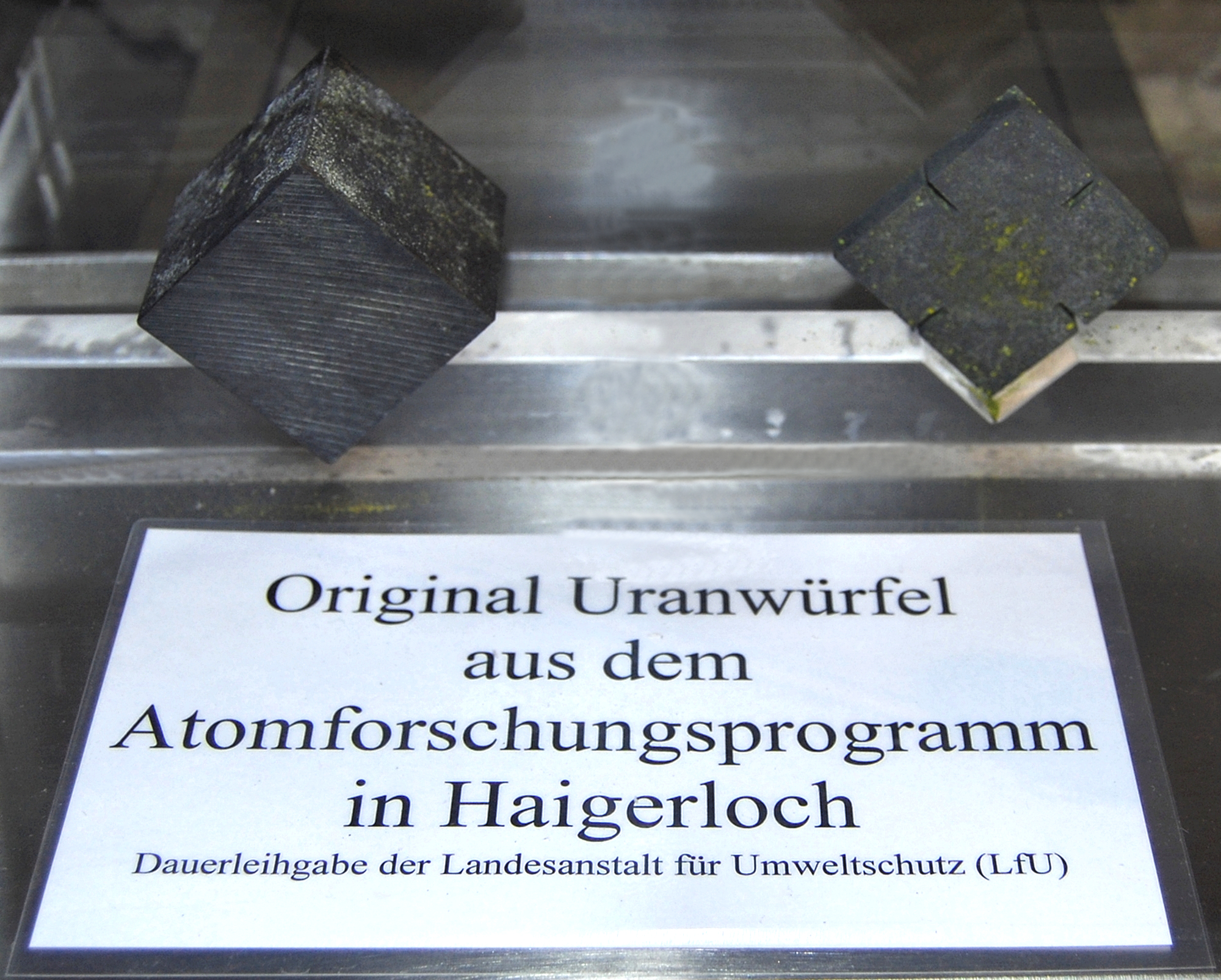
Two of the original uranium cubes

After their internment, the ten researchers returned home, where - with the exception of Diebner - they were able to take up respected positions in the scientific community. Although the Control Council Law No. 25 prohibited Germany from pursuing further development of a nuclear reactor in the post-war years, Heisenberg was already thinking about a German reactor again in 1950. It was not until 1957 that the first nuclear reactor on German soil, the Munich Research Reactor, went into operation. In the same year, most members of the Uranium Project, together with other leading German nuclear physicists, spoke out against the military use of nuclear energy in Germany in the Göttinger Manifesto.

Today, the Atomic Cellar Museum, which opened in 1980, is located in the rock cellar and houses a replica of the reactor as well as two of the five remaining uranium cubes. One of the two cubes was taken by Heisenberg and found by children playing in the Loisach river near his home in the early 1960s.

=== Further processing of events ===
The two-part German television film End of Innocence from 1991 documents the development of the uranium project from the discovery of nuclear fission in 1938 to the experiments in Haigerloch and the subsequent internment of the scientists in 1945. Some of the film scenes were shot at the original location in the Haigerloch rock cellar. Screenwriter Wolfgang Menge and director Frank Beyer were awarded the Deutscher Fernsehfilmpreis for writing and directing in 1991.

The play Copenhagen by Michael Frayn from 1998 is about a fictional meeting between Heisenberg and Niels Bohr and his wife Margarete at an unspecified point in time after the end of the war. At the end of the first act, Heisenberg reflects on the work on the Haigerloch atomic pile, the lack of safety measures and the endeavor to achieve criticality for the first time. The three-character play received the Tony Award for Best Play in 2000. A real meeting between the two men had taken place during the war in Copenhagen in 1941, but it is not clear from the documents that still exist today what was said at the time and specifically how it was meant and interpreted. According to Heisenberg's later recollection, he tried to speak "in code" because he feared that Bohr was being monitored and spied on by German occupation troops. Bohr seems to have misunderstood him, or Heisenberg's claims were a retrospective protective assertion.

The 1999 novel The Klingsor Paradox by Mexican author Jorge Volpi is about the search by two scientists for Hitler's alleged closest scientific advisor, code-named Klingsor. In a flashback, we follow one of the two protagonists as he uncovers the German nuclear program in Heidelberg, Hechingen and Haigerloch as a fictitious part of the Alsos mission together with Goudsmit and Pash. In the end, Klingsor - the personification of evil - proves to be intangible. The bestseller received several awards, including the Spanish literary prize Premio Biblioteca Breve in 1999.

== Literature ==
- Jeremy Bernstein, David Cassidy (2001), Hitler's uranium club: the secret recordings at Farm Hall (2. ed.), New York NY: Copernicus Books, ISBN 0-387-95089-3
- Per Fridtjof Dahl (1999), Heavy Water and the Wartime Race for Nuclear Energy, Philadelphia PA u. a.: Institute of Physics, ISBN 0-7503-0633-5
- Egidius Fechter (2013), Humbug in der Höhlenforschungsstelle. Zum Atomkeller-Museum Haigerloch, Haigerloch: EF Verlag, ISBN 978-3-00-038583-4
- Werner Heisenberg: Der Teil und das Ganze. Gespräche im Umkreis der Atomphysik. 7. Edition. Piper, Munich and others 2008, ISBN 978-3-492-22297-6 (Serie Piper 2297).
- Dieter Hoffmann, ed. (1993), Operation Epsilon. Die Farm-Hall-Protokolle oder Die Angst der Alliierten vor der deutschen Atombombe, Berlin: Rowohlt, ISBN 3-87134-082-0
- Robert Jungk: Heller als tausend Sonnen. Das Schicksal der Atomforscher. Scherz & Goverts, Stuttgart 1958
- Rainer Karlsch (2005), Hitlers Bombe, München: Deutsche Verlags-Anstalt, ISBN 3-421-05809-1
- Thomas Powers (1993), Heisenbergs Krieg. Die Geheimgeschichte der deutschen Atombombe, Hoffmann und Campe, ISBN 3-455-08479-6
- Paul Lawrence Rose (2001), Heisenberg und das Atombombenprojekt der Nazis, Zürich u. a.: Pendo, ISBN 3-85842-422-6
- Michael Schaaf (2018), Heisenberg, Hitler und die Bombe (Um weitere Interviews und Dokumente erweiterte Neuausgabe), Berlin: GNT-Verlag, ISBN 978-3-86225-115-5
- Mark Walker (1992), Die Uranmaschine. Mythos und Wirklichkeit der deutschen Atombombe, Berlin: Siedler, ISBN 3-442-12835-8
- Karl Wirtz (1987), Im Umkreis der Physik, Karlsruhe: Kernforschungszentrum Karlsruhe, ISBN 3-923704-02-X
