= Filippo Bottazzi =

Italian physiologist

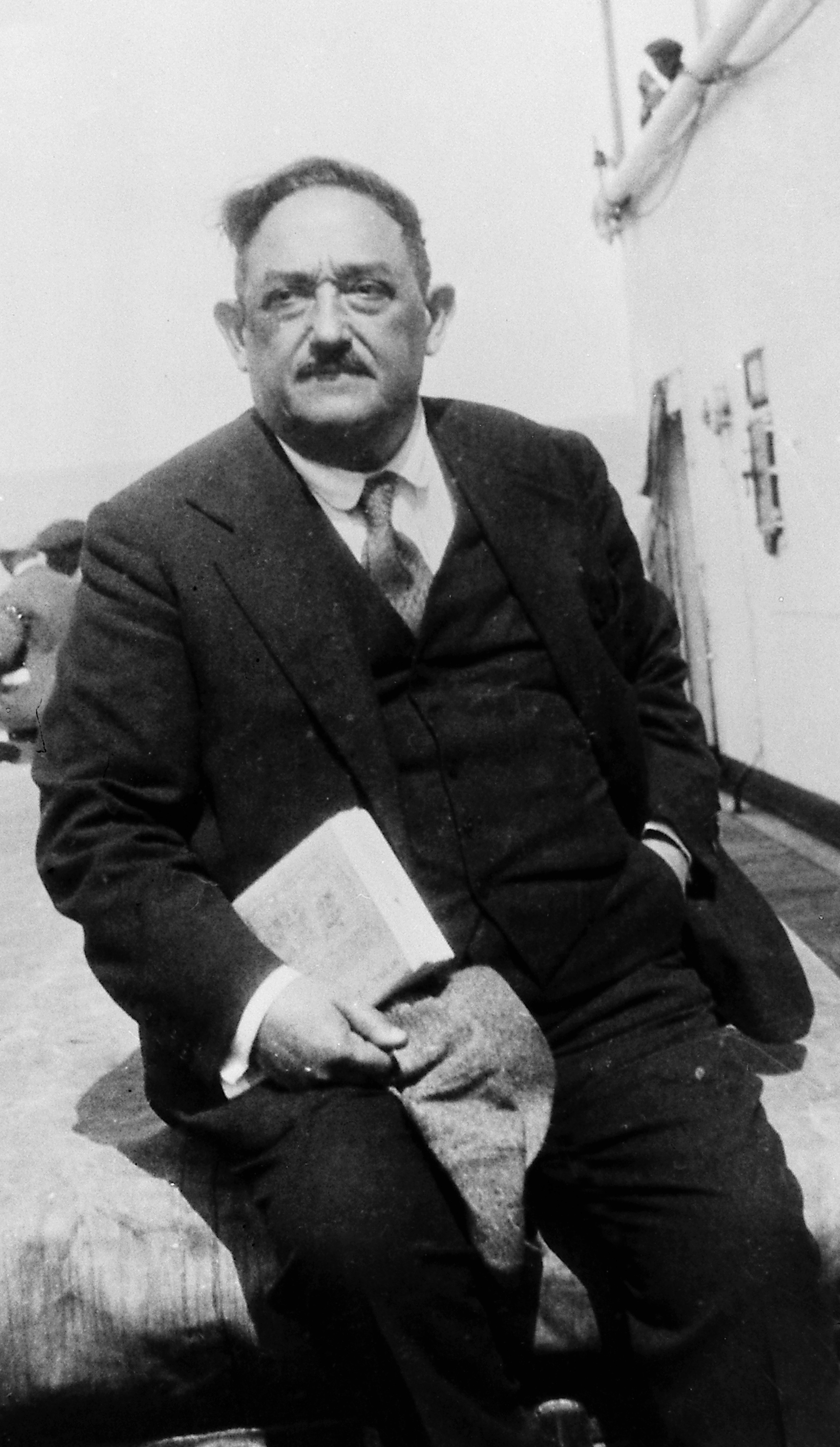
Portrait

Filippo Bottazzi (23 December 1867 – 19 September 1941) was an Italian biochemist who is considered the father of Italian Biochemistry. Bottazzi conducted experiments on the physiology and biochemical aspects of blood in his early career. His political association with the fascist regime in Italy and his participation in antisemitism led to his scientific contributions being overlooked.

Bottazzi was born in Diso, Apulia where his father Giuseppe Maria Antonio was an artist. His mother was Maria Donata Cecilia Bortone. He studied medicine in Rome, graduating in 1893 and joining the Institute of Higher, Practical, and Postgraduate Studies of Florence the next year.

Bottazzi studied under Giulio Fano who was influenced by the physiology schools of Luigi Luciani and Angelo Mosso. In 1894 Bottazzi studied the reduction in osmotic resistance experienced by red blood cells during the splenic cycle. He continued his research in the area of the milieu interieur begun in France by Claude Bernard that compared the life of aquatic and land animals. Bottazzi collaborated with scientists in other countries, he was invited to work with Michael Foster at Cambridge in 1894 and he translated Foster's Treatise on Physiology in 1899. In 1923 the University of Edinburgh conferred an honorary LL.D. degree to Botttazzi during the eleventh International Physiological Congress. Bottazzi rose to head the Institute of Physiology at the University of Genoa and later at Naples. In early 1940 he was a candidate for the Nobel Prize in medicine but the prizes themselves were suspended until 1943 due to the war. Bottazzi also took an interest in the history of science and in the philosophy of science and its methods. Bottazzi published Il metodo sperimentale nelle discipline biologiche in 1906 where he examined experimental methods in biology. He celebrated the role of Italian scientists Leonardo, Galileo, Spallanzani, and Bufalini and pointed to biology being best explained by mechanistic or physico-chemical phenomena. He however considered human thought to be different.

Botazzi was however not recognized by scientists due to the part he played in fascist politics. He was one of the signatories to the Manifesto degli scienziati razzisti (Manifesto of Race). Bottazzi became a member of the Commissione dell’alimentazione created to solve problems of malnutrition arising from the sanctions imposed on Italy from 1926. In 1933 he published a report along with A. Niceforo and G. Quagliarello on the dietary status of Italians. In 1938, a letter was sent by the Ministry of Education to the Accademia d’Italia and it put several scientists in charge of purging all scientific works made by Jewish scientists. The list of scientists included on this purging committee included the chemist Francesco Giordani, admiral Giancarlo Vallauri, mathematician Francesco Severi and Bottazzi.

== Selected works ==
- La mente e l'opera di Leonardo da Vinci, Città del Vaticano: Pontificia Academia Scientiarum, 1941.
- Trattato di Chimica Fisiologica (Milan 1898-9) 2 voll, translation into German by H. Boruttau (1901).
- Principi di Fisiologia (Milan 1905-6),
- Lezioni di Fisiologia Sperimentale (Naples 1906),
- Fisiologia dell'Alimentazione (1910, 1919),
- La Grotta Zinzulusa in Terra d'Otranto ed il ritrovamento in essa di Typhlocaris (Catania 1923) with Pasquale De Laurentiis and Gino Stasi.

== Bibliography ==
- Giuseppe Antonio Giannuzzo, Francesco Corvaglia, Filippo Bottazzi: vita, opere, giudizi (Tricase 1992)
- Carlo Stasi, Dizionario Enciclopedico dei Salentini (Grifo, Lecce, 2018) vol. I, pp.108-109
