= Korzhev =

Korzhev (from korzh meaning flatbread) is a Slavic masculine surname, its feminine counterpart is Korzheva. Notable people with the surname include:

- Dmitry Korzhev (born 1978), Russian association football player
- Geliy Korzhev (1925–2012), Russian painter

== See also ==
- Korzh
