= Korsh, Republic of Dagestan =

Korsh Корш
- Selo
- Location within Republic of Dagestan Location within Russia
- Coordinates: 41°40′N 47°03′E
- Country: Russia
- Region: Republic of Dagestan
- District: Rutulsky District
- Time zone: UTC+3:00

Korsh (Russian: Корш, romanized: Korsh) is a rural locality (a selo) in Kalyalskoye Rural Settlement, Rutulsky District, Republic of Dagestan, Russia. Population: 63 (2010 census); 83 (2002 census); 73 (1989 Soviet census). There are two streets.

== Geography ==
Korsh is located 44 km northwest of Rutul (the district's administrative centre) by road. Mishlesh and Ottal are the nearest rural localities.

== Nationalities ==
Tsakhur people live there.
