= Gregg Herken =

American historian and museum curator

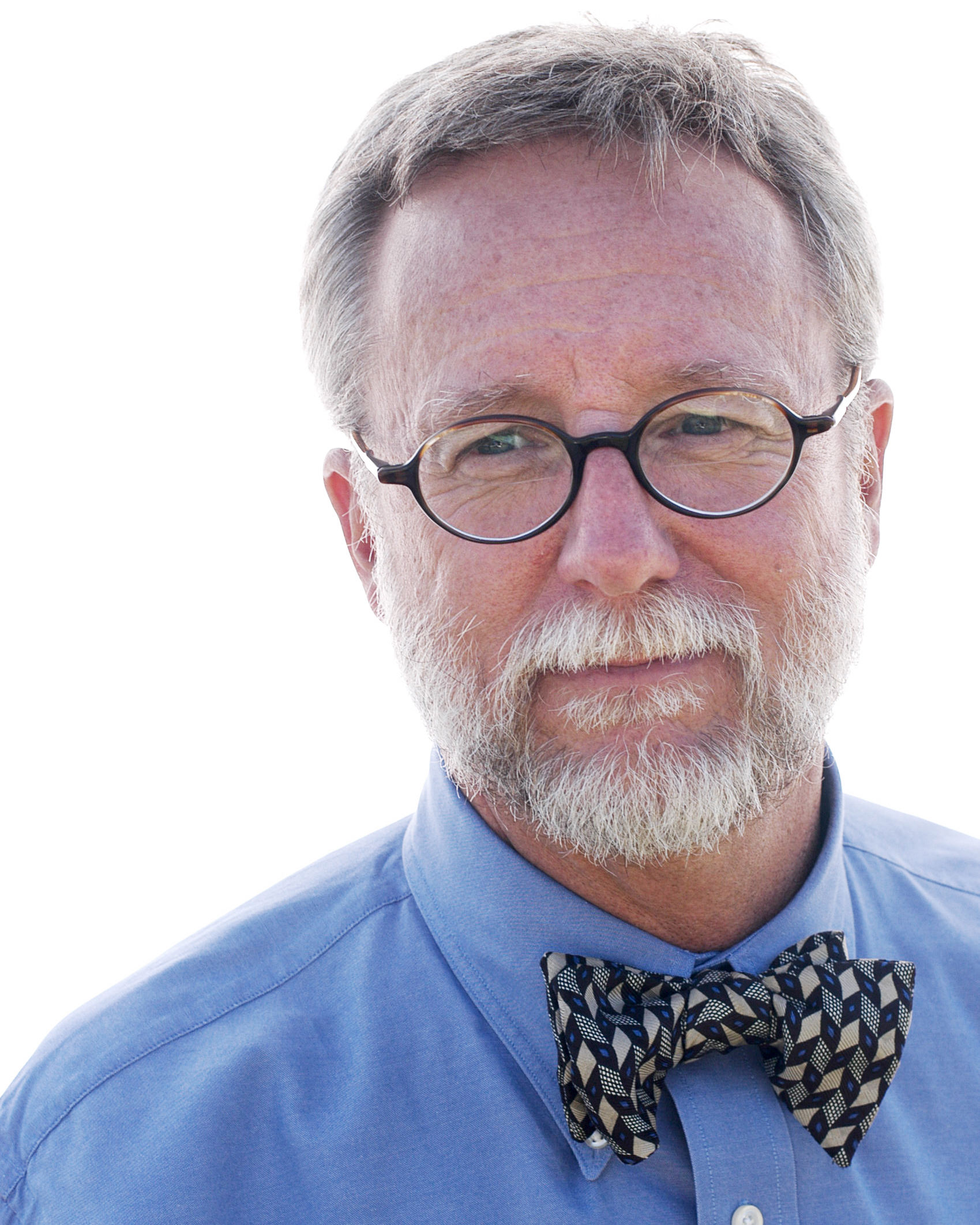
- Herken in 2004
- Education: University of California, Santa Cruz (BA); Princeton University (PhD)
- Occupations: Historian; museum curator

Gregg Herken is an American historian and museum curator who is professor emeritus of modern American diplomatic History at the University of California, Santa Cruz & Merced, whose scholarship mostly concerns the history of the development of atomic energy and the Cold War.

== Biography ==
In 1969, Herken received a B.A. from University of California, Santa Cruz. In 1974, he received a Ph.D. in modern American diplomatic history from Princeton University.

Herken held teaching positions at California State University, San Luis Obispo, Oberlin College, Yale University, and California Institute of Technology, and was a Fulbright-Hays senior research scholar at Lund University. During 1988–2003 he was a senior historian and curator of military space, as well as chairman of the Department of Space History at the Smithsonian Institution's National Air and Space Museum in Washington, D.C. In 1994–95, he served on the U.S. government's Advisory Committee on Human Radiation Experiments. Since 2005, Herken has been a Senior Fellow at the Middlebury Institute of International Studies in Monterey, California.

== Works ==
In 2003, Herken's book Brotherhood of the Bomb, for which he received a MacArthur Grant to write, was a finalist for the Los Angeles Times Book Prize in history.

- —— (12 February 1981). The Winning Weapon: The Atomic Bomb in the Cold War 1945-1950 (1st ed.). Knopf. ISBN 978-0394503943. LCCN 80007643. OCLC 1154559530. OL 4094849M – via Internet Archive.
- —— (12 March 1985). Counsels of War (1st ed.). Knopf. ISBN 978-0394527352. LCCN 84047876. OCLC 470805690. OL 2868891M – via Internet Archive.
- —— (9 April 1992). Cardinal Choices: Presidential Science Advising from the Atomic Bomb to SDI (1st ed.). Oxford University Press. ISBN 978-0195072105. LCCN 91030281. OCLC 243726684. OL 1550563M – via Internet Archive.
- —— (9 September 2002). Brotherhood of the Bomb: The Tangled Lives and Loyalties of Robert Oppenheimer, Ernest Lawrence and Edward Teller (1st ed.). Henry Holt and Company. ISBN 978-0-80-506588-6. LCCN 2002017219. OCLC 890256840. OL 7932650M – via Internet Archive.
- —— (28 October 2014). The Georgetown Set: Friends and Rivals in Cold War Washington (1st ed.). Knopf. ISBN 978-0307271181. LCCN 2013047033. OCLC 917334657. OL 27170115M – via Internet Archive.
