= John R. Johnson =

American chemist (1900–1983)

John Raven Johnson (August 9, 1900 – May 25, 1983) was an American chemist.

== Career ==
=== Discovery ===
Johnson was notable, among other things, for the discovery of the nearly quantitative oxidation of organoboranes to alcohols by alkaline hydrogen peroxide.

=== Educational achievements ===
- Johnson was Todd Professor Emeritus of Chemistry at Cornell University, a member of the National Academy of Sciences, chair of the Cornell Department of Chemistry.
- 1928 Laboratory Experiments in Organic Chemistry – "a widely used textbook"
- Johnson received his Ph.D. in organic chemistry from the University of Illinois in 1922.
