= Eric Welsh =

British chemist and naval intelligence officer

Eric Welsh CMG OBE RNVR (31 August 1897 – 21 November 1954) was a British chemist and naval intelligence officer during the Second World War. Between 1919 and 1940 he worked for the Bergen branch of the company International Paint Ltd. From 1941 he headed the Norwegian branch of Secret Intelligence Service (SIS). Welsh is fleetingly referred to in the Norwegian television series The Heavy Water War and, based on the comments by Stephen Dorril of Welsh as a "...ladies' man who drank and smoked to excess" and a "master of dirty tricks", alluded to as one of the models to James Bond.

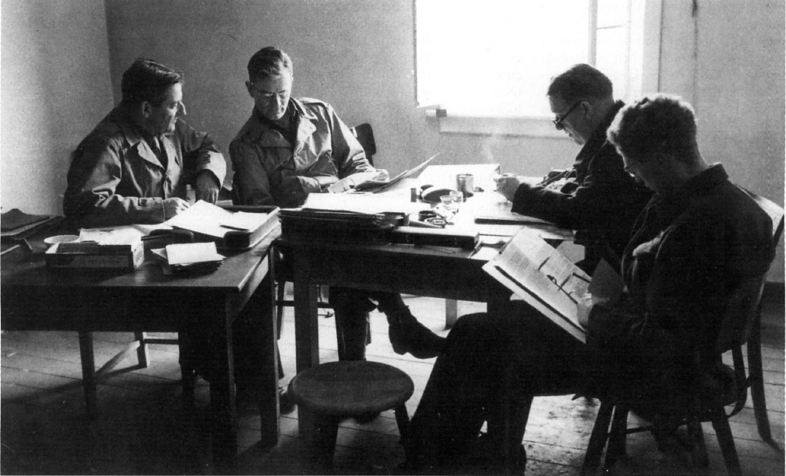
Eric Welsh in a meeting with Samuel Goudsmit, Fred Wardenburg and Rupert Cecil

SIS operated more than one hundred intelligence operations in Norway during World War II, with about 200 agents shipped from Britain to Norway. Their principal operational goals were to gather information on German warships and ships traffic along the Norwegian coast. The normal communication channel was coded radio transmissions. 26 of the radio agents in Norway lost their lives during the war, either in combat, or after being captured by the Germans.

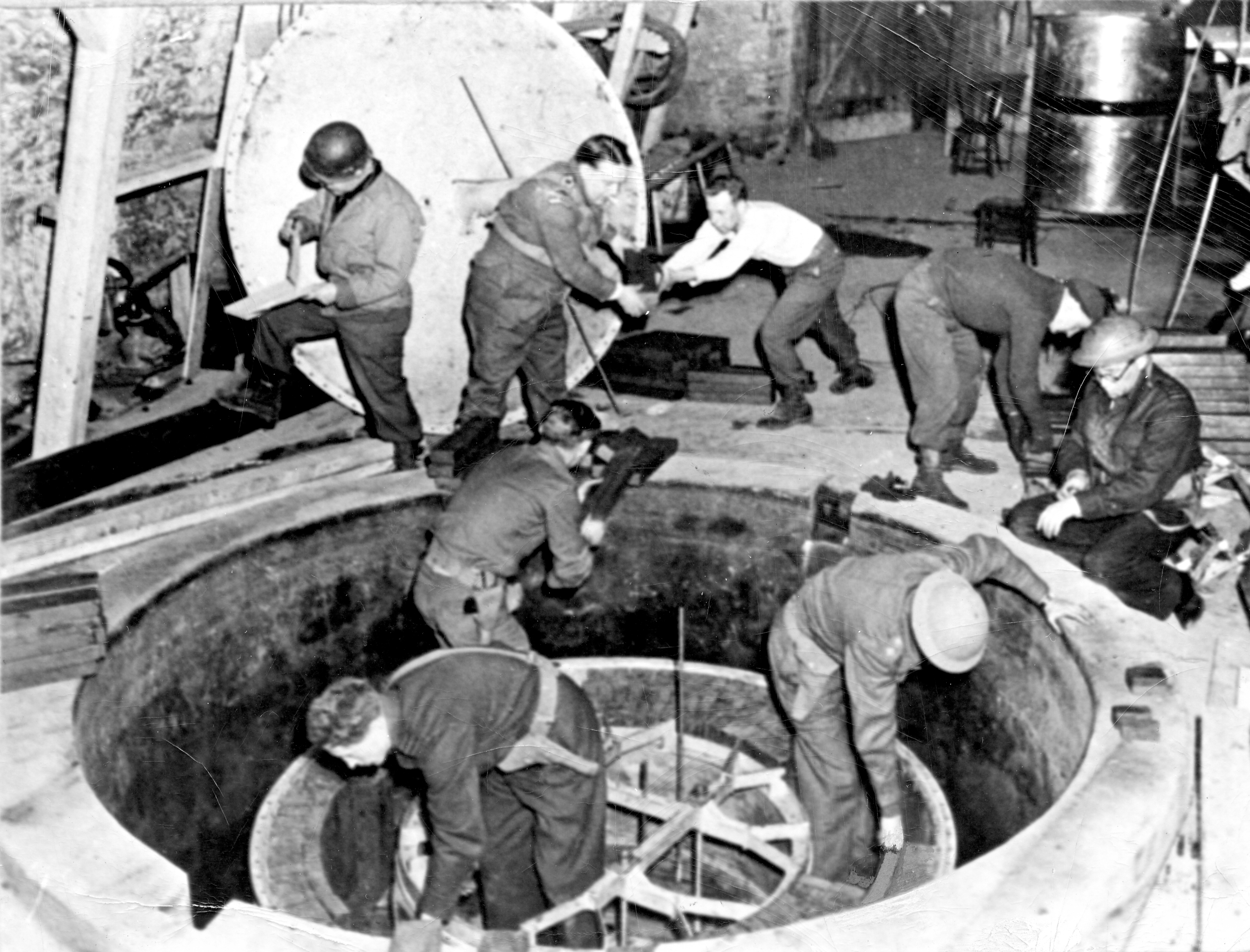
The German experimental nuclear pile at Haigerloch with Welsh in battledress at top centre, Rupert Cecil nearest camera

Lieutenant-Commander Eric Welsh was appointed an Officer of the Order of the British Empire in 1944 and a Companion of the Order of St Michael and St George in 1952.

== See also ==
- German nuclear weapon project
- Operation Alsos
