= Korzh =

Korzh means flatbread in several Slavic languages. It is also a gender-neutral Slavic surname that may refer to

- Vasily Korzh (1899–1967), Belarusian resistance leader during World War II
- Vitaliy Korzh (born 1987), Ukrainian sprinter
- Dmitriy Korzh (born 1971), Turkmen football player and coach

== See also ==
- Korzhev
