= Kirschner =

Kirschner is a German occupational surname literally meaning "furrier". It may refer to:

- Aloisia Kirschner (1854–1934), Austrian novelist
- Ann Kirschner, American academic and author
- Princess Superstar (Concetta Suzanne Kirschner, born 1971), American rapper and DJ
- David Kirschner (born 1955), American film and television producer
- Denise Kirschner, American mathematical biologist and immunologist
- Diana Kirschner (born 1948), American psychologist
- Glenn Kirschner (born 1961), American prosecutor and TV legal analyst, podcaster
- Jana Kirschner (born 1978), Slovak singer
- Joachim Kirschner (1920–1943), German fighter pilot
- Marc Kirschner (born 1945), American biologist
- Martin Kirschner (1879–1942), German surgeon
  - Kirschner wire named after him
- Belle Delphine (Mary-Belle Kirschner, born 1999), British Internet celebrity, model and YouTuber
