= Francesco Giordani =

Italian research chemist and scientist

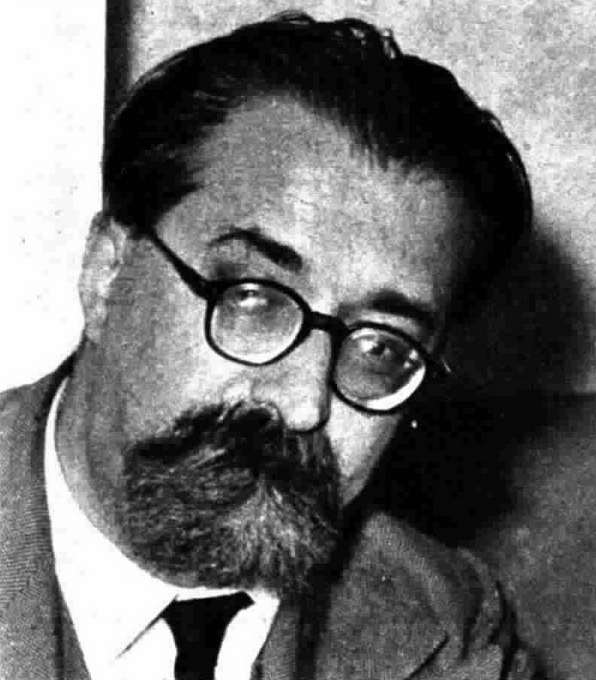
- Francesco Giordani in Radiocorriere magazine, 1954.
- Born: 5 July 1896; Naples, Italy
- Died: 24 January 1961 (aged 64); Naples, Italy

Francesco Giordani (5 July 1896 – 24 January 1961) was an Italian research chemist and scientist.

== Biography ==
Born in Naples, the son of a municipal engineer, in 1914 Giordani showed his early interest in the sciences by releasing a study of aerodynamics in a local scientific journal. In 1918, he graduated in chemistry at the University of Naples and began to devote himself to electrochemistry, particularly focusing on chlor-alkali electrolysis. He is best known as the inventor of the theory of electrolytic diaphragm and the circulation of alkaline chloride, which eventually led to the invention of the Giordani-Pomilio electrolyzer.

After teaching electrochemistry at the Engineering School of Naples, in 1935 Giordani became professor of general and inorganic chemistry in his alma mater, also directing the Chemical Institute of the university. He also founded and directed several scientific institutions, as well as the journal Questioni meridionali.
