= Ferrouranium =

Alloy of iron and uranium

Ferrouranium, also called ferro-uranium, is a ferroalloy, an alloy of iron and uranium, after World War II usually depleted uranium.

== Composition and properties ==
The alloy contains about 35–50% uranium and 1.5–4.0% carbon. At least two intermetallic compounds of iron and uranium were identified: U_{6}Fe and UFe_{2}. Small amounts of uranium can drastically lower the melting point of iron and vice versa. UFe_{2} reportedly melts at 1230 °C, U_{6}Fe at 805 °C; a mixture of these two can have melting point as low as 725 °C, a mixture of iron and UFe_{2} can have melting point of 1055 °C. As ferrouranium readily dissolves in mineral acids, its chemical analysis is not problematic.

== Use ==
The first uses of ferrouranium date back to 1897, when the French government attempted to use it for guns. Ferrouranium is used as a deoxidizer (more powerful than ferrovanadium), for denitrogenizing steel, for forming carbides, and as an alloying element. In ferrous alloys, uranium increases the elastic limit and the tensile strength. In high speed steels, it has been used to increase toughness and strength in amounts between 0.05 and 5%. Uranium-alloyed steels can be used at very low temperatures; nickel-uranium alloys are resistant to even very aggressive chemicals, including aqua regia.

== Economics ==
The alloys did not prove to be commercially successful in the long run. However, during World War I and afterwards, uranium-doped steels were used for tools; large amounts of ferrouranium were produced between 1914 and 1916.
