= Michael Perrin =

Canadian-born British scientist (1905–1988)

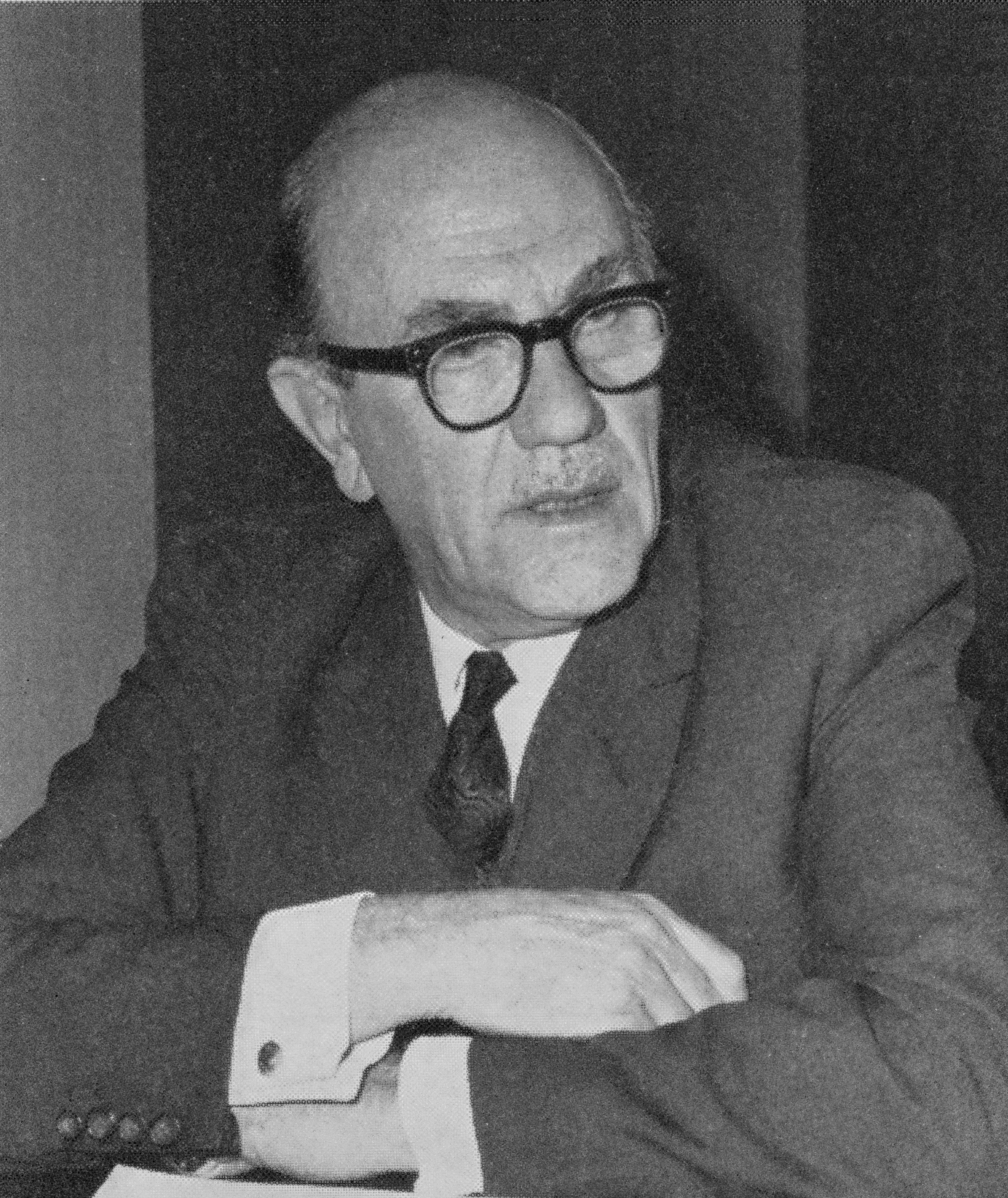
Michael Perrin in 1971

Sir Michael Willcox Perrin, CBE, FRSC (13 September 1905 – 18 August 1988) was a Canadian-born British scientist who created the first practical polythene, directed the first British atomic bomb programme, and participated in the Allied intelligence of the Nazi atomic bomb.

== Chemistry career ==
Born 13 September 1905 in Victoria, British Columbia, he moved to England in 1911 with his British parents, who sent him to Twyford School and Winchester College, and from there to study chemistry at New College, Oxford and the University of Toronto.

Joining Imperial Chemical Industries, Perrin led a small team that investigated high-pressure polymerization and patented the first practical industrial method for producing polythene in 1935.

== Atomic programme ==
Perrin was promoted to assist ICI's research director, Wallace Akers. With the advent of World War II, between 1940 and 1941 they participated in the Government's MAUD Committee which concluded it was feasible to build an atomic bomb. Both then moved into the secret team that would design a British atomic bomb, and they ran the key committees of Tube Alloys, as it was called. After a fact-finding visit to the United States in 1942, Perrin realised that its government had, at last, recognised the significance of the atomic bomb, and saw the potential of that country now that it had properly mobilised. On arriving home he worked to persuade the government of the importance of combining with America. This was accepted; about sixty Tube Alloys scientists were sent to America in the British Mission and subsumed into the Manhattan Project. Perrin remained as co-ordinator for the British Government.

He was also charged with understanding the status of the German atomic bomb programme through the military intelligence services and their spy network, including interviewing the physicist Niels Bohr after he fled occupied Denmark. Having identified and understood the significance of the Nazi heavy water plant in Norway, he ensured that efforts were made to disrupt it. He accompanied the Allied invasion force as it entered occupied Europe to confirm the actual level of understanding of German atomic research. He identified Werner Heisenberg and his team of nuclear scientists for investigation and made sure they were brought to Britain where he could interview them and have them secretly recorded.

He was also tasked with documenting the story of Britain's role in developing the atomic bomb to counterbalance the published American account, which was thought at the time to have not properly acknowledged the British work.

After the war, Lord Portal was appointed to the new government post of Controller of Production (Atomic Energy) at the Ministry of Supply with Perrin as his hands-on deputy. They ran three groups:

- atomic research under John Cockcroft;
- atomic weapon development under William Penney
- atomic reactors and energy under Christopher Hinton.

However, Perrin reported one of his most difficult experiences as being the person to whom Klaus Fuchs confessed his spying while in Cockcroft's group, in 1950. It was Perrin who was asked to manage the damage caused by that discovery.

Perrin was also becoming frustrated that the civilian energy organisation was held back as a government department, and he left the Ministry for a post in private enterprise in 1951. (It was not run as a commercial enterprise until the run up to privatisation of the AEA Technology group, after his death in 1996.)

== Wellcome Trust ==
He moved back to ICI and then became chairman of the Wellcome Foundation, where he stayed until retirement in 1970. In this position he worked hard to secure the finances of the organisation, and directed it in the expansion of university research and training across medicine, pharmacology and allied disciplines.

He received the OBE and CBE for his atomic work. In 1967 he was knighted for his Wellcome work, as well as his other work and directorships of professional institutions, hospitals, museums, and the Roedean School.

He died on 18 August 1988 at the age of 82.

== Sources ==
- Obituary The Times 22 August 1988
- Brian Cathcart Sept 2004 accessed 20 Oct 2007 in Oxford Dictionary of National Biography
