= Boris Pash =

United States Army officer (1900–1995)

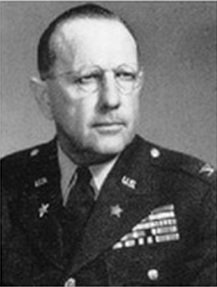
- Pash in 1945
- Born: Boris Fedorovich Pashkovsky; 20 June 1900; San Francisco, California, US
- Died: 11 May 1995 (aged 94) Greenbrae, California, US
- Buried: Serbian Cemetery, Colma, California, US
- Allegiance: Russian Empire; White Movement; United States of America
- Service: Imperial Russian Army; Russian Black Sea Fleet; United States Army
- Service years: 1916–1917, 1918–1920, 1938–1957
- Rank: Colonel
- Commands: Alsos Mission
- Conflicts: World War I; Russian Civil War; World War II; Allied Invasion of Italy; Allied Invasion of France; Allied Invasion of Germany
- Awards: Cross of St. George (Russia); Legion of Merit; Distinguished Service Medal
- Education: Springfield College (BS); University of Southern California (MS)

Boris Theodore Pash (20 June 1900 – 11 May 1995; born Boris Fyodorovich Pashkovsky) (Note: Russian: Борис Фёдорович Пашковский) was a United States Army military intelligence officer. He commanded the Alsos Mission during World War II and retired with the rank of colonel.

== Early life ==
Boris Fedorovich Pashkovsky was born in San Francisco, California, on 20 June 1900. His father was Theodore Pashkovsky (who would become Metropolitan Theophilus from 1934 to 1950), a Russian Orthodox priest and later archbishop who had been sent to California by the Church in 1894. His mother was Serbian American Ella Dabovich, niece of Sebastian Dabovich, a monk who also lived in America and was canonized in September 2015 as an Orthodox saint. Father Sebastian officiated at their wedding on 9 November, 1897.

One of Boris's earliest memories was of the 1906 San Francisco earthquake.

His father was recalled to Russia in 1906, and the entire family returned to Russia in 1913.

In 1916–1917, both father and son joined the ranks of the Imperial Russian Army as it fought against Germany and the Austro-Hungarian Empire in World War I: Theodore – as a military chaplain, and 16-year-old Boris – as an artillery private in the 52nd Infantry Division. During the Russian Revolution, the family fled to Simferopol, Crimea, where Boris worked for the YMCA. By February 1920, Boris joined the White navy in the Black Sea and served on the navy cruiser General Kornilov. Boris saw action against the Bolsheviks at sea, and in March 1920, he was awarded the Cross of St. George, fourth class.

On 1 July 1920, he married Lydia Vladimirovna Ivanova and chose to return to the United States when the Bolshevik consolidation of power became apparent. He was able to secure employment with the YMCA in Berlin, where his son Edgar Constantine Boris Pashkovsky was born on 14 June 1921.

Upon returning to the United States with his family in 1923, he attended Springfield College, in Springfield, Massachusetts, where he graduated with a Bachelor of Physical Education. It was during this time that he changed the family name from Pashkovsky to Pash.

Pash taught and coached baseball at Hollywood High School in Los Angeles from 1924 until 1940, where students included Lana Turner, Judy Garland, and Mickey Rooney. During this time he continued his education, receiving a Master of Science in Education from the University of Southern California in 1939. He also joined the United States Army Reserve, and was assigned to the Infantry Intelligence Branch. As part of his training, he qualified for certification by the Federal Bureau of Investigation.

== World War II ==
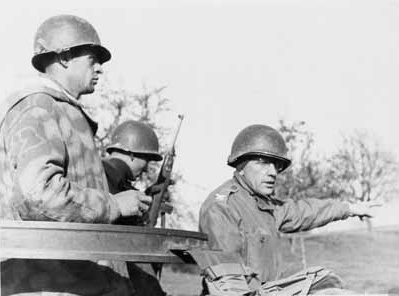
Boris Pash (right) in April 1945 with the Alsos Mission in Hechingen

Pash was called to active duty with the Army in 1940, and became chief of counterintelligence at the IX Corps Area headquarters at the Presidio of San Francisco. In that role he became involved with the 1942 Baja Peninsula mission that investigated the possibility of the Japanese establishing a base in Mexico during World War II.

Later, as Chief of Security for the Manhattan Project, he was called upon to investigate suspected Soviet espionage at the Radiation Laboratory at the University of California. He interrogated staff, including Robert Oppenheimer, whom he concluded "may still be connected with the Communist Party". Pash did not believe that Oppenheimer was a spy. He felt that Oppenheimer's personal honor and concern for his reputation would deter him from such action. Pash therefore did not recommend Oppenheimer's removal from the Manhattan Project, merely that Oppenheimer be accompanied by counter-intelligence agents.

He was also the military leader of the Alsos Mission, an Allied operation established in late 1943 to determine how far the Axis had progressed toward developing nuclear weapons by seizing facilities, materiel, and scientists related to the German nuclear energy project. During this mission, he had a heated run-in in Italy with Moe Berg, a former Major League Baseball catcher turned Office of Strategic Services (OSS) spy. On the mission in 1944, Pash personally carried radioactive materials for seven hours in his pocket, which led to a radiation burn (in his own words, it looked "like a map on my hip").

== Post war ==
After the war, Pash served in various military intelligence positions. He served under General Douglas MacArthur in Japan in 1946 and 1947. Thanks to his efforts, the Soviet attempt to gain a foothold in Japan through a local Orthodox Church failed. Instead, Pash organized for Bishop Benjamin (Basalyga) to arrive in early January 1947 to take the reins, and thus the North American Metropolia, rather than the then Soviet-controlled Moscow Patriarchate, secured influence in the region. As a result of this combination, Pash had a public clash with the Soviet General Kuzma Derevyanko. On 9 January, two days after the first sermon of the new bishop, a reception was held at the Dutch embassy at which Pash met his longtime acquaintance, Lieutenant General Derevyanko, who represented the USSR in the Allied Council for Japan. The rival picks of the Russian emigrant and the Soviet commander were well known; in addition, they sometimes played against one another in chess. Shaking the Russian-American's hand that winter day, Derevyanko publicly declared: "Ah, my good friend Colonel Pash has again checkmated me. Of course, you understand, I'm speaking of the game of chess." Boris retorted: "I can assure you, gentlemen, that the other times are in the line of duty."

From 1948 to 1951, he served as a military representative to the Central Intelligence Agency. During this time, he was in charge of a controversial CIA program called PB-7, which had been formed to handle "wet affairs" like kidnappings and assassinations. There is no evidence that he ever carried out any such activities, and denied that he had in testimony before the Church Committee in 1975. He served as Special Forces planning officer with the U.S. forces in Austria from 1952 to 1953. His final postings were back in the United States, as Deputy Assistant Chief of Staff for Intelligence of the Sixth Army from 1953 to 1956), and in the office of the Assistant Secretary of Defense for Guided Missiles in Washington, D.C., from 1956 until his retirement from the Army in 1957. In 1954, he testified in the Oppenheimer security hearing, recounting the misgivings that he had about Oppenheimer in 1943.

On leaving the Army, Pash became chief of the Eastern European and USSR Division of the Quartermaster Technological Intelligence Agency. In 1961, he transferred to the United States Army Foreign Science and Technology Center. He retired from the civil service in June 1963. In retirement, he helped rebuild the Saint Nicholas Orthodox Cathedral in Washington, DC.

In retirement, Pash published The Alsos Mission, a book recounting his wartime experiences in Europe, in 1980. The year 1981 saw the court hearings on the internment of the Japanese-Americans. Pash was one of the few officers alive to be brought to testify. Grilled hard by the judge, Pash did not relent and maintained that the unlawful actions against the American citizens needed to be assessed in the context of the 1940s, rather than in hindsight. He was inducted into the Military Intelligence Hall of Fame in 1988. His decorations included the Army Distinguished Service Medal, the Legion of Merit, the Order of the British Empire and the Order of St. George.

He was one of the few White Russian veterans to live to see the end of Communist Party rule in Russia. Pash died on 11 May 1995 in Greenbrae, California at the age of 94, and was buried in the Serbian Cemetery in Colma, California. He was survived by his wife Gladys and son Edgar. His papers are in the Hoover Institution at Stanford University.

== In popular culture ==
Pash was played by Casey Affleck in Christopher Nolan's 2023 film Oppenheimer.
