= Horst Korsching =

German physicist

Horst Korsching (12 August 1912 – 21 March 1998) was a German physicist. He was arrested by the allied British and American Armed Forces and incarcerated at Farm Hall for six months in 1945 under Operation Epsilon.

== Education ==
Born in Danzig, Korsching began his studies of physics at the Humboldt University of Berlin in 1932. In 1937, he joined the scientific staff at the Kaiser-Wilhelm Institut für Physik (KWIP, Kaiser Wilhelm Institute for Physics), an institute under the Kaiser-Wilhelm-Gesellschaft (KWG, Kaiser Wilhelm Society) and located in Dahlem-Berlin. He received his doctorate under Hermann Schüler.

== Career ==
At the KWIP, he was a colleague of Karl Wirtz, and his research was on determination of the nuclear moment and thermodiffusion. During the war years, he worked on isotope separation under Kurt Diebner and Werner Heisenberg. He went with the staff of the KWIP when it was moved to Hechingen in 1943 to avoid bombing casualties. In late spring 1945, Korsching was arrested by the allied British and American Armed Forces and incarcerated at Farm Hall for six months under Operation Epsilon.

From 1946, after his incarceration, Korsching worked at the Max-Planck Institut für Physik (MPIP), which was the renamed Kaiser-Wilhelm Institut für Physik and had been opened in the British Occupation Zone in Göttingen. In 1958, he moved with the MPIP when it was relocated to Munich.

== Internal report ==
The following were published in Kernphysikalische Forschungsberichte (Research Reports in Nuclear Physics), an internal publication of the German Uranverein. Reports in this publication were classified Top Secret, they had very limited distribution, and the authors were not allowed to keep copies. The reports were confiscated under the Allied Operation Alsos and sent to the United States Atomic Energy Commission for evaluation. In 1971, the reports were declassified and returned to Germany. The reports are available at the Karlsruhe Nuclear Research Center and the American Institute of Physics.

- Horst Korsching Trennung von schwerem und leichtem Benzol durch Termo-Diffusion in flüssiger Phase, 5 September 1941. G-102.
- Horst Korsching Zur Frage des Isotopeneffekts bei Thermodiffusion in flüssiger Phase, 25 February 1942. G-174.

== Selected literature ==
- H. Schüler und H. Korsching Zur Frage nach Gesetzmäßigkeiten beim Aufbau des Atomkernes, Naturwissenschaften Volume 24, Number 50, Pages 796-797 (December, 1936)
- Horst Korschung Quadrupolmoment von 83Kr36, 131Xe54 und mechanisches Moment von 83Kr36, Zeitschrift für Physik Volume 109, Numbers 5-6, Pages 349-357 (May, 1938). The author is cited as being at a facility in Berlin-Dahlem. The article was received 10 March 1938.
- H. Schüler und H. Korsching Magnetische Momente von 171, 173 Yb und Isotopenverschiebung beim Yb I , Zeitschrift für Physik Volume 111, Numbers 5-6, Pages 386-390 (May, 1938). The authors were cited as being at a facility in Berlin-Dahlem. The article was received 1 November 1938.
- Horst Korsching and Karl Wirtz Trennung von Flüssigkeitsgemischen mittels kombinierter Thermodiffusion und Thermosiphonwirkung: Methode von Clusius und Dickel, Naturwissenschaften Volume 27, Number 7, Page 110 (February, 1939)
- Horst Korsching Trennung von Benzol und Hexadeuterobenzol durch Thermodiffusion in der Flüssigkeit, Naturwissenschaften Volume 31, Numbers 29-30, Pages 348-349 (July, 1943)
- Horst Korsching Ein abgeändertes Verfahren bei der Trennung von Lösungsbestandteilen durch Thermodiffusion in der Flüssigkeit, Naturwissenschafte Volume 32, Numbers 27-39, Page 220 (July, 1944)

== Books ==
- Horst Korsching and Karl Wirtz Trennung der Zinkisotope durch Thermodiffusion in flüssiger Phase (Verlag der Akademie der Wissenschaften, 1939)

== Bibliography ==
- Bernstein, Jeremy Hitler’s Uranium Club: The Secret Recording’s at Farm Hall (Copernicus, 2001) ISBN 0-387-95089-3
- Hentschel, Klaus, editor and Ann M. Hentschel, editorial assistant and Translator Physics and National Socialism: An Anthology of Primary Sources (Birkhäuser, 1996) ISBN 0-8176-5312-0
- Walker, Mark German National Socialism and the Quest for Nuclear Power 1939–1949 (Cambridge, 1993) ISBN 0-521-43804-7
