= Operation Harborage =

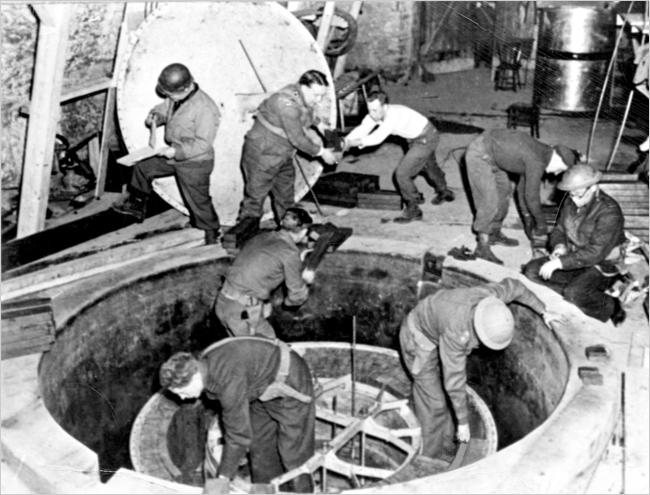
U.S. and British engineers dismantle the nuclear pile that German scientists had built up under the Uranprojekt program in Haigerloch in April 1945

Operation Harborage was an operation to capture German nuclear energy program scientists, materiel, and facilities in southwestern Germany in the waning days of World War II.

== History ==
Part of the Allied Alsos Mission, Operation Harborage (Note: There appears to be some overlap or confusion with Operation Big, as the same cities are targeted and same basic narratives attached) was led by Manhattan Project intelligence division chief Col. John Lansdale, Jr. on behalf of project head General Leslie Groves, under the direction of Alsos commander Col. Boris Pash. It was carried out by Alsos team members assisted by combat engineers from the 1269th Engineer Combat Battalion, the U.S. Sixth Army's T-Force intelligence assault force.

Shortly after the liberation of Paris it was decided to bomb German nuclear facilities wherever they lay in order to deprive the Soviet Union of their technology and personnel, unless American troops could get to them first. In late April 1945 Harborage teams were directed toward the Black Forest cities of Hechingen, Bisingen and Haigerloch. These centers of the relocated German effort were all scheduled to be seized by the French and occupied by them post-war.

By cutting ahead of the French First Army's forward troops and operating behind enemy lines American technical intelligence units swept the area clean, seizing and transporting what they could and destroying the rest. (Note: Note there are detailed alternative accounts of what and whom was found where, including: Beck, Alfred M, et al, United States Army in World War II: The Technical Services – The Corps of Engineers: The War Against Germany, 1985 Chapter 24, Into the Heart of Germany, p. 556-559 and Atomic Heritage Foundation:The Alsos Mission) The result left the French deprived of a share of the boost German technology and brainpower provided other Allies through the Cold War; these ended up divided among the U.S. (which reaped the lion's share), Soviet Union, and Britain.

== See also ==
- Operation Big
- Operation Epsilon

== Notes ==
Footnotes
