= Engineer Combat Battalion =

Military unit of US Army Corps of Engineers

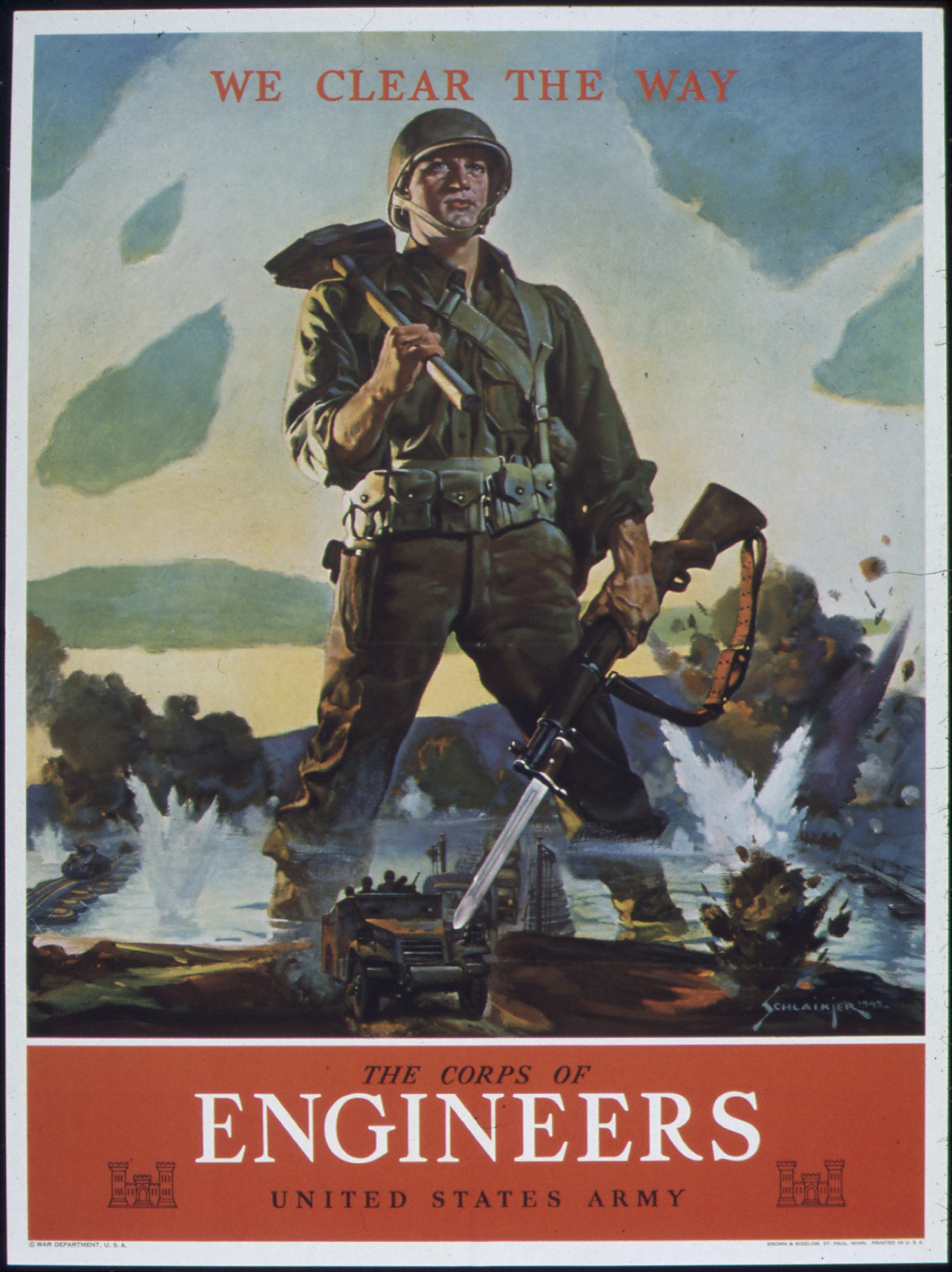
World War II recruiting poster for the U.S. Army Corps of Engineers

An Engineer Combat Battalion (ECB) was a designation for a battalion-strength combat engineer unit in the U.S. Army, most prevalent during World War II. They are a component of the United States Army Corps of Engineers. Also known as "Combat Engineer Battalions", they were typically divided into four companies: A, B, C, and Headquarters and Service (H&S). Best known for pontoon bridge construction and clearing hazards in amphibious landings, their duties also included serving as sappers deploying and deactivating explosive charges and unexploded munitions, mapmaking, camouflage, and a wide variety of construction services supporting frontline troops. With a secondary mission of fighting as infantry when required, they were armed with .30 cal. and .50 cal. machine guns, bazookas and grenade launchers.

Combat engineers played important roles in numerous World War II battles, especially breaching the heavily fortified Siegfried Line protecting the German border and numerous defensive lines established by the Wehrmacht in Italy, including the Gustav Line. Among the most familiar for their heroism and contributions to establishing key bridgeheads in Europe was at the Ludendorff Bridge at the Battle of Remagen. Combat engineers also played roles in several unconventional operations, including the securing of elements of the German nuclear weapons program in Operation Big and recovery of stolen art and treasure subsequently returned to its original owners by the Monuments Men.

In the Pacific Theater, the U.S. Army's 42nd Combat Engineers took part in the hard-fought high casualty Battle of Attu Aleutian Islands (1943) and the Battle of Manila, Luzon Philippines (1945), earning 2 Battle Stars. In the early morning of 29 May 1943, the 50th Combat Engineers were the first U S Army unit encountered by the last Japanese troops on the island, making a suicide charge toward artillery atop Engineer Hill. 50th Engineers fought back immediately and kept fighting while nearby combat units arrived.

== Capabilities ==
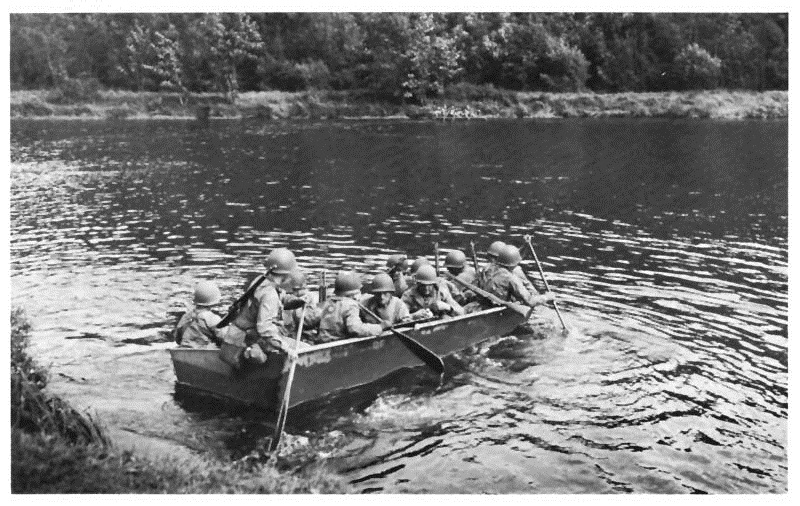
Combat Engineers ferried infantry and special forces troops in craft such as this M2 assault boat at Dornot-Corny, Lorraine in World War II

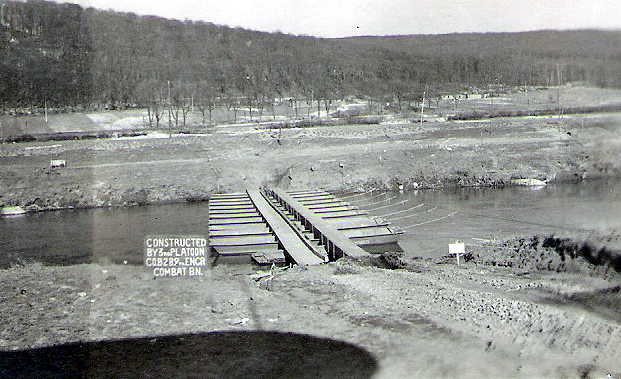
Infantry support bridge over the Saar River erected by 289th Combat Engineers at Volklingen, Germany

A World War II era combat engineer battalion possessed both combat and combat support capabilities. These included, but were not limited to:

- Bridge (mobile, floating, fixed), rail, & road construction and maintenance
- Conducting river crossings by pontoon/raft, motor-powered assault boats
- Demolition
- Placing/de-arming munitions, including mines
- Port & harbor maintenance and rehabilitation, including beachheads:

- Laying roads and unloading/loading supplies, vehicles & personnel from transport and cargo ships

- Camouflage
- Water supply and sanitation
- Map production
- Vehicle maintenance
- Establishing/maintaining supply and ammunition dumps
- Building barracks, depots, and similar structures
- Rescue & road patrols, bridge and road reconnaissance
- Clearing of debris and wreckage
- Unit defense and intelligence
- Fighting as infantry when needed

== US units ==
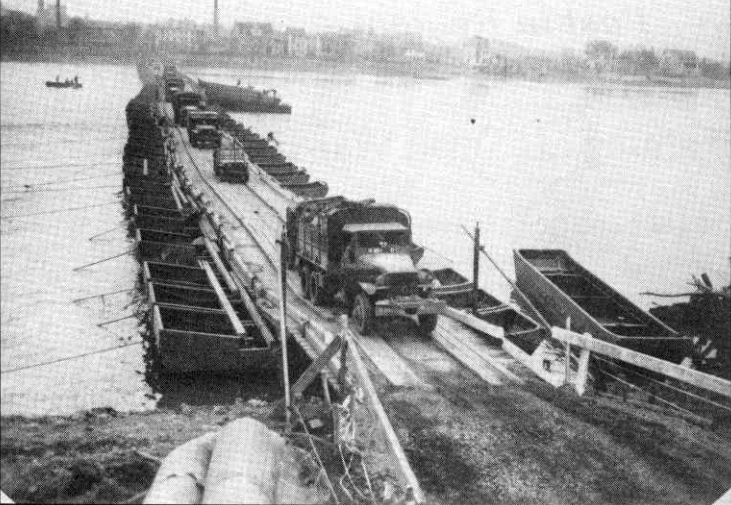
Pontoon bridge built by the 51st Engineer Combat Battalion across the Rhine, upstream from the Ludendorff Bridge at Remagen

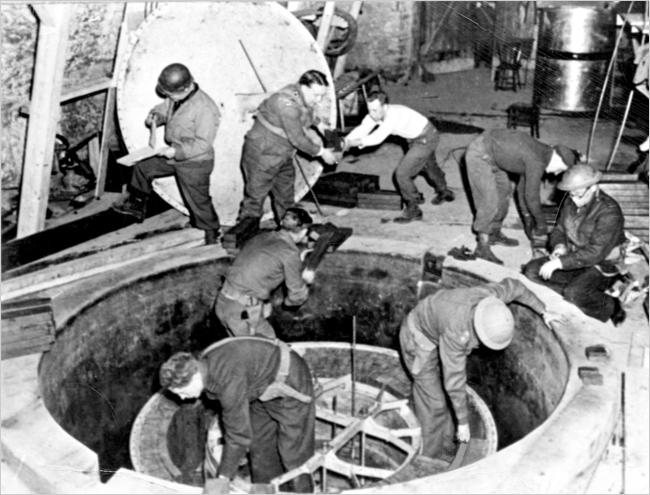
1269th engineers attached to the technology-capturing T-Force of the Alsos Mission dismantle a nuclear pile built by German scientists in Haigerloch, Germany, April 1945

Combat Engineer Battalions in the U.S. military include:

- 1st Engineer Combat Battalion
- 2nd Engineer Combat Battalion
- 5th Engineer Battalion
- 9th Engineer Combat Battaltion
- 13th Engineer Combat Battalion
- 14th Engineer Combat Battalion
- 15th Engineer Battalion
- 16th Engineer Battalion
- 19th Combat Engineer Battalion
- 20th Engineer Battalion
- 23rd Engineer Battalion
- 31st Engineer Combat Battalion
- 41st Engineer Battalion
- 35th Engineer Combat Battalion
- 42nd Engineer Combat Battalion
- 50th Engineer Combat Battalion
- 51st Engineer Combat Battalion
- 57th Engineer Combat Battalion
- 65th Engineer Battalion
- 82nd Engineer Combat Battalion
- 84th Engineer Combat Battalion
- 114th Engineer Combat Battalion
- 131st Engineer Combat Battalion
- 135th Engineer Combat Battalion
- 146th Engineer Combat Battalion
- 150th Engineer Combat Battalion
- 166th Engineer Combat Battalion
- 206th Engineer Combat Battalion
- 207th Engineer Combat Battalion
- 208th Engineer Combat Battalion (WW II)
- 234th Engineer Combat Battalion (WW II)
- 237th Engineer Combat Battalion
- 238th Engineer Combat Battalion
- 244th Combat Engineers
- 246th Engineer Combat Battalion (WW II)
- 248th Engineer Combat Battalion
- 249th Engineer Combat Battalion
- 250th Engineer Combat Battalion (WW II)
- 254th Engineer Combat Battalion
- 257th Engineer Combat Battalion (WW II)
- 258th Engineer Combat Battalion (WW II)
- 279th Engineer Combat Battalion
- 283rd Engineer Combat Battalion
- 284th Engineer Combat Battalion https://284thcombatengineers.com/
- 289th Engineer Combat Battalion
- 291st Engineer Combat Battalion
- 296th Engineer Combat Battalion
- 298th Engineer Combat Battalion
- 297th Engineer Combat Battalion
- 299th Engineer Combat Battalion
- 305th Engineer Combat Battalion, 80th Infantry Division, Third Army https://lonesentry.com/S12/index.html
- 311th Engineer Combat Battalion, 8th Blackhawk Division, European Theater
- 315th Engineer Combat Battalion (WWII)
- 372nd Engineer General Service Regiment(WWII)
- 402nd Engineer Battalion
- 554th Engineer Battalion
- 864th Engineer Battalion
- 876th Engineer Battalion
- 1255th Engineer Combat Battalion
- 1263rd Engineer Combat Battalion
- 1269th Engineer Combat Battalion
- 1288th Engineer Combat Battalion
- 1695th Engineer Combat Battalion

== See also ==
- Bailey bridge
- 1st Combat Engineer Battalion (United States Marine Corps)
