= 5th Battalion, King's Regiment (Liverpool) =

1st Lancashire Rifle Volunteer Corps 5th Battalion, King's Regiment (Liverpool)
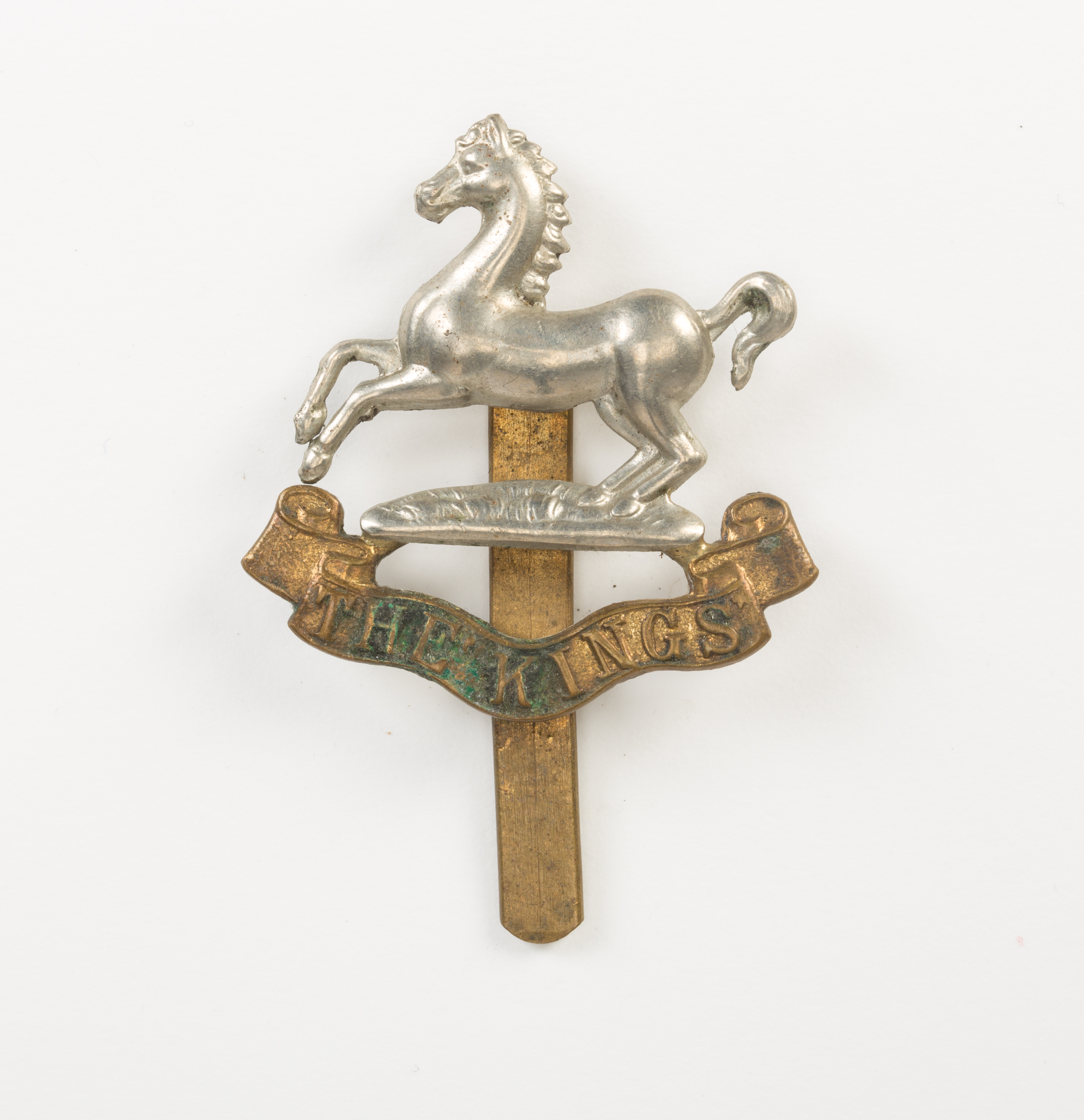
- Badge of the King's Regiment (Liverpool), 1908–1927. A version with black metal was worn by the 5th King's.
- Active: 28 June 1859–1 April 1967
- Country: United Kingdom
- Branch: Volunteer Force/Territorial Force/Territorial Army
- Type: Infantry
- Size: 1–3 Battalions
- Part of: 55th (West Lancashire) Division
- Garrison/HQ: 65 St Anne Street, Liverpool
- Engagements: World War I: Battle of Festubert; Battle of Loos; Battle of the Somme; Third Battle of Ypres; Battle of Cambrai; Battle of the Lys; Hundred Days Offensive; World War II; D Day; North West Europe

Commanders
- Notable commanders: Nathaniel Bousfield

The 5th Battalion, King's Regiment (Liverpool) (5th King's) was a volunteer unit of the King's Regiment (Liverpool) of the British Army. It traced its heritage to the raising in 1859 of a number rifle volunteer corps in Liverpool, which were soon consolidated into the 1st Lancashire Rifle Volunteer Corps (RVC). It was affiliated to the King's Regiment (Liverpool), and became its 1st Volunteer Battalion of the regiment. In 1908 the battalion was transferred to the new Territorial Force as the 5th Battalion, King's Regiment (Liverpool). It saw active service on the Western Front during World War I, as did its second line second-line battalion, and even a garrison battalion. Before World War II it again formed a second line battalion. Both served in home defence, but the 5th King's landed in Normandy on D Day as part of a specialist beach group 1939. When the Territorial Army was reduced in 1967, the 5th King's became a company of the Lancastrian Volunteers.

== Volunteer Force ==
The 1st Lancashire RVC of three companies was raised in Liverpool, Lancashire, by Nathaniel Bousfield, one of the originators of the Volunteer movement; his commission as Captain-Commandant dated 11 June 1859 was the first to be issued in the new Volunteer Force. A Liverpool cotton broker, he had made several attempts since 1852 to raise a volunteer unit in the city, and in 1855 had founded the Liverpool Drill Club from young men in the cotton trade who drilled twice weekly in his warehouse. Other corps quickly followed and in May 1860 a number of these units in the Liverpool area were grouped together as the 1st Administrative Battalion, Lancashire RVCs:

- 1st (Liverpool) Lancashire RVC, three companies, formed 28 June 1859
- 22nd (Liverpool Exchange) Lancashire RVC, two companies, formed 30 January 1860; left 1st Admin Battalion December 1861 and disbanded 1863
- 38th (Liverpool) Lancashire RVC, formed in the Fairfield area on 20 January 1860 and known as the 1st Sub-division until March
- 45th Lancashire RVC, formed in Liverpool on 27 February 1860
- 66th (Liverpool Borough Guard) Lancashire RVC, formed on 25 April 1860
- 69th (Liverpool) Lancashire RVC, formed on 31 May 1860

These units (except the 22nd) were consolidated on 27 December 1861 to form the eight-company 1st Lancashire RVC. The 14th (Edge Hill) Lancashire RVC of two companies was formed in the Edge Hill area on 10 November 1859 and known as the 2nd Sub-Division until December. It initially joined the 2nd Admin Battalion, but transferred to the new 1st RVC in December 1861. The 74th (St Anne's) Lancashire RVC formed in the St Anne's area on 2 July 1860 was also absorbed into the 1st Lancashire RVC in 1862. A cadet corps of the RVC was formed in April 1865, but disbanded in 1884. The Rev John Howson was appointed Honorary Chaplain in 1865, but later transferred to the 80th (Liverpool Press Guard) Lancashire RVC.

=== Cardwell Reforms ===
Under the 'Localisation of the Forces' scheme introduced by the Cardwell Reforms of 1872, volunteer battalions were brigaded with their local regular and Militia battalions. Sub-District No 13 (County of Lancashire) was formed in Northern District with headquarters at Liverpool and the following units assigned:

- 8th (The King's) Regiment of Foot (2 battalions)
- 2nd Royal Lancashire Militia (The Duke of Lancaster's Own Rifles) (2 battalions)
- 1st Lancashire RVC (with 48th and 54th Lancashire RVCs attached)
- 5th (Liverpool Volunteer Rifle Brigade) Lancashire RVC
- 64th (Liverpool Irish) Lancashire RVC
- 80th (Liverpool Press Guard) Lancashire RVC

The 1st Lancashire RVC became a volunteer battalion of The King's (Liverpool Regiment) under the Childers Reforms on 1 July 1881 with 10 companies, and was redesignated as the 1st Volunteer Battalion of the regiment on 1 March 1888. Two more companies were sanctioned in 1883, followed by a 13th in 1900 when the Volunteers were expanded during the Second Boer War.

While the sub-districts were referred to as 'brigades', they were purely administrative organisations and the volunteers were excluded from the 'mobilisation' part of the Cardwell system. The Stanhope Memorandum of December 1888 proposed a more comprehensive Mobilisation Scheme for volunteer units, which would assemble in their own brigades at key points in case of war. In peacetime these brigades provided a structure for collective training. Under this scheme the Volunteer Battalions of the King's (Liverpool Regiment), together with VBs from other regiments based in Lancashire and Cheshire formed a large and unwieldy Mersey Brigade. By 1900 the brigade consisted only of the 1st–6th and 8th Volunteer Bns King's.

== Territorial Force ==
When the Volunteers were subsumed into the new Territorial Force (TF) under the Haldane Reforms of 1908, the battalion became the 5th Battalion, King's Regiment (Liverpool), on 1 April 1908, It remained in the Liverpool Brigade, assigned to the TF's West Lancashire Division. It was headquartered at 65 St Anne Street in Liverpool, which served as the drill hall for the eight-company battalion.

== World War I ==
=== Mobilisation ===
At the outbreak of World War I the West Lancashire Division had just begun its annual training and when mobilisation was ordered on 4 August 1914 the units were sent back to their drill halls. The 5th King's mobilised at St Anne St under the command of Lieutenant Colonel J. M. McMaster and went to its war station guarding the London, Brighton and South Coast Railway, then joined the rest of the Liverpool Brigade at Canterbury in Kent.

The TF was intended to be a home defence force for service during wartime and members could not be compelled to serve outside the country. However, on 10 August 1914 TF units were invited to volunteer for overseas service and the majority did so. On 15 August, the War Office issued instructions to separate those men who had signed up for Home Service only, and form these into reserve units. On 31 August, the formation of a reserve or 2nd Line unit was authorised for each 1st Line unit where 60 per cent or more of the men had volunteered for Overseas Service. The titles of these 2nd Line units would be the same as the original, but distinguished by a '2/' prefix. In this way duplicate battalions, brigades and divisions were created, mirroring those TF formations being sent overseas.

=== 1/5th King's ===
In October 1914 the West Lancashire Division concentrated in Kent. However, the division was progressively broken up to reinforce the British Expeditionary Force fighting on the Western Front. The 1/5th King's was one of the units that left, landing at Le Havre on 22 February 1915 and joining 6th Brigade in 2nd Division. It served with 2nd Division in the following actions:

- Battle of Festubert: in the successful night attack of 15 May 1/5th King's were in reserve, providing carrying parties for the assaulting troops; further attacks next day were stopped by enemy fire. On 17 May the battalion was in support. Nevertheless, it suffered a number of casualties in these actions.
- In August 1/5th King's was attached temporarily to 2nd Divisional HQ to act as pioneers, probably because of the amount of Tunnel warfare and crater fighting on the division's front. It was not employed in 6th Bde's disastrous attack at the Battle of Loos on 25 September. The battalion was brought back into the divisional area that night to relieve troops for a renewed attack. By 1 October 6 Bde was holding part of 'Gun Trench' near the Hohenzollern Redoubt, with 1/5th King's in support. They were relieved on 3/4 October, and although they went back into the line on 13 October they were not engaged in the Actions of the Hohenzollern Redoubt.

On 15 December 1/5th King's transferred to 99th Brigade, still in 2nd Division, but left on 7 January 1916 to rejoin its brigade in the West Lancashire Division, which were being reformed in France as 165th (Liverpool) Brigade and 55th (West Lancashire) Division respectively. It remained with this formation until the end of the war, taking part in the following engagements:

- Battle of the Somme:
  - Battle of Guillemont: in an attack here on 8 August 1/5th King's achieved the only small gain of the day. After the main attack on 3 September patrols of 1/5th King's penetrated deeply into High Wood and consolidated the captured ground.

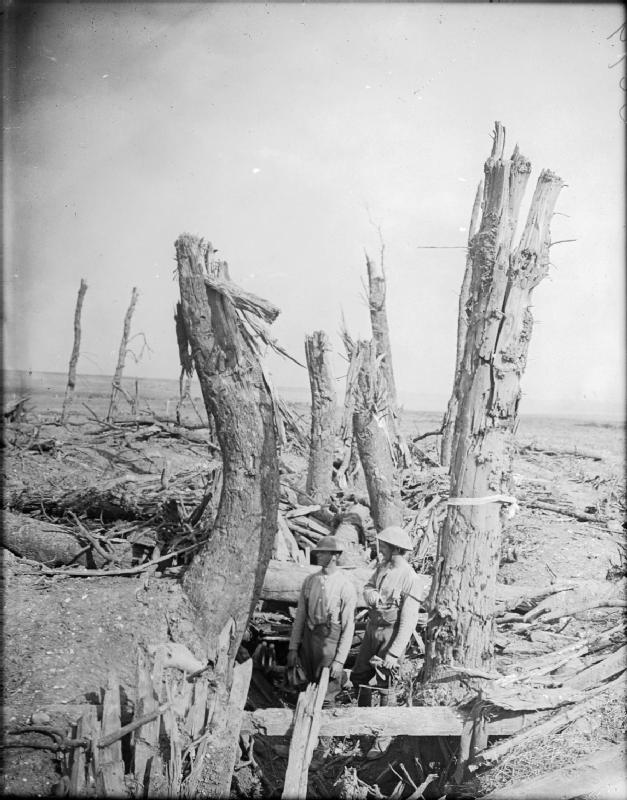
British soldiers in a wrecked German trench at Ginchy, 1916.

  - Battle of Ginchy (9 September): the battalion successfully 'bombed' their way into the trench known as Wood Lane.
  - Battle of Flers–Courcelette (17–22 September)

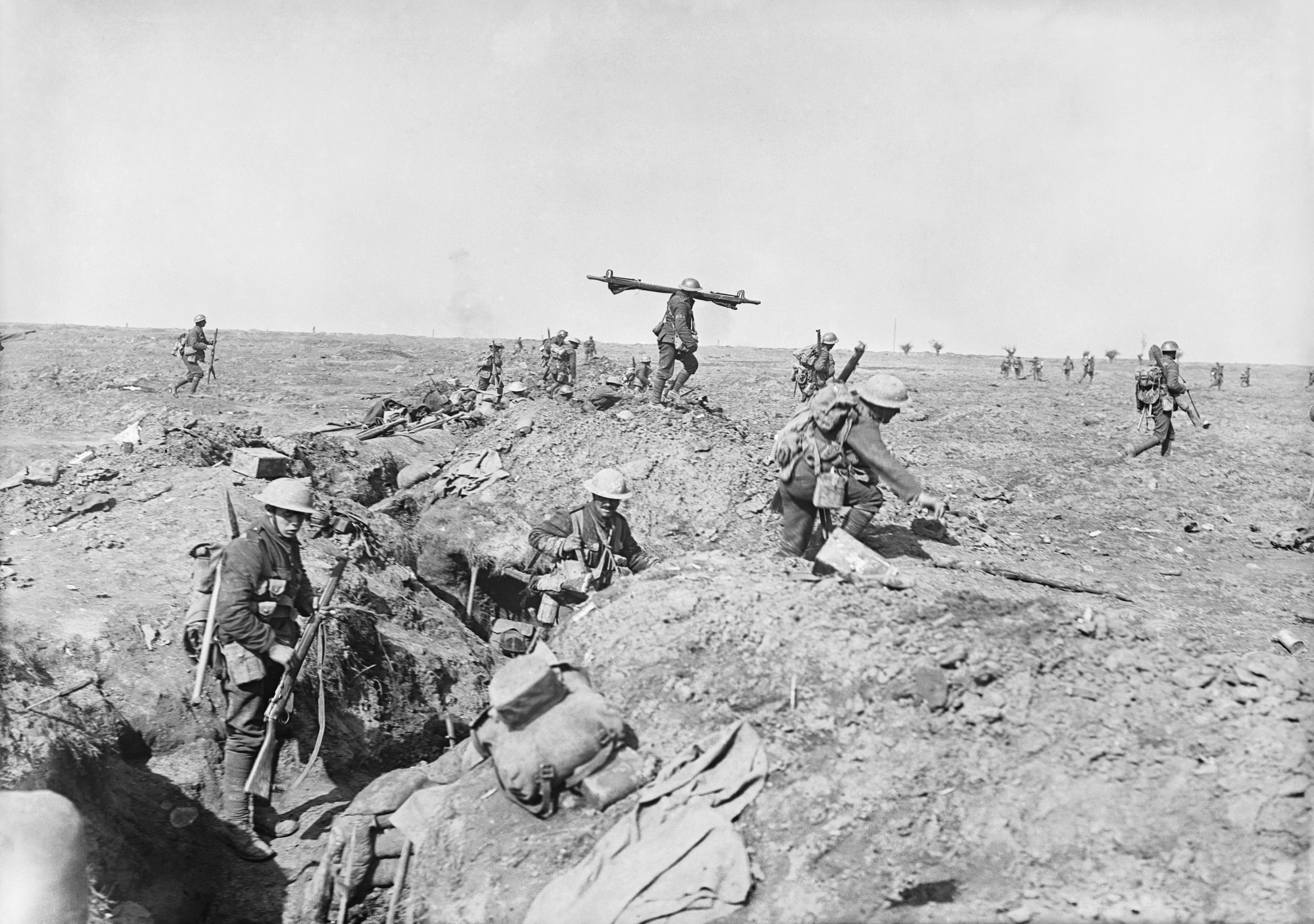
British infantry at Morval, 25 September 1916.

  - Battle of Morval (25–28 September): 165th Bde seized its first and second objectives near Gueudecourt, then 1/5th King's went up from reserve to reinforce the position.
- Third Battle of Ypres:
  - Battle of Pilckem Ridge (31 July –2 August 1917)
  - Battle of the Menin Road Ridge (20–23 September)
- Battle of Cambrai (20–21 November): 55th (WL) Division had to go back into the line when the Germans counter-attacked on 30 November. 1/5th King's held Fleeceall Post, driving off a frontal attack, but the rest of the brigade suffered severely.

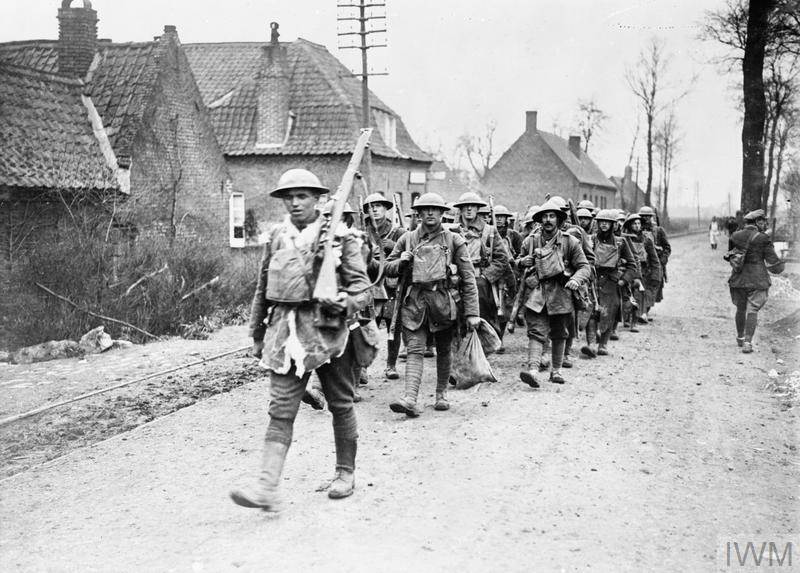
Men of 55th (WL) Division marching through Béthune after the defence of Givenchy, April 1918.

- Battle of the Lys:
  - Battle of Estaires: 1/5th King's was the left hand battalion of the division when the Germans broke through the neighbouring Portuguese troops on 9 April; although attacked in flank, the battalion's outposts fell back fighting according to plan, first to the 'Old British Line' and then to the 'Line of Resistance', where the battalion held its positions for the rest of the day. 55th (WL) Division then fought in the Defence of Givenchy. On 11 April Lt-Col A. Buckley, commanding 1/5th King's organised on his own initiative a successful local counter-attack by all available troops, including part of 13th King's. On 13 April, 'Route A Keep' captured by the Germans on 9 April, was recovered by a night attack by 165th (2/1st L) Bde employing an extemporised company composed of men from 1/5th, 1/6th, 10th and 13th Bns, King's, preceded by a 'crash' barrage lasting just 3 minutes.
- Hundred Days Offensive:
  - Capture of Givenchy Craters (24 August)
  - Capture of Canteleux Trench (17 September)
  - Pursuit to Mons (2 October–11 November)

The battalion was at Ath in Belgium when the Armistice with Germany came into force on 11 November. 1/5th King's was demobilised on 13 June 1919.

=== 2/5th King's ===
The 2/5th Bn King's was formed at Liverpool in September 1914. In November it was sent to Blackpool, and in February 1915 it went to Canterbury where the 1st and 2nd Line Liverpool Brigades had been temporarily combined under a single commander. The 2nd Line brigade and division were numbered as 171st (2/1st Liverpool) Brigade in 57th (2nd West Lancashire) Division on 1 August 1915. Until November the infantry only had obsolete .256-in Japanese Ariska rifles with which to train; then they were given salvaged Lee–Enfield .303-inch rifles in poor condition. At this time 57th (2nd WL) Division formed part of Second Army of Central Force in Home Forces, but in July 1916 it moved into the Emergency Reserve around Aldershot, with 2/5th King's at Bourley. In September it moved to Woking.

In January 1917 57th (2nd WL) Division was released for service with the BEF, and the units crossed to France in February, taking their place in the line on 25 February. The division took part in the Second Battle of Passchendaele (26 October–7 November) during the Third Ypres Offensive.

By early 1918 the BEF was suffering a manpower crisis and 2/5th King's was broken up on 1 February 1918 to reinforce other battalions of the regiment: 2/6th (Rifles), 2/7th, 11th (Service) (Pioneers) and 12th (Service).

=== 3/5th King's ===
The 3/5th King's was formed at Liverpool in May 1915 and moved to Blackpool in the Autumn. Its role was to train reinforcement drafts for the 1st and 2nd Line battalions. By early 1916 it was at the training camp at Oswestry. It was redesignated 5th (Reserve) Bn, King's, on 8 April 1916, and on 1 September it absorbed 6th (Reserve) (Rifle) Bn. It formed part of the West Lancashire Reserve Brigade at Oswestry for the rest of the war.

The battalion was disbanded on 12 June 1919.

=== 25th King's ===
The remaining Home Service men of the TF were separated when the 3rd Line battalions were raised in May 1915, and were formed into Provisional Battalions for home defence. The men of 5th King's joined with those from the 6th (Rifle) Bn to form 43rd Provisional Battalion at Sheringham in Norfolk. It joined 3rd Provisional Brigade in the defences of East Anglia.

The Military Service Act 1916 swept away the Home/Foreign service distinction, and all TF soldiers became liable for overseas service, if medically fit. The Provisional Brigades thus became anomalous, and their units became numbered battalions of their parent units. On 1 January 1917 43rd Provisional Battalion became 25th Battalion, King's in 223rd Bde. Part of the role of the former provisional units was physical conditioning to render men fit for drafting overseas, and 25th Kings landed at Calais as a 'Garrison Guard' battalion on 7 May 1918. In France it was attached to 59th (2nd North Midland) Division at Estrée-Cauchy, and on 16 June it joined 176th (2/1st Staffordshire) Brigade in that formation. By mid-July the 'Garrison Guard' title had been dropped and it became a fighting battalion, serving with 176th Bde at the Battle of Albert (21–23 August) and the final advance in Artois and Flanders.

On 21–22 October Fifth Army was closing up to the Schelde and 59th (2nd NM) Division tried to establish bridgeheads across the river. A chain stretching across the river was found at Esquelmes and a ferry extemporised; 25th King's went across, but the men found themselves waist deep in marshy ground on the far bank. Nevertheless, they made contact as ordered with Second Army at Pecq. By the Armistice the battalion had reached Velaines, north-east of Tournai.

25th King's continued serving after the war, and was finally disbanded in Egypt on 28 March 1920.

== Interwar ==
When the TF was reconstituted on 7 February 1920, 5th King's was reformed. It was planned to have been amalgamated with 6th (Rifle) Bn, King's, by 1922, but the order was rescinded. 5th King's did however carry the '(Rifle)' subtitle until 1937. The parent regiment altered its title to King's Regiment (Liverpool) from 1 January 1921, and the TF was reorganised as the Territorial Army (TA) later that year/ The battalion continued in 165th (Liverpool) Infantry Brigade in 55th (West Lancashire Division.

After the Munich Crisis of 1938, the TA was doubled in size and most units formed duplicates. The 5th King's was ordered to raise a duplicate battalion on 31 March 1939, and this was formed in May. It was designated 9th Battalion, taking the number of a TF battalion that had fought in World War I and had afterwards been converted into the divisional engineers.

== World War II ==
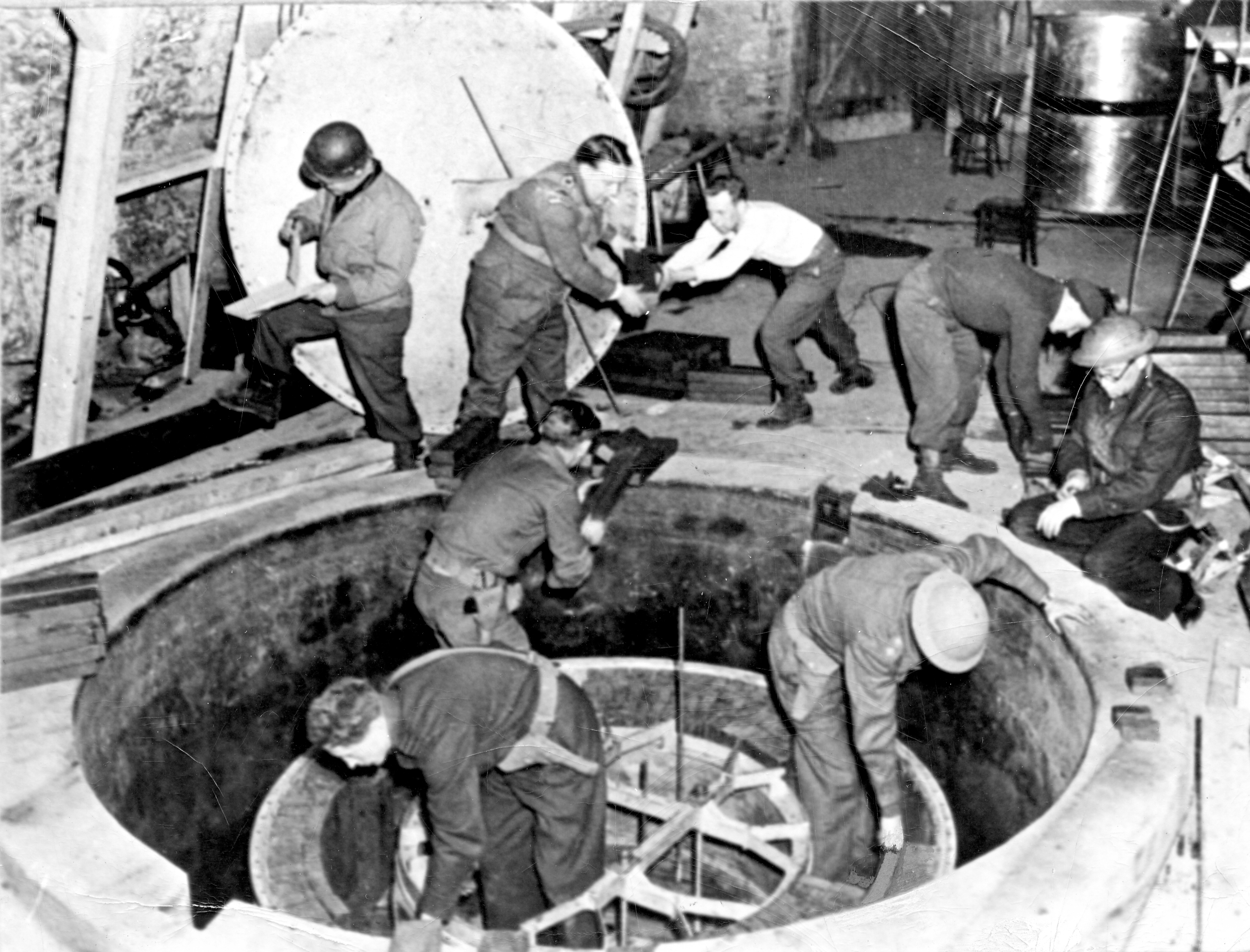
British and American members of T-Force's Alsos Mission dismantle the experimental nuclear reactor that German scientists had built as part of the German nuclear energy project seized during Operation Big. T-Force units were lightly armed and highly mobile. British troops included two companies of the 1st Buckinghamshire Battalion, a territorial army battalion of the Oxfordshire and Buckinghamshire Light Infantry, along with the 5th Battalion King's Regiment (Liverpool). American units comprised infantry and combat engineers, including the 1269th Engineer Combat Battalion.

=== 5th King's ===
The TA was mobilised on 1 September 1939, and war was declared on 3 September. 5th King's remained in 165th (Merseyside) Bde of 55th (WL) Division, which was organised as a motor division. However, it did not go to France with the British Expeditionary Force (BEF) and remained in the UK. After the BEF was evacuated from Dunkirk, 55th (WL) Division was converted into a conventional infantry division in June 1940, serving in II Corps in East Anglia. It remained in home defence, and in January 1942 it was placed on a lower establishment, indicating that it would not be deployed oversea

5th King's left 55th (WL) Division on 16 April 1943, and on 18 July it joined 163rd Infantry Brigade of the 54th (East Anglian) Infantry Division. This division eased to exist on 14 December 1943, when divisional HQ became HQ Lines of Communications for 21st Army Group, and many of it units were assigned roles in the forthcoming Allied invasion of Normandy (Operation Overlord). 5th King's was assigned to No 5 Beach Group as its infantry component, and landed with it on Sword Beach on D day (6 June 1944). After the successful completion of the assault landing phase of Overlord, 5th King's continued to serve with 21st Army Group on line of communication duties for the remainder of the campaign in North West Europe. The battalion was placed in suspended animation in 1945.

=== 9th King's ===
9th King's mobilised in 164th Brigade of 55th (WL) Division. After the division was reduced to lower establishment, the battalion left on 17 September 1942 to join 206th Independent Infantry Bde. This was initially attached to 46th Division, but that formation was preparing to embark for the Allied invasion of North Africa (Operation Torch), so from 1 December 1942 206th Bde was attached to 43rd (Wessex) Division, which was training for Overlord in Kent.

9th King's returned to 55th (WL) Division on 12 April 1943 joining 165th Bde. The division served in Northern Ireland from 21 December 1943 until July 1944. When it returned to the UK, 9th King's left the division. Most formations in Home Forces were by now committed to supplying reinforcements to the units fighting overseas. 9th King's passed into suspended animation on 21 March 1946.

== Postwar ==
When the TA was formally reconstituted on 1 January 1947, the 5th and 9th battalions were amalgamated and reformed as 5th King's. Its successor in the Territorial and Army Volunteer Reserve from 1967 was B (King's) Company, Lancastrian Volunteers.

== Honorary Colonels ==
Successive Earls of Derby served as honorary colonel of the battalion during its existence:

- Edward Smith-Stanley, 14th Earl of Derby, appointed 10 September 1862, died 23 October 1869
- Edward Stanley, 15th Earl of Derby, appointed 21 September 1870, died 23 April 1893
- Frederick Stanley, 16th Earl of Derby, appointed 15 January 1894, died 14 June 1908
- Edward Stanley, 17th Earl of Derby, TD, appointed 15 June 1908, died 4 February 1948
- John Stanley, 18th Earl of Derby, MC, TD, Lt-Col King's Regiment (Liverpool) 1947, and Hon Col of the TA battalion and its successors until 1967
