= SS Claymont Victory =

Victory ship of the United States

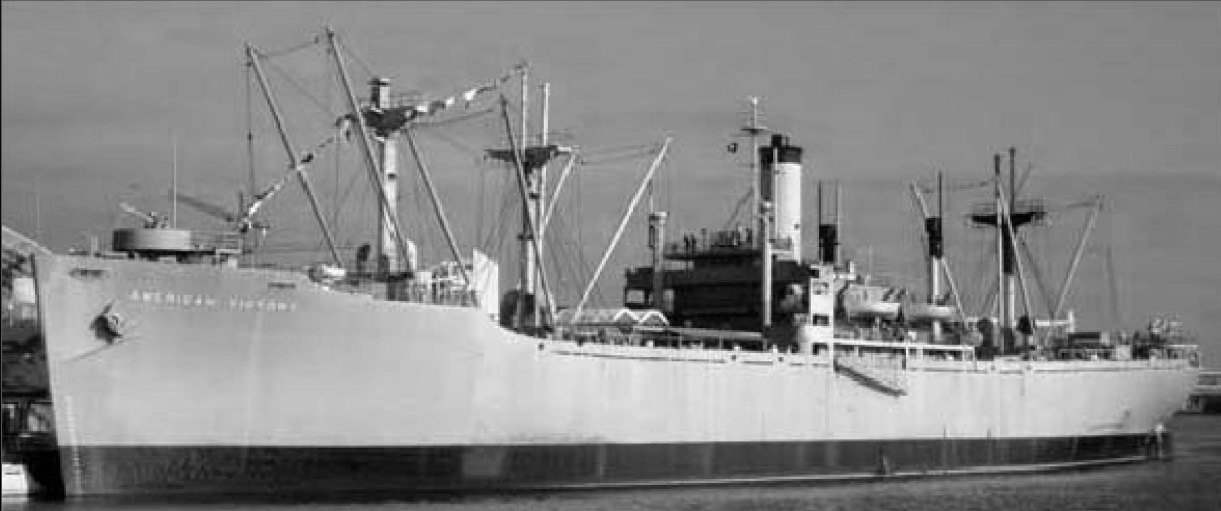
- VC2-S-AP2 type ship

History

United States
- Name: SS Claymont Victory
- Namesake: City of Claymont, Delaware
- Builder: Bethlehem-Fairfield Shipyard Corp. Baltimore, Maryland
- Laid down: September 25, 1944
- Launched: November 18, 1944
- Sponsored by: Mrs. Ruth Holt
- Acquired: December 15, 1944
- Out of service: 1971
- Fate: Scrapped 1971

General characteristics
- Tonnage: 7,607 Tons (Gross), 4,551 Tons (Net)
- Displacement: 15,200 Tons (Full Load), 10,8750 Tons (Lightweight)
- Length: 455 ft (139 m)
- Beam: 62 ft (19 m)
- Draft: 28 ft 0 in (8.53 m)
- Propulsion: 2 B&W oil-fired steam boilers, 2 steam turbines, single propeller, 6,000shp
- Speed: 16 knots
- Capacity: 1597
- Armament: 5" 38 Dual Purpose Gun, 3" Anti-Aircraft Gun, 8 20MM Caliber Guns
- Notes: Hull Type: C2-S-AP2; MCV hull #612

SS Claymont Victory was a type Victory ship-based VC2-S-AP2 troop transport built for the U.S. Army Transportation Corps late in World War II. Launched in November 1944, it saw service in the European Theater of Operations during 1945 and in the immediate post-war period repatriating U.S. troops.

After being briefly laid up in the U.S. Claymont Victory was purchased by Vereenigde Nederlandsche Scheepvaartmaatschapppij of the Netherlands and renamed Mariekerk. In 1966 she was sold to Kavo Compañia Naviera S.A., of Greece and renamed Kavo Longos. She was scrapped at Whampoa Dock, Hong Kong, in 1971.

== History ==
=== Construction and operation ===
SS Claymont Victory was laid down on September 25, 1944, as a U.S. MARCOM Type C2 ship-based VC2-S-AP2 hull by Bethlehem-Fairfield Shipyard of Baltimore, Maryland. Launched on November 18, 1944, she was then converted into a dedicated troopship, and delivered on December 15, 1944. She was operated on behalf of USAT by Eastern Steamship Lines.

=== World War II ===
As a transport allocated to the U.S. Army USAT Claymont Victory was crewed by United States Merchant Marines, protected by a contingent of the US Naval Armed Guards, and had a complement of the US Army Transportation Corps (Water Division) aboard for troop administration.

She was armed with a 5 inch (127 mm) stern gun for use against submarines and surface ships, a bow-mounted 3"/50 caliber gun and eight 20 mm cannon for use against aircraft.

==== Units transported ====
Units transported by the SS Claymont Victory include:

- 289th Engineer Combat Battalion, which departed Antwerp, Belgium August 14, 1945, for deployment to the Pacific Theater in preparation for the invasion of Japan. The Claymont Victory was abreast the White Cliffs of Dover in the English Channel when the announcement of the Japanese surrender on VJ Day, August 15, was broadcast to all aboard. The transport was then re-routed to the United States, and arrived at Boston Port of Embarkation on August 28.
- 1269th Engineer Combat Battalion, August 1945.

=== Post-war ===
After being briefly laid up in the U.S., SS Claymont Victory was purchased in 1947 by Vereenigde Nederlandsche Scheepvaartmaatschapppij (the United Netherlands Navigation Company) of The Hague and renamed Mariekerk. In 1966 she was sold to Kavo Compañia Naviera S.A. of Greece, and registered in Monrovia as Kavo Longos. In 1971 she was scrapped at Whampoa Dock, Hong Kong.

== See also ==
- SS Maritime Victory, a similar VC2-S-AP2 Victory ship conversion into a dedicated troopship
- SS American Victory, a similar VC2-S-AP2 vessel preserved as a museum ship
