= T-Force =

Operational arm of a joint US Army–British Army during the second world war

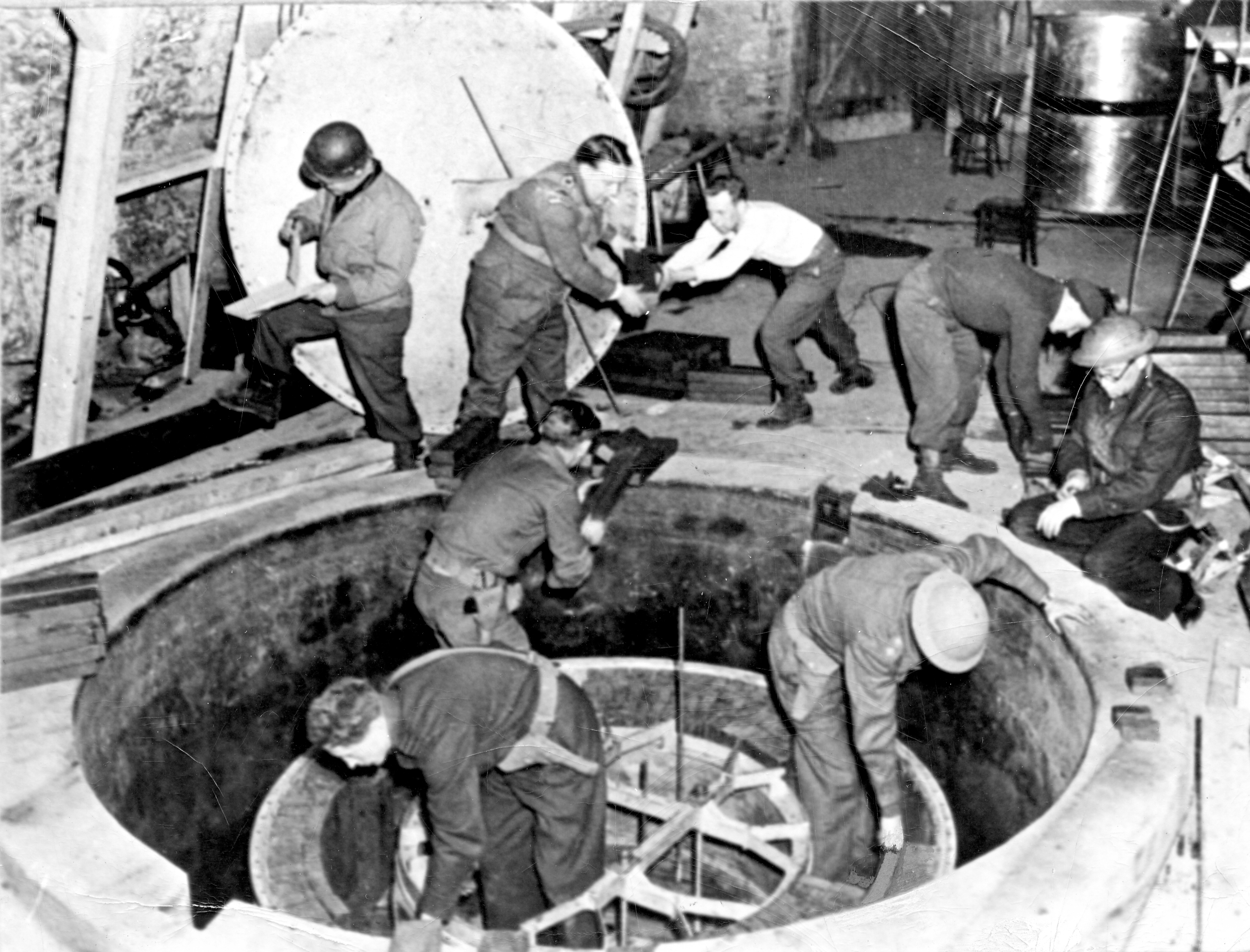
British and American members of T-Force's Alsos Mission dismantle the experimental nuclear reactor that German scientists had built as part of the German nuclear energy project seized during Operation Big

T-Force was the operational arm of a joint US Army–British Army mission to secure German scientific and industrial technology before it could be destroyed by retreating German forces or looters during the final stages of the Second World War and its aftermath. Key personnel were also to be seized and targets of opportunity exploited when encountered. The effort was a business and technology-oriented parallel of sorts to the Monuments Men pursuit of art and financial treasure.

The program was designed to loot German intellectual assets and impede its ability to compete in the postwar political and economic spheres while giving a boost to the nations conducting it. Though unacknowledged at the time, the T-Force mission also included preventing advanced Nazi technology from falling into the hands of the Soviet Union—destroying whatever could not be seized and spirited away before Red Army troops arrived. T-Force activities can be seen as foreshadowing the beginning of the Cold War. Operations in Germany were often heavy-handed and sometimes amounted to kidnapping. Publicly available information on the unit's activities remains scarce.

Comprising some 3,000 "investigators" plus thousands more in attached battalions of infantry and combat engineers, T-Force activities were among the largest Allied "exploitation operations". T-Force was also to prevent damage to infrastructure such as telephone exchanges that would be useful to occupying forces and in the rebuilding of Germany.

== Background ==
T-Force was established in connection with the Operation Overlord Allied invasion of Europe.

During the planning for the invasion SHAEF set up the T (Target) Sub-Division in G-2 to plan for intelligence exploitation of scientific and industrial targets. It was at first composed of five US and three British officers and thirteen enlisted men and women. In February 1945, on the eve of the advance into Germany, SHAEF created the Special Sections Subdivision to co-ordinate the operations of the T Subdivision and several other G-2 sections and subdivisions with related missions. T Subdivision, meanwhile, had acquired a field element, the 6800 T Force, which would reach a 1,700-man strength in April and, with the later addition of the GOLDCUP ministerial control parties, went well over 2,000. During May and June, the force put another 1,000 investigators into the field.

T-Forces were ordered to "identify, secure, guard and exploit valuable and special information, including documents, equipment and persons of value to the Allied armies". T-Force units were attached to the three army groups on the Western Front; the Sixth United States Army Group, 12th US Army Group and the Commonwealth 21st Army Group. The targets of the T-Force were selected and recommended by the Combined Intelligence Objectives Subcommittee (CIOS). T-Force units were lightly armed and highly mobile. British troops included two companies of the 1st Buckinghamshire Battalion, a territorial army battalion of the Oxfordshire and Buckinghamshire Light Infantry, along with the 5th Battalion King's Regiment (Liverpool). American units comprised infantry and combat engineers, including the 1269th Engineer Combat Battalion.

== Operations ==
The Alsos Mission was to seize elements of the German nuclear energy project in south-western Germany towards the end of the war. A subcritical experimental nuclear reactor, uranium ingots, heavy water and several dozen atomic scientists and their staffs were seized, including Werner Heisenberg.

T-Force units accompanied combat units when capturing industrial plants or arrived soon afterward to take control of them. They had to prevent any looting or sabotaging in the plants and were responsible for ensuring that key personnel did not escape and no documents were removed. Once the T-Force took control of a plant, CIOS would be informed of it, and investigators were sent there immediately. In practice, their methods were heavy-handed, "Their methods had echoes of the Gestapo: kidnapping at night by state officials who offered no evidence of identity". What could not be carried off was destroyed. An unknown number of victims were taken in the waning weeks of the war; the British estimated that there were 1,500 Germans who could potentially be targets of these abduction operations, with a third of those number residing in the British zone of occupation.

On 5 May 1945, to deny the Soviet Union a warm-water port, a T-Force unit went into territory designated for conquest by the Red Army and seized Kiel. By that time, in accordance with the terms of the German surrender at Lüneburg Heath, Allied troops had been ordered not to move north past Bad Segeberg but the T-Force group, led by Major Tony Hibbert, was given permission to advance to Kiel and seize the targets there. At odds with the stand-fast order given British troops, the T-Force moved into the city unopposed and took control. A strong German force present in the city was unaware of the Lüneburg Heath surrender and reluctant to stand down when asked by the T-Force, until Admiral Karl Dönitz instructed them to do so. Aggressive actions such as Hibbert's on behalf of T-Force and the bombing of the Auergesellschaft atomic materials processing plant in Oranienburg can be seen to foreshadow the Cold War, which together with the scope and nature of how operations were carried out account for the scarcity of publicly available information on its role.

== Aftermath ==
In postwar Germany, T-Force kidnapped German scientists and businessmen. It has been alleged that German businessmen were forced to travel to post-war Britain to be questioned by their commercial rivals, being interned if they refused to reveal trade secrets. Such abductions helped cripple the German recovery and enabled Britain to use German technological knowledge in building up the British economy after the war and to deny it to the Soviets. Courtaulds received the latest information on man-made fibres, Dorman Long benefited from information and equipment originating from the Hermann Goering Steel Works and even the British coal industry had pit props sent to them from the Harz Mountains. On the military side much information was gathered which could have been vital had the war in the Far East not ended so soon.

There were wider political and economic implications, including the significance of the early liberation of Kiel, which prevented the Russians from adding Schleswig-Holstein and the Jutland Peninsula to their area of influence, as indeed they temporarily did with the Danish island of Bornholm. The unit's role remained secret, only coming to wider notice with the publication of Sean Longden's book T Force, the Race for Nazi War Secrets, 1945 in September 2010.

The post-war French war crimes trials concentrated on French native collaborators. The records of the Militärbefehlshaber Frankreich (MBF) were necessary for the prosecution. The captured records were the results of the work of British and American T-Force document hunters. The French had not prepared for this task and had to work with the British and American forces for the trials. "Yet whereas the British and Americans entered the Reich well-prepared for the document hunt—Supreme Headquarters Allied Expeditionary Forces (SHAEF) had assigned special Target Forces—the French could not keep pace. Thus, the most prominent military and political records, including parts of the MBF, found their way to document centers under Anglo-American jurisdiction".

Many of the operations of the T-Force units were turned over to the Field Information Agency; Technical (FIAT). In its charter, issued at the end of May 1945, FIAT was authorized to "coordinate, integrate, and direct the activities of the various missions and agencies" interested in scientific and technical intelligence, but prohibited from collecting and exploiting such information.

== In popular culture ==
T-Force featured prominently in the plot of the 2016 British TV miniseries Close to the Enemy and in a subplot of the 2016 novel Moonglow by Michael Chabon.

== See also ==
- Operation Paperclip
