= SS Samuel Ashe =

World War II Liberty ship of the United States

History

United States
- Name: Samuel Ashe
- Namesake: Samuel Ashe
- Owner: War Shipping Administration (WSA)
- Operator: American South African Line, Inc.
- Ordered: as a Type EC2-S-C1 hull, MCE hull 164
- Builder: North Carolina Shipbuilding Company, Wilmington, North Carolina
- Cost: $861,000
- Yard number: 20
- Way number: 2
- Laid down: 12 July 1942
- Launched: 17 September 1942
- Sponsored by: Miss Shirley Jean Beasley
- Completed: 16 October 1943
- Identification: Call sign: KFOP
- Fate: Laid up in the, James River Reserve Fleet, Jones Point, New York, 6 January 1948; Laid up in the, Hudson River Reserve Fleet, Jones Point, New York, 23 May 1953; Sold for scrapping, 27 May 1968, withdrawn from fleet, 30 June 1969

General characteristics
- Class & type: Liberty ship; type EC2-S-C1, standard
- Tonnage: 10,865 LT DWT; 7,176 GRT
- Displacement: 3,380 long tons (3,434 t) (light); 14,245 long tons (14,474 t) (max)
- Length: 441 feet 6 inches (135 m) oa; 416 feet (127 m) pp; 427 feet (130 m) lwl
- Beam: 57 feet (17 m)
- Draft: 27 ft 9.25 in (8.4646 m)
- Installed power: 2 × Oil fired 450 °F (232 °C) boilers, operating at 220 psi (1,500 kPa); 2,500 hp (1,900 kW)
- Propulsion: 1 × triple-expansion steam engine, (manufactured by General Machinery Corp., Hamilton, Ohio); 1 × screw propeller
- Speed: 11.5 knots (21.3 km/h; 13.2 mph)
- Capacity: 562,608 cubic feet (15,931 m^{3}) (grain); 499,573 cubic feet (14,146 m^{3}) (bale)
- Complement: 38–62 USMM; 21–40 USNAG
- Armament: Varied by ship; Bow-mounted 3-inch (76 mm)/50-caliber gun; Stern-mounted 4-inch (102 mm)/50-caliber gun; 2–8 × single 20-millimeter (0.79 in) Oerlikon anti-aircraft (AA) cannons and/or, 2–8 × 37-millimeter (1.46 in) M1 AA guns

SS Samuel Ashe was a Liberty ship built in the United States during World War II. She was named after Samuel Ashe the ninth Governor of the US state of North Carolina from 1795 to 1798. He was also one of the first three judges of the North Carolina Superior Court in 1787.

== Construction ==
Samuel Ashe was laid down 17 July 1942, under a Maritime Commission (MARCOM) contract, MC hull 164, by the North Carolina Shipbuilding Company, Wilmington, North Carolina: she was launched 17 September 1942, sponsored by Miss Shirley Jean Beasley, the daughter of E.O. Beasley, the foreman of welders at NCSB.

== History ==
She was allocated to American South African Line, Inc., on 29 September 1942. Among her missions was repatriating part of the US 1269th Engineer Combat Battalion stateside from Antwerp in August 1945.

On 6 January 1948, she was laid up in the James River Reserve Fleet, Jones Point, New York. She was laid up in the, Hudson River Reserve Fleet, Jones Point, New York, 23 May 1953.

On 11 June 1953, she was withdrawn from the fleet to be loaded with grain under the "Grain Program 1953", she returned loaded with grain on 25 June 1953. She was withdrawn from the fleet on 2 July 1956, to have the grain unloaded, she returned reloaded on 24 July 1956. On 3 January 1958, she was withdrawn from the fleet to be unloaded, she returned empty on 13 January 1958. She was withdrawn from the fleet on 8 September 1958, to be loaded with grain, she returned loaded with grain on 17 September 1958. She was withdrawn from the fleet on 22 December 1959, to have the grain unloaded, she returned empty on 30 December 1959. She was withdrawn from the fleet on 10 October 1960, to be loaded with grain, she returned loaded with grain on 29 October 1960. She was withdrawn from the fleet on 12 April 1960, to have the grain unloaded, she returned empty on 20 April 1963.

She was sold for scrapping, on 27 May 1968, to Northern Metals Co. She was removed from the fleet on 30 June 1969.

== Bibliography ==
- "North Carolina Shipbuilding, Wilmington NC". ShipbuildingHistory.com. 16 October 2010.
- Maritime Administration. "Samuel Ashe". Ship History Database Vessel Status Card. U.S. Department of Transportation, Maritime Administration.
- Davies, James (May 2004). "Specifications (As-Built)" (PDF). p. 23.
- "SS Samuel Ashe".
- Allison, William H. "1269th Engineer Combat Battalion: An Outline of its History". Archived from the original on 5 March 2016.
