= Sean Longden =

English author (b.1965)

Sean Longden (born 1965 in Clapham, Bedfordshire, England) is an author and historian who specialises in British social history during World War II, his work extensively uses oral history interviews and first person accounts. He was educated at Sharnbrook Upper School and The School of Slavonic and East European Studies (SSEES), University College London.

== Bibliography ==
- To the Victor the Spoils (Arris Books, 2004).

A social history of the British Army between D-Day and VE Day includes stories about the sex life, crime and fashion of soldiers in the British Army.

- Hitler's British Slaves (Arris Books, 2006).

This book deals with the brutal treatment of British POWs who worked in German agriculture and industry during World War Two. The book overturns the "Great Escape Myth" that most prisoners lived in POW camps which were a cross between a harsh boarding school and a holiday camp.

- Dunkirk, The Men They Left Behind (Constable Robinson, 2008).

A history of the 40,000 soldiers of the British Expeditionary Force who were left behind following the evacuation of the BEF from the port of Dunkirk in France in 1940.

- T-Force: The Race for Nazi War Secrets, 1945 (Hachette UK, 2009 ISBN 9781849012478).

The first history of the World War II British Army unit Target Forces, also known as T-Force, that was created in 1945 to search for German military researchers and scientists. T-Force's creation was inspired by the work of Ian Fleming who had previously helped to found the Royal Marine unit 30AU, which did similar work in France in 1944.

- Blitz Kids: The Children's War Against Hitler (Hachette UK, 2012 ISBN 9781849018272).

A history of the experience of English children during World War II, this book includes accounts of evacuation, blackout, rationing and air raids.
