= 1269th Engineer Combat Battalion (United States) =

- Insignia of the U.S. Army Corps of Engineers
- Active: 1943–46
- Country: United States
- Allegiance: United States Army
- Branch: Regular Army; Corps of Engineers
- Type: Combat Engineer
- Size: Battalion of Companies A, B, C and H&S
- Engagements: World War II (Rhineland Campaign, Central Europe Campaign)

Commanders
- Notable commanders: Lt. Col. Willard White

The 1269th Engineer Combat Battalion was an engineer combat battalion that served in the United States Army in the European Theater of Operations during World War II. It saw action in France and Germany, serving notably with the Army's T-Force intelligence assault force in the capture of German atomic weapons facilities and personnel as part of Operation Big.

== History ==
=== Formation ===
The 1269th Engineer Combat Battalion was activated at Camp Chaffee, Arkansas on 30 March 1944. A senior cadre was organized under the command of Major Willard White. In April a core unit of 18-year-old ASTP volunteers and Army Air Corps trainees arrived for five months of combat engineer basic training. Many of that group were promoted to round out NCO cadre vacancies, after which replacements were brought in to fill the unit to T/O strength. The battalion moved by train to Camp Kilmer, New Jersey, arriving 18 October 1944.

=== In the ETO ===
==== France ====
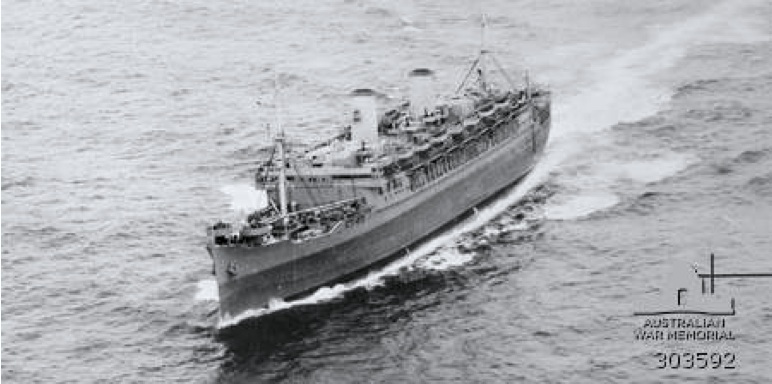
A converted luxury liner, the SS Mariposa was a very large troopship, fast enough to elude U-boats unescorted across the Atlantic

The battalion departed New York POE on 27 October and crossed the Atlantic unescorted aboard the converted luxury liner SS Mariposa, docking in Marseille, France, on 6 November 1944. The unit marched to a staging area near Aix-en-Provence for three weeks of advanced training, mainly in demolitions, while waiting for equipment and vehicles. While there it was attached to the U.S. Seventh Army of the U.S. Sixth Army Group in the European Theater of Operations.

On 29 November the battalion motor convoyed to Nice, France. From 30 November 1944 to 23 March 1945 it was attached to the 44th AAA Brigade, in support of the famed Japanese-American 442nd Regimental Combat Team, and later the Puerto Rican 65th Infantry Regiment on combat duty in the Maritime Alps, on the southern Maginot Line above Nice and Menton. While there the 3rd platoon of Company A built a timber trestle bridge under fire, naming it in honor of Pfc. George I. Bernay, the first among the unit to be killed in action (7 December 1944).

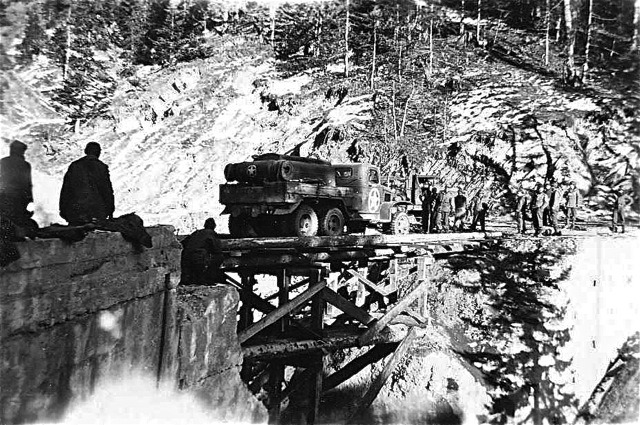
Timber trestle constructed in the Maritime Alps in the winter of 1944-45

Company A line platoons were located at Peira Cava, St. Martin Vesubie, and La Bollene—engaged in minefield work, demolitions, bridge building, road work, patrol activities and other combat engineer assignments, confronting the enemy-held forts Mille Fourches and La Forca, on the Alpine heights of l'Authion above the Turini forest. HQ units were in Nice and St. Martin-du-Var. Early in March 1945 Company A units were pulled back to duty on the Côte d'Azur, guarding key points on the shore between Nice and Menton.

Company B units were in Menton and Sospel and Company C was at Nice and l'Escarene. Battalion HQ was located at Beaulieu-sur-Mer.

On 18 March 1945 the battalion began the move from Southern France to Germany, going by way of Montelimar, Lyon, Dijon, Rosieres-aux-Salines, and Sarreguemines, France.

==== Germany ====
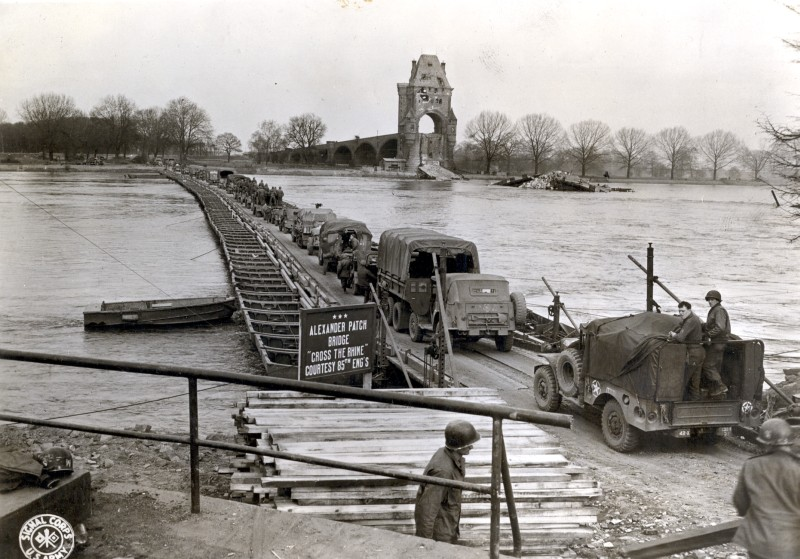
Battalion crossing Rhine near Worms, Germany 29 March 1945. Trucks and men of Company C are nearest in view.

The battalion reached the battle front at Frankenthal, Germany, on 23 March 1945. Operating under the command of the 6th Army Group T-Force intelligence assault force, the 1269th advanced to the Rhine River at Ludwigshafen on 24 March. Under a heavy artillery barrage it seized and held T-Force targets there, including the I. G. Farben factory. At 08:00 on 29 March the battalion decamped, crossed the Rhine on a pontoon bridge near Worms, and advanced to T-Force targets in Mannheim. In the weeks thereafter the battalion moved with the battle front, rushing forward with assault forces to secure vital intelligence targets with their records, equipment, and personnel intact. Heidelberg, an open city, was entered on 1 April—the Kaiser Wilhelm Institute being a main target there. Würzburg followed on 10 April, then Heilbronn the 16th, and on 22 April the column brushed the outskirts of Stuttgart, heading for the Black Forest.

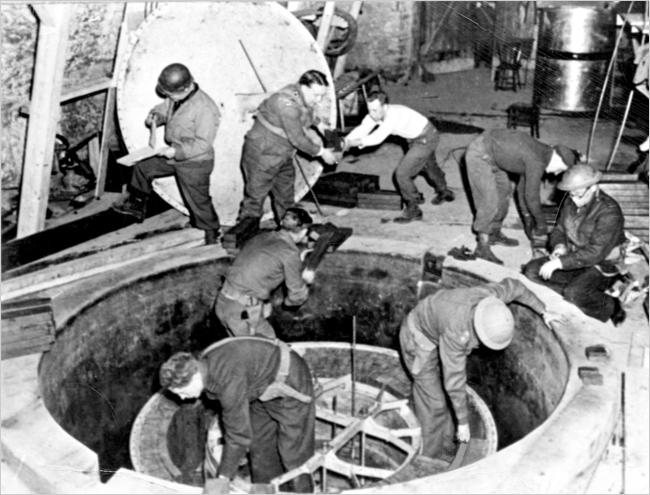
T-Force 1269th engineers dismantle the nuclear pile that German scientists had built up under the Uranprojekt program in Haigerloch, April 1945

The 1269th was now functioning as the combat arm of the Alsos Mission, a military Intelligence assault force commanded by Colonel Boris Pash directed against the Nazi atomic weaponry program. In the final rush to seize the atomic research center at Haigerloch, Alsos and the 1269th ECB, less Company B, crossed through the French First Army's spearhead column en route to Sigmaringen and Stuttgart (contrary to Sixth Army Group command).

On 22 April at Haigerloch, and for six days thereafter in the towns of Hechingen, Bisingen, Tailfingen (today part of Albstadt), and Thanheim, the 1269th ECB participated in taking atomic scientists into custody, seizing laboratory records and equipment, and securing uranium, heavy water, and other items and materials important to the U.S./British Manhattan Project.

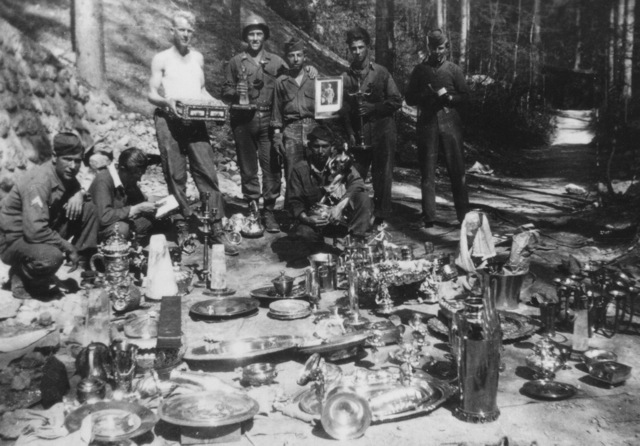
Members of Company A display treasure from stash unearthed below Reichsmarschall Hermann Göring's chalet in Berchtesgaden

Leaving the Alsos Mission on 28 April, the battalion became one of the first combat units to enter Munich, advancing with Company C, 30th Regiment of the 3rd Infantry Division. Elements of the battalion were among the first troops to come upon the concentration camp at Dachau.

In Munich the 1269th was responsible for exploiting and guarding T-Force targets, disarming mines and booby traps, and other combat engineer duties.

Units of Company A were sent to Berchtesgaden in support of the 101st Airborne Division on 5 May and thereafter, to exploit intelligence targets in that area. While there it played an important role in uncovering art treasures hidden in a cave near Reichsmarschall Hermann Göring's home.

The unit's commander, Lieutenant Colonel Willard White returned to Austin, Texas after the war. In August, 1945 he hosted a dinner party that featured table linens and over one hundred pieces of silverware looted from the site. White has been called the "a strong candidate for the top souvenir collector at Berchtesgaden." Later in life, he sold his collection.

===== Occupation duty =====
The battalion's work in Munich and the pre-Alpine region completed, the 1269th began a series of moves westward. On 14 May, H&S and C Companies moved to Augsburg to open a camp for some 250 to 300 special T-Force investigators. Company A moved from Munich to Bad Rappenau on 16 June. Company C moved to Neckargemund on 10 July. On 13 July, H&S Company and the Medical Detachment moved to Heidelberg. B Company was instrumental in collecting data used in the 1946 Nuremberg trials. On 16 June that company moved to Heinsheim, then to Waibstadt on the 19th.

Changes of location and assignments continued, with Company A moving from Bad Rappenau to St. Ilgen on 15 July.

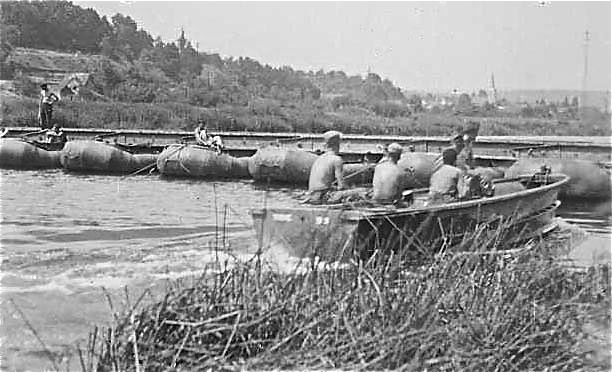
Treadway bridge built over the Neckar River near Heidelberg as a training assignment in preparation for planned deployment to the Pacific Theater for the invasion of Japan

The battalion was ordered to work with a German contractor charged with building a bridge across the Neckar river at Heidelberg. Company A spent three days, beginning 27 July, crossing the Neckar with a Treadway bridge and then dismantling it, to fulfill that Seventh Army assignment. On 31 July Company A moved from St. Ilgen to Seckenheim.

On 3 August, the 1269th ECB was relieved from attachment to the Seventh Army T-Force, under orders that the battalion be depleted and its personnel transferred to the 3rd Reinforcement Depot, near Marburg.

On 4 August, B Company personnel were transferred to the 3rd Reinforcement Depot, except for the company CP, which moved to Heidelberg. On 5 August, A and C Companies followed suit. Then on 6 August, the battalion HQ and H&S Company CP, plus some other personnel, were transferred to the Reinforcement Depot.

==== Repatriation ====
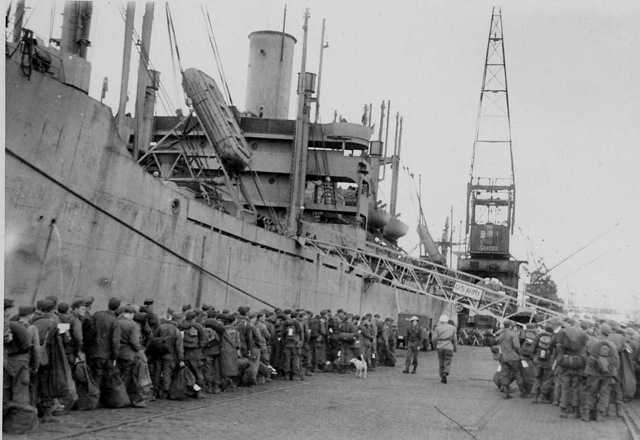
Battalion troops boarding SS Claymont Victory transport at Antwerp Dock for return stateside

Most of Company A troops were moved by train in 40 & 8 boxcars dating from the 1st World War from 14 through 16 August to Camp Tophat near Antwerp, by way of Kassel, Maastricht, and Liege. Other companies of the 1269th made a similar trip at about the same time.

Most of Company A sailed from Antwerp on 19 August aboard the SS NYU Victory, reaching New York Harbor on 29 August. From there, a ferry boat took the troops up the Hudson river to Camp Shanks, where they were welcomed with a lavish feast, then swiftly sent home on furloughs.

Other battalion members sailed from Antwerp in August 1945 as conditions permitted on various ships, including the SS Samuel Ashe, SS Mariposa, and SS Claymont Victory.

=== Deactivation ===
The battalion remnant was deactivated at Camp Kilmer, New Jersey, on 2 March 1946.

== Campaign credit ==
- Rhineland
- Central Europe

== See also ==
- Operation Alsos
