= Operation Big =

Allied scientific intelligence operation during World War II

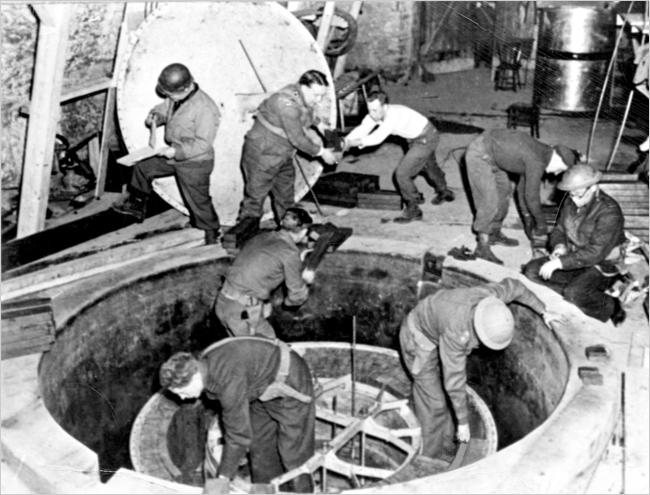
U.S. and British engineers dismantle the nuclear pile that German scientists had built up under the Uranprojekt program in Haigerloch in April 1945

Operation Big was an operation of the Alsos Mission, the Allied seizure of facilities, materiel, and personnel related to the German nuclear weapon project during World War II. (Note: There appears to be some overlap or confusion with Operation Harborage, as the same cities are targeted and same basic narratives attached) It was tasked with sweeping several targeted towns in the area of southwest Germany designated to the French First Army, including Hechingen, Bisingen, Haigerloch, and Tailfingen.

Operating behind German lines the U.S. task force successfully carried out its mission of seizing or destroying all project related assets and capturing its top scientists in the last week of April and first week of May, 1945.

== History ==
Shortly after the liberation of Paris it was decided to bomb German nuclear facilities wherever they lay in order to deprive the Soviet Union of their technology and personnel, unless American troops could get to them first. Worried that French forces might beat the US to Werner Heisenberg's laboratory in Hechingen, Alsos chief Lt-Col Boris Pash hastily organized a flying column of combat engineers from the 1269th Engineer Combat Battalion, the U.S. Sixth Army Group's T-Force intelligence assault force ("Task Force A"). His team reached Horb three days later and headed for Haigerloch while the French forward troops occupied themselves with looking for members of the Vichy Government twenty miles deeper into Württemberg in the Sigmaringen enclave.

Pash and his engineers, accompanied by the Sixth Army Group's Chief of Intelligence, General Eugene Harrison, overran Haigerloch on 23 April 1945.

Here the elated scientists made their first big discovery. As the engineer troops consolidated the group’s position in the town, the ALSOS team shot open a bolted door sealing the entrance to a cave in the side of a cliff. Inside, the team found a large chamber and several smaller rooms crammed with instruments, control boxes, and an array of cylinders described by a frightened German technician as a uranium machine. Though missing its uranium element, the device was an operating atomic pile, captured undamaged.

With help from engineers, the scientists spent two days dismantling the equipment. Three large drums of heavy water, used to control the reaction in the pile, were later found in the laboratory's main chamber and a German scientist told Pash that the reactor's uranium cubes had been concealed beneath hay in a nearby barn. (Note: Note there are detailed alternative accounts of what and whom was found where, including: Beck, Alfred M, et al, United States Army in World War II: The Technical Services – The Corps of Engineers: The War Against Germany, 1985 Chapter 24, Into the Heart of Germany, p. 556-559 and Atomic Heritage Foundation:The Alsos Mission)

The task force then proceeded to Hechingen where they found and detained Erich Bagge, Carl Friedrich von Weizsäcker, Max von Laue, and Karl Wirtz, then went on to Tailfingen (today part of Albstadt) where they arrested Otto Hahn. Heisenberg, who had left Hechingen on 19 April, was captured by Pash and a small force at his home in Urfeld am Walchensee, on 3 May 1945.

== See also ==
- Operation Harborage
- Operation Epsilon

== Notes ==
Footnotes
