= Zeller Horn =

Mountain in Baden-Württemberg, Germany

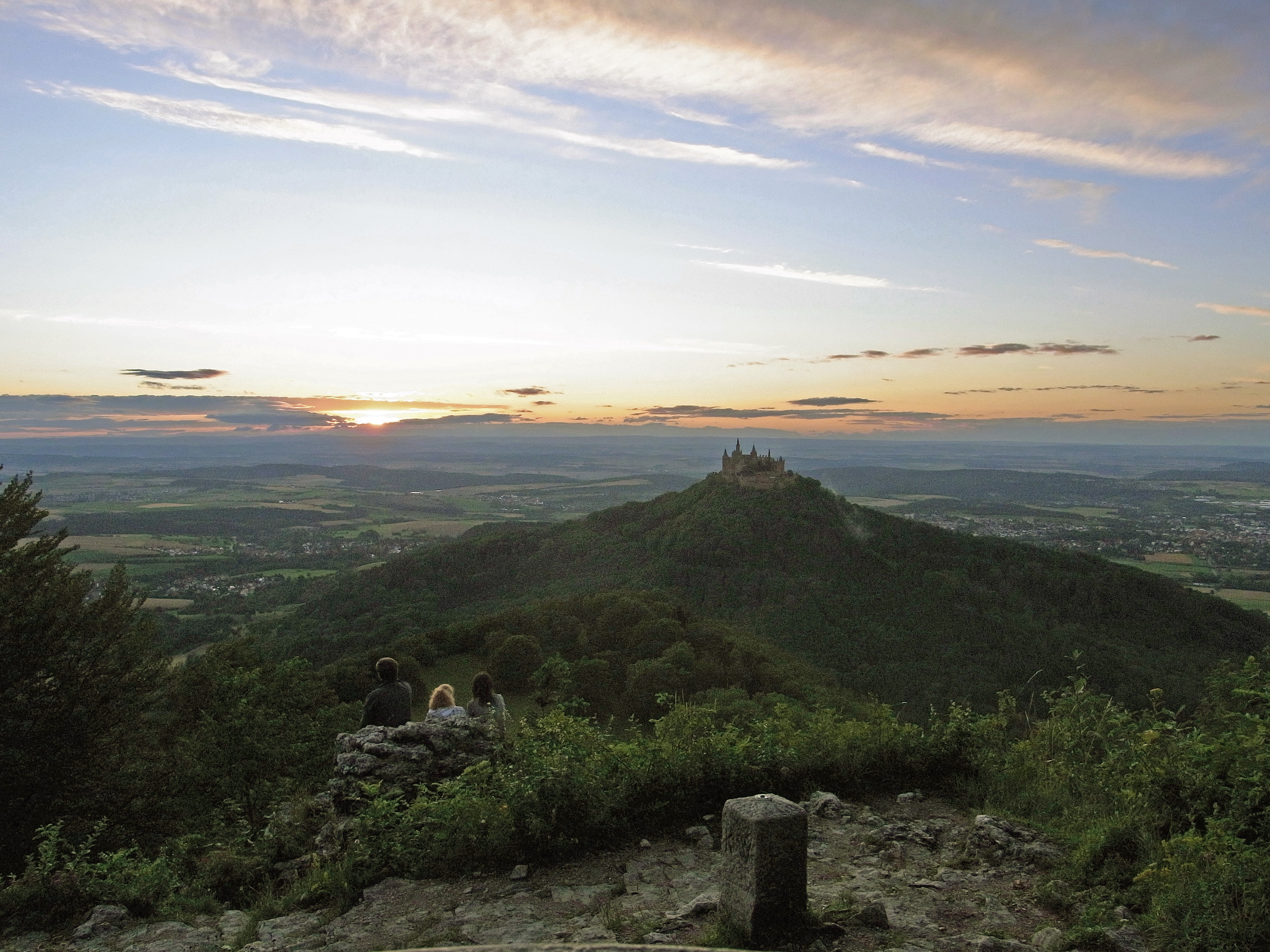

Highest point
- Elevation: 913 m (2,995 ft)
- Coordinates: 48°19′N 8°59′E

Geography
- Location within Germany
- Location: Albstadt, Zollernalbkreis, Baden-Württemberg, Germany
- Parent range: Swabian Jura

Zeller Horn is a mountain of Baden-Württemberg, Germany. It is located in Albstadt, Zollernalbkreis.

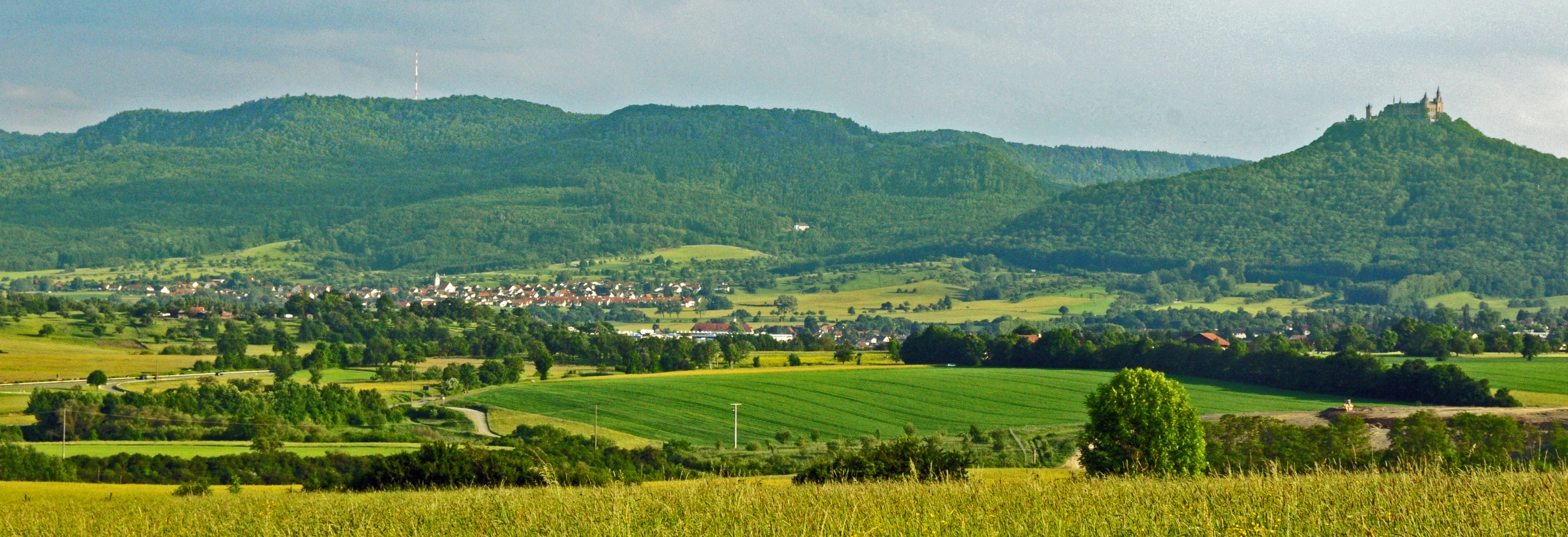
The "Albtrauf" near Hechingen with Zeller Horn in the center, right hand side Hohenzollern Castle
