= Hundsrücken (Swabian Jura) =

Mountain in Baden-Württemberg, Germany

- Location within Baden-Württemberg

Highest point
- Elevation: 931 m (3,054 ft)
- Coordinates: 48°16′49″N 08°55′45″E

Geography
- Location: Zollernalbkreis, Baden-Württemberg, Germany

The Hundsrücken is a mountain in Baden-Württemberg, Germany. It is located in the county of Zollernalbkreis.
