= Bisingen =

German municipality

- Municipality
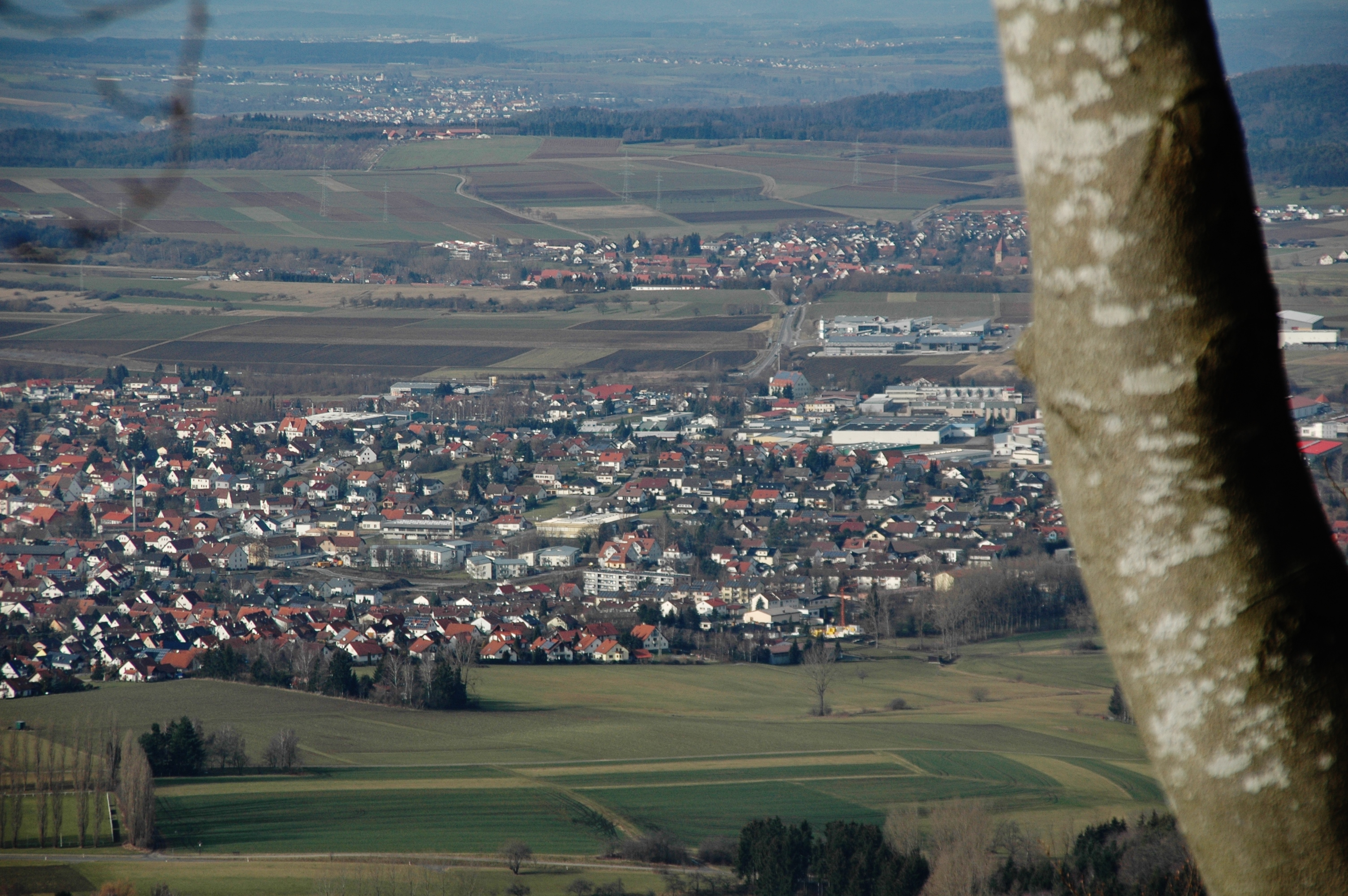
- Bisingen seen from the east

- Coat of arms

- Location of Bisingen within Zollernalbkreis district
- Interactive map of Bisingen
- Location within Germany Location within Baden-Württemberg
- Coordinates: 48°18′43″N 08°55′04″E
- Country: Germany
- State: Baden-Württemberg
- Admin. region: Tübingen
- District: Zollernalbkreis

Government
  - Mayor (2021–29): Roman Waizenegger (CDU)

Area
  - Total: 32.83 km^{2} (12.68 sq mi)
- Elevation: 561 m (1,841 ft)

Population (2025-12-31)
  - Total: 9,423
  - Density: 287.0/km^{2} (743.4/sq mi)
- Time zone: UTC+01:00 (CET)
  - Summer (DST): UTC+02:00 (CEST)
- Postal codes: 72406
- Dialling codes: 07476
- Vehicle registration: BL
- Website: www.gemeinde-bisingen.de

Bisingen (German pronunciation: [ˈbiːzɪŋən]) is a municipality in the Zollernalbkreis district of Baden-Württemberg, Germany.

== History ==
Bisingen is one of the oldest settlements of the area, verified by several findings of the Neolithic Age, the Bronze Age, the early Iron Age and the La Téne time period. The founding of Bisingen and Wessingen is ascribed to the Alemanni around 300 A.D., and Steinhofen, Thanheim & Zimmern being founded around 500 A.D. The first recorded mention of Bisingen and Wessingen was in 786 A.D.: the Franconian Count Gerold in der Baar gifted goods from Pisinguin (Bisingen) and Uassingun (Wessingen) to the St. Gallen monastery.

The towns of Bisingen, Thanheim, Wessingen, and Zimmern were part of Oberamt Hechingen, a district of the Principality of Hohenzollern-Hechingen and, from 1850, the Kingdom of Prussia. The Oberamt was dissolved in 1925 and mixed with Oberamt Haigerloch into the new Landkreis Hechingen. Over the 1930s, the population of Romani that had grown up in Steinhof to escape persecution in Württemberg was, despite the efforts of local lawyer Julius Klink, expelled. During the later part of World War II, from August 1944 to March 1945, a forced labor camp operated at Bisingen. After the war, Bisingen began expanding dramatically. The town itself grew until the 1970s to the north and east, and politically over the same decade with the merging of Wessingen and Zimmern into Bisingen in 1972, followed by Thanheim in 1974. When Baden-Württemberg reformed its districts in 1973, Hechingen's district was as a consequence dissolved, and Bisingen was assigned to the new Zollernalb district. Bisingen's industrial capacity began expanding in the 1980s, and this growth continued well into the 1990s.

== Geography ==
Bisingen is physically located along the northern edge of the Swabian Jura, between the Hundsrücken and the Hohenzollern mountains. Elevation above sea level in the municipal area ranges from a low of 485 meters (1,591 ft) Normalnull (NN) on the Klingenbach to a high of 912 meters (2,992 ft) NN at the top of the Zeller Horn.

Portions of the Federally-protected Hohegert, Irrenberg-Hundsrücken, and Zollerhalde nature reserves are located in Bisingen.

=== Political geography ===
The municipality (Gemeinde) of Bisingen covers 32.84 square kilometers (12.68 sq mi) of the Zollernalb district of Baden-Württemberg, a state of the Federal Republic of Germany.

The abandoned villages of Hofen and Weiler are located within Bisingen. Weiler was first mentioned in 1328 as "Wiler hinter Zollern" and vanished by the 15th century; it likely belonged to the Maria Zell pilgrimage church.

== Coat of arms ==
Bisingen's municipal coat of arms is divided party per pale into a red field on the left and a yellow one on the right. Inside the red portion is a yellow miter while in the yellow half is half of a red gear wheel. These are, respectively, references to the Lords of Bisingen and to Bisingen's industry. This pattern was first approved by the provisional government of Württemberg-Hohenzollern on 14 September 1953. The Zollernalb district office reapproved the pattern for municipal use on 30 June 1982.

== Transportation ==
Bisingen is connected to Germany's network of highways by Bundesstraße 27 and to its railways by the Tübingen–Sigmaringen railway. Public transport is provided by the Verkehrsverbund Neckar-Alb-Donau.
