= Field Information Agency, Technical =

American Army agency (1945-47)

The Field Information Agency, Technical (FIAT) was a US Army agency for securing the "major, and perhaps only, material reward of victory, namely, the advancement of science and the improvement of production and standards of living in the United Nations, by proper exploitation of German methods in these fields"; FIAT ended in 1947, when Operation Paperclip began functioning.

The United States organization was designated FIAT (Field Investigation Agency-Technical). FIAT continued TIIC's work, combing the mountains of papers found in factories and hideaways, to ferret out the scientific secrets, the mechanical devices, and the special techniques developed by the Germans in the decades following World War I. Important papers, documented wherever possible by observations, drawings and photographs, were flown back to Washington."

== Organization ==
Early in 1945, foreseeing a vastly increased military and civilian interest after hostilities ended in Germany, Secretary of War Stimson had sent his scientific consultant, E. L. Bowles, to Europe to help set up a single high-level scientific and technological intelligence organization. Later, in April, among his other assignments, General Clay had acquired the job of working with Bowles in carrying out the mission from the Secretary of War. Since the new organization would have to be combined for as long as SHAEF existed, Clay had selected as its chief Brig. R. J. Maunsell (British), who was already chief of the Special Sections Subdivision, and as the deputy chief Col. Ralph M. Osborne (US). Clay also gave the organization a name, Field Information Agency, to which Maunsell added the word "Technical" to make a pronounceable acronym, FIAT. FIAT was from the first conceived as a post-hostilities agency. It would inherit from the Special Sections Subdivision a military mission and, in the search for information to use against Japan, also a wartime mission; but in the long run it would be oriented at least equally toward civilian interests. Chief among its interests would be "the securing of the major, and perhaps only, material reward of victory, namely, the advancement of science and the improvement of production and standards of living in the United Nations by proper exploitation of German methods in these fields." FIAT's scope was therewith extended to take in scientific and industrial processes and patents having civilian as well as military applications. Although Clay, Bowles, and Maunsell envisioned FIAT as having exclusive "control and actual handling of operations concerning enemy personnel, documents, and equipment of scientific and industrial interest," they discovered before long that to set up an agency with such sweeping authority in the bureaucratic thickets of SHAEF was not possible. Direct control of operations was already in the hands of various long-established SHAEF elements and would remain there-except for Operation DUSTBIN, which came under FIAT along with its parent agency, the Special Sections Subdivision, on 1 July, and the 6800 T Force, which by the time it passed to FIAT (on 1 August) had practically finished assessing its assigned and uncovered targets. The one new T Force operation in the FIAT period was conducted in Berlin in July and August. In its charter, issued at the end of May, FIAT was authorized to "coordinate, integrate, and direct the activities of the various missions and agencies" interested in scientific and technical intelligence but prohibited from collecting and exploiting such information on its own responsibility.

Never the high-powered intelligence unit Stimson had wanted and, after SHAEF was dissolved, an orphan shared administratively by the US Group Control Council and USFET without being adopted by either, FIAT eventually came by its distinctive role in the occupation almost inadvertently. In the summer of 1945, from its office in Frankfurt and branches in Paris, London, and Berlin, it provided accreditation, support, and services to civilian investigators from the Technical Industrial Intelligence Committee (Foreign Economic Administration) then arriving in Europe in large numbers to comb German plants and laboratories for information on everything from plastics to shipbuilding and building materials to chemicals. As military units that had been engaged in gathering technical intelligence were redeployed beginning in the late summer, FIAT frequently also became the custodian of the documents and equipment they had collected. Meanwhile, in June, President Truman had established the Publications Board under the Director of War Mobilization and Reconversion and instructed it to review all scientific and technical information developed with government funds during the war with a view toward declassifying and publishing it. In August, after V-J Day, the President also ordered "prompt, public and general dissemination" of scientific and industrial information obtained from the enemy and assigned this responsibility as well to the Publication Board. At first informally and later, in December, by War Department order, FIAT acquired the responsibility for the Publication Board program in Germany and a mission, which was the same one in fact that had been foreseen for it in June, namely, to exploit Germany's scientific and industrial secrets for the benefit of the world. As the military intelligence projects were completed and phased out in late 1945 and early 1946, the volume of civilian investigations increased; FIAT microfilming teams ranged across Germany, and the Frankfurt office screened, edited, and translated reports before shipping them to the United States. By the end of the first year of the occupation, FIAT had processed over 23,000 reports, shipped 108 items of equipment (whole plants sometimes were counted as single items), and collected 53 tons of documents.

The earliest Joint Intelligence Objectives search teams were followed by others, which were to dig out industrial and scientific secrets in particular. The Technical Industrial Intelligence Committee was one group of these, composed of three hundred and eighty civilians representing seventeen American industries. Later came the teams of the Office of the Publication Board itself and many mow groups direct from private industry. Of the latter—called, in Germany, Field Intelligence Agencies, Technical (FIAT) – there have been over five hundred; of one to ten members each, operating by invitation and under the aegis of the OPB. Today the search still goes on. The Office of Technical Services has a European staff of four to five hundred J At Hoechst, it has one hundred abstractors who struggle feverishly to keep ahead of the forty OTS document-recording cameras which route to them each month over one hundred thousand feet of microfilm.

Administratively, the story started in 1944, when the Combined Intelligence Objectives Subcommittee (CIOS), was organized in London by authority of the British and American chiefs of staff. The American membership of CIOS was represented by the War, Navy and State Departments, Army Air Forces, Foreign Economic Administration, Office of Strategic Services, and Office of Scientific and Research and Development. It was CIOS who organized the first teams of experts and started them toward predetermined objectives on the European continent. To make the most of the fact-finding thrusts, the Technical Industrial Intelligence Committee (TIIC) was organized in Washington. TIIC was under the joint chiefs of staff, and its job was to help government agencies get needed information as it was collected from the liberated countries. CIOS folded up last July, along with SHAEF, and its functions were largely taken over by Field Information Agency, Technical (FIAT). TIIC, however, was still on the job, getting information from its own investigations from FIAT, and from a scattering of other sources. The TIIC was headed by Howland H. Sargeant, of the US Alien Properties Custodian.

== Results ==
The main result of the FIAT was to make public many of the technical and scientific advances made by the German and Axis government during World War II. Some of the results showed that publications in Germany were hampered, not by lack of talent, but by lack of paper for printing. Max von Laue wrote in April 1948 that the FIAT Reviews indicated what German scientists were doing during the war. He admitted that scientific journal publication lapsed, one after another, toward the end of the war. But this was not from a lack of articles to be published, he asserted. The lapse of publication in science was due mostly to lack of paper, bomb damage to printing houses, and other economic strictures. For example, he cites, the Zeitschrift für Physik, had sixty articles waiting for publication at the end of the war, and they could have accepted 86 more articles.

The scientists at the Kaiser Wilhelm Institutes were world leaders in plant breeding efforts, and sent some of their colleagues out with the army to "acquire" specimens. These scientists were part of the SS Ahnenerbe, which included specialists in race, biologists, physicians, historians, botanists, zoologists, geneticists and plant breeders. Like the ERR, these units had an armed "Sammelkommando" or "Collecting Commando", to secure what was needed in the occupied countries. Near the end of the war, Hitler ordered that this collection be destroyed, but the order was disobeyed. Although Heinz Brűcher cooperated with the Allies at the end of the war, and even wrote some articles for the US Army Field Information Assistance Technical Unit (FIAT), the seed collections remained hidden away until he could retrieve them in 1947, and take them first to Sweden, then to South America.

Many of the German research organizations were temporarily suspended during the Allied occupation of the country. And part of their duties were to inventory the loss of research materials, including books, during the war. A report made by the Field Information Agency, Technical (FIAT) in August 1945 noted that many of the library books were removed to the basements of the University of Heidelberg buildings. These buildings were at that time used for billets for the American troops, and the need to replace the books was evident.

"...A subsequent ACC Law, No. 29, ordered that "any of the four powers in occupation of Germany... may request in writing an authenticated copy of any book, paper, statement, account, writing or other document from the files of any German industrial, business or commercial enterprise." This law enabled the Allies to confiscate virtually every document, regardless of whether it belonged to the state or a private individual. The Americans in particular took advantage of Law No. 29. Branches of the Field Information Agency, Technical, USA (FIAT), processed over 29,000 reports, confiscated 55 tons of documents, and made over 3,400 trips within Germany to investigate the so-called "targets" of interest through June 30, 1946. Considering the transatlantic transportation problems they were already experiencing, the Americans preferred to seize "lightweight" goods, such as documents, as compensation for their participation in World War II. On the other hand, the Soviet Military Administration looked, as previously shown, for machinery and equipment. It is obvious that, at the beginning, they underestimated the value of patents, trademarks and blueprints. They even left behind the library of the Reichspatentamt in Berlin, which the Americans confiscated then when they arrived in mid-1945."

The desired result was to allow Allied businesses and industry to take advantage of Axis research before and during the war, when the isolation of German science had denied the rest of the world the benefits of their research. These published results also helped scientists and researchers in the former Axis countries, who also had been denied access to German research. In an announcement in 1947, the Petroleum Times announces that the CIOS, BIOS and FIAT reports were available for purchase from HM Stationery Office. They also announced that there would be a display of the reports at a number of cities around the country. Also, the BIOS "...has access to a considerable number of site reports on German factories and research establishments, original German documents and miscellaneous items of information which, by their nature, are not suitable for reproduction and publication..."

== Publications ==
- Field Information Agency, Technical. "FIAT Review of German Science, Allied Edition." A series of reports and comprehensive library on the status of German science in various disciplines published after the war, from the time when Nazi control of information cut off the flow of scientific publications. Copies of the FIAT Review are still available from NTIS.
- Bartels, Julius (1899–1964), [and others], 1948, Geophysics. [n.p.] Office of the Military Government for Germany, Field Information Agencies Technical, British, French, U.S., 1948. 2 volumes, illustrations, maps (part fold.); 23 cm. Series: FIAT review of German science, 1939–1946. Notes: Text in German. Includes bibliographies. OCLC: 04286518.
- Eppler, W. F., 1947, Bearing jewels of hardened synthetic spinel. [n.p.] Field Information Agency, Technical [1947] 40 pages including 9 tables; 27 cm. Notes: At head of title: Office of Military Government for Germany (US) ... OCLC: 12367985.
- Josephson, G. W., 1946, Kyanite and synthetic sillimanite in Germany. [S.l.]: Office of Military Government for Germany (US), Field Information Agency, Technical, 1946. 13 pages; 27 cm. Series: FIAT final report; no. 803. Notes: "26. April, 1946." Added Entry: Germany (Territory under Allied occupation, 1945–1955 : U.S. Zone). Office of Military Government. Field Information Agency, Technical. OCLC: 27926539.
- Merker, Leon, 1947, The synthetic stone industry of Germany. [n.p.] Field Information Agency, Technical [1947] 24 pages; 27 cm. Notes: At head of title: Office of military government for Germany (US). OCLC: 12364098.
- Mügge, Ratje (1896– ), et al., 1948, Meteorology and physics of the atmosphere. [n.p.] Off. of Military Govt. for Germany, Field Information Agencies Technical, British, French, U.S., 1948. 291 pages, illustrations; 22 cm. Series: FIAT review of German science, 1939–1946. Notes: Text in German. Includes bibliographies. OCLC: 13374025.
- Rüger, Ludwig (1896– ), et al., 1948, Geology and palaeontology. [n.p.] Office of Military Govt. for Germany, Field Information Agencies Technical, British, French, U.S., 1948. 246 pages, folded map; 23 cm. Series: FIAT review of German science, 1939–1946. Notes: Text in German. Includes Bibliographies. OCLC: 13234581.
- Scheumann, Karl Hermann (1881– ), 1948, Petrography. [S.l.]: Office of Military Government for Germany, Field Information Agencies Technical, British, French, U.S., 1948. 2 volumes; 22 cm. Series: FIAT review of German science, 1939–1946. Notes: Text in German. Includes bibliographies. Part 1- Minerals. Part 2- Minerals and ores. OCLC: 01814899.
- Steinmetz, Hermann (1879– ), Berek, M., [et al.], 1948, Mineralogy. [S.l.]: Office of the Military Government for Germany, Field Information Agencies Technical, British, French, U.S., 1948. 304 pages, tables; 23 cm. Series: FIAT review of German science, 1939–1946. Notes: Text in German. "Mineralogische Lehrbücher": pages [291]-294. Bibliographical footnotes. OCLC: 4339330.
- Wissmann, Hermann von (1895– ), J. Blüthgen [and others], 1948, Geography. [n.p.] Office of Military Government for Germany, Field Information Agencies Technical, British French, U.S., 1948. 4 volumes in 1. Series: FIAT review of German science, 1939–1946. Notes: Text in German. Includes bibliographies. OCLC: 03375791.
- Field Information Agency, Technical (FIAT). 1945. "German Universities and Technical High schools." 21 August 1945. Issued by the UD Group Control Council (Germany), office of the Director of Intelligence, FIAT. Air Force Historical Research Agency (AFHRA), Maxwell Air Force Base, AL. IRIS #115705.

== Bibliography ==
- "German Scientific Work in 1939–1945." The Military Engineer. March–April 1949. Page 139. Descriptions of the FIAT Reviews of German science.
- Mumford, Russell W., McAllister, Malcolm H., Smith, Joseph P., Into, A. Norman and Gloss, Gunter H. Office of Military Government for Germany (US). "The Mining and Refining of Potash in the American and British Zones of Germany." FIAT Final Report #1045. Field Information Agency, Technical (FIAT), Technical Industrial Intelligence Division, US Department of Commerce. March 5, 1947.
- Walker, C. Lester, October 1946, "German War Secrets by the Thousands: Secrets By The Thousands." Harper's Magazine. Pages 329–336.
