= Bourley and Long Valley =

Protected area in Hampshire, England

Coordinates: 51.255°N 0.806°W

- Site of Special Scientific Interest
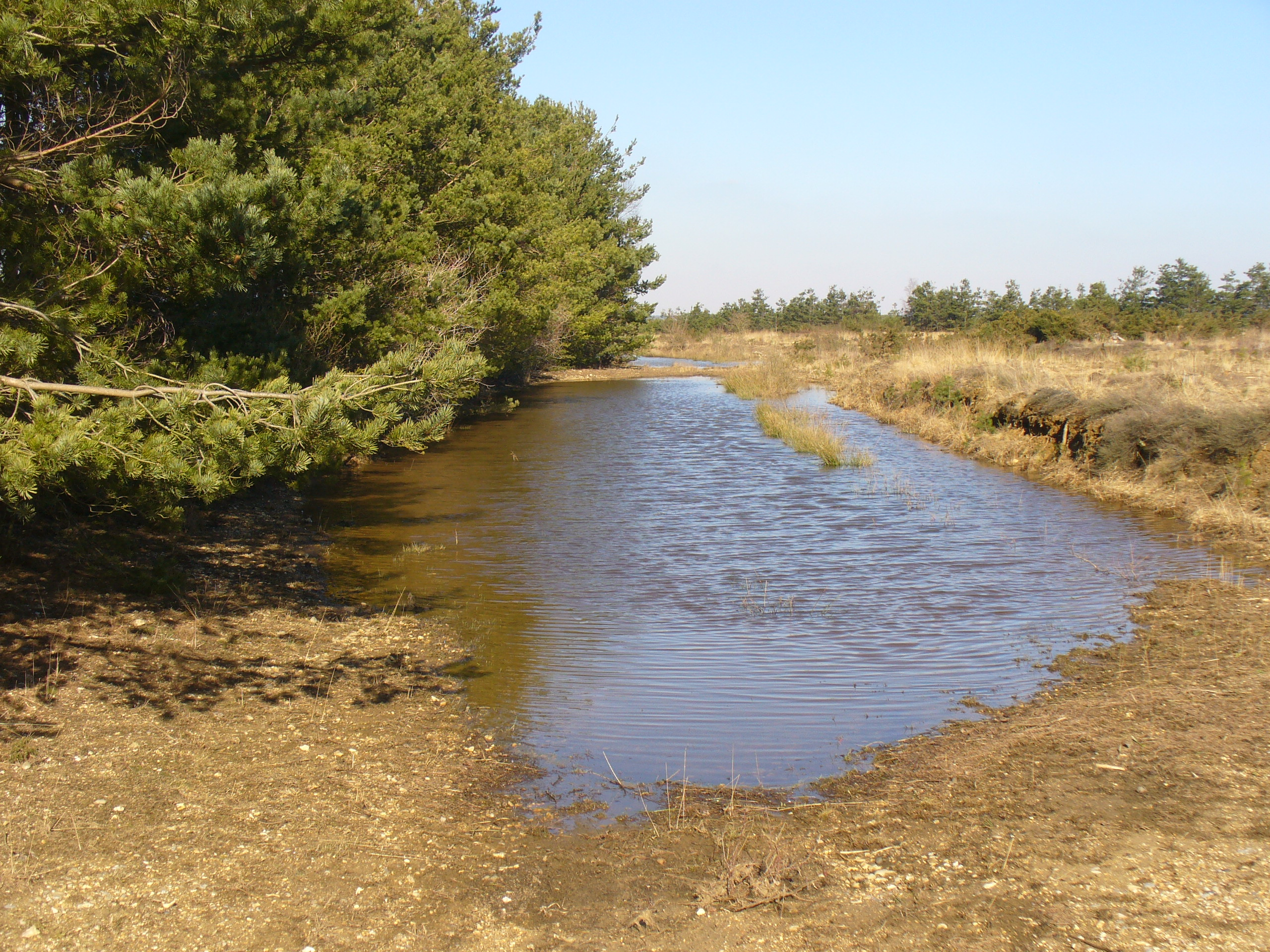
- Location of Bourley and Long Valley.
- Area of search: Hampshire
- Grid reference: SU 834 513
- Interest: Biological
- Area: 823.5 hectares (2,035 acres)
- Notification date: 1993
- Location map: Magic Map

Bourley and Long Valley is a 823.5-hectare (2,035-acre) biological Site of Special Scientific Interest between Fleet and Aldershot in Hampshire. It is part of Thames Basin Heaths Special Protection Area for the conservation of wild birds.

This site has varied habitats, with heath, woodland, scrub, mire and grassland. The heathland is important for three vulnerable birds, woodlarks, nightjars and Dartford warblers. There is a rich invertebrate fauna, including the nationally scarce Eumenes coarctatus potter wasp, silver-studded blue butterfly and downy emerald dragonfly.

Part of the area designated as Bourley and Long Valley SSSI is owned by the Ministry of Defence.
